= National Register of Historic Places listings in Colleton County, South Carolina =

Location of Colleton County in South Carolina

This is a list of the National Register of Historic Places listings in Colleton County, South Carolina.

This is intended to be a complete list of the properties and districts on the National Register of Historic Places in Colleton County, South Carolina, United States. The locations of National Register properties and districts for which the latitude and longitude coordinates are included below, may be seen in a map.

There are 12 properties and districts listed on the National Register in the county.

This National Park Service list is complete through NPS recent listings posted May 1, 2026.

== Current listings ==
| | Name on the Register | Image | Date listed | Location | City or town | Description |
|---|---|---|---|---|---|---|
| 1 | Colleton County Courthouse | Colleton County Courthouse | May 14, 1971 (#71000765) | Corner of Hampton and Jeffries Sts. 32°54′09″N 80°40′00″W | Walterboro | |
| 2 | Hickory Valley Historic District | Hickory Valley Historic District | November 21, 1980 (#80003666) | Roughly bounded by Ireland Creek, Jeffries Boulevard, and Wichman, Verdier, and Ivanhoe Sts. 32°54′26″N 80°39′42″W | Walterboro | |
| 3 | Hotel Albert Commercial Block | Hotel Albert Commercial Block | March 25, 1999 (#99000395) | 529, 539, and 545 E. Washington St. 32°54′18″N 80°39′47″W | Walterboro | |
| 4 | Old Colleton County Jail | Old Colleton County Jail | May 14, 1971 (#71000766) | Jeffries Boulevard; 32°54′25″N 80°39′20″W | Walterboro | |
| 5 | Pon Pon Chapel | Pon Pon Chapel | January 5, 1972 (#72001205) | Northwest of Jacksonboro on Parker's Ferry Rd. 32°48′30″N 80°29′33″W | Jacksonboro | |
| 6 | Ravenwood Plantation | Ravenwood Plantation | May 1, 1997 (#97000359) | South Carolina Highway 64, 0.9 miles east of South Carolina Highway 458; 32°49′42″N 80°34′41″W | Neyles | |
| 7 | Ruffin High and Elementary School | | January 3, 2025 (#100011263) | 155 Patriot Lane; 33°00′44″N 80°48′27″W | Ruffin | |
| 8 | St. James the Greater Catholic Mission | St. James the Greater Catholic Mission | September 29, 2015 (#15000676) | 3087 Ritter Rd. 32°46′36″N 80°39′44″W | Walterboro | |
| 9 | Spanish Mount Point | Spanish Mount Point | August 30, 1974 (#74001836) | Edisto Beach State Park; 32°29′57″N 80°19′13″W | Edisto Island | |
| 10 | Walterboro Historic District | Walterboro Historic District | November 10, 1980 (#80003667) | Roughly bounded by Jeffries Boulevard and Sanders, Black, Church, Valley, and Lemacks Sts.; also 807 Hampton St. 32°54′05″N 80°38′40″W | Walterboro | 807 Hampton represents a boundary increase of June 3, 1993 |
| 11 | Walterboro Library Society Building | Walterboro Library Society Building | October 14, 1971 (#71000767) | 801 Wichman St. 32°54′12″N 80°39′08″W | Walterboro | |
| 12 | Tom Williams House | | April 26, 1973 (#73001706) | 0.25 miles west of Williams on South Carolina Highway 362; 33°02′16″N 80°51′14″W | Williams | |

== See also ==
- List of National Historic Landmarks in South Carolina
- National Register of Historic Places listings in South Carolina
