= Super Bowl XXXIX =

2005 National Football League championship game

| New England Patriots (2) (AFC) (14–2) | Philadelphia Eagles (1) (NFC) (13–3) |
|---|---|
| 24 | 21 |
| Head coach: Bill Belichick | Head coach: Andy Reid |
| | 1 | 2 | 3 | 4 | Total |
|---|---|---|---|---|---|
| NE | 0 | 7 | 7 | 10 | 24 |
| PHI | 0 | 7 | 7 | 7 | 21 |
- Date: February 6, 2005
- Stadium: Alltel Stadium; Jacksonville, Florida
- MVP: Deion Branch, wide receiver
- Favorite: Patriots by 7
- Referee: Terry McAulay
- Attendance: 78,125

Ceremonies
- National anthem: The combined choirs of the U.S. Military Academy, the U.S. Naval Academy, the U.S. Air Force Academy, and the U.S. Coast Guard Academy, and U.S. Army Herald Trumpets
- Coin toss: Youth football players from Jacksonville: Tyler Callahan, Tyler Deal, Lawrence McCauley, and Jacob Santana; New Orleans NFL Junior Player Development coach Tomaris Jackson
- Halftime show: Paul McCartney

TV in the United States
- Network: Fox
- Announcers: Joe Buck, Troy Aikman, Cris Collinsworth, Pam Oliver and Chris Myers
- Nielsen ratings: 41.1 (est. 86 million viewers)
- Market share: 62
- Cost of 30-second commercial: $2.3 million

Radio in the United States
- Network: Westwood One
- Announcers: Marv Albert, Boomer Esiason, John Dockery and Bonnie Bernstein

Super Bowl XXXIX was an American football game played between the American Football Conference (AFC) champion New England Patriots and the National Football Conference (NFC) champion Philadelphia Eagles to decide the National Football League (NFL) champion for the 2004 season. The Patriots defeated the Eagles by the score of 24–21. The game was played on February 6, 2005, at Alltel Stadium (now EverBank Stadium) in Jacksonville, Florida, currently the only Super Bowl hosted in the city. The Patriots would not win another Super Bowl until a decade later in Super Bowl XLIX (2015).

The Patriots, who entered the Super Bowl after compiling a 14–2 regular season record, became the then-most recent team to win consecutive Super Bowls (until the Kansas City Chiefs did in 2023). The Patriots also became the second team after the Dallas Cowboys to win three Super Bowls in four seasons, cementing their status as the NFL dynasty of the 2000s. The Eagles were making their second-ever Super Bowl appearance after posting a 13–3 regular season record.

The game was close throughout, with the teams battling to a 14–14 tie by the end of the third quarter. The Patriots then scored 10 points in the 4th quarter with Corey Dillon's 2-yard touchdown run and Adam Vinatieri's 22-yard field goal. The Eagles then cut their deficit to 24–21, with quarterback Donovan McNabb's 30-yard touchdown pass to receiver Greg Lewis, with 1:48 remaining in the game but could not sustain the comeback. Overall, the Patriots forced four turnovers, while Patriots wide receiver Deion Branch was named Super Bowl MVP for recording 133 receiving yards and tied the Super Bowl record with 11 catches.

To avoid the possibility of an incident similar to the Super Bowl XXXVIII halftime show the previous year, the league selected Paul McCartney as a "safe" choice to perform during Super Bowl XXXIX's halftime. The broadcast of the game on Fox was watched by an estimated 86 million viewers.

Philadelphia and New England would face off again in Super Bowl LII thirteen years later, with the Eagles defeating the Patriots, 41–33.

== Background ==
=== Host selection process ===
NFL owners voted to award Super Bowl XXXIX to Jacksonville during their November 1, 2000, meeting held in Atlanta. It marked the first and to-date, only Super Bowl held in Jacksonville, and the third metropolitan area in the state of Florida to host a Super Bowl, after Miami and Tampa. Three cities submitted bids: Jacksonville (Alltel Stadium), Miami (Pro Player Stadium), and Oakland (Oakland Coliseum). Three Super Bowls host sites were selected during the meeting, XXXVIII, XXXIX, and XL. However, XXXIX was the only one of the three that involved a competitive voting process. The city of Jacksonville was awarded the 30th NFL franchise in November 1993. The expansion Jacksonville Jaguars began play in 1995, and would play their home games in Jacksonville Municipal Stadium. The facility was essentially a brand new stadium, built on the former site of the Gator Bowl. Almost all of the former Gator Bowl was demolished, except for the west upper deck, and ramping. Jacksonville had bid for the Super Bowl several times prior, specifically for XX, XXI, XXII, XXIII, XXIV, but they were rejected for various reasons including the aging condition of the Gator Bowl, and not having an NFL franchise at the time.

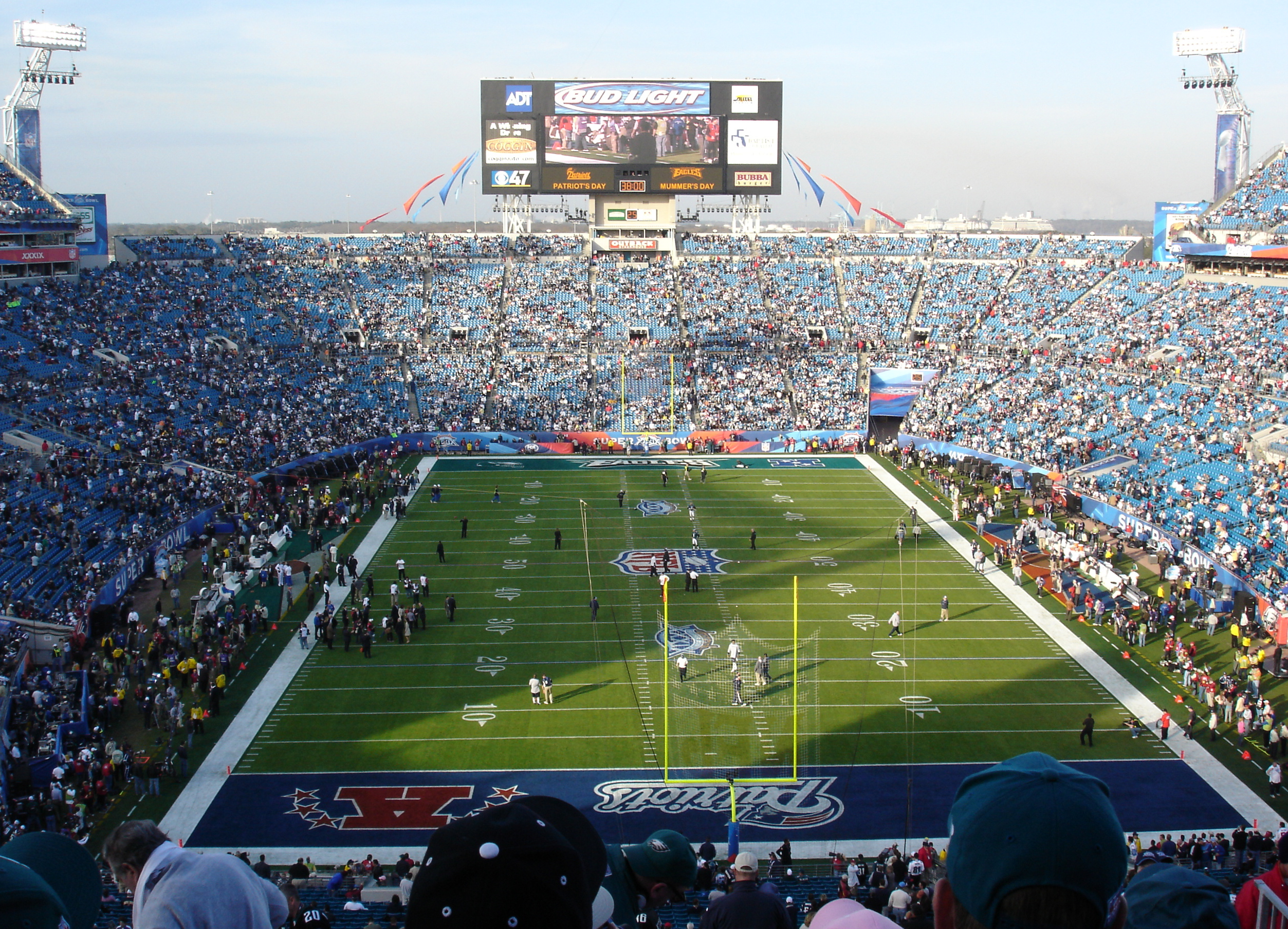
The field of Super Bowl XXXIX before kickoff

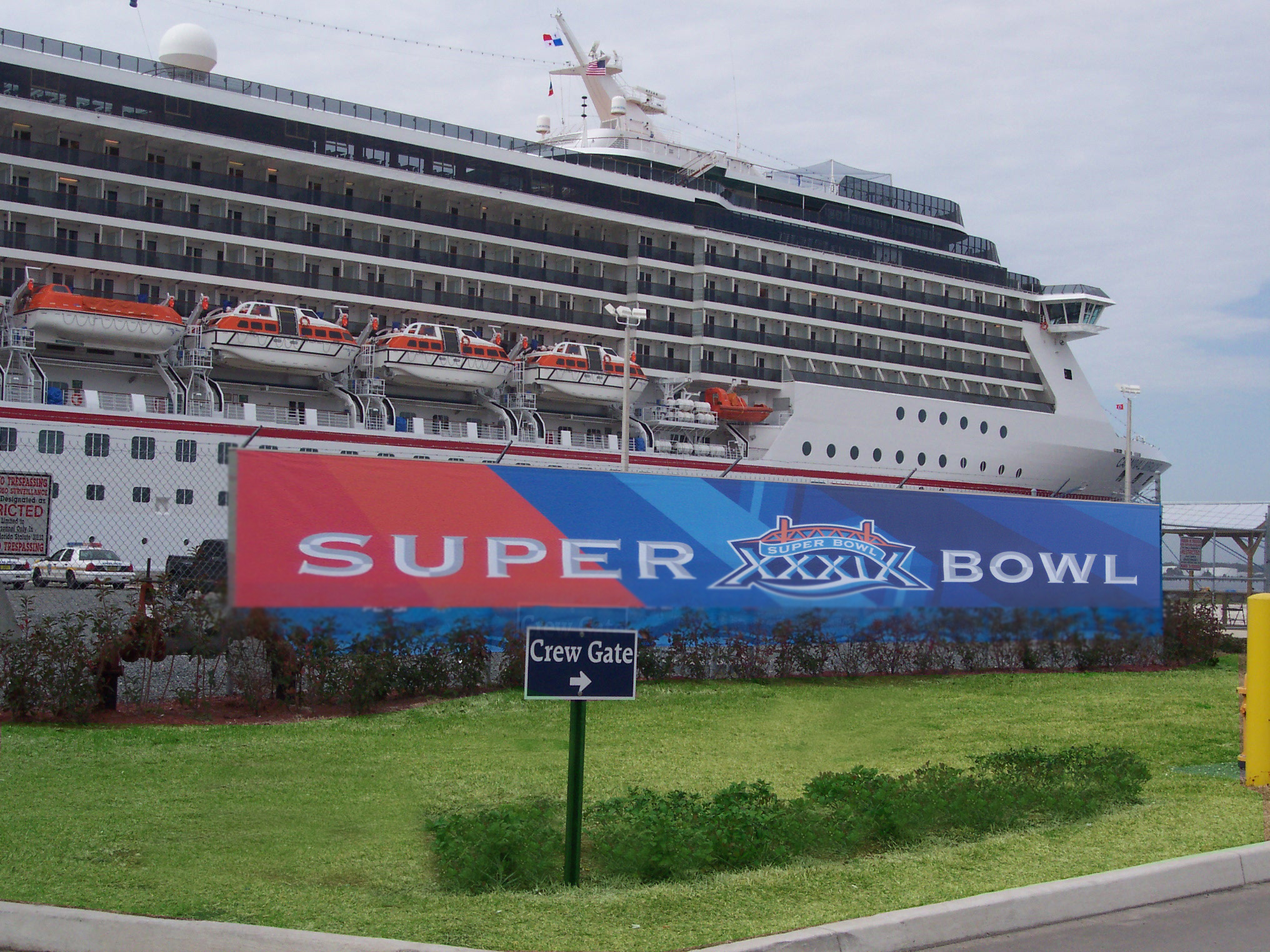
One of several cruise ships docked on the St. Johns River to supplement the capacity of Jacksonville's limited hotel room stock, a controversial solution

In May 1999, Jacksonville submitted their initial bid for XXXIX. Miami, Atlanta, and Oakland also submitted proposals. Atlanta, however, dropped out before the final bids were due on September 8. Rumors of bids by New Orleans and Kansas City never materialized. Oakland's bid in particular, was considered a long shot, and it did not even have the support of Raiders owner Al Davis. Miami was thought be the favorite to land the game, based on its experience having hosted the Super Bowl eight previous times. Jacksonville was an underdog, but garnered interest and attention as they represented a new market for the game. While the stadium had the capacity to host the game, area attractions were plentiful, and weather was acceptable, the greater Jacksonville area lacked the necessary number of premium-level hotel rooms needed to satisfy the NFL's requirements. The host committee's solution, though controversial, was to dock several cruise ships on the St. Johns River near downtown to serve as temporary hotels. The plan was expensive, and would require roughly 800 buses to shuttle attendees back-and-forth to the various events and activities throughout the week.

A city would win the vote if they received 3/4 of the ballots during any of the first three rounds. If no city won during the first three rounds, the fourth round would revert to a simple majority. Only 31 of the 32 team owners took part; expansion Houston did not vote. Oakland was eliminated on the second ballot. Jacksonville won on the fourth ballot. Houston was awarded XXXVIII, and Detroit was awarded XL. Officials from the Miami contingent, which included Don Shula and Dan Marino, expressed displeasure over the results. Dolphins president Eddie Jones said "[Jacksonville] will do a good job, but it's not the best place." Miami would ultimately land the next available game (XLI).

=== New England Patriots ===
The Patriots finished the regular season with a record of 14–2, bested only by the Pittsburgh Steelers' 15–1 mark, and ranking seventh in yards gained (5,773) and fourth in points scored (437).

The Patriots' major acquisition prior to the season was veteran running back Corey Dillon, who joined the team after playing seven seasons with the Cincinnati Bengals. Dillon was acquired in exchange for a second-round draft pick. Dillon became a significant offensive weapon for the 2004 Patriots, recording a franchise record 1,635 rushing yards and 12 touchdowns, and was named to the Pro Bowl for the fourth time in his career.

Another weapon in the Patriots' offensive backfield was running back Kevin Faulk, who rushed for 255 yards, had 248 receiving yards, and scored three total touchdowns. Fullback Patrick Pass also emerged as a big contributor, rushing for 141 yards and catching 28 passes for 215 yards.

Pro Bowl quarterback Tom Brady remained at the helm of the Patriots offense, with 3,692 passing yards, 28 touchdowns, and 14 interceptions. Although wide receiver Deion Branch, the Patriots' major deep threat, missed most of the season because of injuries, he recorded 454 yards and four touchdowns. Wide receiver David Givens was the team's leading receiver with 874 receiving yards and three touchdowns. Wide receiver David Patten also contributed 800 receiving yards and seven touchdowns, and tight end Daniel Graham had 364 receiving yards and seven touchdowns. On special teams, pro bowl kicker Adam Vinatieri had the best season of his career, leading the NFL in field goals made (31), field goal percentage (93.9) and scoring (141 points)

On defense, the Patriots were plagued by injuries, especially in their secondary. Cornerbacks Tyrone Poole and Ty Law suffered season ending injuries, while safety Eugene Wilson, who led the team with four interceptions, missed several games. With their patchwork secondary, the Patriots ranked 17th in passing yards allowed (3,400), However, they did rank seventh in interceptions (20) and 10th in fewest passing touchdowns allowed (18). Most importantly, the Patriots continued to win despite the injuries. Converted wide receiver Troy Brown turned out to be very effective playing as a defensive back, ranking second on the team with three interceptions. Safety Rodney Harrison was also an impact player, leading the team with 138 tackles while also recording three sacks and two interceptions.

Up front, the Patriots' defensive line was anchored by Pro Bowler Richard Seymour, who recorded five sacks. The Patriots also still had their trio of impact veteran linebackers: Pro Bowler Tedy Bruschi (122 tackles, three and a half sacks, three interceptions), Willie McGinest (nine and a half sacks, one interception), and Mike Vrabel (71 tackles and five and a half sacks), along with Ted Johnson. Vrabel also frequently played at the tight end position during offensive plays near the opponent's goal line, recording two touchdown receptions.

=== Philadelphia Eagles ===
The Eagles earned the NFC Super Bowl berth after three consecutive defeats in the NFC Championship Game. The Eagles hired Andy Reid as their head coach in 1999 following two straight losing seasons. That same year, they used their first-round pick in the NFL draft (the second overall) to select quarterback Donovan McNabb. Prior to the 2004 season, the Eagles traded for wide receiver Terrell Owens to be the impact player to help get them to the Super Bowl.

Owens joined the team after eight seasons with the San Francisco 49ers. Owens became the Eagles' deep-ball threat, finishing the season with 1,200 receiving yards and 14 touchdowns. McNabb had the best season of his career in 2004, passing for 3,875 yards, 31 touchdowns, and eight interceptions, making him the first quarterback to ever throw for more than 30 touchdowns and fewer than 10 interceptions in a season. He also rushed for 220 yards and 3 touchdowns. Wide receiver Todd Pinkston was also a reliable target, recording 36 catches for 676 yards.

The Eagles' running game was not as strong as their passing attack, ranking 24th in the league in rushing yards (1,639). Running back Brian Westbrook led the team with 812 rushing yards and three touchdowns, however he also led all NFL running backs in receiving with 706 receiving yards and six touchdowns. Veteran running back Dorsey Levens added 410 rushing yards. The Eagles' offensive line was led by Pro Bowl tackles Tra Thomas and Jon Runyan and center Hank Fraley.

Three of their four starters in the defensive secondary were named to the Pro Bowl: Cornerback Lito Sheppard (one sack, five interceptions, and two touchdowns), safety Michael Lewis (88 tackles, one sack, and one interception) and safety Brian Dawkins (three sacks and 4 interceptions), while their fourth starter, cornerback Sheldon Brown, also enjoyed a solid year (89 tackles, three sacks, two interceptions). Their defensive line was anchored by Pro Bowl defensive tackle Corey Simon (five and a half sacks) and defensive ends Jevon Kearse (seven and a half sacks) and Derrick Burgess. Pro Bowl middle linebacker Jeremiah Trotter, who only started nine games, recorded 69 tackles and a sack.

The Eagles started the 2004 regular season with seven straight wins before suffering a loss to the 15-1 Steelers. After that, they finished the season with a 13–3 record. Their only other two losses were in their final two games of the season, when they decided to rest all of their starters because they had already clinched the NFC #1 seed. However, during a December 19 win over the Dallas Cowboys, Owens was seriously injured on a "horse-collar tackle" by Cowboys defensive back Roy Williams and missed the rest of the regular season and the playoffs.

=== Playoffs ===
Despite the loss of Owens, the Eagles beat the Minnesota Vikings, 27–14, and the Atlanta Falcons, 27–10, in the playoffs with relative ease. McNabb recorded 21 out of 33 completions for 286 yards and two touchdowns, while receiver Freddie Mitchell scored two touchdowns in the victory over the Vikings. Although Vikings quarterback Daunte Culpepper threw for 316 yards, the Eagles defense recorded two interceptions and two sacks. McNabb then completed 17 out of 26 passes for 180 yards and two touchdowns in the win over the Falcons.The Eagles defense held dual-threat quarterback Michael Vick to only 136 passing yards, 26 rushing yards, and no touchdowns, while also recording an interception and four sacks. McNabb had an average passer rating of 111.3 in the two games, with 466 passing yards, 35 rushing yards, four touchdowns, and no turnovers. Safety Brian Dawkins was also an important player, recording a sack and a forced fumble against the Vikings, followed by an interception and a forced fumble against the Falcons in the NFC Championship Game.

Meanwhile, the Patriots defeated the Indianapolis Colts, 20–3, holding the league's highest scoring team with 522 total points to just one field goal. Colts quarterback Peyton Manning was limited to 238 passing yards with an interception and no touchdowns. The Patriots also held possession of the ball for 37:43, including 21:26 in the second half, and recorded three long scoring drives that each took over seven minutes off the clock. One reason the Patriots were able to hold the ball so long was because of Dillon's rushing. He finished the game with 23 carries for 144 yards and 5 receptions for 17 yards.

The Patriots then defeated the first seeded Pittsburgh Steelers in the AFC Championship Game, 41–27. Although the Steelers finished the season with the best record in the NFL at 15–1 and had beaten the Patriots during the regular season and led the league in fewest total yards allowed, they could not stop the Patriots. Brady threw for 207 yards and two touchdowns; Dillon rushed for 73 yards and a touchdown; and Branch, who was coming off of his injuries, recorded 4 receptions for 116 yards and a touchdown, along with 37 rushing yards and another touchdown on 2 carries. Steelers quarterback Ben Roethlisberger was intercepted three times, including an 87-yard interception returned for a touchdown by Rodney Harrison, and running back Jerome Bettis, the Steelers' leading rusher, was held to just 64 yards.

=== Super Bowl pregame news ===
Owens was cleared to play in Super Bowl XXXIX, defying doctors' orders by playing on his injured ankle containing two screws and a metal plate.

The other major story was the Patriots' potential loss of both their offensive coordinator and defensive coordinator at the end of the season, and how it might affect the team in 2005. On December 12, 2004, about a month and a half before the game, Patriots offensive coordinator Charlie Weis signed a contract to become the head coach of Notre Dame starting in the 2005 season. Rumors were also circulating that defensive coordinator Romeo Crennel would also leave the team to become the head coach of the Cleveland Browns (which ended up being true as Crennel and the Browns agreed to a contract a couple of weeks after the Super Bowl).

Due to injuries at the tight end spot, the Eagles were forced to sign Jeff Thomason, a former tight end who was working construction at the time, to a one-game contract for the Super Bowl. Thomason saw time during several plays, although never had a ball thrown his way. This was his third Super Bowl, playing in two with the Green Bay Packers during Andy Reid's days as a Packers assistant.

With this appearance the Patriots became the eighth team to play in five Super Bowls They joined the Dallas Cowboys, Denver Broncos, Pittsburgh Steelers, San Francisco 49ers, Miami Dolphins, Washington Redskins, and Oakland/Los Angeles Raiders. They would later be joined by the Green Bay Packers in 2011 the New York Giants in 2012, the Los Angeles Rams in 2022, the Kansas City Chiefs in 2023, and the Philadelphia Eagles in 2025.

The Eagles were trying to win their first NFL title since 1960 and the first championship for the city of Philadelphia since Moses Malone's "fo', fi', fo'" during the 76ers run to the 1983 NBA Championship. With President George W. Bush being inaugurated for a second time in January, the Eagles were also trying to end a losing streak—teams in the city of Philadelphia had lost six straight championships during presidential inauguration years, beginning with the 76ers loss in 1977. The streak included the Eagles in Super Bowl XV in 1981. 1989 was not included in that streak, but 1977, 1981, 1985 (Flyers), 1993 (Phillies), 1997 (Flyers), and 2001 (76ers) were.

As the designated home team in the annual rotation between AFC and NFC teams, the Eagles elected to wear their home midnight green uniforms with white pants, while the Patriots wore their away white uniforms with navy pants.

== Broadcasting ==
The game was televised in the United States by Fox, with play-by-play announcer Joe Buck and color commentators Troy Aikman and Cris Collinsworth. At age 35, Buck was the youngest announcer to call the play-by-play of a Super Bowl telecast. This also marked the first time since Super Bowl I that none of the television commentators had ever called a Super Bowl game before (although Collinsworth had worked three prior Super Bowl telecasts as a pregame analyst for NBC and then Fox). This was the last game that Collinsworth broadcast as a member of Fox, as he chose to return to NBC as a Football Night in America analyst in the following off-season.

Pam Oliver (Patriots sideline) and Chris Myers (Eagles sideline) served as sideline reporters. James Brown hosted all the events with help from his fellow Fox NFL Sunday cast members Terry Bradshaw, Howie Long, and Jimmy Johnson. Jillian Barberie served as weather and entertainment reporter. This was the final Super Bowl that Brown hosted for Fox, as he would return to CBS following the 2005 season.

For its Super Bowl lead-out program, Fox aired a special episode of The Simpsons ("Homer and Ned's Hail Mary Pass") and the series premiere of American Dad! ("Pilot"). Local stations WTXF in Philadelphia and WFXT in Boston instead immediately aired their own local postgame shows/newscasts, delayed Fox's programming in those markets by an hour.

Westwood One broadcast the game on radio, with Marv Albert calling the play-by-play, Boomer Esiason providing color commentary, and John Dockery and Bonnie Bernstein reporting from the sidelines. Jim Gray hosted the broadcast along with Dave Sims.

== Entertainment ==
=== Pregame ceremonies ===
Before the game, performances came from the Black Eyed Peas, Earth Wind & Fire, Charlie Daniels, John Fogerty, Kelly Clarkson, and Gretchen Wilson.

Shortly before kickoff, Will Smith introduced Alicia Keys who sang "America the Beautiful," paying tribute to Ray Charles, who died in June 2004.

As part of a 60th anniversary tribute to World War Two veterans, former U.S. presidents Bill Clinton and George H. W. Bush appeared with the veterans, among whom were contingents of WAVES and Tuskegee Airmen and a Medal of Honor recipient. The combined choirs of the U.S. Military Academy, the U.S. Naval Academy, the U.S. Air Force Academy, and the U.S. Coast Guard Academy (including members of The Idlers) sang the national anthem accompanied by the U.S. Army Herald Trumpets. This was the first time in more than 30 years that all four service academies sang together—the last time was at the second inauguration of President Richard Nixon in 1973 and the only time since 1985 that the national anthem was not sung by a notable recording artist. Michael Douglas hosted this event.

The traditional military missing man formation flyby was this year performed by a pair of F/A-18 Super Hornets from VFA-106 at NAS Oceana and a pair of the Air Force's newest fighters, the F-22 Raptor, flying from Tyndall AFB, the training base for the Raptor. The earlier military flyby during the veterans' salute was conducted by two T-6 Texan trainers and a B-25 Mitchell bomber.

The coin toss ceremony featured youth football players from Jacksonville: Tyler Callahan, Tyler Deal, Lawrence McCauley, and Jacob Santana; and New Orleans NFL Junior Player Development coach Tamaris Jackson.

For the third straight year, each team took the field en masse, following a tradition the Patriots had started in Super Bowl XXXVI. In prerecorded video segments, Andover, Massachusetts native Michael Chiklis introduced the Patriots, and Philadelphia-born Will Smith introduced the Eagles.

=== Halftime show ===
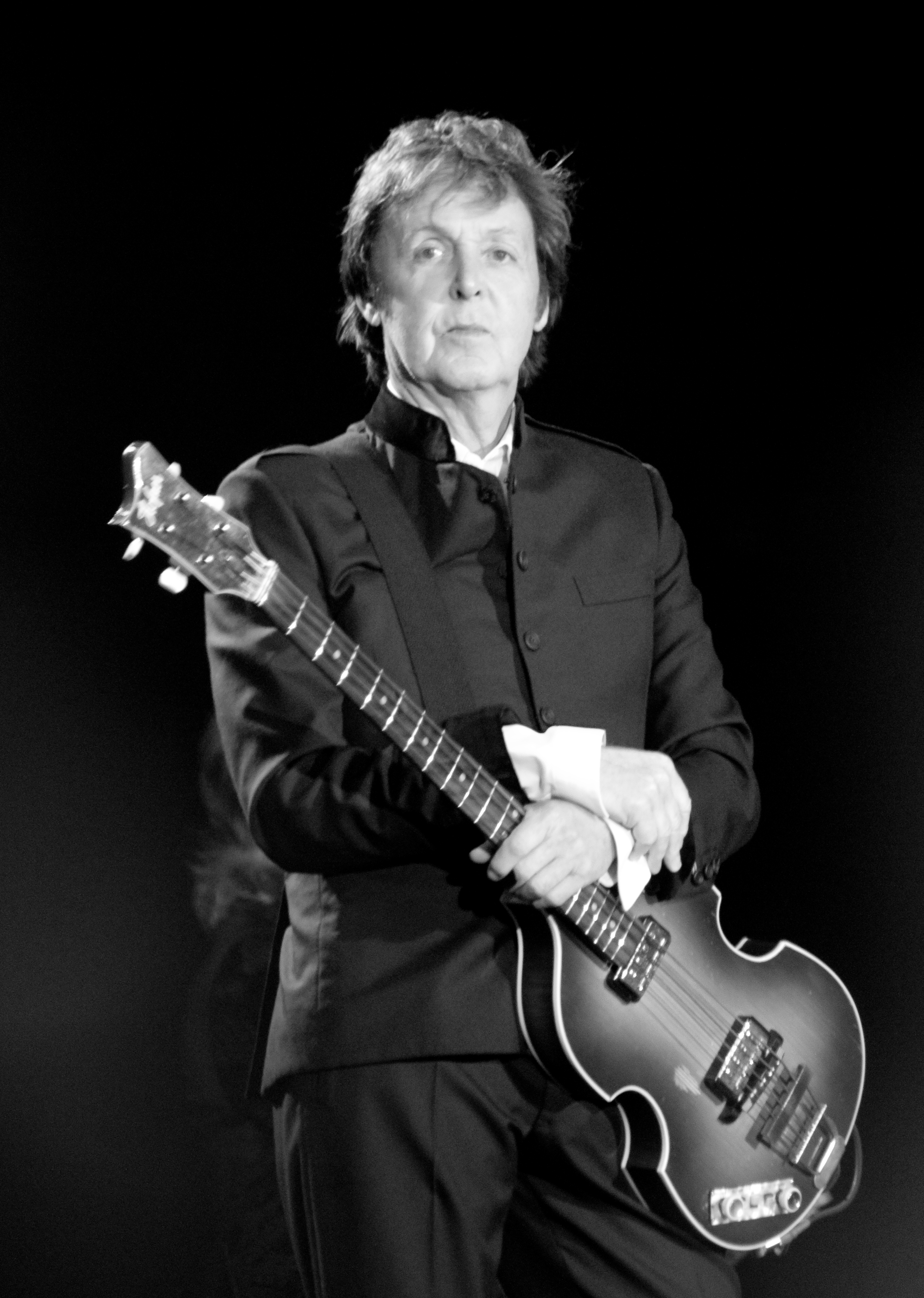
Paul McCartney performed during the halftime show

Paul McCartney performed during the halftime show; his selection by the NFL, the show's producers, Don Mischer Productions, and the show's sponsor, Ameriquest Mortgage, was considered to be a "safe" choice, as it avoided the possibility for an incident similar to that which sparked the Super Bowl XXXVIII halftime show controversy the previous year. McCartney's set consisted of these songs:

- "Drive My Car" from his career with the Beatles.
- "Get Back" from his career with the Beatles.
- "Live and Let Die" from his career with Wings.
- "Hey Jude" from his career with the Beatles.

=== Theme ===
Taking the concept a step further, for the first time, a theme was tied to the event: Building Bridges, as symbolized by the theme logo, represented by the Main Street Bridge, one of the seven bridges that crosses over the St. Johns River in the host city, and according to the League, symbolized the bridging of a nation under the NFL football umbrella. The theme was also used by Jacksonville-area nonprofit Fresh Ministries in a major event entitled "Bridges of Peace," featuring city officials asking the people to unite for the Super Bowl and heal the wounds of segregation.

=== Presidential appearances ===
Former Presidents George H. W. Bush and Bill Clinton appeared in support of their bipartisan effort to raise money for relief of the December 26, 2004, tsunami in southeast Asia through the USA Freedom Corps, an action which former President Bush described as "transcending politics."

== Game summary ==
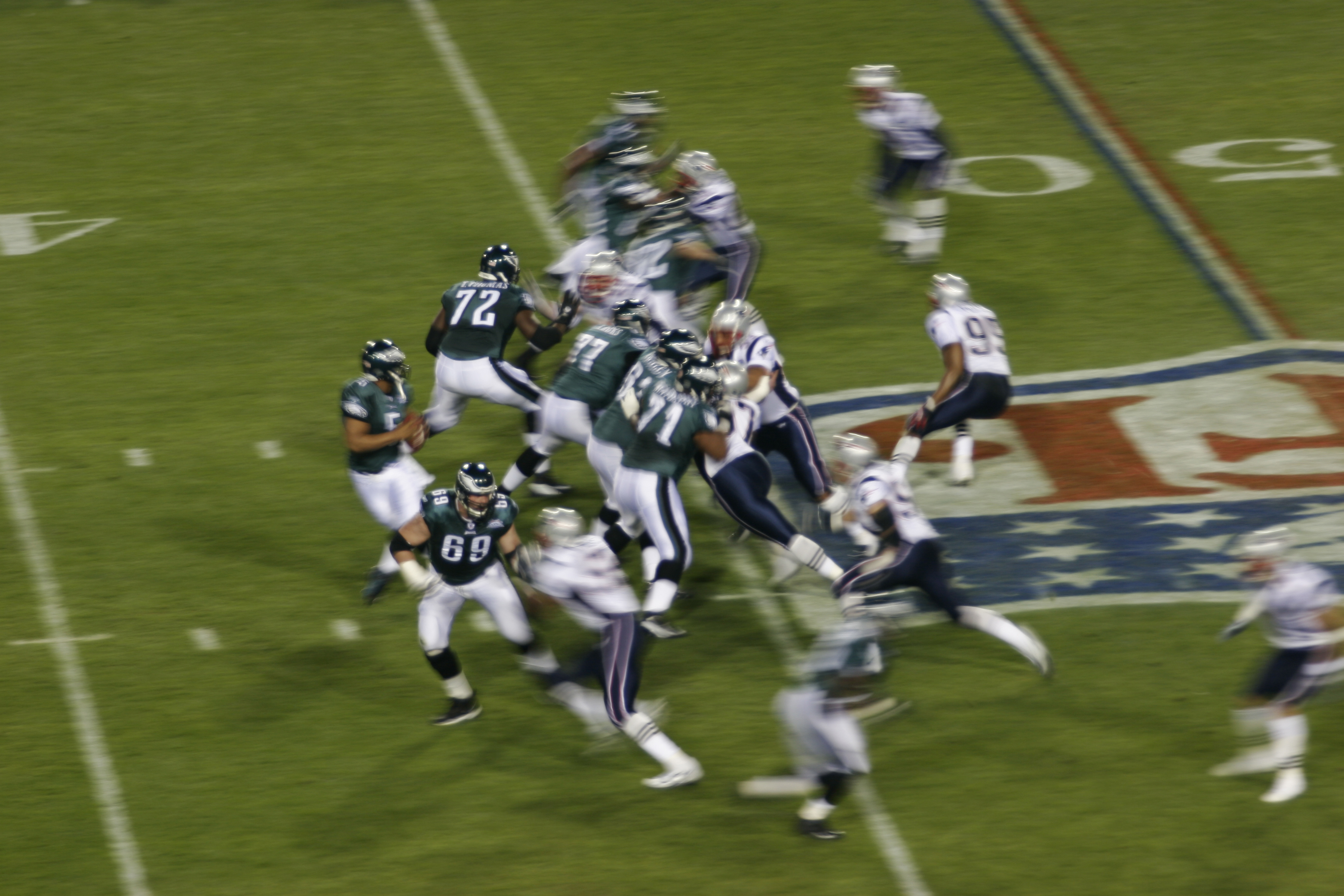
The Eagles on offense

=== First quarter ===
On the first drive of the game, Eagles quarterback Donovan McNabb appeared to narrowly avoid a sack by Patriots linebacker Tedy Bruschi, but fumble the ball while running into linebacker Willie McGinest, with the Patriots recovering it at the Eagles' 34-yard line. Eagles head coach Andy Reid's instant replay challenge overruled the fumble; officials ruled that McNabb's knee hit the ground while he was being hit by Bruschi before he lost the ball. Later in the quarter after each team had punted twice, McNabb completed a 30-yard pass to wide receiver Terrell Owens, with an unnecessary roughness penalty against linebacker Rosevelt Colvin adding 9 yards, moving the ball inside the Patriots' 10-yard line. However, linebacker Mike Vrabel sacked McNabb for a 16-yard loss on the next play. On the following play, the Eagles once again appeared to turn the ball over; McNabb's pass was intercepted in the end zone by cornerback Asante Samuel, who returned it to his own 30-yard line, but the play was nullified by an illegal contact penalty against linebacker Roman Phifer, moving the ball back inside the 20 and giving the Eagles a first down. However, the Eagles turned the ball over for real on the next play when McNabb threw an interception to safety Rodney Harrison. This was McNabb's first red zone interception of the season.

The Eagles' defense then forced the Patriots to a three-and-out on their ensuing possession, and the Eagles got great field position by receiving Josh Miller's punt at the Patriots' 45-yard line. But three plays later, Harrison held up tight end L. J. Smith, enabling cornerback Randall Gay to punch the ball loose, with safety Eugene Wilson making the recovery at the 38.

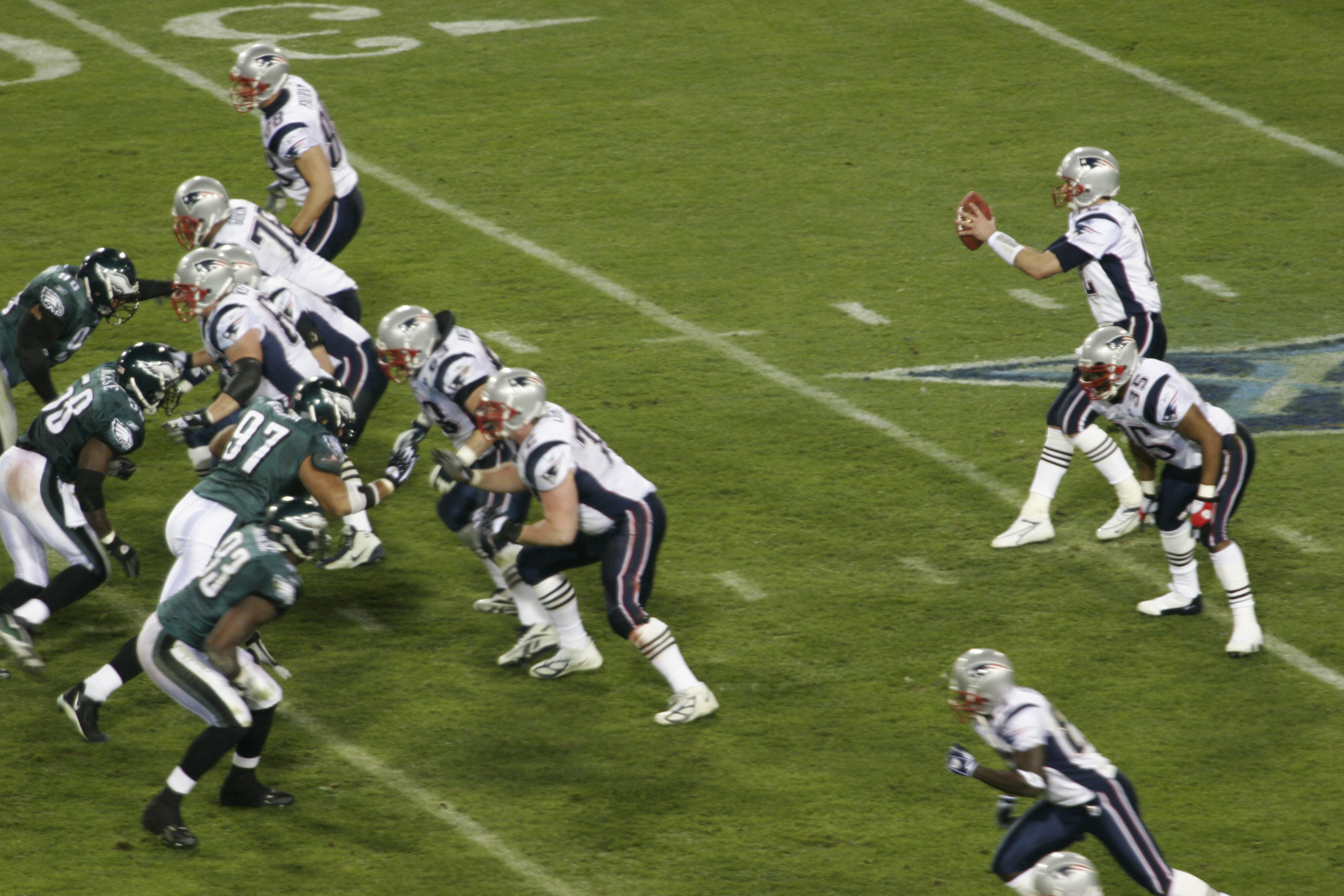
Brady takes the snap

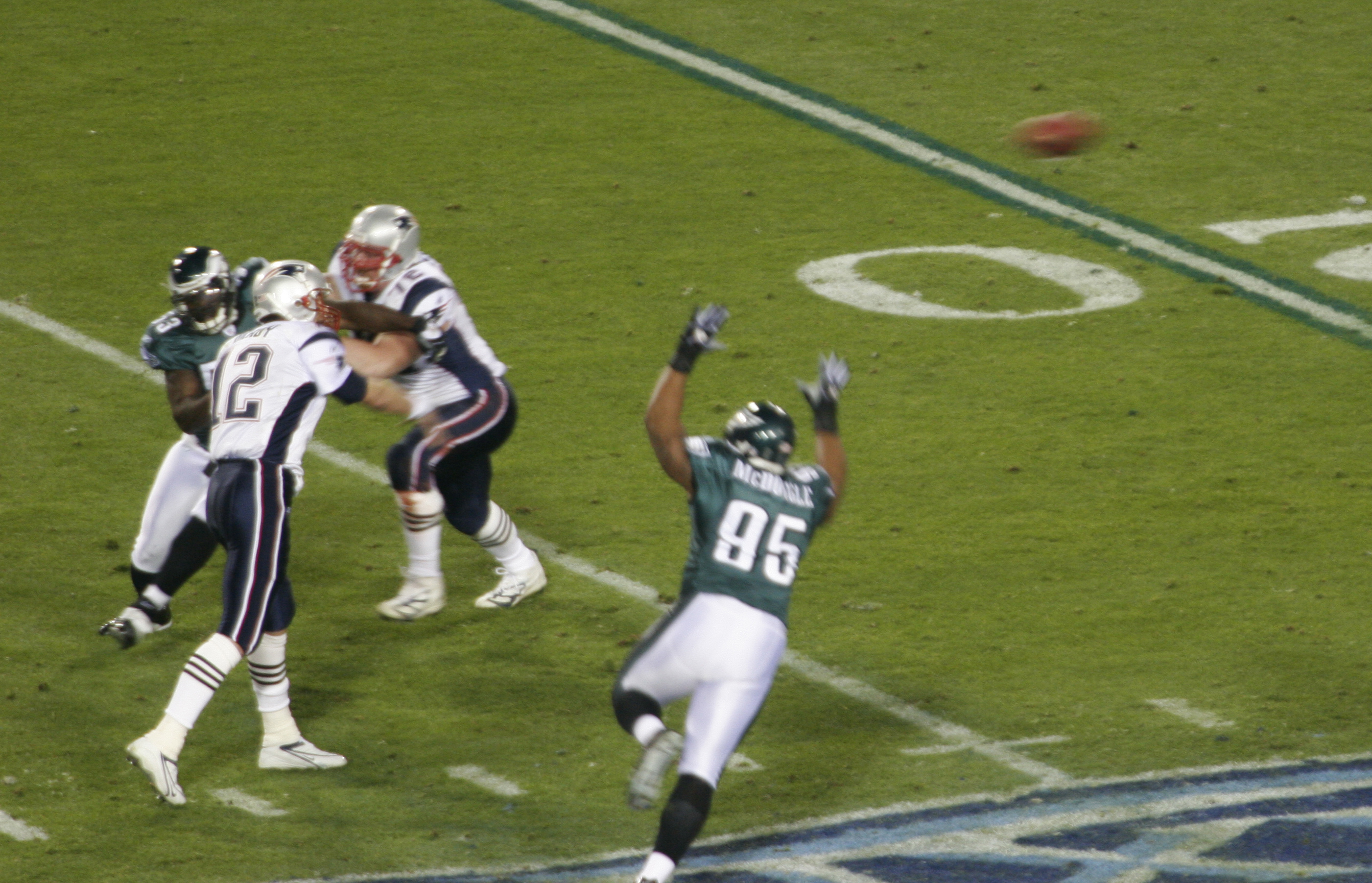
Brady throws a pass

=== Second quarter ===
The Eagles' defense once again forced the Patriots to punt and got the ball back at their own 19-yard line. Aided by a pair of completions from McNabb to wide receiver Todd Pinkston for 57 yards, the Eagles drove 81 yards in nine plays and scored on McNabb's 6-yard touchdown pass to Smith, taking a 7–0 lead with 9:55 left in the half. It was the first time the Patriots trailed during the entire postseason. On their ensuing drive, the Patriots moved the ball to the Eagles' 4-yard line, mainly on plays by running back Corey Dillon, who caught two screen passes for 29 yards and rushed for 25. But quarterback Tom Brady fumbled the ball on a fake hand-off play-action pass and Eagles defensive tackle Darwin Walker recovered it. However, the Eagles could not take advantage of the turnover and had to punt after three plays. Dirk Johnson's punt went just 29 yards, giving the Patriots the ball at the Eagles' 37-yard line. The Patriots then drove 37 yards in seven plays to score on Brady's 4-yard pass to wide receiver David Givens with 1:10 remaining in the period, tying the game 7–7 by halftime. It was only the second halftime tie in Super Bowl history (Super Bowl XXIII between the San Francisco 49ers and the Cincinnati Bengals was the other; the score at the half was 3–3) and the first time both of the game's first two quarters ended tied.

=== Third quarter ===
On the opening drive of the second half, Patriots wide receiver Deion Branch caught four passes from Brady for 71 yards on a drive that ended with Brady's 2-yard touchdown pass to Vrabel, who lined up at the tight end spot, mirroring Brady's touchdown pass to Vrabel in the previous Super Bowl. The score gave the Patriots their first lead of the game, 14–7. After the teams traded punts, the Eagles tied the game with 3:39 left in the third period with a 74-yard, 10-play drive that was capped by McNabb's 10-yard touchdown pass to running back Brian Westbrook. For the first time in Super Bowl history, the game was tied going into the fourth quarter.

=== Fourth quarter ===
The Patriots immediately broke the tie again with a nine-play, 66-yard scoring drive that was keyed by three plays from running back Kevin Faulk, who caught two passes for 27 combined yards and rushed once for 12. Dillon capped off the drive with a 2-yard touchdown run to give the Patriots a 21–14 lead. Then after forcing another Eagles punt, Branch made a spectacular 19-yard catch, taking the ball out of the hands of cornerback Sheldon Brown. A roughing-the-passer penalty on defensive tackle Corey Simon on the same play set up kicker Adam Vinatieri's 22-yard field goal with 8:43 left in the game to increase the Patriots' lead to 24–14. In all three Patriots' Super Bowl wins in the decade, they held a double digit lead in the fourth quarter, but all of their victories were decided by a field goal.

The Eagles responded with a 36-yard completion from McNabb to Owens to reach the Patriots' 36-yard line, but on the next play, McNabb fired a pass over the head of running back Dorsey Levens, where Bruschi was waiting to intercept it at his 24-yard line. At this point, there was only 7:20 to play in the game, with the Patriots still up by 10 points.

The Eagles did force the Patriots to punt, and got the ball back at their own 21-yard line, but with 5:40 left in the game. The Eagles then drove 79 yards in 13 plays, scoring on McNabb's 30-yard touchdown pass to wide receiver Greg Lewis (the first touchdown catch of his career) and cutting their deficit to 24–21. However, the drive consumed 3:52 of the clock, and only 1:48 remained in the game by the time Lewis scored. Because of this, many sportswriters later criticized the Eagles for not immediately going to a no-huddle offense at the start of the possession. Anecdotal reports later came out alleging that McNabb was suffering from dry-heaves, and teammates Jon Ritchie and Lito Sheppard have gone on record years later that McNabb was suffering from dry-heaves or vomiting, though no video evidence exists and the stories have not been confirmed. Center Hank Fraley said in an interview the day after the game that McNabb was "almost puking" due to two large hits from Bruschi and defensive end Jarvis Green on back-to-back plays. McNabb himself denies that he was vomiting or dry-heaving during the final drive, and Brian Westbrook later claimed that McNabb was merely "coughing."

The Eagles failed to recover their ensuing onside kick attempt, with Patriots tight end Christian Fauria catching the ball cleanly and sliding down to seal possession for the Patriots. The Patriots then played it safe by running the ball three times and forcing the Eagles to use up their remaining timeouts. Miller then pinned the Eagles back at their own 4-yard line with just 46 seconds left in the game. The Eagles then tried one last desperate drive to win or tie the game. But on first down from his own end zone, McNabb was pressured into making a rushed pass to Westbrook at the line of scrimmage. Instead of dropping the pass to stop the clock, Westbrook made the mistake of catching the ball and was immediately tackled for no gain by Phifer, keeping the clock running and forcing the Eagles to run back to the line of scrimmage for their next play with no huddle. On second down, McNabb threw an incomplete pass intended for Owens. Finally on third down, McNabb threw a pass that deflected off of the outstretched fingertips of Smith and into the arms of Harrison for an interception with nine seconds left. Brady took a knee to run out the clock, clinching the third Super Bowl title in four years for the Patriots, and in the eyes of many establishing themselves as a dynasty.

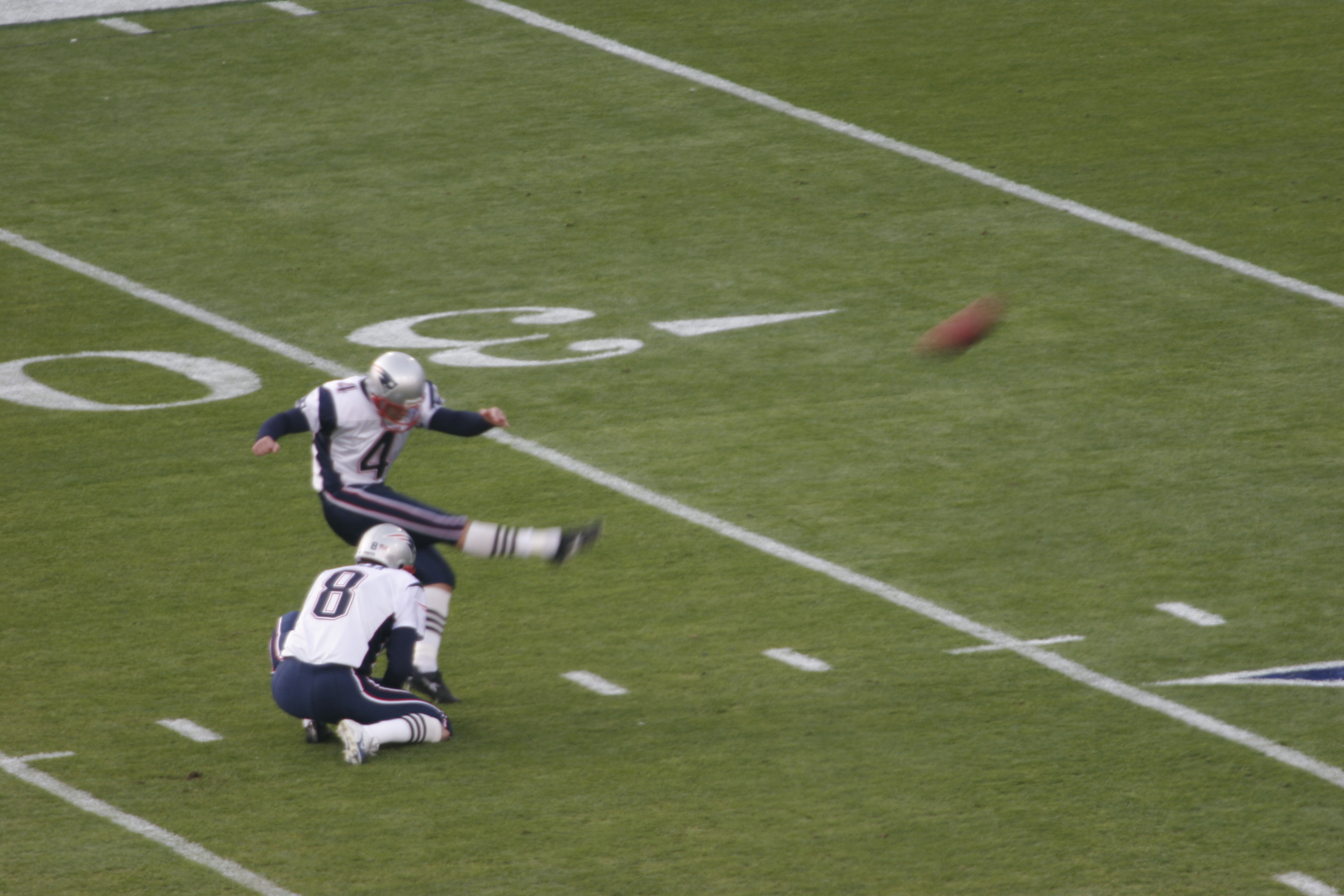
Adam Vinatieri warms up before the game

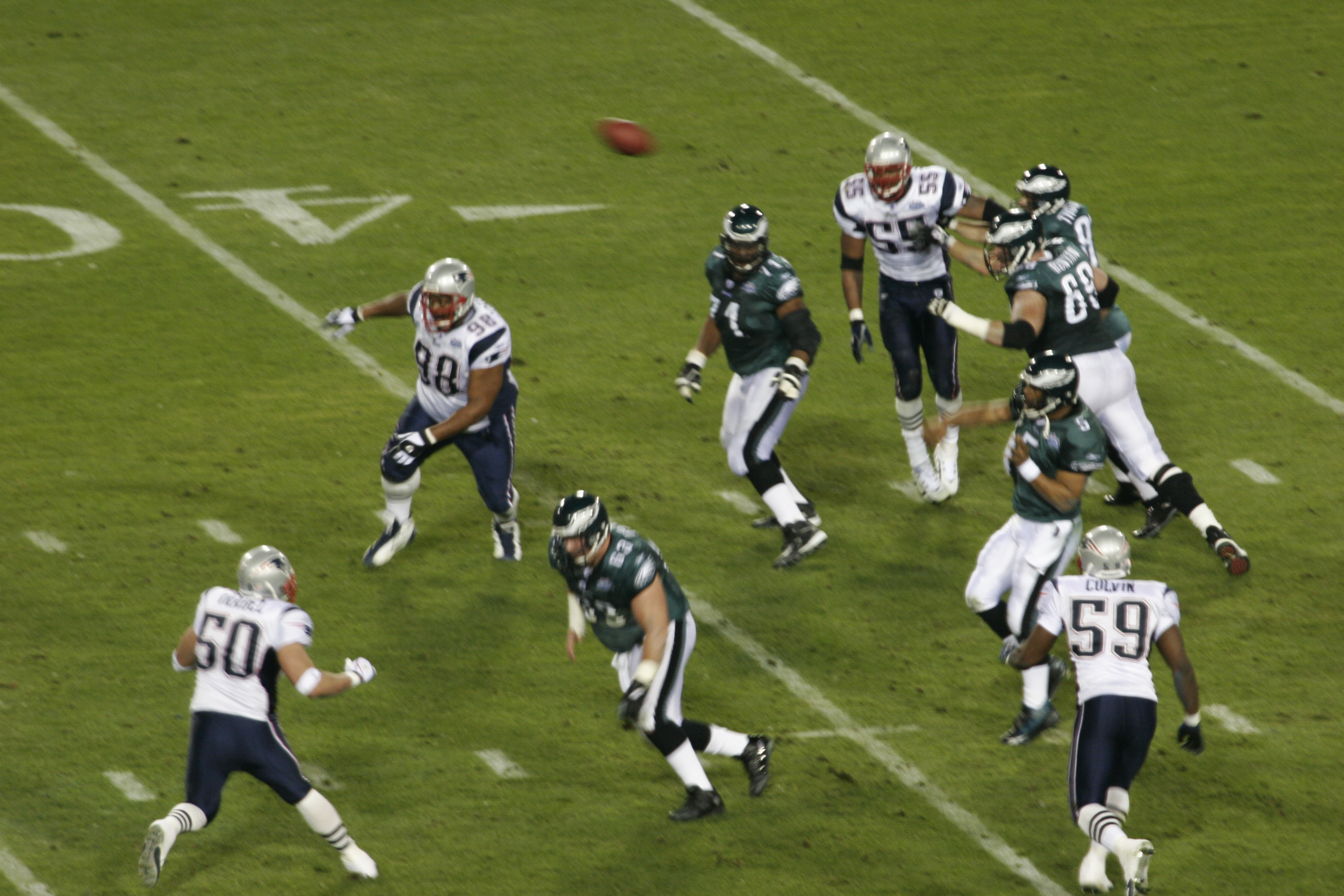
An Eagles offensive play

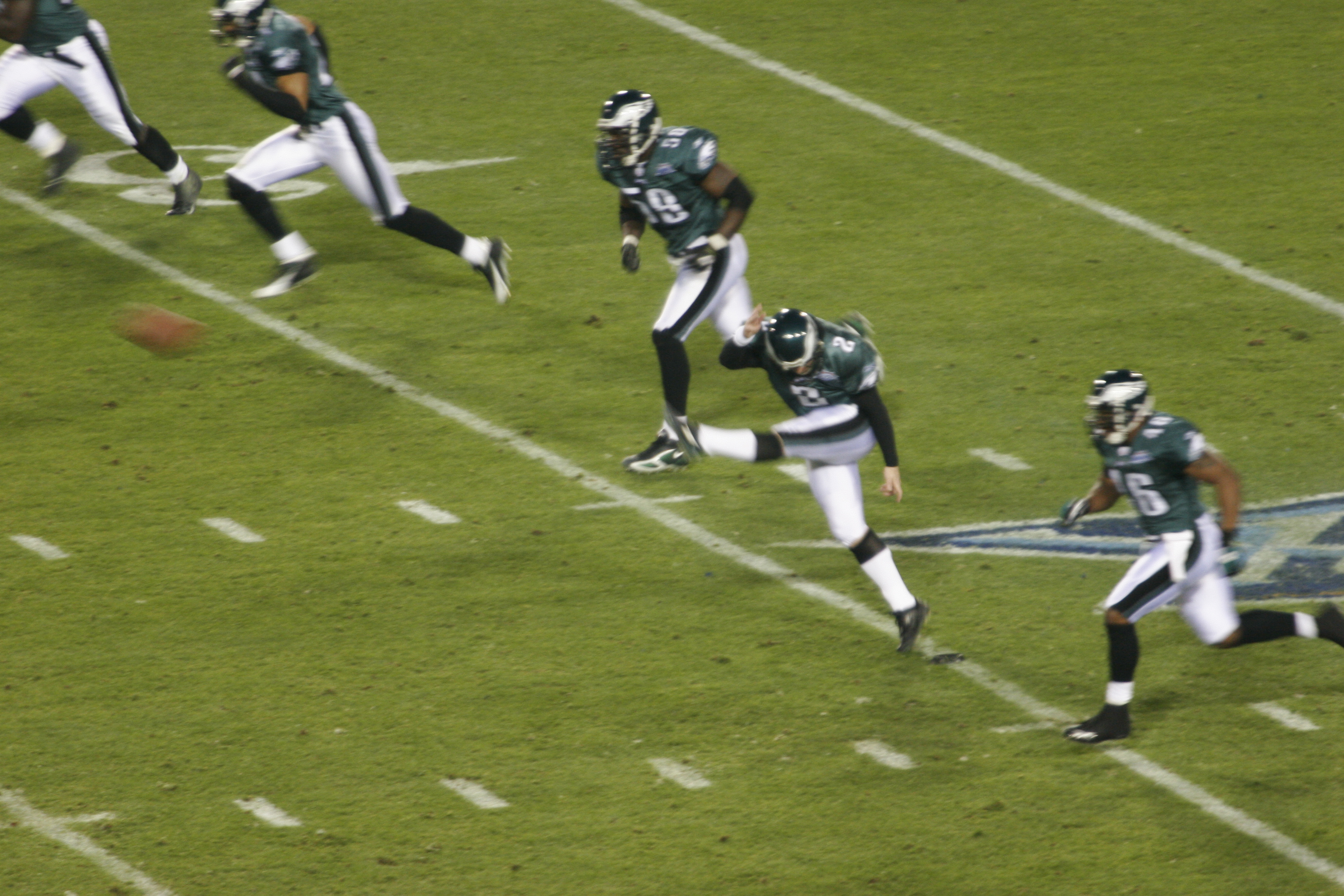
Philadelphia kicks off after scoring a touchdown

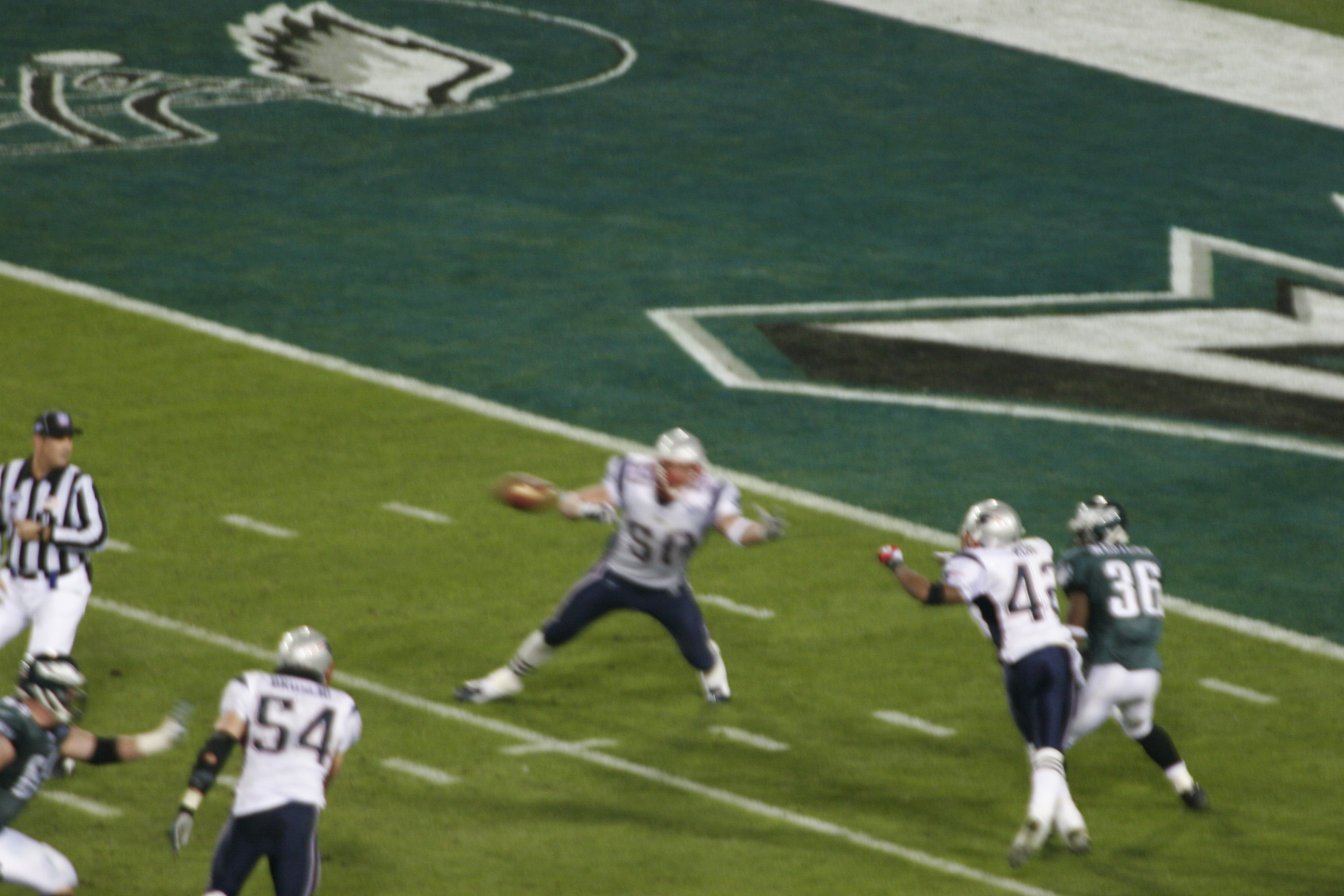
Brian Westbrook's touchdown catch (photo 1 of 2)

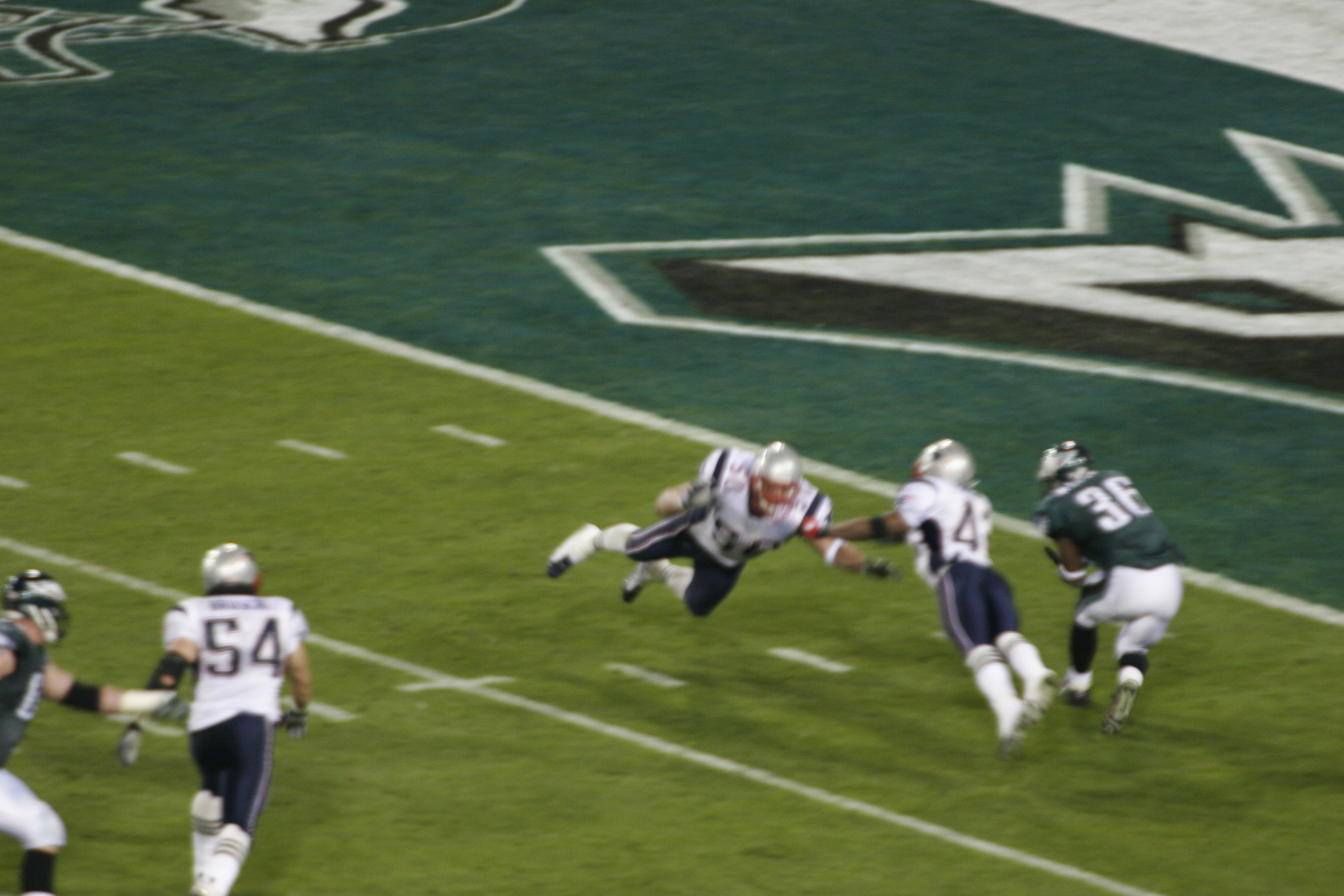
Brian Westbrook's touchdown catch (photo 2 of 2)

=== Box score ===
Super Bowl XXXIX: New England Patriots 24, Philadelphia Eagles 21

| Quarter | 1 | 2 | 3 | 4 | Total |
|---|---|---|---|---|---|
| Patriots (AFC) | 0 | 7 | 7 | 10 | 24 |
| Eagles (NFC) | 0 | 7 | 7 | 7 | 21 |

at Alltel Stadium, Jacksonville, Florida

- Date: February 6, 2005
- Game time: 6:38 p.m. EST
- Game weather: 59 °F (15 °C), clear

Scoring summary

| Quarter | Time | Drive | | | Team | Scoring information | Score | |
| Quarter | Time | Plays | Yards | TOP | Team | Scoring information | NE | PHI |
|---|---|---|---|---|---|---|---|---|
| 2 | 9:55 | 9 | 81 | 4:36 | PHI | L. J. Smith 6-yard touchdown reception from Donovan McNabb, David Akers kick good | 0 | 7 |
| 2 | 1:10 | 7 | 37 | 3:15 | NE | David Givens 4-yard touchdown reception from Tom Brady, Adam Vinatieri kick good | 7 | 7 |
| 3 | 11:04 | 9 | 69 | 3:56 | NE | Mike Vrabel 2-yard touchdown reception from Brady, Vinatieri kick good | 14 | 7 |
| 3 | 3:35 | 10 | 74 | 4:17 | PHI | Brian Westbrook 10-yard touchdown reception from McNabb, Akers kick good | 14 | 14 |
| 4 | 13:44 | 9 | 66 | 4:51 | NE | Corey Dillon 2-yard touchdown run, Vinatieri kick good | 21 | 14 |
| 4 | 8:40 | 8 | 43 | 3:49 | NE | 22-yard field goal by Vinatieri | 24 | 14 |
| 4 | 1:48 | 13 | 79 | 3:52 | PHI | Greg Lewis 30-yard touchdown reception from McNabb, Akers kick good | 24 | 21 |
| "TOP" = time of possession. For other American football terms, see Glossary of American football. | | | | | | | 24 | 21 |

=== Statistical overview ===
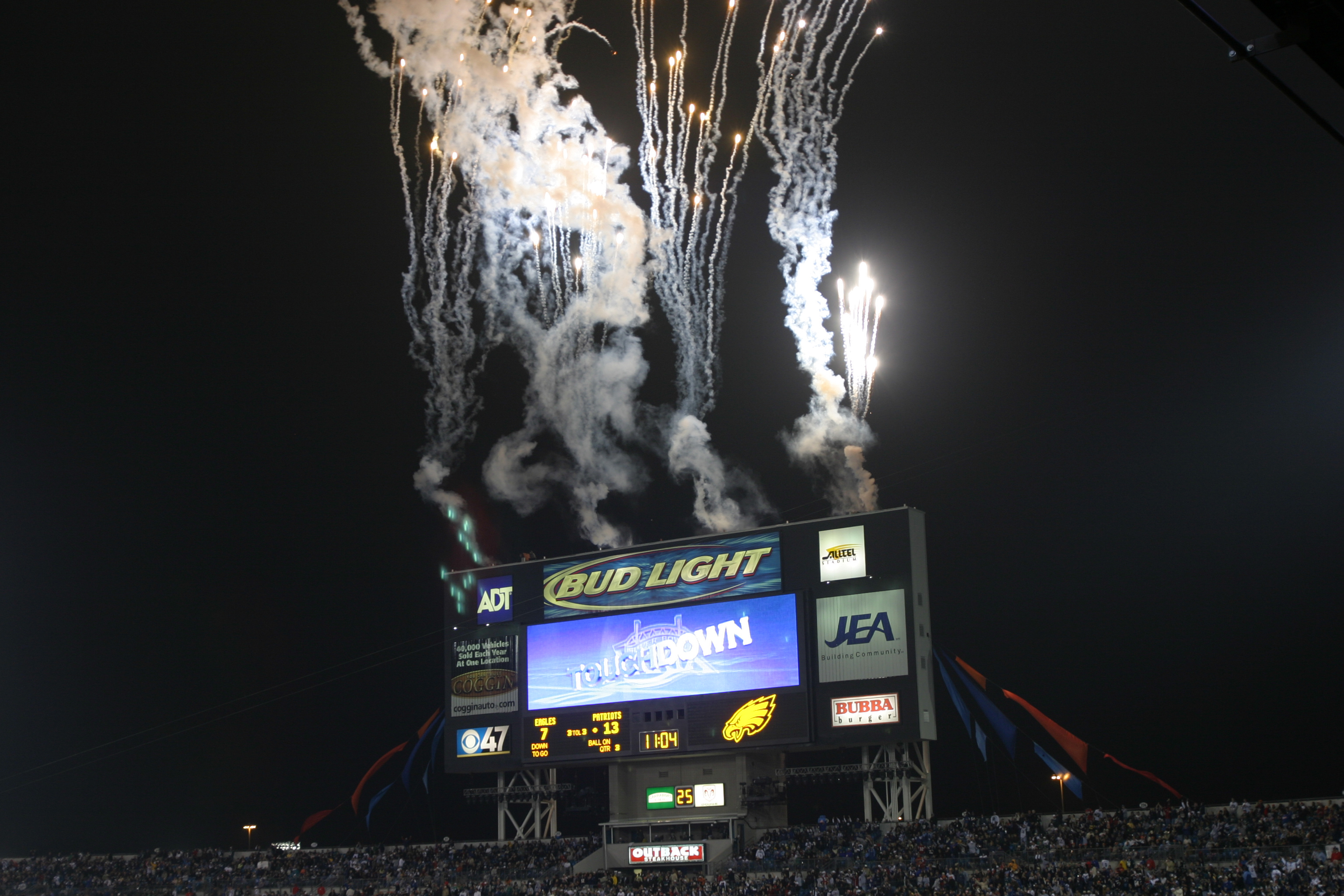
The Patriots score their second touchdown of the game

McNabb completed 30 out of 51 passes for 357 yards and 3 touchdowns, but threw 3 interceptions and was sacked four times. McNabb's 357 yards are tied with Joe Montana for the seventh most in Super Bowl history and third most of any quarterback, as Tom Brady holds both the top and number 2 spot, with 505 yards in Super Bowl LII and 468 yards in Super Bowl LI. Westbrook was the Eagles leading rusher with 44 yards, while also catching 6 passes for 70 yards and a touchdown and returning 3 punts for 19 yards. Pinkston caught 4 passes for 82 yards, while Owens was the Eagles' top receiver with 9 catches for 122 yards, however neither of them scored a touchdown.

Brady completed 23 out of 33 passes for 236 yards and 2 touchdowns. Dillon was the top rusher of the game with 75 yards and a touchdown, and had 3 catches for 31 yards. Running back Kevin Faulk contributed 38 rushing yards and 27 receiving yards.

Branch's Super Bowl record 11 catches tied Cincinnati Bengals' Dan Ross in Super Bowl XVI and San Francisco 49ers' Jerry Rice in Super Bowl XXIII. Coincidentally, all three would later be traded to the Seattle Seahawks: Ross in 1985, Rice in 2004 and Branch in 2006. Branch's combined 21 catches in Super Bowls XXXVIII and XXXIX are the most in back-to-back Super Bowls. Branch also became the third offensive player ever to win Super Bowl MVP honors without scoring a touchdown or throwing a touchdown pass. The other two players were Joe Namath in Super Bowl III and Fred Biletnikoff in Super Bowl XI.^{[5]}

Branch and Terrell Owens each had 100 yards receiving, marking the third time in Super Bowl history, one player from each team had over 100 yards in a Super Bowl. Michael Irvin and Andre Reed were the first in Super Bowl XXVII, and Branch and Muhsin Muhammad the second a year earlier in Super Bowl XXXVIII. Branch also became the fourth player to have at least 100 yards receiving in back-to-back Super Bowls, joining John Stallworth, Jerry Rice and Antonio Freeman. Also, Mike Vrabel and David Givens became just the 14th and 15th players to score a touchdown in consecutive Super Bowls. Vrabel is the most surprising person on this list because he is a linebacker and he scored his on offense. They also became just the 7th and 8th players to catch a touchdown in back-to-back Super Bowls.

With the victory, Tom Brady became just the fourth quarterback to win at least three Super Bowls, along with Terry Bradshaw, Joe Montana and Troy Aikman. Brady also became the fourth quarterback to throw a touchdown pass in three different Super Bowls. Other quarterbacks to do it were Bradshaw, Montana, and John Elway, with Kurt Warner later accomplishing the feat during Super Bowl XLIII and Peyton Manning in Super Bowl XLVIII.

The Patriots joined the Dallas Cowboys as the only teams in NFL history to win three Super Bowls in a span of four years.

Eagles halfback Dorsey Levens retired immediately following this game.

== Aftermath ==
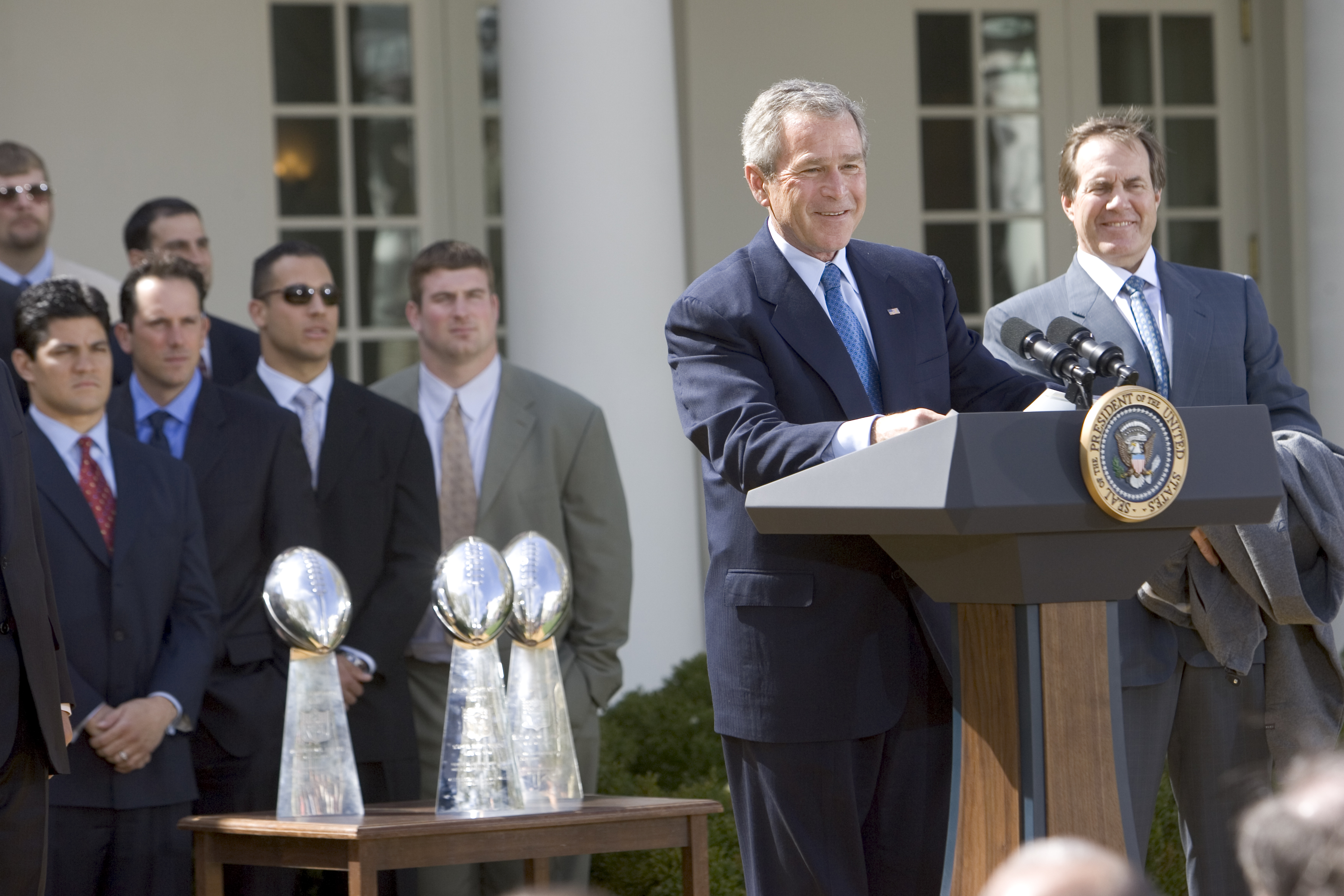
Patriots visiting President George W. Bush in 2005

The Patriots' Super Bowl win was the third championship for Boston-area sports teams in 12 months, following the Patriots winning Super Bowl XXXVIII the year before and the Red Sox winning the World Series – first in 86 years – three months earlier. This marked the first time since 1989–1990 in the San Francisco Bay Area that the same market has had 2 Super Bowl and World Series winners in 12 months.

With the Eagles’ loss, the city of Philadelphia's sports championship drought continued (no Philadelphia-based pro sports team since the 1983 76ers won a title) until the Phillies won the 2008 World Series. The Eagles did not return to the Super Bowl until 2017, when they exacted revenge on the Patriots in Super Bowl LII, defeating them 41–33 and winning their first championship since 1960.

Three years after Super Bowl XXXIX, former Eagles assistant coach Steve Spagnuolo used his learned experience from the game to improve his preparation for Super Bowl XLII against the heavily favored 18-0 Patriots as the New York Giants defensive coordinator. The Giants deterred possible Patriots gamesmanship attempts to read the Giants' defensive play calls by using two signal callers instead of one, and the Giants disguised their blitzes until few seconds remained before the snap, leaving the Patriots offense less time to adjust. The Giants sacked Brady five times and won 17-14, and Super Bowl XLII is considered one of the biggest upsets in NFL history.

== Final statistics ==
Sources: NFL.com Super Bowl XXXIX, Super Bowl XXXIX Play Finder NE, Super Bowl XXXIX Play Finder Phi

=== Statistical comparison ===
| | New England Patriots | Philadelphia Eagles |
|---|---|---|
| First downs | 21 | 24 |
| First downs rushing | 6 | 4 |
| First downs passing | 14 | 18 |
| First downs penalty | 1 | 2 |
| Third down efficiency | 4/12 | 9/16 |
| Fourth down efficiency | 0/0 | 0/0 |
| Net yards rushing | 112 | 45 |
| Rushing attempts | 28 | 17 |
| Yards per rush | 4.0 | 2.6 |
| Passing – Completions–attempts | 23/33 | 30/51 |
| Times sacked–total yards | 2–17 | 4–33 |
| Interceptions thrown | 0 | 3 |
| Net yards passing | 219 | 324 |
| Total net yards | 331 | 369 |
| Punt returns–total yards | 4–26 | 3–19 |
| Kickoff returns–total yards | 4–63 | 5–114 |
| Interceptions–total return yards | 3–5 | 0–0 |
| Punts–average yardage | 7–45.1 | 5–42.8 |
| Fumbles–lost | 1–1 | 2–1 |
| Penalties–yards | 7–47 | 3–35 |
| Time of possession | 31:37 | 28:23 |
| Turnovers | 1 | 4 |

=== Individual statistics ===
Patriots passing
| | C/ATT^{1} | Yds | TD | INT | Rating |
|---|---|---|---|---|---|
| Tom Brady | 23/33 | 236 | 2 | 0 | 110.2 |
Patriots rushing
| | Car^{2} | Yds | TD | LG^{3} | Yds/Car |
| Corey Dillon | 18 | 75 | 1 | 25 | 4.17 |
| Kevin Faulk | 8 | 38 | 0 | 12 | 4.75 |
| Patrick Pass | 1 | 0 | 0 | 0 | 0.00 |
| Tom Brady | 1 | –1 | 0 | –1 | –1.00 |
Patriots receiving
| | Rec^{4} | Yds | TD | LG^{3} | Target^{5} |
| Deion Branch | 11 | 133 | 0 | 27 | 12 |
| Corey Dillon | 3 | 31 | 0 | 16 | 4 |
| David Givens | 3 | 19 | 1 | 13 | 7 |
| Kevin Faulk | 2 | 27 | 0 | 14 | 2 |
| Troy Brown | 2 | 17 | 0 | 12 | 2 |
| Daniel Graham | 1 | 7 | 0 | 7 | 1 |
| Mike Vrabel | 1 | 2 | 1 | 2t | 1 |
| David Patten | 0 | 0 | 0 | 0 | 4 |

Eagles passing
| | C/ATT^{1} | Yds | TD | INT | Rating |
|---|---|---|---|---|---|
| Donovan McNabb | 30/51 | 357 | 3 | 3 | 75.4 |
Eagles rushing
| | Car^{2} | Yds | TD | LG^{3} | Yds/Car |
| Brian Westbrook | 15 | 44 | 0 | 22 | 2.93 |
| Dorsey Levens | 1 | 1 | 0 | 1 | 1.00 |
| Donovan McNabb | 1 | 0 | 0 | 0 | 0.00 |
Eagles receiving
| | Rec^{4} | Yds | TD | LG^{3} | Target^{5} |
| Terrell Owens | 9 | 122 | 0 | 36 | 14 |
| Brian Westbrook | 7 | 60 | 1 | 15 | 11 |
| Todd Pinkston | 4 | 82 | 0 | 40 | 7 |
| Greg Lewis | 4 | 53 | 1 | 30t | 5 |
| L. J. Smith | 4 | 27 | 1 | 9 | 8 |
| Freddie Mitchell | 1 | 11 | 0 | 11 | 4 |
| Josh Parry | 1 | 2 | 0 | 2 | 1 |
| Dorsey Levens | 0 | 0 | 0 | 0 | 1 |

^{1}Completions/attempts ^{2}Carries ^{3}Long gain ^{4}Receptions ^{5}Times targeted

== Starting lineups ==
Hall of Fame‡

| New England | Position | Position | Philadelphia |
|---|---|---|---|
Offense
| David Givens | WR | | Todd Pinkston |
| Matt Light | LT | | Tra Thomas |
| Joe Andruzzi | LG | | Artis Hicks |
| Dan Koppen | C | | Hank Fraley |
| Stephen Neal | RG | | Jermane Mayberry |
| Brandon Gorin | RT | | Jon Runyan |
| Daniel Graham | TE | | L. J. Smith |
| Deion Branch | WR | | Terrell Owens‡ |
| Tom Brady | QB | | Donovan McNabb |
| Corey Dillon | RB | | Brian Westbrook |
| Patrick Pass | FB | | Josh Parry |
Defense
| Rosevelt Colvin | OLB | LDE | Derrick Burgess |
| Vince Wilfork | NT | LDT | Corey Simon |
| Jarvis Green | RE | RDT | Darwin Walker |
| Mike Vrabel | OLB | RDE | Jevon Kearse |
| Tedy Bruschi | ILB | WLB | Keith Adams |
| Roman Phifer | ILB | MLB | Jeremiah Trotter |
| Willie McGinest | OLB | SLB | Dhani Jones |
| Randall Gay | LCB | | Lito Sheppard |
| Asante Samuel | RCB | | Sheldon Brown |
| Rodney Harrison | SS | | Michael Lewis |
| Eugene Wilson | FS | | Brian Dawkins‡ |

== Commercials ==
As usual, the television coverage of this year's Super Bowl was the showcase for the most expensive commercials in television—both to produce and to buy airtime (at the rate of $2.4 million US for 30 seconds).

One ad that drew the ire of many—including the NFL—was for the internet domain provider Go Daddy, which tweaked the controversial halftime of the previous year's game with a mock censorship hearing featuring a comely woman, Nikki Cappelli (played by WWE Wrestler Candice Michelle), having a "wardrobe malfunction". Fox pulled the second airing of the ad, scheduled for the two-minute warning of the fourth quarter, along with a five-second plug, and it was replaced with a promo for The Simpsons. The Scottsdale, Arizona-based World Wide Web domain registration company got a refund on the second ad.

Another popular ad was made by the NFL. It featured players who were not in the Super Bowl, headlined by Pittsburgh Steelers rookie quarterback Ben Roethlisberger being at a beach resort, depressed he did not make it in. Joe Montana comforted Roethlisberger, and soon both Montana and Roethlisberger joined many other players in different locations in an off-key yet rousing edition of "Tomorrow" from the musical Annie. The commercial ended with the tagline: "Tomorrow, we're all undefeated again." Roethlisberger went on to lead the Steelers to victory in Super Bowl XL the very next season.

The top ad, as chosen by the USA Today Super Bowl Ad Meter was for Anheuser-Busch's Bud Light featuring a timid skydiver making his first jump getting enticed with a six-pack of the product. This ad was ranked second on ADBOWL. The highest ranked commercial by ADBOWL was Anheuser-Busch's "Applause."

For the first time since the campaign started in Super Bowl XXI, no "I'm going to Disney World!" ad aired following Super Bowl XXXIX.

== Player bonuses ==
Each member of the Patriots received a payment of $68,000 for winning the game. The Eagles each received $36,500. When adjusted for inflation, the Patriots salary was actually less than the $15,000 paid to members of the Green Bay Packers for winning Super Bowl I in 1967. That amount of money in 1967 equated to approximately $85,000 in 2005.

== Officials ==
- Referee: Terry McAulay #77 first Super Bowl
- Umpire: Carl Paganelli #124 first Super Bowl
- Head linesman: Gary Slaughter #30 first Super Bowl
- Line judge: Mark Steinkerchner #84 second Super Bowl (XXXVII)
- Field judge: Tom Sifferman #118 third Super Bowl (XXXVII, XXXVIII)
- Side judge: Rick Patterson #15 second Super Bowl (XXXVII)
- Back judge: Tony Steratore #112 first Super Bowl
- Alternate referee: Ed Hochuli #85 (referee for XXXII, XXXVIII)
- Alternate umpire: Garth DeFelice #53
- Alternate field judge: Larry Rose #128

Note: Tom Sifferman became the first, and so far only, official to work three consecutive Super Bowls.
