= Hotel Albert =

Hotel Albert may refer to:

In the United States

- Hotel Albert (New York, New York), listed on the National Register of Historic Places (NRHP) in Manhattan
- Hotel Albert Commercial Block, Walterboro, South Carolina, listed on the NRHP in Colleton County
- Hotel Albert (Salt Lake City, Utah), listed on the NRHP in Salt Lake City, Utah
