= William Driffle =

American politician (1826–1890)

William A. Driffle (February 20, 1826 - June 9, 1890) was a member of the South Carolina House of Representatives during the Reconstruction era, representing Colleton County.

He is buried in Walterboro's Live Oak Cemetery.
