= Fripp-Fishburne House =

Historic house in South Carolina, United States

- U.S. Historic district – Contributing property
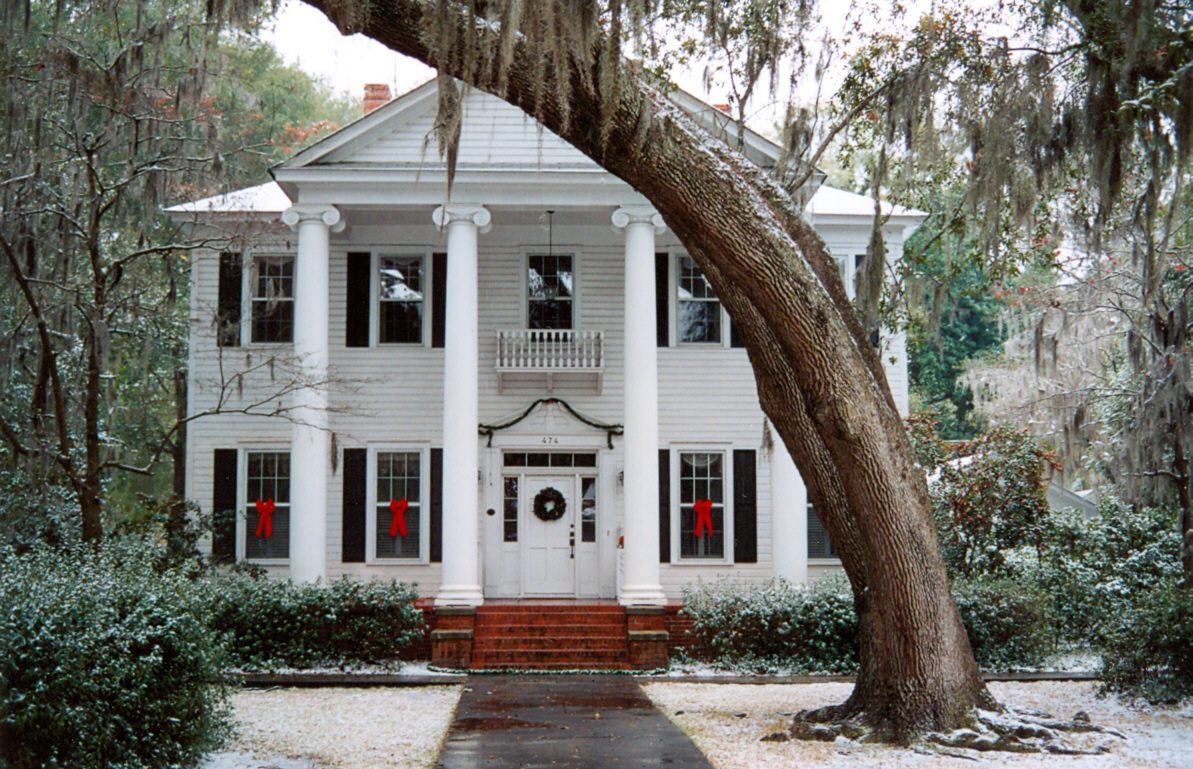
- Front of the house

- Location within South Carolina Location within the United States
- Location: 474 Hampton St., Walterboro, South Carolina
- Coordinates: 32°54′6″N 80°39′40.8″W
- Built: 1889
- Architectural style: Greek Revival
- Part of: Walterboro Historic District (ID96000713)
- Added to NRHP: November 10, 1980

The Fripp-Fishburne House is a historic building in Walterboro, South Carolina, United States (32°54′15″N 80°39′58″W). Built in 1889, it has been renovated several times and currently serves as a private residence.

The house is located at 474 Hampton Street, in the Walterboro historic district, which is about an hour drive from either Charleston, South Carolina or Savannah, Georgia.

The house was originally a one-story home built by Lewis Fripp in 1889. A second story was added in the early 1900s. The Fishburne family next owned the house for over half a century. In 1962, John Hiott purchased the house and renovated it. The next owners were Dan Yarbrough (1994–1999) and Roberto Refinetti (1999- ).

The front porch, with its four Ionic columns is typical of southern plantation homes. The house has approximately 5,000 square feet (460 m^{2}) of living space in two stories and a finished attic that serves as a third floor. Its grandiose façade, subtly concealed by century-old oak trees naturally decorated with hanging Spanish moss, provides it with the distinction of being the most photographed house in town. Photographs of the Fripp-Fishburne house have appeared in numerous tourist brochures, newspapers, books, magazines, and travel guides.
