= Norman Hand =

American football player (1972–2010)

No. 98, 96, 99, 95
- Position: Defensive tackle

Personal information
- Born: September 4, 1972; Queens, New York, U.S.
- Died: May 14, 2010 (aged 37); Walterboro, South Carolina, U.S.
- Listed height: 6 ft 3 in (1.91 m)
- Listed weight: 310 lb (141 kg)

Career information
- High school: Walterboro (Walterboro, South Carolina)
- College: Itawamba Junior College (1991–1992); Ole Miss (1993–1993)
- NFL draft: 1995: 5th round, 158th overall pick

Career history
- Miami Dolphins (1995–1996); San Diego Chargers (1997–1999); New Orleans Saints (2000–2002); Seattle Seahawks (2003); New York Giants (2004)

Career NFL statistics
- Tackles: 285
- Sacks: 22.5
- Forced fumbles: 2
- Stats at Pro Football Reference

Norman Lamont Hand (September 4, 1972 – May 14, 2010) was an American professional football defensive tackle in the National Football League (NFL). He was selected in the fifth round of the 1995 NFL draft. He last played with the New York Giants in 2004. He also played with the Seattle Seahawks, the New Orleans Saints, the San Diego Chargers and the Miami Dolphins. With the Saints, Hand was part of a defensive line nicknamed "The Heavy Lunch Bunch", along with fellow 325-pounders Martin Chase and Grady Jackson. Hand was noted for his "Big Wiggle" celebration dance, and in 2000 he was part of the team that won the Saints' first playoff game.

== Early life ==
At Walterboro High School in Walterboro, South Carolina, Hand earned three letters in football, and also played baseball. As a senior, he was an honorable mention All-America selection by Parade and USA Today, and was the South Carolina High School Defensive Lineman of the Year. As a junior tight end, he caught 25 passes for 526 yards (21.04 yards per reception average).

== College career ==
At Itawamba Junior College in Mississippi, he finished his two-year career with 18 sacks, 135 tackles, 33 tackles for loss, four forced fumbles, and three fumble recoveries.

Hand was a two-year starter at the University of Mississippi after transferring from Itawamba Junior College. As a senior, he posted 3.5 sacks, 61 tackles (three for losses), one interception, and one fumble recovery, and was a second-team All-SEC selection.

== NFL career statistics ==
Legend
**Bold**	Career high

=== Regular season ===
Year	Team	Games		Tackles				Interceptions				Fumbles			
Year	Team	GP	GS	Comb	Solo	Ast	Sck	Int	Yds	TD	Lng	FF	FR	Yds	TD
1996	MIA	9	0	5	2	3	0.5	0	0	0	0	0	**1**	**8**	0
1997	SDG	15	1	19	16	3	1.0	0	0	0	0	0	0	0	0
1998	SDG	16	16	49	42	7	**6.0**	**2**	**47**	0	**30**	**1**	0	0	0
1999	SDG	14	14	**55**	41	**14**	4.0	0	0	0	0	0	0	0	0
2000	NOR	15	15	54	**44**	10	3.0	0	0	0	0	**1**	0	0	0
2001	NOR	13	13	36	25	11	3.5	0	0	0	0	0	0	0	0
2002	NOR	16	13	39	30	9	2.5	0	0	0	0	0	0	0	0
2003	SEA	6	4	10	4	6	1.0	0	0	0	0	0	0	0	0
2004	NYG	11	11	18	13	5	1.0	0	0	0	0	0	0	0	0
Career		115	87	285	217	68	22.5	2	47	0	30	2	1	8	0

=== Playoffs ===
Year	Team	Games		Tackles				Interceptions				Fumbles			
Year	Team	GP	GS	Comb	Solo	Ast	Sck	Int	Yds	TD	Lng	FF	FR	Yds	TD
2000	NOR	2	2	9	5	4	0.0	0	0	0	0	0	0	0	0
Career		2	2	9	5	4	0.0	0	0	0	0	0	0	0	0

== Death ==
Hand died on May 14, 2010, from hypertensive heart disease, after collapsing at his house in Walterboro.
