= Hickory Valley Historic District =

Historic district in South Carolina, United States

- U.S. National Register of Historic Places
- U.S. Historic district
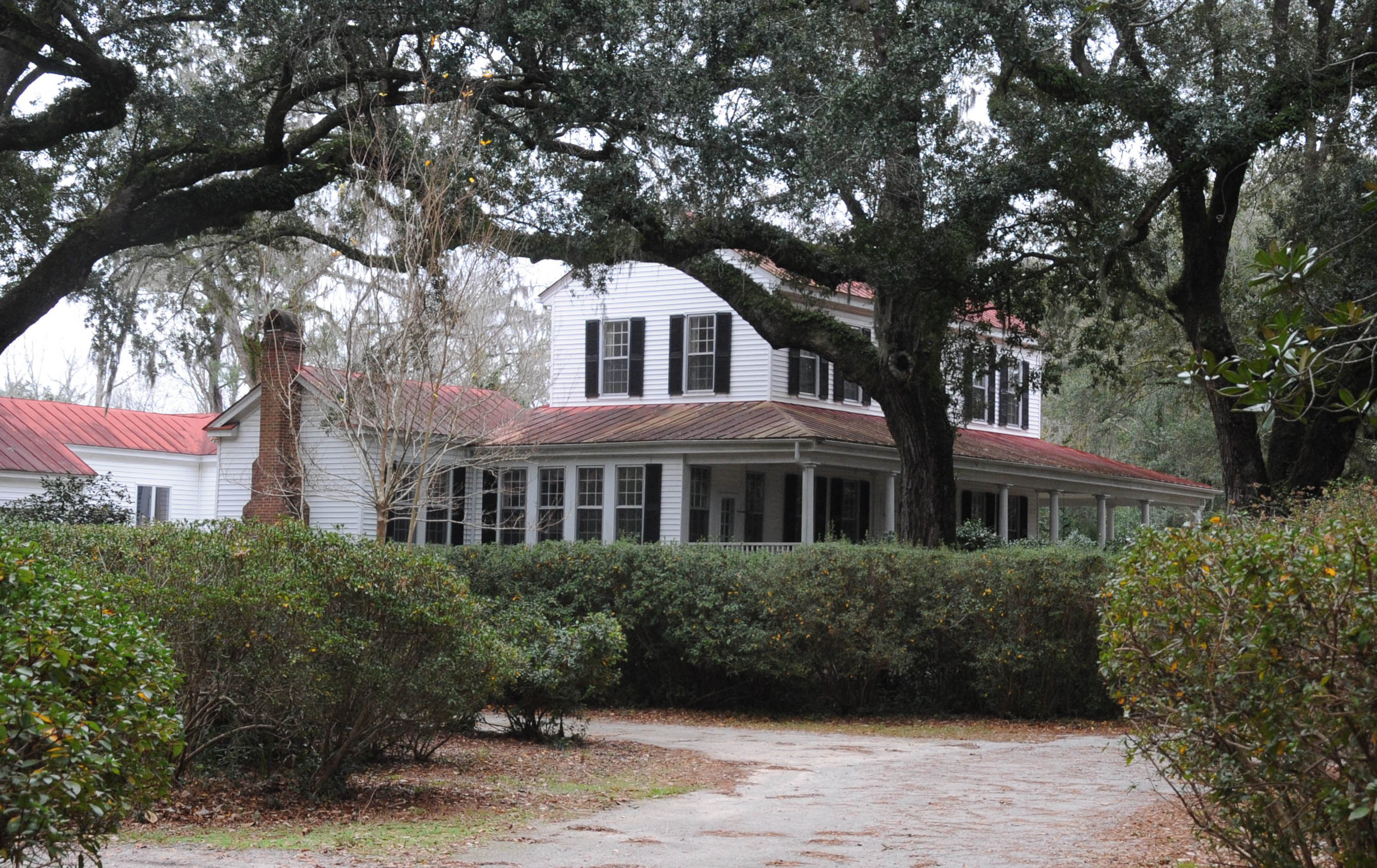
- Elmore-Henderson House

- Location within South Carolina Location within the United States
- Location: Roughly bounded by Ireland Creek, Jeffries Blvd., Wichman, Verdier and Ivanhoe Sts., Walterboro, South Carolina
- Coordinates: 32°54′26″N 80°39′42″W
- Area: 80 acres (32 ha)
- Built: 1930
- Architect: Bensant & Barbot
- Architectural style: Federal Revival
- NRHP reference No.: 80003666
- Added to NRHP: November 21, 1980

Hickory Valley Historic District is a national historic district located at Walterboro, Colleton County, South Carolina. The district encompasses 16 contributing buildings in Walterboro. The majority of the properties in the district are residences constructed between 1821 and 1929 which includes a concentration of early homes dating from Walterboro's heyday as a pineland resort village for lowcountry planters. The architectural styles in the district include Federal, Greek Revival, Victorian carpenter, Neo-Classical and Federal Revival. The district is important historically for its associations with Walterboro's founders as well as with several generations of prominent Walterboro families.

It was listed on the National Register of Historic Places in 1980.
