= Mary Shaffer =

American artist (born 1947)

- Born: 1943 (age 82–83); Walterboro, South Carolina, US
- Known for: Studio glass

Mary Shaffer (born 1943) is an American artist who has worked primarily with glass since the 1970s. She was an early artist in the American Studio Glass Movement. Her works often take slumped (or molten) form, in which found objects are embedded in the glass. She has work in the collections of the Corning Museum of Glass and the Metropolitan Museum of Art.

== Life ==
Shaffer was born in 1943 in Walterboro, South Carolina, and grew up in South America. She studied illustration and painting, earning her B.F.A. in Illustration in 1965 from the Rhode Island School of Design (RISD).

Shaffer has taught at RISD, Wellesley College, and New York University as the Director of the Crafts Program in the 1970s and 1980s. She also managed the Art Center at the University of Maryland.

== Work ==
Shaffer's first experiments were with plate glass slumped over metal bars that were originally intended to be a canvas for painting. During her time in Providence, RI, Shaffer experimented further to test glass' reaction under various conditions, and how it could be manipulated and combined with other materials. The early metal forms used were predominantly made using found objects such as discarded nails, spikes, brick, pulleys and wire. Instead of manipulating the glass herself, Shaffer used gravity creating natural shapes made as a result of heat being applied to glass.
