= Colleton County High School =

Location
- 150 Cougar Nation Dr; Walterboro, South Carolina 29488; United States
- Coordinates: 32°56′20″N 80°38′22″W

Information
- Type: Public high school
- School district: Colleton County School District
- Teaching staff: 81.50 (FTE)
- Grades: 9–12
- Enrollment: 1,396 (2023-2024)
- Student to teacher ratio: 17.13
- Campus type: Rural
- Colors: Navy and silver
- Mascot: Cougar
- Feeder schools: Colleton County Middle
- Website: cchs.colleton.k12.sc.us

Colleton County High School (formed from the merging of Walterboro High School and Ruffin High School) is a public high school in Walterboro, South Carolina. It is the only public high school in Colleton County and is one of the largest high schools by enrollment in the state, despite being located in a mostly rural county. The school has a population of 1,497 students, in grades 9-12. It has a student teacher ratio of 23 to 1. The school is a part of the Colleton County School District.

The district's boundary, and therefore the attendance boundary of the high school, is that of the county.

== Academics ==
In 2014, the average student-teacher ratio in core subjects was 26.2:1.

Colleton County High School is accredited with the Southern Association of Colleges and Schools.

== Athletics ==
The Colleton County High School Cougars compete in the Class AAAA Region 7 division of the South Carolina High School League.

== Student activities ==
CCHS students participate in wrestling, football, basketball, baseball, softball, golf, track, soccer, and tennis.

=== Band of Blue ===
The "Band of Blue" has won the South Carolina State Marching Band Championships in 1982, 1986, 1989, 1990, 1991, 1992, 1993, 1995, and 1997. The band has performed for one presidential inaugural and four gubernatorial inaugurals. In 1994, the Band of Blue marched in the 105th Tournament of Roses Parade in Pasadena, California. In 2000, the Band of Blue marched in the 74th annual Macy's Thanksgiving Day Parade. The Band of Blue was also featured in the 2008 and 2019 National Cherry Blossom Festival Parade in Washington, DC. Most recently, the Band of Blue marched in the 2010 Endymion Parade in New Orleans, Louisiana, behind Tom Benson, the parade marshal and owner of the New Orleans Saints and in front of the NFL team themselves.

=== CCHS Chorus ===
In March 2010, the CCHS Singers chorus performed a Mozart piece at Carnegie Hall in New York City.

== Notable alumni ==
- Norman Hand – former football player for Walterboro High School, University of Mississippi; retired professional football player
- Alexis Manigo – Woman abducted as an infant and raised by kidnapper.
- Darwin Walker – former Walterboro High School, University of Tennessee retired professional football player
