= Colleton County School District =

School district in South Carolina, United States

Address
- 500 Forest Circle Walterboro, South Carolina, 29488; United States

District information
- Type: Public
- Grades: PreK–12
- NCES District ID: 4501830

Students and staff
- Students: 5,138
- Teachers: 345.27
- Staff: 378.8
- Student–teacher ratio: 14.88

Other information
- Website: colleton.k12.sc.us

Colleton County School District is a school district headquartered in Walterboro, South Carolina. It serves all of Colleton County.

== Schools ==
Secondary (all residents are assigned to these two schools)

- Colleton County High School
- Colleton County Middle School

Elementary schools:

- Bells Elementary School
- Cottageville Elementary School
- Forest Hills Elementary School
- Hendersonville Elementary School
- Northside Elementary School

Early childhood:

- Black Street Early Childhood Center

Other:

- Colleton County Adult Education
- Colleton County Alternative School
- Thunderbolt Career & Technology Center
