= Walterboro Library Society Building =

- U.S. National Register of Historic Places
- U.S. Historic district – Contributing property
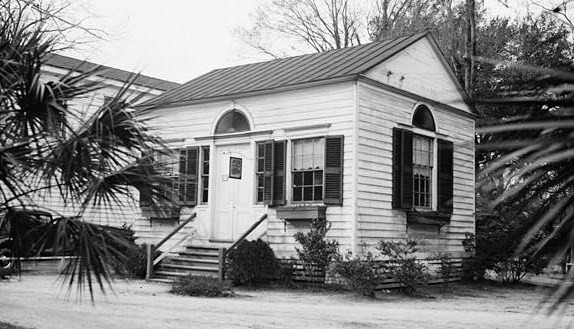
- Library, HABS Photo, 1934

- Location within South Carolina Location within the United States
- Location: 801 Wichman St., Walterboro, South Carolina
- Coordinates: 32°54′12″N 80°39′8″W
- Area: 0.3 acres (0.12 ha)
- Built: 1820
- NRHP reference No.: 71000767
- Added to NRHP: October 14, 1971

Walterboro Library Society Building is a historic library building located at Walterboro, Colleton County, South Carolina. It was built in 1820, and is a small, white, Federal style frame building with a side-gabled roof. The front façade features a Palladian-style door surround capped by a fanlight. The building is occupied by the Colleton County Historical Society. When Walterboro was incorporated in 1826, the town boundaries were established as "3/4 of a mile in every direction from the Walterboro Library."

It was listed in the National Register of Historic Places in 1971. It is located in the Walterboro Historic District.
