= Martin Chase =

American football player (born 1974)

No. 92, 78
- Position: Defensive tackle

Personal information
- Born: December 19, 1974 (age 51); Lawton, Oklahoma, U.S.
- Listed height: 6 ft 2 in (1.88 m)
- Listed weight: 310 lb (141 kg)

Career information
- High school: Eisenhower (Lawton)
- College: Oklahoma
- NFL draft: 1998: 5th round, 124th overall pick

Career history
- Baltimore Ravens (1998–1999); Frankfurt Galaxy (2000); New Orleans Saints (2000–2002); Washington Redskins (2003); New York Giants (2004); Jacksonville Jaguars (2005)

Awards and highlights
- Second-team All-Big 12 (1997)

Career NFL statistics
- Tackles: 60
- Sacks: 1
- Stats at Pro Football Reference

Cecil Martin Chase (born December 19, 1974) is an American former professional football player who was a defensive tackle in the National Football League (NFL). He was selected in the fifth round of the 1998 NFL draft. With the New Orleans Saints he was part of a defensive line nicknamed "the Heavy Lunch Bunch", along with fellow 325-pounders Norman Hand and Grady Jackson. He played college football for the Oklahoma Sooners.
