= Neyles, South Carolina =

- Unincorporated community
- Location within South Carolina Location within the United States
- Coordinates: 32°49′31″N 80°33′30″W
- Country: United States
- State: South Carolina
- County: Colleton
- Elevation: 23 ft (7.0 m)
- Time zone: UTC-5 (Eastern (EST))
  - Summer (DST): UTC-4 (EDT)
- Area codes: 843, 854
- GNIS feature ID: 1249870

Neyles (also Neyles Cross Roads) is an unincorporated community in Colleton County, South Carolina, United States. It is located along South Carolina Highway 64 southeast of Walterboro, and northeast of Ritter.

The Ravenwood Plantation is located near Neyles.
