= St. James the Greater Catholic Mission =

- U.S. National Register of Historic Places
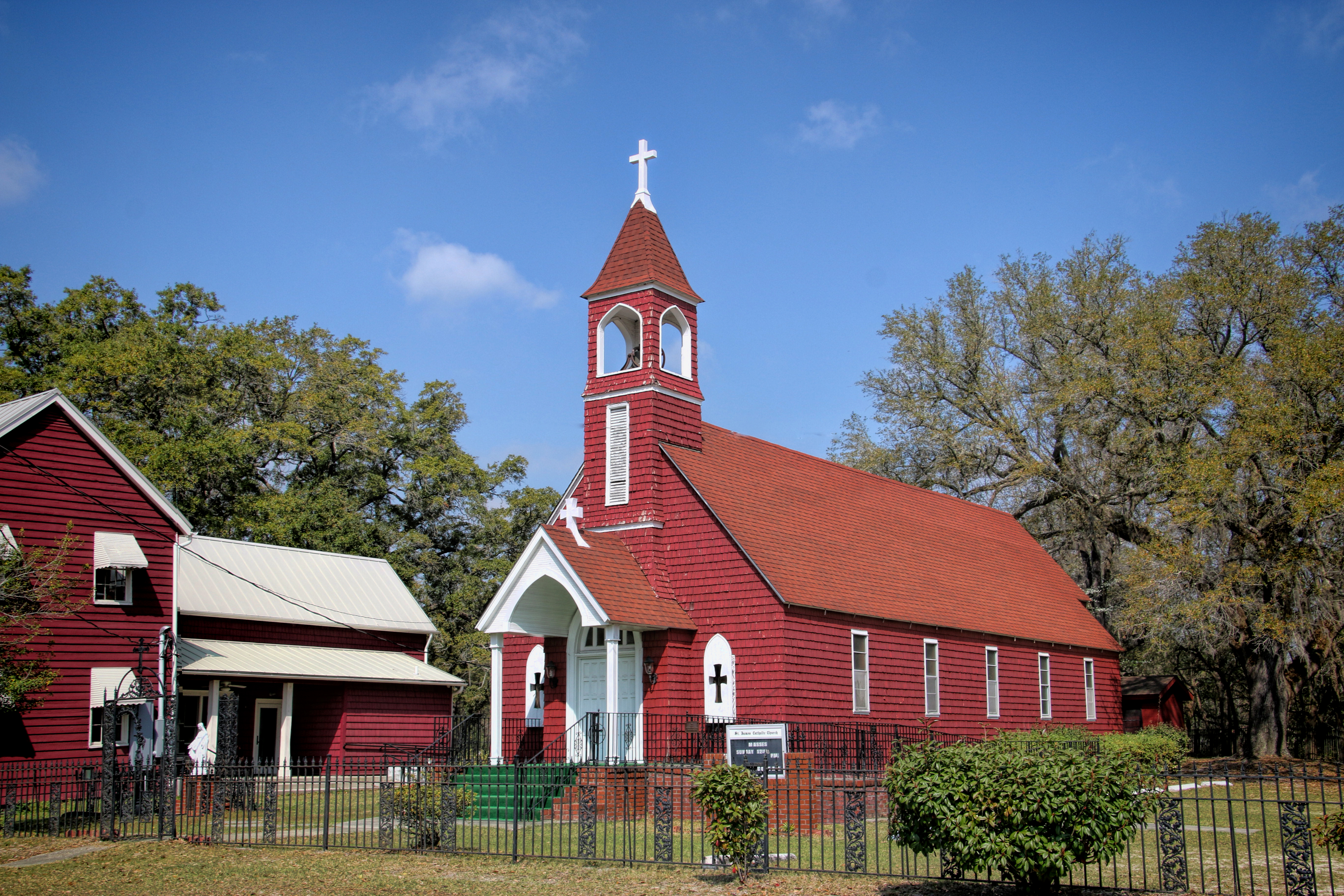

- Location within South Carolina Location within the United States
- Location: 3087 Ritter Rd., south of Walterboro, South Carolina
- Coordinates: 32°46′36″N 80°39′44″W
- Area: 1 acre (0.40 ha)
- Built: 1833
- Architectural style: Gothic Revival
- NRHP reference No.: 15000676
- Added to NRHP: September 29, 2015

The St. James the Greater Catholic Mission is a Black Catholic church in southern Colleton County, South Carolina. The site has been used since 1833 by an African-American congregation, and is extremely rare for its remarkably intact campus.

The property was listed on the National Register of Historic Places in 2015.

== History ==
The parish was established in 1833 by Bishop John England, after a number of local plantation owners and their slaves converted to the Catholic faith. The church was burned down in 1856, and the slavers moved away soon thereafter when their slaves were freed.

The slaves, on the other hand, largely remained and kept the faith despite the lack of a building or priest. One particularly zealous man, Vincent de Paul Davis, served as the local catechist, godfathering many young children baptized into the faith at churches in surrounding areas.

In 1892, Fr Daniel Berberich, SAC, came across the community and began to celebrate Mass for them and helped them build a new church in 1894. Soon after a school was added. The present building came in 1935.

== Building ==
The complex includes a shingled Gothic Revival church built in 1935, a small school building dating to 1901, and cemetery with burials dating back to 1835.

== In popular media ==
A documentary on the church and its community, "We Came A Long Way By Faith: Catholic Hill and St. James the Greater Catholic Church", was released in 2020.

== See also ==
- National Register of Historic Places listings in Colleton County, South Carolina
