= Walterboro Historic District =

Historic district in South Carolina, United States

- U.S. National Register of Historic Places
- U.S. Historic district
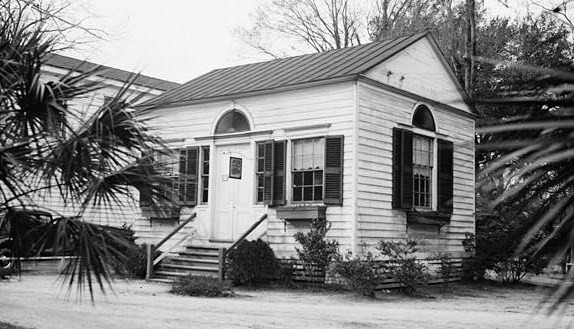
- Walterboro Library Society Building in 1934

- Location within South Carolina Location within the United States
- Location: Roughly bounded by Jeffries Blvd., Sanders, Black, Church, Valley and Lemacks Sts., and including 807 Hampton St., Walterboro, South Carolina
- Coordinates: 32°54′5″N 80°38′40″W
- Area: 127 acres (51 ha)
- Architect: James B. Urquhart, J.T. Dabbs
- Architectural style: Bungalow/Craftsman, Greek Revival, Gothic Revival, Late 19th And 20th Century Revivals
- NRHP reference No.: 80003667 (original); 93000433 (increase)

Significant dates
- Added to NRHP: November 10, 1980
- Boundary increase: June 3, 1993

The Walterboro Historic District is a historic district in Walterboro, South Carolina. It was listed on the National Register of Historic Places in 1980 and expanded in 1993 to include the state-owned Walterboro High School at 807 Hampton Street, a building designed by James B. Urquhart and J. T. Dabbs in 1924.

The district also includes the Walterboro Library Society Building, which is separately listed on the NRHP. Other notable contributing properties include Fripp-Fishburne House.
