= FreshMinistries =

Non-profit organization

- Founded: 1994
- Founder: Robert V. Lee
- Type: Non-profit
- Location: Jacksonville, Florida
- Origins: Episcopal Outreach
- Region served: Global
- Method: Outreach
- Key people: Rev. Dr. Robert V. Lee III, Chairman & CEO
- Website: freshministries.org

FreshMinistries is a non-profit organization based in Jacksonville, Florida. The organization focuses on economic development, job training and health initiatives in Jacksonville. FreshMinistries also engages in international projects.

== History ==
The organization was founded in 1994 by the Rev. Dr. Robert V. Lee, III, an Episcopal priest who was rector at Church of Our Saviour (Jacksonville, Florida) for more than a decade. In its early years, the organization focused on programs to promote financial literacy, youth mentoring, housing development and crime prevention, particularly in East Jacksonville.

== Current initiatives ==
FreshMinistries works to achieve the United Nations' Millennium Development Goals (MDG) to eliminate poverty through a number of initiatives. Projects include:

- Fresh Futures Youth Program, helping young people gain life skills and summer employment.
- Fresh Path Youth Program, supporting young adults that have come into contact with the criminal justice system.
- Life Point Career Institute, training unemployed and underemployed individuals for employment in the hospitality and healthcare fields.
- Beaver Street Enterprise Center, a business incubator in the Jacksonville region, launched as an initiative of FreshMinistries with support from the Jacksonville Economic Development Corporation in 2003.
- Aquaponics Programs, an aquaponics training center in Jacksonville raising fish and marketable produce. In 2015, FreshMinistries received a $1.98 million grant from the U.S. Economic Development Administration to launch an aquaponics training center dubbed Island Fresh in the U.S. Virgin Islands, which opened in 2021. Island Fresh, consisting of three 6000-square-foot greenhouses and three 3000-square-foot greenhouses, was made in collaboration with and later formally transferred to the University of the Virgin Islands. As of 2025, FreshMinistries operated four different facilities, with nine other programs in progress across Africa and the United States.

== Local support ==
Tom and Betty Petway made a $1 million gift donation in December 2003. The couple had worked with FreshMinistries since the late 1990s. Petway was CEO of Zurich Insurance Services.

== AIDS grant ==
FreshMinistries received $10 million of $100 million in abstinence-focused grants awarded by the United States Agency for International Development, part of the President Bush's Emergency Plan for AIDS Relief. The grant funded Siyafundisa, an initiative to provide ongoing HIV/AIDS prevention programs in Africa. The grant is the largest the ministry has received.
