= Darwin Walker =

American football player (born 1977)

No. 75, 97, 99, 93
- Position: Defensive tackle

Personal information
- Born: June 15, 1977 (age 49); Walterboro, South Carolina, U.S.
- Listed height: 6 ft 3 in (1.91 m)
- Listed weight: 294 lb (133 kg)

Career information
- High school: Walterboro
- College: Tennessee
- NFL draft: 2000: 3rd round, 71st overall pick

Career history
- Arizona Cardinals (2000); Philadelphia Eagles (2000–2006); Buffalo Bills (2007)*; Chicago Bears (2007); Carolina Panthers (2008)
- * Offseason or practice squad member only

Awards and highlights
- BCS national champion (1998); Third-team All-American (1999); 2× First-team All-SEC (1998, 1999)

Career NFL statistics
- Total tackles: 197
- Sacks: 28.5
- Forced fumbles: 6
- Fumble recoveries: 5
- Interceptions: 1
- Stats at Pro Football Reference

Darwin Jamar Walker (born June 15, 1977) is an American former professional football player who was a defensive tackle in the National Football League (NFL). He was selected by the Arizona Cardinals in the third round of the 2000 NFL draft. He played college football for the Tennessee Volunteers.

In Walker's nine years in the NFL, he played for the Philadelphia Eagles, Buffalo Bills and Chicago Bears. He now works for Fox 29 in Philadelphia as a pre- and post-game analyst for the Philadelphia Eagles. Walker, a civil engineer, is on the board of directors for Pennoni & Associates, an engineering consulting firm.

== Early life ==
Walker went to Walterboro High School in South Carolina and was a letterman in football and track and field. He also set the state record in shot-put, throwing over 63 feet, which has been subsequently broken by 1 inch. Further, he graduated 4th in his 4A High School class.

== Football career ==
=== College football ===
Walker attended North Carolina State University for one year and later transferred to the University of Tennessee, where he won a National Championship with the Tennessee Vols in 1998. During his senior season in 1999, Walker had 39 tackles, 9.5 tackles for loss, and 5.5 sacks.

=== Professional football ===
==== Arizona Cardinals ====
Walker was selected by the Arizona Cardinals with the 71st overall pick in the third round of the 2000 NFL draft, but was released before playing a game.

==== Philadelphia Eagles ====
Subsequently, Walker was claimed off waivers by the Philadelphia Eagles during the 2000 season. The Eagles later signed him to a long-term deal. He played with the Eagles through the 2006 season.

==== Buffalo Bills ====
He was then traded on March 26, 2007 (along with a conditional 2008 draft pick) to the Buffalo Bills for linebacker Takeo Spikes and quarterback Kelly Holcomb. However, there was a proviso to that trade stating that if Walker did not report to Bills training camp by August 5, 2007, he would be returned to the Eagles in exchange for a sixth-round draft pick in 2008. He reportedly held out for a contract extension and never reported to Buffalo's training camp that year.

==== Chicago Bears ====
On July 29, 2007, the Buffalo Bills traded Walker's rights to the Chicago Bears in exchange for a 5th round draft pick in 2008 (which Buffalo later traded to the Jacksonville Jaguars in exchange for Marcus Stroud) (the Bears were in need of a defensive tackle after having waived troubled defensive lineman Tank Johnson in the 2007 offseason).

==== Carolina Panthers ====
On April 28, 2008, he signed with the Carolina Panthers.

==== Career statistics ====
| Year | Games | Tackles | Solo Tackles | Deflects | Sacks | Forced Fumbles | Interceptions | Int Yards | Touchdowns |
|---|---|---|---|---|---|---|---|---|---|
| 2001 | 10 | 4 | 1 | 0 | 1 | 0 | 0 | 0 | 0 |
| 2002 | 16 | 33 | 28 | 2 | 7.5 | 2 | 0 | 0 | 0 |
| 2003 | 16 | 42 | 37 | 5 | 6 | 0 | 0 | 0 | 0 |
| 2004 | 8 | 15 | 12 | 2 | 1 | 1 | 0 | 0 | 0 |
| 2005 | 13 | 25 | 21 | 0 | 3 | 1 | 0 | 0 | 0 |
| 2006 | 16 | 36 | 27 | 4 | 6 | 1 | 1 | 6 | 0 |
| 2007 | 11 | 17 | 12 | 0 | 1 | 0 | 0 | 0 | 0 |
| 2008 | 10 | 10 | 6 | 2 | 0 | 0 | 0 | 0 | 0 |
| Career | 108 | 197 | 154 | 14 | 28.5 | 5 | 1 | 6 | 0 |
