= Hotel Albert Commercial Block =

- U.S. National Register of Historic Places
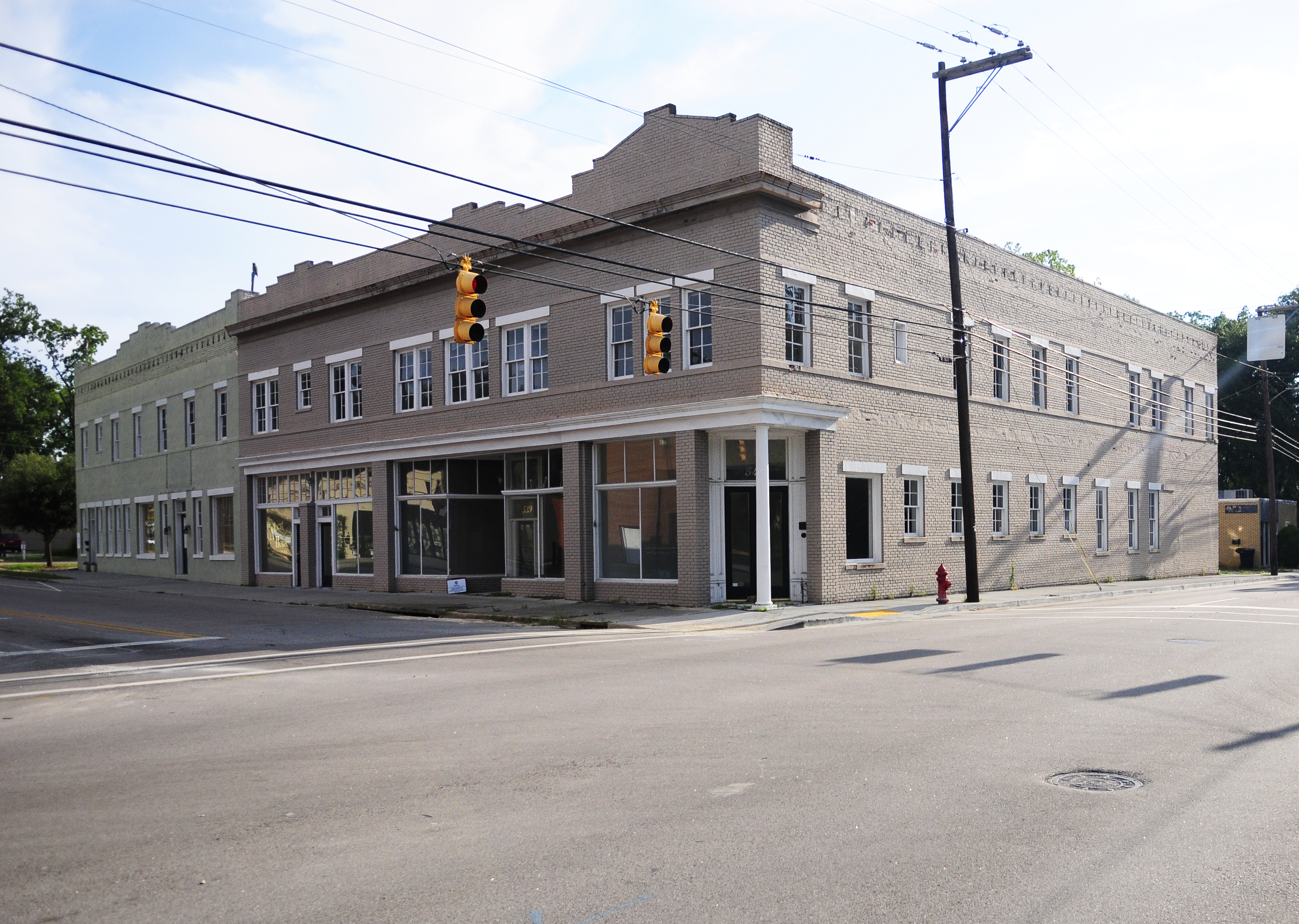
- Hotel Albert Commercial Block, June 2012

- Location within South Carolina Location within the United States
- Location: 529, 539, 545 E. Washington St., Walterboro, South Carolina
- Coordinates: 32°54′18″N 80°39′47″W
- Area: less than one acre
- Built: 1912
- Architect: Clayton, George F.
- Architectural style: Early Commercial
- NRHP reference No.: 99000395
- Added to NRHP: March 25, 1999

Hotel Albert Commercial Block, also known as the Shoppes at the Albert House, is a historic hotel building located at Walterboro, Colleton County, South Carolina. The complex was built in 1912, and consists of four two-story brick structures. It was operated as a hotel until 1960, after which it housed apartments and various commercial enterprises. They buildings were restored in 1995.

It was listed in the National Register of Historic Places in 1999.
