= Ravenwood Plantation =

Historic house in South Carolina, United States

- U.S. National Register of Historic Places
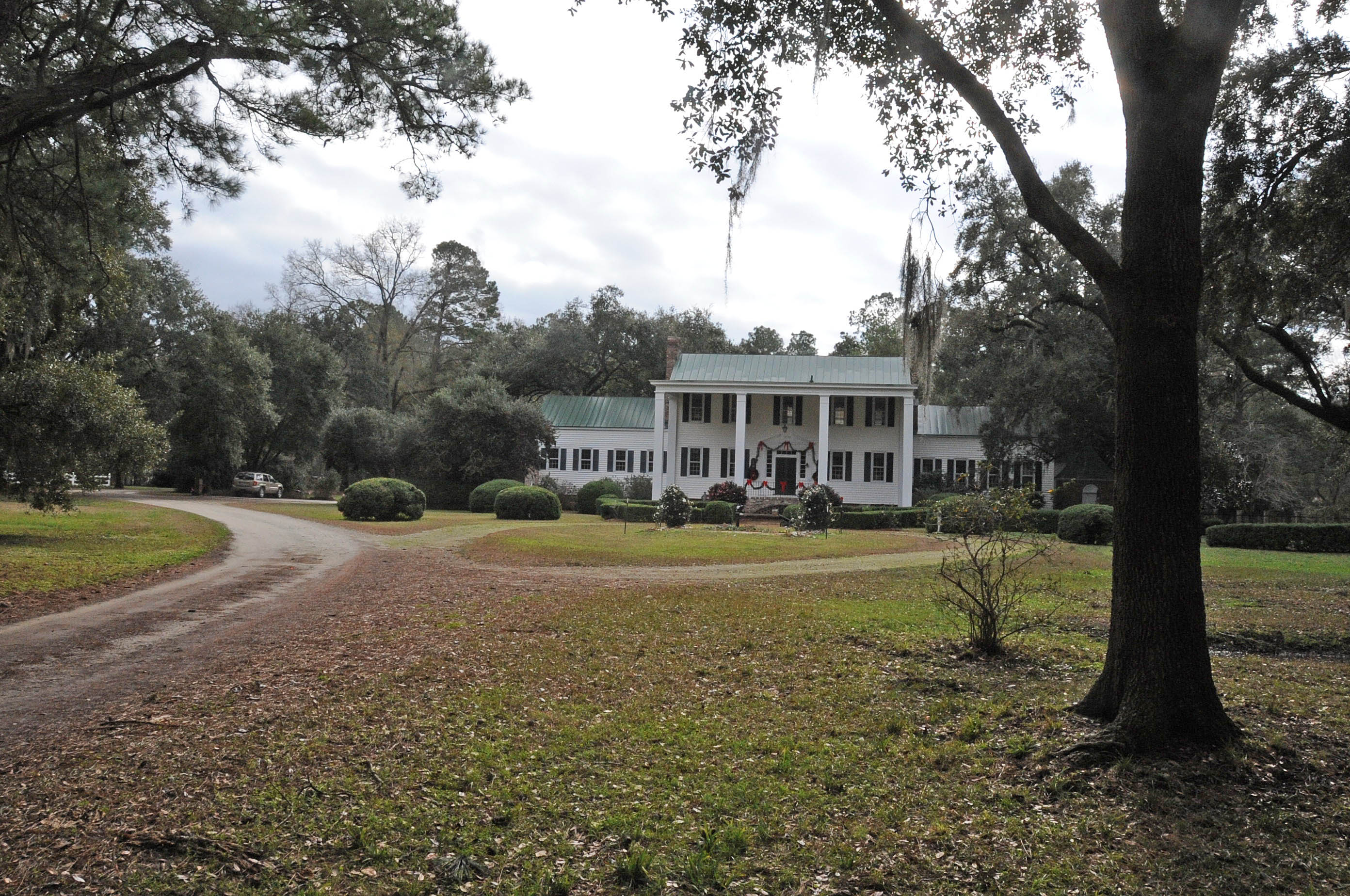

- Location within South Carolina Location within the United States
- Location: South Carolina Highway 64, 0.9 miles east of South Carolina Highway 458, near Neyles, South Carolina
- Coordinates: 32°49′42″N 80°34′41″W
- Area: 325 acres (132 ha)
- Built: 1850
- NRHP reference No.: 97000359
- Added to NRHP: May 1, 1997

Ravenwood Plantation is a historic rice plantation, built in 1850 near Neyles in Colleton County, South Carolina.

It was listed on the National Register of Historic Places in 1997.
