= Walterboro, South Carolina =

- City
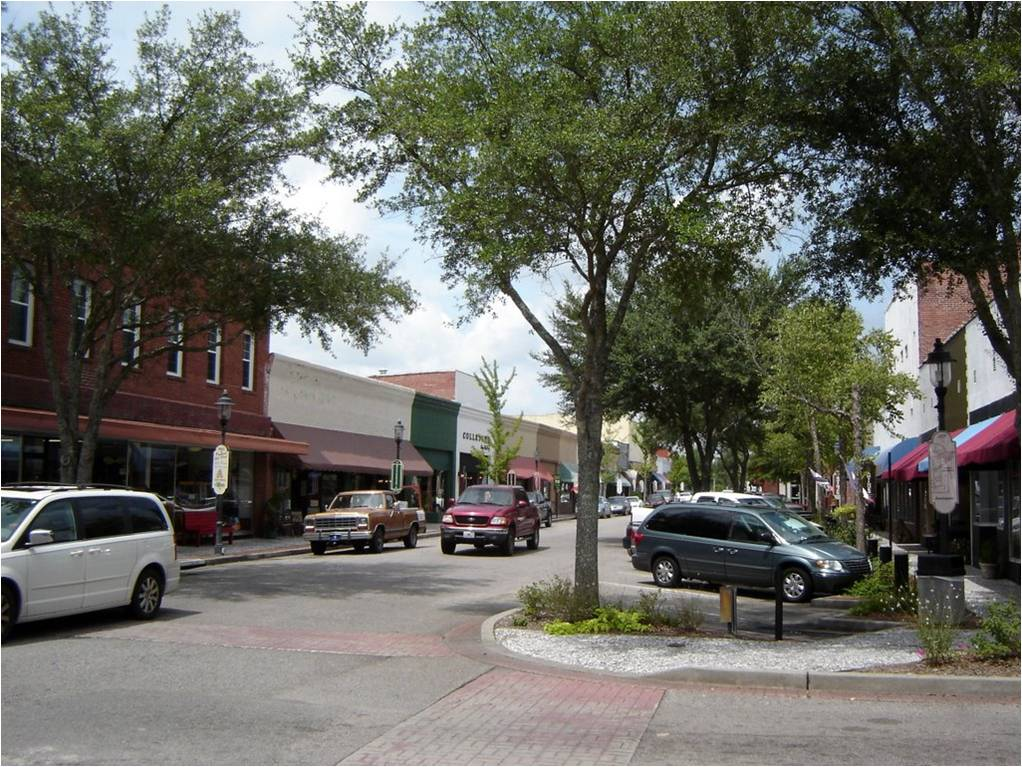
- East Washington Street in downtown Walterboro

- Seal
- Motto: The Front Porch of the Lowcountry
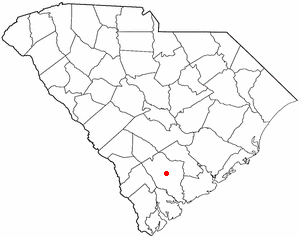
- Location of Walterboro, South Carolina
- Coordinates: 32°53′18″N 80°40′48″W
- Country: United States
- State: South Carolina
- County: Colleton

Area
  - Total: 6.84 sq mi (17.72 km^{2})
  - Land: 6.84 sq mi (17.72 km^{2})
  - Water: 0 sq mi (0.00 km^{2})
- Elevation: 30 ft (9.1 m)

Population (2020)
  - Total: 5,544
  - Density: 810.1/sq mi (312.78/km^{2})
- Time zone: UTC−5 (Eastern (EST))
  - Summer (DST): UTC−4 (EDT)
- ZIP code: 29488
- Area codes: 843, 854
- FIPS code: 45-74275
- GNIS feature ID: 2405667
- Website: www.walterborosc.org

Walterboro is a city in Colleton County, South Carolina, United States. The city's population was 5,544 at the 2020 census. It is the county seat of Colleton County. Walterboro is located 48 miles (77 km) west of Charleston and is located near the ACE Basin region in the South Carolina Lowcountry.

== History ==
Walterboro (original spelling: Walterborough) was founded in 1783, as a summer retreat for local planters looking to escape their malaria-ridden, Lowcountry plantations. The original settlement was located on a hilly area, covered with pine and hickory trees and called Hickory Valley. Two of the earliest settlers were brothers, Paul and Jacob Walter. The brothers were prosperous, plantation owners, in nearby Jacksonboro. Paul's small daughter Mary, was taken ill with malaria; a common disease among the families who had plantations in the marshy areas of the Lowcountry, due to the ground's suitability for rice production. To prevent Mary from succumbing to the deadly disease, the Walter brothers went looking for a healthier location in which to live during the summer months, and came to settle the town; with its later being named in their honor.

In 1817, Walterboro was designated as the third county seat of Colleton County, and has remained such through present-day. This designation was followed by, the construction of a county courthouse and county jail in 1821. The courthouse was designed by well-known architect Robert Mills.

The town quickly spread from the original Hickory Valley location, after its population experienced a significant increase; this being fueled successively by, the town becoming the county seat in 1821, and the establishment of a railroad line that connected the city with Columbia and Charleston in the 1880s.

In 1832, the Irish Catholic community in rural southern Waltersboro (at one point termed Thompson's Crossroads) established a parish called St. James the Greater Catholic Church, dedicated by Bishop John England. The community later was known as Catholic Hill. After the church was burned down in 1856, and the emancipation of the slaves roughly a decade later, the White community largely left the area. The Black Catholic community maintained their religion for decades without a priest, before a new church was built for them in the 1890s. They became notable in the media in the 21st century, and a documentary on the community was released in 2020.

An airfield was established in the 1930s. In 1942, Walterboro became home to the Walterboro Army Airfield, a sub-base of Columbia Army Air Base, and part of the national network of army air training facilities erected across the U.S. during World War II. The base was established for the purpose of providing advanced air-combat training, to fighter and bomber groups. It also hosted the largest camouflage school in the United States, as well as, a 250-person prisoner of war camp.

In 1944, the airfield changed command and became an advanced combat training base for individual fighters, primarily the black trainees graduating from Tuskegee Army Airfield in Tuskegee, Alabama. Over 500 of the famed Tuskegee Airmen trained at Walterboro Army Airfield, between April 1944 and October 1945, including individuals training as replacement pilots for the 332nd Fighter-Interceptor Squadron, along with the entire 447th Bombardment Group. The base closed in October 1945, returning to its origins as a local airfield.

The establishment of Interstate 95 in the 1960s, made the town a prime overnight stop on the road to Florida or New York.

Presently, Walterboro is dotted with historic homes dating back to 1820, and a downtown area that has kept many of its historic buildings. The city has become increasingly known as an antiquing destination, and is a popular day-trip from Charleston and Beaufort.

== Geography ==
Walterboro is geographically located slightly north to the center of Colleton County. Interstate 95 passes west of the city, leading northeast 110 miles (180 km) to Florence, and southwest 67 miles (108 km) to Savannah, Georgia. The southern terminus of U.S. Route 15 is situated in the center of Walterboro; leading northward, running roughly parallel to I-95, reaching St. George in 21 miles (34 km). U.S. Route 17 Alt leads east from US 15, 32 miles (51 km) to Summerville, within the Charleston vicinity, and southwest 21 miles (34 km) to Yemassee. South Carolina Highway 64 leads northwest, past Exit 57 on I-95, 25 miles (40 km) to Ehrhardt, and southeast 16 miles (26 km) to Jacksonboro.

According to the United States Census Bureau, Walterboro has a total area of 6.5 square miles (16.8 km^{2}), consisting solely of landmass.

=== Climate ===
Climate data for Walterboro, South Carolina (1991–2020 normals, extremes 1903–1920 and 1936–present)
Month	Jan	Feb	Mar	Apr	May	Jun	Jul	Aug	Sep	Oct	Nov	Dec	Year
Record high °F (°C)	85 (29)	88 (31)	98 (37)	95 (35)	103 (39)	106 (41)	106 (41)	107 (42)	105 (41)	100 (38)	91 (33)	85 (29)	107 (42)
Mean maximum °F (°C)	75.3 (24.1)	78.0 (25.6)	83.9 (28.8)	87.6 (30.9)	93.0 (33.9)	96.7 (35.9)	98.2 (36.8)	97.0 (36.1)	93.2 (34.0)	87.5 (30.8)	81.8 (27.7)	76.7 (24.8)	99.3 (37.4)
Mean daily maximum °F (°C)	58.1 (14.5)	62.0 (16.7)	68.7 (20.4)	76.1 (24.5)	82.8 (28.2)	87.4 (30.8)	90.5 (32.5)	88.9 (31.6)	84.2 (29.0)	76.4 (24.7)	67.7 (19.8)	61.1 (16.2)	75.3 (24.1)
Daily mean °F (°C)	46.7 (8.2)	49.8 (9.9)	56.5 (13.6)	63.3 (17.4)	71.2 (21.8)	77.5 (25.3)	80.8 (27.1)	79.5 (26.4)	74.6 (23.7)	64.7 (18.2)	55.0 (12.8)	49.5 (9.7)	64.1 (17.8)
Mean daily minimum °F (°C)	35.2 (1.8)	37.6 (3.1)	44.2 (6.8)	50.4 (10.2)	59.6 (15.3)	67.6 (19.8)	71.1 (21.7)	70.1 (21.2)	65.0 (18.3)	53.1 (11.7)	42.3 (5.7)	37.9 (3.3)	52.8 (11.6)
Mean minimum °F (°C)	20.8 (−6.2)	24.3 (−4.3)	28.5 (−1.9)	35.9 (2.2)	46.6 (8.1)	59.2 (15.1)	64.9 (18.3)	64.2 (17.9)	54.0 (12.2)	38.2 (3.4)	28.3 (−2.1)	24.5 (−4.2)	19.2 (−7.1)
Record low °F (°C)	0 (−18)	9 (−13)	15 (−9)	26 (−3)	31 (−1)	44 (7)	54 (12)	55 (13)	37 (3)	24 (−4)	11 (−12)	5 (−15)	0 (−18)
Average precipitation inches (mm)	4.01 (102)	3.74 (95)	3.50 (89)	3.56 (90)	3.59 (91)	5.63 (143)	5.21 (132)	7.17 (182)	4.60 (117)	3.68 (93)	3.08 (78)	3.65 (93)	51.42 (1,306)
Average precipitation days	8.4	7.9	8.0	6.9	7.0	10.1	10.5	11.8	8.1	6.1	6.2	7.9	98.9
Source: NOAA

== Demographics ==
Historical population
Census	Pop.	Note	%±
1870	636		—
1880	691		8.6%
1890	1,171		69.5%
1900	1,491		27.3%
1910	1,677		12.5%
1920	1,853		10.5%
1930	2,592		39.9%
1940	3,373		30.1%
1950	4,616		36.9%
1960	5,417		17.4%
1970	6,257		15.5%
1980	6,209		−0.8%
1990	5,492		−11.5%
2000	5,153		−6.2%
2010	5,398		4.8%
2020	5,544		2.7%
U.S. Decennial Census

=== 2020 census ===
As of the 2020 census, Walterboro had a population of 5,544 and a median age of 41.1 years. Residents under the age of 18 comprised 23.2% of the population, while 21.2% were 65 years of age or older. For every 100 females there were 81.1 males, and for every 100 females age 18 and over there were 77.7 males age 18 and over.

94.1% of residents lived in urban areas, while 5.9% lived in rural areas.

There were 2,377 households in Walterboro, of which 28.1% had children under the age of 18 living in them. Of all households, 29.5% were married-couple households, 19.8% were households with a male householder and no spouse or partner present, and 44.7% were households with a female householder and no spouse or partner present. About 36.3% of all households were made up of individuals and 16.8% had someone living alone who was 65 years of age or older.

There were 2,689 housing units, of which 11.6% were vacant. The homeowner vacancy rate was 3.3% and the rental vacancy rate was 5.8%.

Racial composition as of the 2020 census
Race	Number	Percent
White	2,393	43.2%
Black or African American	2,687	48.5%
American Indian and Alaska Native	20	0.4%
Asian	97	1.7%
Native Hawaiian and Other Pacific Islander	1	0.0%
Some other race	109	2.0%
Two or more races	237	4.3%
Hispanic or Latino (of any race)	211	3.8%

=== 2010 census ===
As of the 2010 U.S. census, there were 5,401 people living in the city. The population density was 832.0 inhabitants per square mile (321.2/km^{2}). There were 2,571 housing units, at an average density of 475.8 per square mile (183.7/km^{2}). The racial makeup of the city was: 44.1% Non-Hispanic White, 50.5% African American, 0.3% Native American, 1.0% Asian, 0.0% Pacific Islander, and 1.5% from two or more races. Hispanic or Latino, of any race, constituted 2.9% of the population.

There were 2,231 households, out of which 28.2% had children under the age of 18 years living with them, 39.0% were married couples living together, 23.5% had a female householder with no husband present, and 33.8% were non-families. 30.4% of all households were made up of individuals, and 14.9% had someone living alone who was 65 years of age or older. The average household size was 2.32 and the average family size was 2.90.

In the city, the population was spread out, with 25.8% under the age of 18, 7.5% from 18 to 24, 24.6% from 25 to 44, 23.0% from 45 to 64, and 17.9% who were 65 years of age or older. The median age was 39 years. For every 100 females, there were 79.7 males. For every 100 females age 18 and over, there were 73.1 males.

The median income for a household in the city was $24,135, and the median income for a family was $32,549. Males had a median income of $27,488 versus $20,351 for females. The per capita income for the city was $20,223. About 20.6% of families and 30.1% of the population were below the poverty line, including 37.1% of those under age 18 and 10.4% of those age 65 or over.

=== Ethnicity ===
As of 2016 the largest self-reported ancestries/ethnicities in Walterboro, South Carolina were:

Largest ancestries (2016)	Percent
English	9.8%
American	6.7%
German	5.8%
Scots-Irish	4.1%
French	3.2%
Italian	0.6%
Welsh	0.3%

== Education ==
Walterboro is in the Colleton County School District.

Walterboro has several public and private schools in its surrounding area. There are five public elementary schools (Bells Elementary, Cottageville Elementary, Hendersonville Elementary, Forest Hills Elementary, and Northside Elementary, one public middle school (Colleton County Middle School), and one public high school (Colleton County High School). There are two private K-12 schools: Colleton Preparatory Academy and North Walterboro Christian Academy. The University of South Carolina Salkehatchie is the city's local university and Clemson University has a county extension office in the city.

Walterboro has a public library branch of the Colleton County Library System.

== Notable people ==
- William Jones Boone, bishop
- Bonnie Lynn Fields, actress
- Nick Grant, rapper
- Norman Hand, American football player
- George B. Hartzog Jr., NPS Director
- Craig Mack, rapper
- Peden McLeod, attorney and politician
- Dean Meminger, basketball player and coach
- Kamiyah Mobley, kidnapping victim
- John Peurifoy, diplomat
- Young Scooter, rapper
- Mary Shaffer, artist
- Marvin Herman Shoob, judge
- Brother Stair, minister and evangelicalist
- Darwin Walker, American football player
- Alexander F. Warley, Confederate States Navy officer
- Bill Workman, politician

== Infrastructure ==
Walterboro is accessible from Interstate 95 (access at exits 53 and 57), where lodging, dining, and gas station facilities make it a popular stopping point for travelers. Other roads of importance include U.S. Highway 15, Alternate U.S. Highway 17, and several state highways. The Lowcountry Regional Airport provides general aviation services to Walterboro and Colleton County.

== See also ==
- Old Colleton County Jail
