= Sea Islands =

Chain of barrier islands along the coast of South Carolina, Georgia and Florida

- Map of the Sea islands

- Location within the United States

Geography
- Location: Atlantic Ocean
- Total islands: Over 100

Administration
- United States

The Sea Islands are a chain of over one hundred tidal and barrier islands on the Atlantic Ocean coast of the Southeastern United States in the states of South Carolina, Georgia and Florida, roughly between the mouths of the Santee and Nassau rivers. The islands are part of the historical area of the Gullah Geechee people and the Gullah-Geechee Cultural Heritage Corridor. All of the islands are acutely threatened by sea level rise due to climate change.

== History ==
Settled by indigenous cultures thousands of years ago, the islands were selected by Spanish colonists as sites for founding of colonial missions. Historically the Spanish influenced the Guale and Mocama chiefdoms by establishing Christian missions in their major settlements, from St. Catherine's Island south, past the Sea Islands, to Fort George Island (at present-day Jacksonville, Florida).

Both chiefdoms extended to the coastal areas on the mainland. The Mocama Province included territory to the St. Johns River in present-day Florida. The mission system ended under pressure of repeated raids by English South Carolina colonists and Indian allies. Spain ceded its territory of Florida to Great Britain in 1763.

After 18th-century European-American settlement of Georgia and Florida, planters purchased and enslaved Africans for labor. Many were used to work the labor-intensive cotton, rice, and indigo plantations on the Sea Islands, which generated much of the wealth of the colony and state. The Sea Islands were known historically for the production of Sea Island cotton. The enslaved workers developed the notable and distinct Gullah culture and language which has survived to contemporary times.

During the American Civil War, the Union Navy and the Union Army soon occupied the islands. The white planter families had fled to other locations on the mainland, sometimes leaving behind their slaves. The slaves largely ran their own lives during this period, supported by Northern missionaries and abolitionists in the Port Royal Experiment. They had already created cohesive communities, because planter families often stayed on the mainland to avoid malaria and the isolation of the islands. Large numbers of slaves worked on the rice and indigo plantations, and had limited interaction with whites, which enabled them to develop their own distinct culture. During the war, the Union Army managed the plantations and assigned plots of land to slaves for farming.

After President Abraham Lincoln's Emancipation Proclamation became effective on January 1, 1863, more than 5,000 slaves on Union-occupied islands obtained their freedom. After the war, although the freedmen hoped to be given land as compensation for having worked it for so many years in slavery, the federal government generally returned properties to the planters returning from their refuges or exile. Many of the freedmen stayed in the area, working on their former plantations as sharecroppers, tenant farmers or laborers as the system changed to free labor.

The area was home to multiple plantations; in 1863 Fanny Kemble published Journal of a Residence on a Georgian Plantation in 1838–1839 about her experience on her husband's plantations in St. Simon's Island and Butler Island.

In 1893, a deadly major hurricane struck the Sea Islands.

== List ==
=== South Carolina ===
==== Charleston County ====
- Bird Key Island
- Bull Island
- Capers Island
- Coles Island
- Dewees Island
- Edisto Island (also in Colleton County)
- Folly Island
- Isle of Palms
- James Island
- Johns Island
- Kiawah Island
- Morris Island
- Seabrook Island
- Sol Legare Island
- Sullivan's Island
- Wadmalaw Island
- Yonges Island

==== Colleton County ====
- Bear Island

==== Beaufort County ====
- Bay Point Island
- Cane Island
- Cat Island
- Coosaw Island
- Dataw Island
- Daufuskie Island
- Distant Island
- Fripp Island
- Gibbes Island
- Harbor Island
- Hilton Head Island
- Horse Island
- Hunting Island
- Lady's Island
- Morgan Island
- Parris Island
- Port Royal Island
- Pritchard's Island
- St. Helena Island
- St. Phillips Island
- Spring Island

=== Georgia ===
==== Chatham County ====
- Tybee Island
- Little Tybee Island
- Cockspur Island
- Wilmington Island
- Talahi Island
- Whitemarsh Island
- Oatland Island
- Skidaway Island
- Isle of Hope
- Williamson Island
- Dutch Island
- Burnside Island
- Wassaw Island
- Ossabaw Island

==== Liberty County ====
- St. Catherine's Island
- Isle of Wight
- Hampton Island

==== McIntosh County ====
- Blackbeard Island
- Sapelo Island

==== Glynn County ====
- Jekyll Island
- Little St. Simons Island
- St. Simons Island
- Sea Island

==== Camden County ====
- Cumberland Island

=== Florida ===
==== Nassau County ====
- Amelia Island

== See also ==
- Sea Island Creole English (Gullah)
- Sea Island cotton
- Carolina Gold rice
- Sea Island red peas
