= Rockville Historic District =

Rockville Historic District may refer to:

- Rockville Historic District (Rockville, Connecticut), listed on the NRHP in Connecticut
- Rockville Historic District (Rockville, Indiana), listed on the NRHP in Indiana
- Rockville Historic District (Rockville, South Carolina), listed on the NRHP in South Carolina
