= Rockville, South Carolina =

- Town
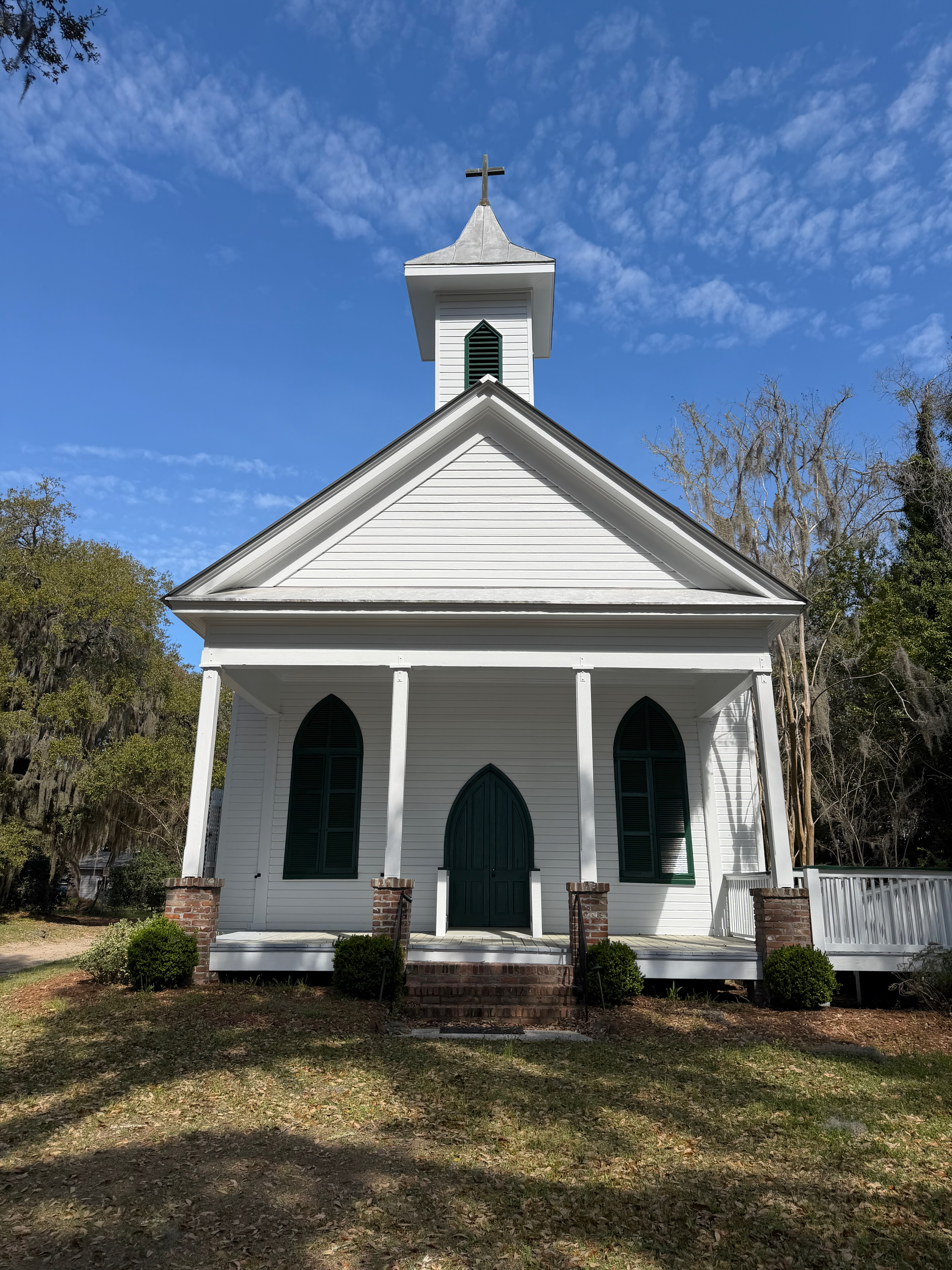
- Grace Chapel, part of Rockville Historic District

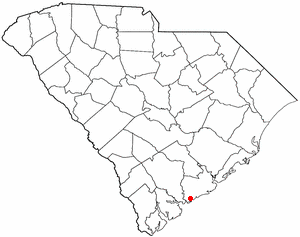
- Location of Rockville in South Carolina
- Coordinates: 32°36′09″N 80°11′37″W
- Country: United States
- State: South Carolina
- County: Charleston
- Incorporated: 1784

Area
  - Total: 0.51 sq mi (1.33 km^{2})
  - Land: 0.42 sq mi (1.10 km^{2})
  - Water: 0.089 sq mi (0.23 km^{2})
- Elevation: 3 ft (0.91 m)

Population (2020)
  - Total: 141
  - Density: 333/sq mi (128.5/km^{2})
- Time zone: UTC-5 (EST)
  - Summer (DST): UTC-4 (EDT)
- FIPS code: 45-61495
- GNIS feature ID: 2407231
- Website: townofrockville.com

Rockville is a town in Charleston County, South Carolina, United States, that was founded in 1784. As of the 2020 census, Rockville had a population of 141. It is part of the Charleston-North Charleston-Summerville metropolitan area. The town is the site of the Rockville Regatta, an annual sailing event dating to 1890.

== History ==
The Hanckel Mound, Horse Island, Rockville Historic District, and John Seabrook Plantation Bridge are listed on the National Register of Historic Places.

Rockville developed in the nineteenth century as a summer retreat for Lowcountry planters, and sailing was the predominant recreational activity from its earliest years.

== Geography ==
Rockville is located on Wadmalaw Island in southwestern Charleston County at the start of South Carolina Highway 700, on the north bank of tidal Bohicket Creek, an arm of the North Edisto River. To the south across Bohicket Creek is the town of Seabrook Island. SC Highway 700 leads northeast 11 miles (18 km) to Johns Island and 22 miles (35 km) to Charleston.

According to the United States Census Bureau, the town has a total area of 0.50 square miles (1.3 km^{2}), of which 0.42 square miles (1.1 km^{2}) is land and 0.1 square miles (0.2 km^{2}), or 17.52%, is water.

== Demographics ==
Historical population
Census	Pop.	Note	%±
2000	137		—
2010	134		−2.2%
2020	141		5.2%
U.S. Decennial Census

=== 2020 census ===
Rockville racial composition
Race	Num.	Perc.
White (non-Hispanic)	125	88.65%
Black or African American (non-Hispanic)	11	7.8%
Other/Mixed	2	1.42%
Hispanic or Latino	3	2.13%

As of the 2020 United States census, there were 141 people, 66 households, and 36 families residing in the town.

=== 2000 census ===
As of the census of 2000, there were 137 people, 64 households, and 44 families residing in the town. The population density was 314.7 inhabitants per square mile (121.5 inhabitants per km²). There were 84 housing units at an average density of 193.0 housing units per square mile (74.5/km²). The racial makeup of the town was 86.86% White, 11.68% African American, 1.46% from other races. Hispanic or Latino of any race were 2.19% of the population.

There were 64 households, out of which 10.9% had children under the age of 18 living with them, 62.5% were married couples living together, 6.3% had a female householder with no husband present, and 29.7% were non-families. 28.1% of all households were made up of individuals, and 10.9% had someone living alone who was 65 years of age or older. The average household size was 2.14 and the average family size was 2.60.

In the town, the population was spread out, with 10.9% under the age of 18, 8.8% from 18 to 24, 16.1% from 25 to 44, 41.6% from 45 to 64, and 22.6% who were 65 years of age or older. The median age was 52 years. For every 100 females, there were 107.6 males. For every 100 females aged 18 and over, there were 100.0 males.

The median income for a household in the town was $58,977, and the median income for a family was $69,821. Males had a median income of $45,208 versus $33,750 for females. The per capita income for the town was $36,620. There were 3.9% of families and 3.1% of the population living below the poverty line, including no under eighteens and none of those over 64.

== Rockville Regatta ==
The Rockville Regatta is an annual sailing regatta hosted by the Sea Island Yacht Club in Rockville. The event dates to 1890 and has been described as the oldest continuously held regatta in North America; it was suspended in 2020 during the COVID-19 pandemic.

Plans to form the Sea Island Yacht Club advanced in the same year as the first regatta, and the two have been associated ever since. According to local accounts, the 1890 race originated in a challenge between cousins Isaac Jenkins Mikell and John F. Sosnowski, sailing the Mermaid and the Undine respectively.

Racing is led by the locally designed Sea Island One Design class, with additional one-design classes also competing. The regatta serves as the final event of the South Atlantic Yacht Racing Association's Lowcountry summer series, with the Ellis Cup awarded to the best cumulative scorer across the five series races and the Oliver F. Seabrook award to the winner of the Sea Island One Design race. A shrimp boil at the yacht club precedes the racing, a spectator fleet anchors in Bohicket Creek to watch, and the event draws several thousand spectators. The 137th regatta was scheduled for August 1–2, 2026.

== Government ==
The city is run by an elected mayor–council government system.
