= Cole Island, South Carolina =

Barrier island in South Carolina, USA

Coordinates: 32°38′29″N 79°59′37″W

Cole Island is a barrier island with a 303-acre footprint in Charleston County, South Carolina, located southwest of Charleston on the Stono Inlet, between Folly Island and Kiawah Island. Cole Island and its surrounding wetlands are part of the Lowcountry's salt-marsh ecosystem.

Historically, Cole Island was also referred to as Coles Island and Cole's Island. The island's historical significance derives from its strategic location. Cole Island was used to defend against maritime access from the Atlantic Ocean through the Stono Inlet during the War of 1812 and the American Civil War in an effort to protect Charleston.

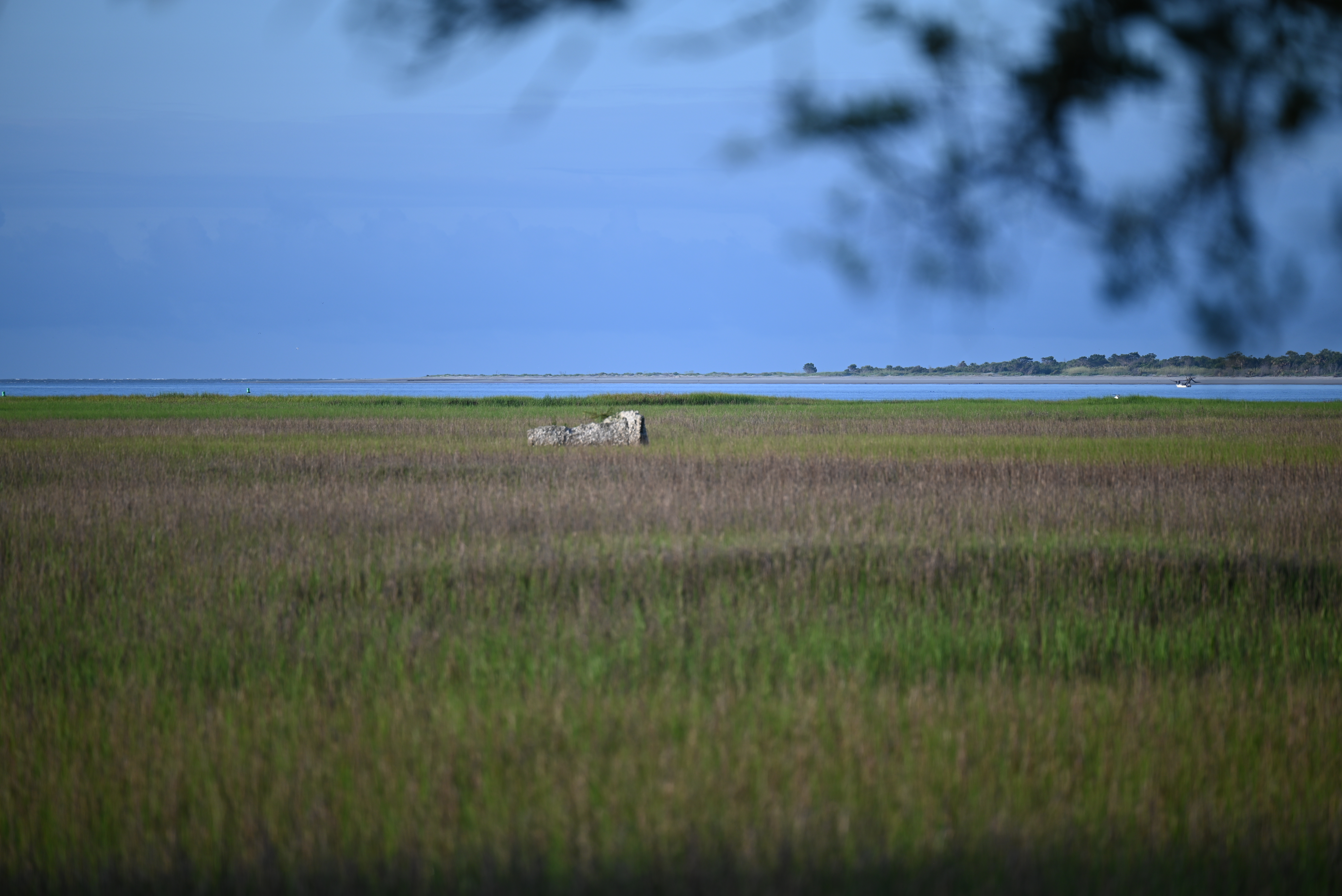
Fort Palmetto's remains on Cole Island, South Carolina

During the War of 1812, Fort Palmetto was constructed on Cole Island as a defensive fortress to defend Charleston against a British attack from its southwestern waterways. During the American Civil War, Cole Island was utilized again during a time of war by both the Confederate States of America and Union forces. During the Confederates' occupation, nine defensive batteries were constructed on Cole Island in an effort to defend the Stono Inlet from entry by the Union Navy. After the Confederates' abandonment in May 1862, the Union would occupy Cole Island and utilize it for attacks on Charleston and nearby barrier islands.

A hurricane in 1911 destroyed many of the structures on Cole Island, including Fort Palmetto. The remains of Fort Palmetto are now partially submerged in Cole Island's foremarsh, and are protected by the South Carolina Battleground Preservation Trust.

== Geography ==
Cole Island is located southwest of Charleston, South Carolina, in the United States. The island sits near the mouth of the Atlantic Ocean at the Stono Inlet, where the ocean meets the Stono and Folly Rivers. The island lies between Folly Island and Kiawah Island, and near Bird Key Sanctuary.

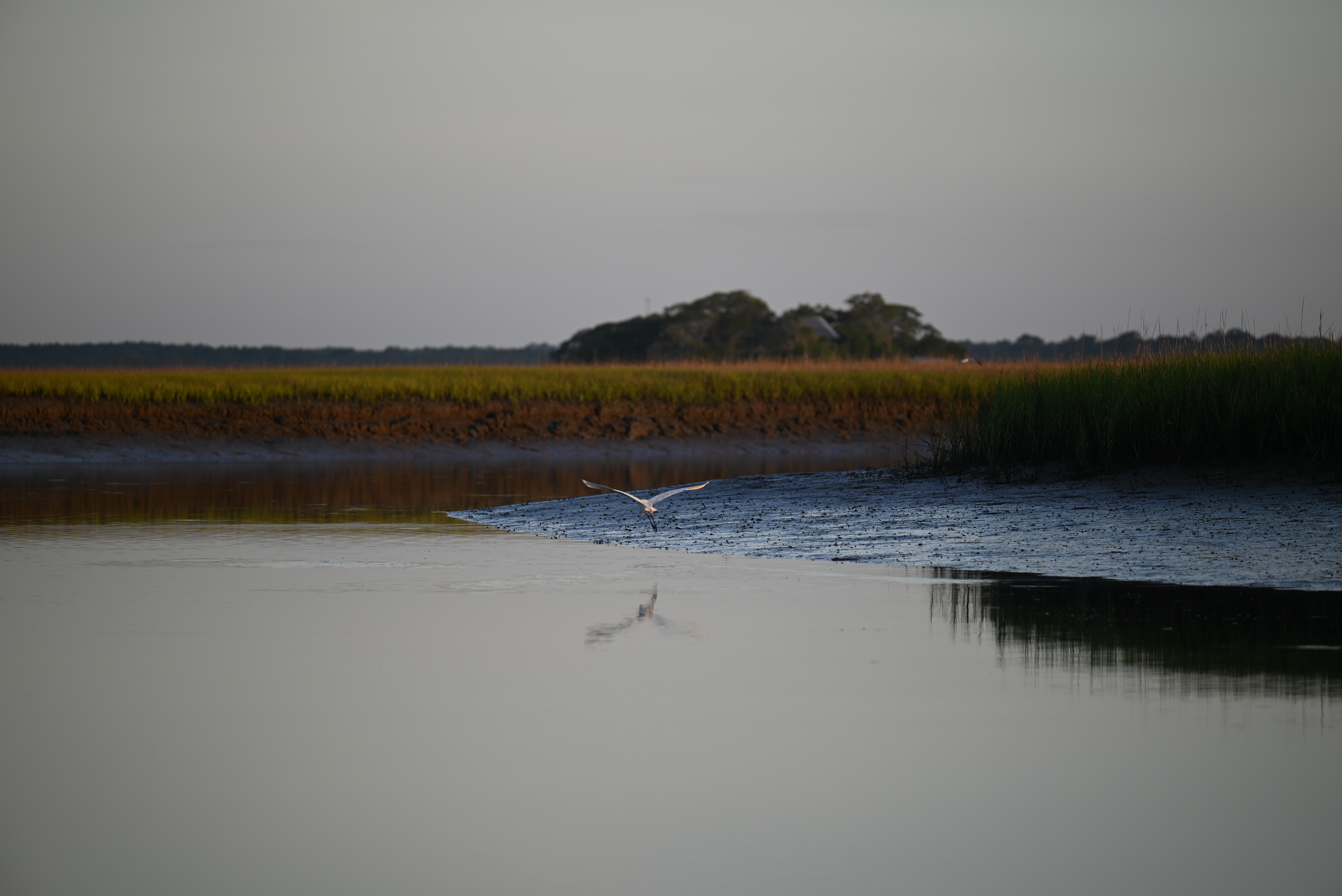
Cole Creek at Cole Island, South Carolina

The surrounding estuary is part of the ACE Basin and the South Carolina Lowcountry salt-marsh ecosystem, supporting marine and coastal wildlife. The island’s vegetation includes mature live oaks, palmettos, and pines, providing habitat for the island's native species.

Cole Creek, also known as ‘Mom’ Sally Creek, is a deep tidal creek on the eastern side of Cole Island that is vital to the island’s ecosystem, supporting both marine and coastal wildlife. Cole Creek is a known location where bottlenose dolphins engage in strand feeding, a learned hunting technique in which dolphins intentionally beach themselves on marsh banks to capture fish. This rare behavior is known to occur in only a few locations worldwide and is frequently observed in the shallow waters of the Lowcountry, including Cole Creek.

== Fort Palmetto ==
The British siege of Charleston during the American Revolutionary War exposed the city’s vulnerability through its southwestern waterways, including the Stono Inlet, located between Folly Island and Kiawah Island. In response, Fort Palmetto was constructed on Cole Island during the War of 1812 to prevent a recurrence.

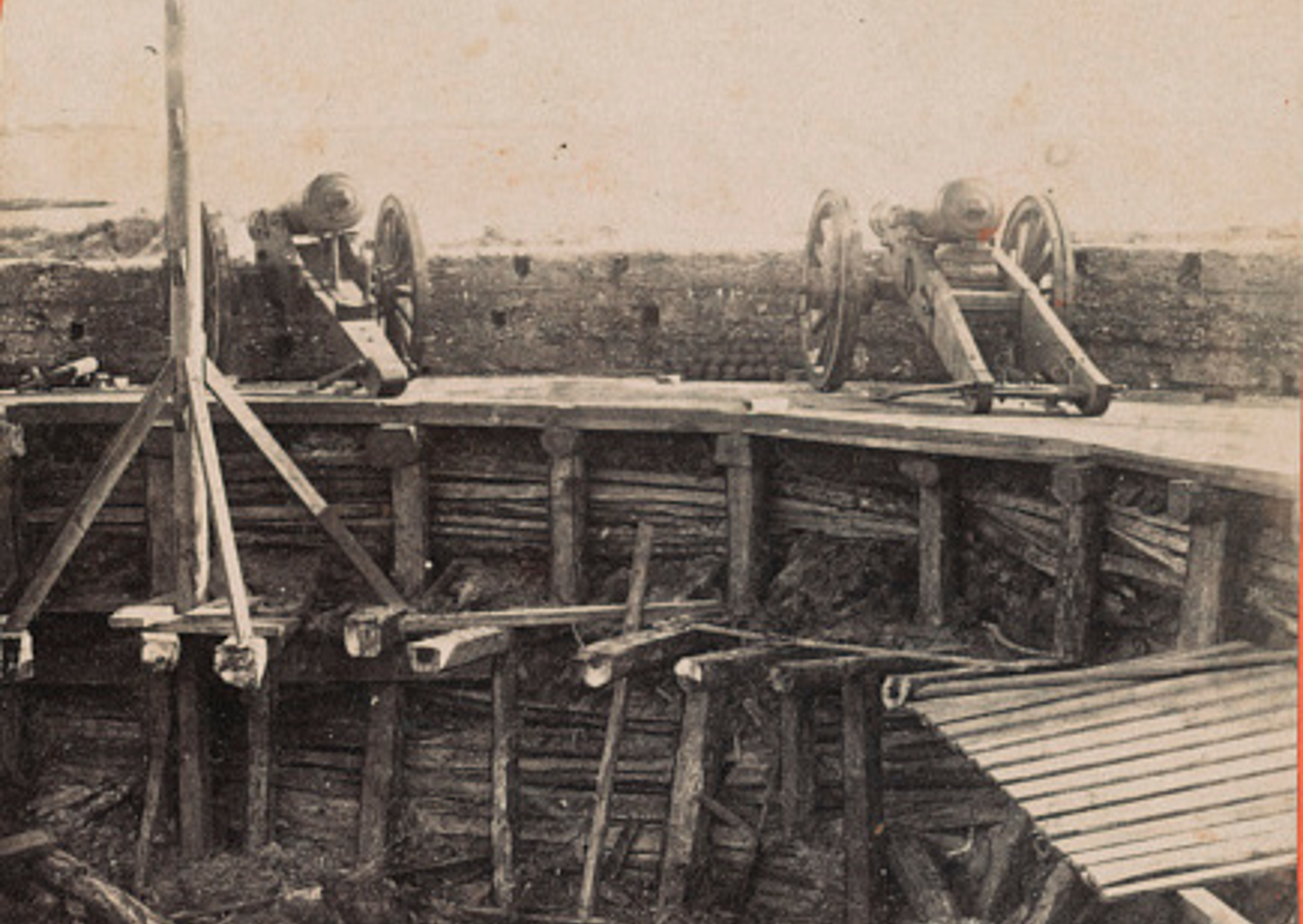
Confederate States Army's artillery and fortification on Cole Island, South Carolina during the American Civil War

Fort Palmetto was a circular fortification built out of tabby concrete and believed to have been constructed during the War of 1812 as part of Charleston’s coastal defense. Early in the American Civil War, the Confederate States of America occupied Cole Island and constructed armed batteries 1 through 9 along its perimeter. Batteries 1-3 were located on what is now known as Snake Island. At that time, the batteries on Cole Island guarded the Stono Inlet, and provided a defense against Union Navy gunboats entering from the Atlantic Ocean and attacking the posts along the Stono and Folly Rivers. Fort Palmetto was designated as Battery 7.

In January 1862, Union Navy Lieutenant George Balch, Commander of U.S.S. Pocahontas, described Fort Palmetto as being "an ancient fortification" surrounded by a ditch 3 ft (0.91 m) deep that fills with the tide. Balch also reported that the fort was manned by 35 Confederates, and armed with two 24-pounder rifled guns and two 24-pounder smoothbore guns.

The hurricane of 1911 destroyed many of the structures on Cole Island, including Fort Palmetto, leaving only remnants of the circular fort’s tabby walls in the marsh. Fort Palmetto's remains are protected by the South Carolina Battleground Preservation Trust.

== History ==
=== American Civil War ===
During the American Civil War, Cole Island provided support for Confederate and Union operations around Charleston, South Carolina. The island’s location at the Stono Inlet, which connects the Atlantic Ocean to the Stono and Folly Rivers, enabled control of maritime access to Charleston’s southwestern approaches by water and land. The occupation of Cole Island meant control over the Stono and Folly Rivers, the “back gate” entry to Charleston, in contrast to Charleston Harbor, the city’s primary maritime entrance and location of Fort Sumter.

=== Confederate Occupation ===
The Confederate States Army would occupy Cole Island after it attacked Fort Sumter in Charleston Harbor, marking the beginning of the American Civil War on April 12, 1861. Confederate Brigadier General Roswell S. Ripley assigned Colonel Johnson Hagood of the First South Carolina Volunteer Regiment to command the post on Cole Island, South Carolina, on August 28, 1861, to defend the Stono Inlet against entry by Union gunboats. Under Colonel Hagood’s command, Cole Island was developed into a military training camp and fortified post. Facilities constructed on the island included barracks for up to 1,000 men, bombproof batteries, commissary and quartermaster buildings, bake houses, and a hospital.

Following the Union victory at the Battle of Port Royal on November 7, 1861, Confederate forces withdrew from seacoast positions south of Cole Island, making Cole Island the new frontline of defense along South Carolina's southern coast. The Union Navy also posed an ongoing threat for an attack on Charleston by positioning a blockade in the Atlantic Ocean along Charleston's shoreline.

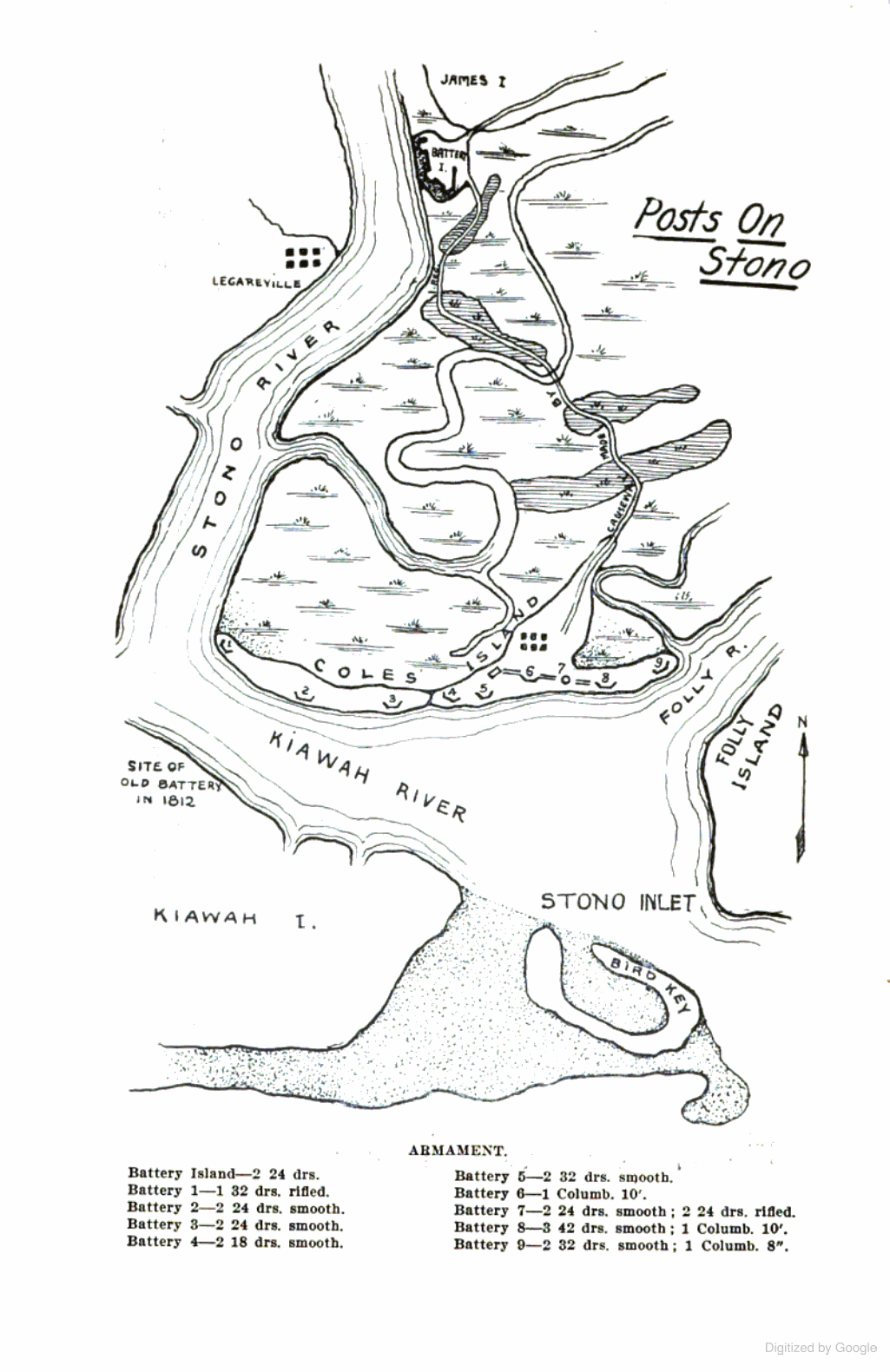
American Civil War Posts on Stono River from Johnson Hagood's Memoirs of the War of Secession

In anticipation of Union advances, Colonel Hagood secured authorization from Brigadier General Ripley to construct a series of defensive batteries along Cole Island, facing the Folly and Stono Rivers. Confederate engineer Major James H. Trapier oversaw the establishment of nine batteries, equipped with bomb-proof shelters. Batteries 1–3 were situated on what is now known as Snake Island, then considered part of Cole Island’s southwestern end. Fort Palmetto, constructed during the War of 1812, was designated Battery 7.

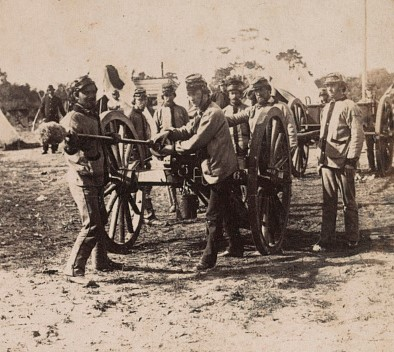
Confederate States Army's Lafayette Artillery cleaning a gun on one of the batteries on Cole Island, South Carolina during the American Civil War

During the winter of 1861-1862, Cole Island became a topic of a political debate within the Confederacy. Robert E. Lee, at that time had been appointed to oversee the fortifications on the southeastern coast. Lee visited Cole Island and inspected its batteries. Lee's assessment was that the island's earthwork batteries would not withstand an assault by Union gunboats, which could result in the loss of both artillery and soldiers, and that the post should be abandoned. In contrast, General Ripley and Colonel Hagood advocated for further strengthening Cole Island into a self-sustaining fortress to block Union naval passage through the Stono Inlet. General Ripley's request for additional artillery and ammunition was denied.

Under Union pressure of an attack, Confederate Major-General Pemberton issued the final order to Brigadier-General Ripley to abandon Cole Island on May 6, 1862, and relocate the island's defenses closer inland to defend Charleston. It took Colonel Stevens a week to dismantle 17 guns on Cole Island. On May 12, 1862, the Confederate Steam Ship (C.S.S) Planter, crewed by enslaved men including Robert Smalls, was used to remove the remaining artillery, officially disarming and abandoning Cole Island.

=== Robert Smalls's Escape ===
On the night of May 12, 1862, the C.S.S. Planter was moored in Charleston Harbor, loaded with cargo that included artillery removed from Cole Island: a banded 42-pounder rifled cannon, an 8-inch Columbiad, an 8-inch seacoast howitzer, a 32-pounder cannon, and a gun carriage. While the Planter’s captain, Charles Relyea, and officers were ashore, Robert Smalls, an enslaved crewman, seized the opportunity to escape. Smalls successfully piloted the Planter through Charleston Harbor and past Confederate checkpoints undetected. Smalls delivered his family, the ship's enslaved crew, and the C.S.S. Planter, along with its cargo, to the Union Navy in the early morning hours on May 13, 1862.

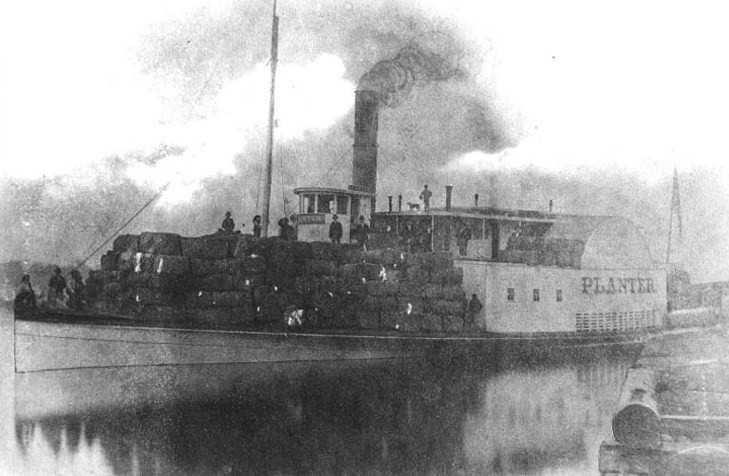
NH 74054 Steamer Planter

On May 14th, following the confirmed report of the Planter’s crewman’s escape, Colonel Stevens and the remaining 24th South Carolina Regiment were ordered to withdraw from Cole Island. Confederate forces would never again occupy Cole Island.

=== Union Occupation ===
In addition to delivering valuable cargo to the Union Navy, Robert Smalls provided intelligence indicating that Cole Island had been abandoned by Confederate forces and the Stono Inlet was unguarded. On May 20, 1862, Union forces bombarded Cole Island, destroying Confederate structures and confirming its abandonment. Subsequently, the Union occupied the island, and its gunboats secured control over the Stono Inlet. While Confederate leadership believed the abandonment of Cole Island was justified, they underestimated the strategic advantage it provided the Union.

Union attacks on Charleston and along the Stono and Folly Rivers often utilized Cole Island as a staging area and a camp for the Union soldiers. The Union's camp included tents, a cookhouse, a bakehouse, and a chapel. Even when troops were not occupying the island, Union gunboats maintained a presence at the Stono Inlet, ensuring continued control over the waterways until the end of the war in 1865.

The Union's advancement on Morris Island's Fort Wagner on July 18, 1863, would be one such attack in which the Union utilized Cole Island. On the day before the Union's attack on Fort Wagner, hundreds of Union Soldiers would be waiting on Cole Island to go into battle. One of the regiments included the 54th Massachusetts Infantry. After 5:00 a.m. on July 17, 1863, the 54th Massachusetts arrived on Cole Island having marched four miles through stormy conditions over swamps and marshes to get there. At 4:00 p.m. that afternoon, soldiers were waiting on the shore of Cole Island to be transported to Morris Island for the Union’s attack on Fort Wagner. The Union soldiers would reach the island from James Island via a "treacherous causeway" previously built by the Confederates to cross the marsh to Cole Island. That afternoon, Colonel Robert G. Shaw of the 54th Massachusetts Infantry Regiment sat on the shore of Cole Island and wrote his last letter to his wife. Shaw would be killed the following day, along with many other Union soldiers, in the battle at Fort Wagner.

=== Confederate order to abandon ===
The disarmament of Cole Island, without increased reinforcement at nearby positions on the Stono and Folly Rivers, was a controversial move made by the Confederates. Major-General John C. Pemberton, in command of the Confederate Department of South Carolina and Georgia, issued the final order to abandon and disarm Cole Island to Brigadier General Roswell S. Ripley on May 6, 1862. Ripley disagreed, but followed orders. This would be a point of contention between Major-General Pemberton and Brigadier-General Ripley. Ripley was relieved of his command on May 26, 1862, after his popularity declined when Robert Smalls escaped under his watch with the C.S.S. Planter and artillery from Cole Island.

Reoccupation of Cole Island became an obsession for South Carolina Governor Francis Wilkinson Pickens, but proved impossible. Confederate leadership repeatedly ordered Pemberton to reclaim the island, but he was unable to do so. To maintain their strategic advantage, Union gunboats continuously patrolled the rivers around the Stono Inlet, preventing Confederate reoccupation and reinforcing Union operations against Charleston.

Confederate General Pemberton defended his order to withdraw from Cole Island by claiming the Confederacy's War Department in Richmond repeatedly denied his requests for additional artillery. Anticipating the Union's attack on Charleston, Pemberton claimed that without additional support from Richmond, he was forced to relocate defenses closer inland. Ultimately, Pemberton lost the confidence of his command and people of South Carolina. He was reassigned in August 1862 and replaced by General P. G. T. Beauregard, who assumed command on September 24, 1862.

== Stewardship ==
Before European colonization, the coastal lowlands and tidal waterways around what is now known as the Lowcountry, including Cole Island, were inhabited by Indigenous peoples. Local accounts identify Cole Island’s early inhabitants as members of the Stono, Kiawah, and Etiwan peoples, associated with the Stono River, Ashley River, and Cooper River. In modern times, the tribes of the Lowcountry were collectively classified as the “Cusabo” to identify the network of tribes living between Charleston Harbor and the Savannah River.

During the Colonial period, the earliest record of Cole Island's ownership dates to a King’s Grant dated April 30, 1741, on record in the South Carolina Department of Archives and History. King George II of Great Britain granted the parcel of land to a planter named Robert Cole, who would become the island's namesake.

Cole Island has remained privately owned and undeveloped throughout the twentieth century. A 1921 map recorded in the Charleston County Register of Deeds separates and identifies the locations of Snake Island, Pumpkin Island, and Cole Island. Following the recording of this map, the island has officially been referred to as Cole Island, rather than Cole's Island or Coles Island.

Since the late 20th century, Cole Island's stewardship is focused on conservation, preservation, and historical documentation.
