= Fripp Island, South Carolina =

Fripp Island
- Census-designated place
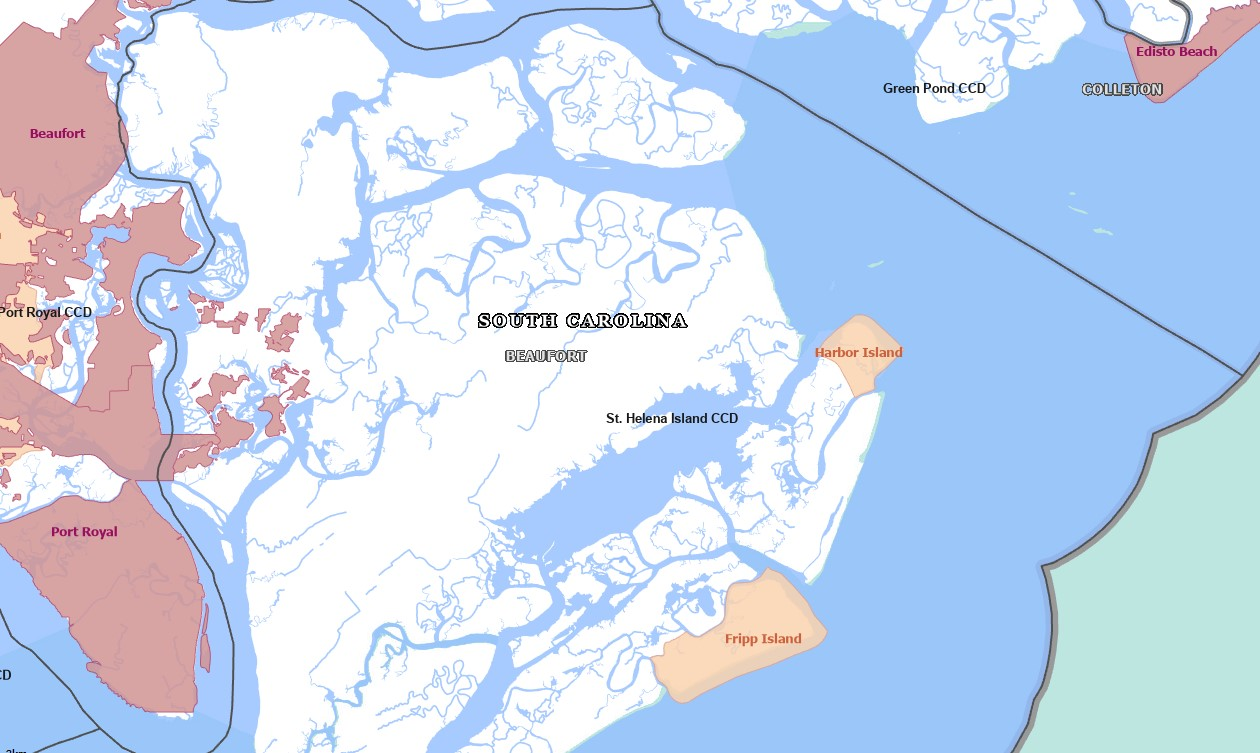

- Beaufort County, South Carolina
- Interactive map of Fripp Island
- Coordinates: 32°19′05″N 80°29′20″W
- Country: United States
- State: South Carolina
- County: Beaufort

Area
  - Total: 4.59 sq mi (11.89 km^{2})
  - Land: 3.26 sq mi (8.45 km^{2})
  - Water: 1.33 sq mi (3.45 km^{2})
- Elevation: 0 ft (0 m)

Population (2020)
  - Total: 963
  - Density: 295.3/sq mi (114.03/km^{2})
- Time zone: UTC-5 (Eastern (EST))
  - Summer (DST): UTC-4 (EDT)
- ZIP code: 29920
- Area codes: 843 and 854
- FIPS code: 45-27565
- GNIS feature ID: 2812932
- Website: Beaufort County Website

Fripp Island is a 6.546 sq mi (16.954 km^{2}) barrier island and census-designated place (CDP) located along the Atlantic coast of the lowcountry part of South Carolina. It was first listed as a CDP in the 2020 census with a population of 963.

It is approximately 21 miles from Beaufort, 96 miles south of Charleston, and 65 miles north of Savannah, Georgia. Some of the neighboring islands include Hunting Island, Harbor Island, Saint Helena Island, Lady's Island, and Pritchard's Island. The island mostly serves as a residential vacation resort, but several hundred residents make it their permanent home. It is also the most seaward of the South Carolina Sea Islands. Fripp is renowned for its resort amenities and natural conservation.

== History ==
Although it has had several names over its history, the island is presently named after Captain Johannes Fripp, a British sailor charged with protecting the Carolina colony from Spanish attacks. Local folklore history has long suspected Fripp to be the location where Edward Teach, the pirate known as Blackbeard, had stowed away some of his treasures. There may have been pirates who stopped at the island, but treasure was seldom buried by 18th-century sea rovers.

Due to its relatively remote location, the island was utilized primarily as a private hunting range for most of its history. In the mid-20th century, upon completion of bridges connecting Beaufort with nearby Hunting Island State Park, investors looked to develop a residential resort community on Fripp. Upon securing bonds and establishing a public service district, a bridge was built in 1961 that connected Fripp with Hunting Island, U.S. Highway 21, and nearby Beaufort and began to stimulate residential development. Within 10 years, developers had built the Ocean Point Golf Links, a Racquet Club for tennis, a marina and a variety of homes and condominium units that would serve as the benchmark for development for the next thirty years.

In 1994, the island underwent its final major development phase on its southwestern end. Ocean Creek Golf Course designed by Davis Love III was built, as well as a new amenities center. Additional housing styles were offered and the marina was expanded. Though the island will not undergo any future expansion, nearly one-third of the lots on the island remain undeveloped.

== Island Services ==
=== Fire Department ===
The need for a fire department was determined in 1962 by legislation establishing the Fripp Island Public Service District. Originally, the fire department and first fire truck was housed in a three-sided building. The fire department started as a volunteer effort and was later recognized by South Carolina as a volunteer organization. In 1982, a new fire station was built to park the two trucks owned by the department. Four years later the Public Service District hired its first professional Fire Chief to operate the department on a daily basis. The fire station that serves as the island's current station was built in 1999. A full-time paramedic was later hired by the county in 2001. The department is composed of 34 volunteers and 19 paid personnel. The department has owned two fire truck pumpers, a squad truck, a Quick Response Vehicle, and a 6-wheeled Beach Rescue ATV since 2006. The fire department's main services include Fire Suppression, Search and Rescue, Medical Emergency Response, Vehicle Extrication, Top Water Rescue, and Fire Prevention and Public Fire Education.

=== Water System ===
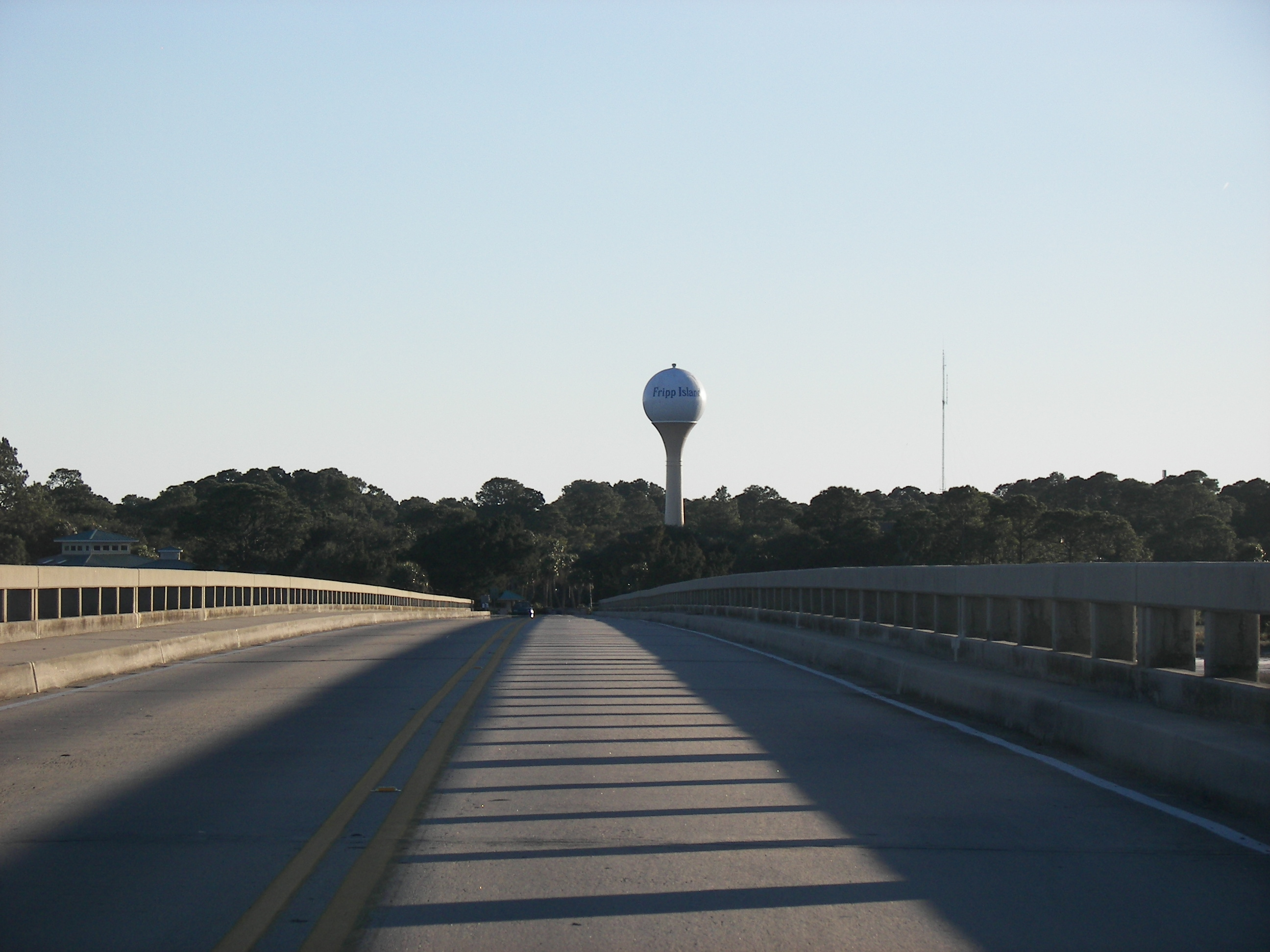
Fripp Island Bridge

In the early days of the island's population, all drinkable water had to be transported onto the island. St. Helena Island started to pump water into Fripp's central water tank by 1965. By 1980, all water was bought from the Beaufort-Jasper Water and Sewer Authority and pumps an average 172 million gallons a year into the island for use by the public.

=== Fripp Inlet Bridge ===
The main bridge leading to Fripp Island was completed in 1964. The legislation authorizing the 2,067 foot bridge called for a two dollar toll; it is now toll-free. The bridge is owned and managed by the Fripp Island Public Service District.

== Geography ==
Geologically speaking, Fripp Island is considered to be a barrier island. The island is the most seaward of the Sea Islands and forms a de facto cape. Located halfway between Charleston, South Carolina and Savannah, Georgia along the coast, it is locally positioned between Hunting Island State Park to the north and Pritchards Island to the southwest. A wide marsh and estuarine system separates these islands from the larger St. Helena's Island to the northwest. The upland acreage of the island is approximately 3,000 acres (12 km^{2}). Fripp has approximately three miles of beachfront along the Atlantic, though some parts of the beach are fully submerged at high tide.

Fripp Island is located approximately 20 miles (30 km) from Beaufort and is connected with the city via U.S. 21. Savannah is approximately a 75-minute drive by car while Charleston is approximately 1 hour and 45 minutes away. Bermuda lies 900 miles (1,450 km) due east of Fripp.

== Population and governance ==
According to the 2000 census, Fripp Island has a year-round primary population of 887 residents. The realistic figure is likely higher than reported because many homeowners consider Fripp Island property as second homes and may spend weeks or months on the island, but do not consider it their primary residence. In summer months the island's population can rise to about 5,000 due to an increase in visitors.

Fripp Island is a private, gated community, run by the Fripp Island Property Owners Association (FIPOA) since the mid-1980s. It is not a municipality though it maintains island operations via a public service district and property owners association. In addition to providing a security force and fire/rescue squad, the island also maintains its own bridges, roads, paths, parks, and beach access routes. Meetings and gatherings are typically held at the Fripp Island Community Centre. An all-faiths chapel is also located on the island.

== Demographics ==
Historical population
Census	Pop.	Note	%±
2020	963		—
U.S. Decennial Census; 2020

Fripp Island first appeared as a census designated place in the 2020 U.S. census.

=== 2020 census ===
Fripp Island CDP, South Carolina – Racial and ethnic composition Note: the US Census treats Hispanic/Latino as an ethnic category. This table excludes Latinos from the racial categories and assigns them to a separate category. Hispanics/Latinos may be of any race.
Race / Ethnicity (NH = Non-Hispanic)	Pop 2020	% 2020
White alone (NH)	909	94.39%
Black or African American alone (NH)	15	1.56%
Native American or Alaska Native alone (NH)	0	0.00%
Asian alone (NH)	9	0.93%
Pacific Islander alone (NH)	0	0.00%
Other race alone (NH)	2	0.21%
Mixed race or Multiracial (NH)	17	1.77%
Hispanic or Latino (any race)	11	1.14%
Total	963	100.00%

Note: the US Census treats Hispanic/Latino as an ethnic category. This table excludes Latinos from the racial categories and assigns them to a separate category. Hispanics/Latinos can be of any race.

== Transportation ==
Although cars and trucks are allowed on roads and streets, golf carts are the prevailing method of transportation on the island. Bicycles are also popular and are used among residents and visitors alike, and several streets offer parallel bike trails to separate bicyclists from motor vehicles.

== Nature ==
=== Flora ===
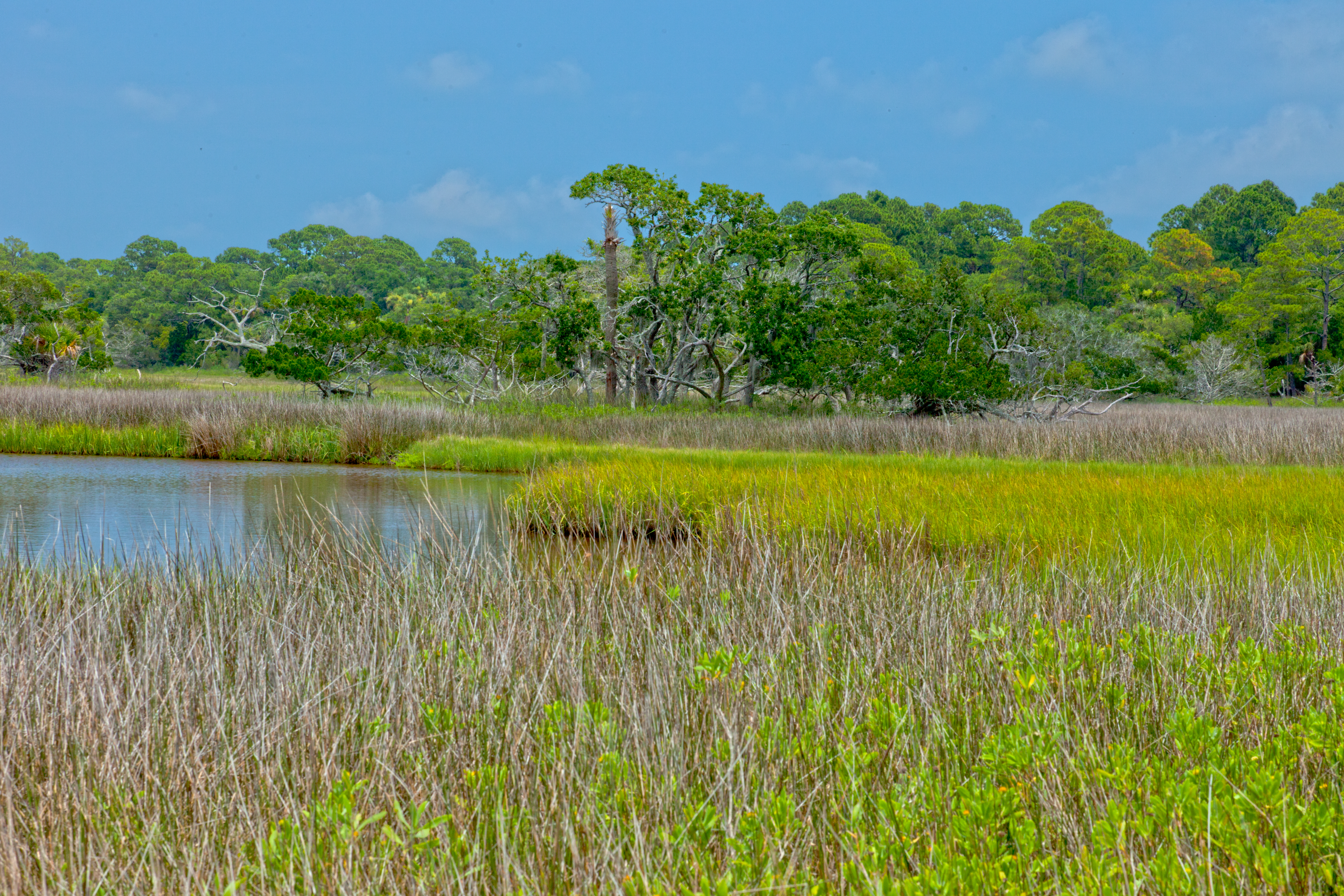
Salt marsh on Fripp Island

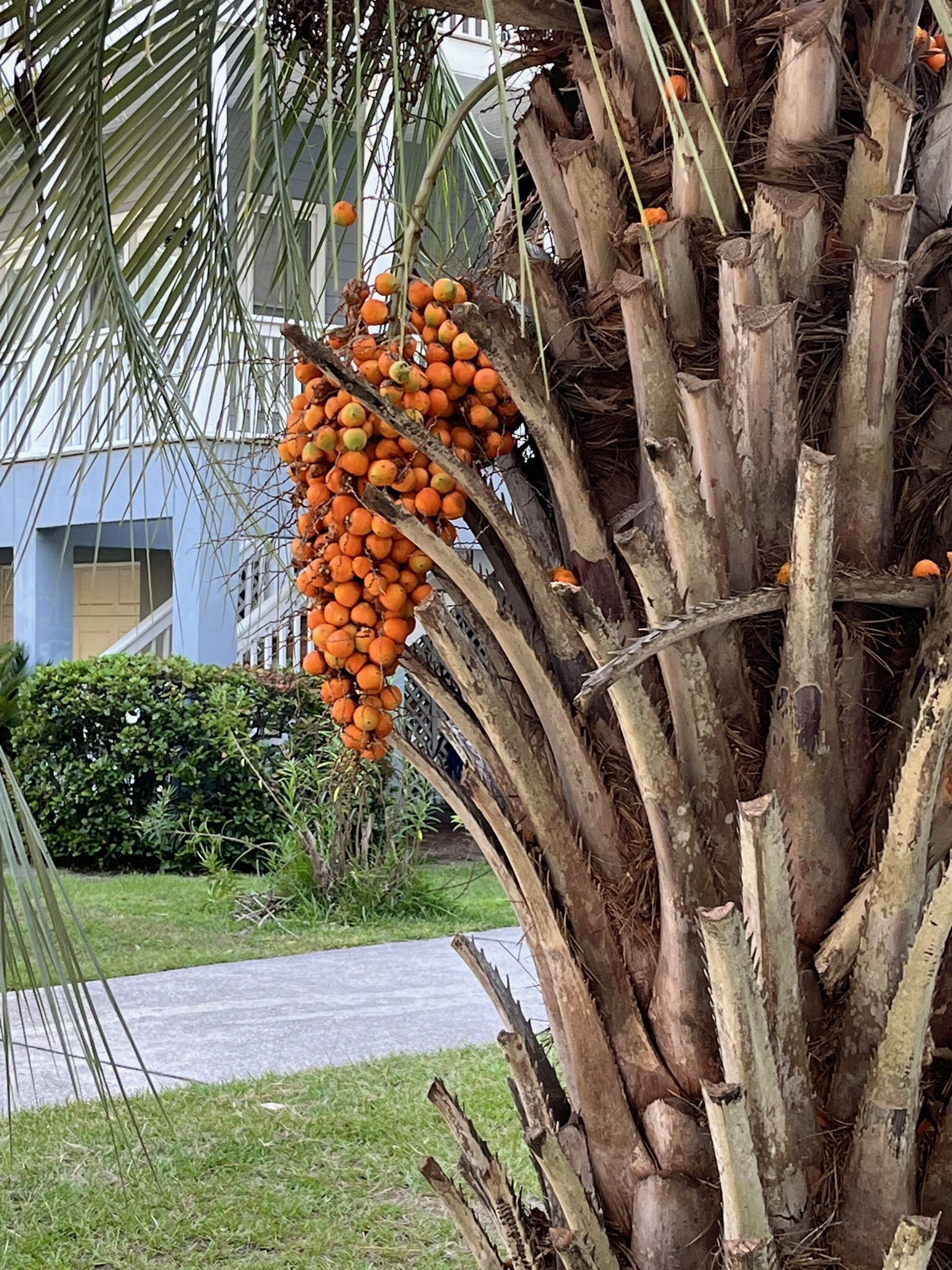
Jelly palm fruits on Fripp Island

Most of the island's trees are loblolly pine and palm trees (mainly cabbage palmetto, saw palmetto, and cycads) though there are some hardwood live oak and magnolia stands located throughout the island. Spanish moss is a prevalent feature as well.

=== Fauna ===
Prior to human development, the island was fertile ground for several wild animals, including wild hogs. Development though has been carefully undertaken to preserve much of the wildlife habitat that existed beforehand. It is common to see deer in any area across the island, and population control of deer has been a major concern for the island. There are several small mammals that inhabit Fripp, including squirrels, raccoons, opossums, bats, and armadillos. Most interior lagoons contain an alligator population.

Fripp and its surrounding areas are home to dozens of species of birds. Among the most striking include populations of egrets, herons, osprey, and pelicans, though seagulls are the most common. Island residents established an Audubon Club in 1978 and the entire island is an Audubon-designated bird preserve.

The island is a major loggerhead turtle hatchery and an active group of residents works to make the beaches safe for the laying turtles by observing outside lighting precautions during nesting seasons and protecting nests from predation by humans, raccoons and other animals.

Numerous fish and crustacean species can be found in the waterways and estuaries that surround the island, and the island remains a popular destination for fishing and crabbing. Fiddler crab is the most common of crab species, while blue crab is the most common species caught.

== Media ==
- The Pat Conroy novel Beach Music makes reference to the "Isle of Orion", which is a fictional stand-in for Fripp Island. Conroy was a full-time resident of the island for many years, but resided in Beaufort until his death in March 2016.
- The Vietnam War scenes from the movie Forrest Gump (1994) were filmed on Fripp Island. Also, many other scenes were filmed in the Beaufort area. The Gay Fish Company, right outside of Fripp, sold shrimp to the production and served as a real life prop for the shrimping boat scene.
- Rudyard Kipling's The Jungle Book was filmed on this island in 1994. Jason Scott Lee starred as Mowgli. His scenes featuring wild animals were shot on the island near the present location of the Ocean Creek Golf Course as well as Fall Creek Falls State Park in Tennessee.
- The Prince of Tides (1991), based on the Pat Conroy novel of the same name, was partially filmed on Fripp Island in 1990. The home of Tom (Nick Nolte) and Sally Wingo (Blythe Danner) and their children is located along the beach on the northern section of the island.
