= Folly Boat =

Local landmark

Coordinates: 32.68373°N 79.95838°W

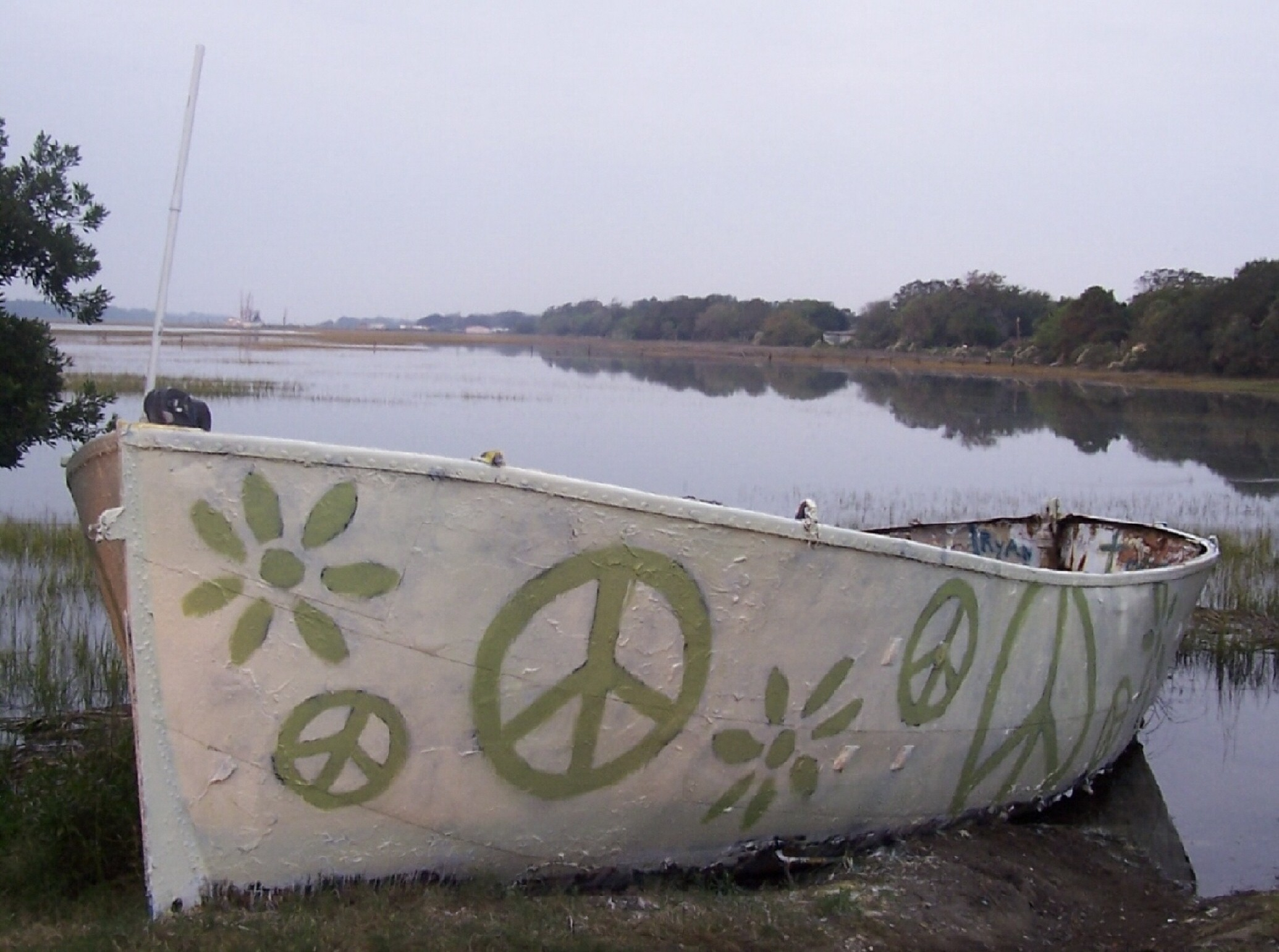
The Folly Boat in 2004

The Folly Boat is a boat that washed up alongside Folly Road in Folly Beach, South Carolina, during Hurricane Hugo in 1989. After nobody claimed the boat, local residents and visitors alike began painting messages and pictures on the side of it, usually to commemorate special occasions. It became an unofficial symbol of Folly Beach.

== History ==
The boat, of unknown origin, washed ashore when Category 4 Hugo made landfall in South Carolina on September 22, 1989. Made of steel and subsequently filled with concrete, it is estimated to weigh approximately 20 tons.

On September 11, 2017, flooding from Hurricane Irma again moved the Folly Boat, depositing it next to a privately owned dock on Sol Legare Road.

In December 2019, the boat was moved back to Folly Road next to a now-closed barroom, one mile north of the original location.

The boat remains a Low Country landmark and continues to be painted regularly.

== See also ==
- Participatory art
