= John Seabrook Plantation Bridge =

- U.S. National Register of Historic Places
- Location within South Carolina Location within the United States
- Location: Northwest of Rockville off South Carolina Highway 700, near Rockville, South Carolina
- Coordinates: 32°37′38″N 80°12′37″W
- Area: 0.1 acres (0.040 ha)
- Built: 1782
- NRHP reference No.: 74001841
- Added to NRHP: October 9, 1974

John Seabrook Plantation Bridge, also known as Admiral George Palmer's Bridge, is a historic arch bridge located at Rockville, Charleston County, South Carolina. It was built about 1782, and is constructed of brick veneer enclosing a fill mixture of crushed oyster shells and rammed earth.

It was listed on the National Register of Historic Places in 1974.
