= Folly Beach, South Carolina =

- City
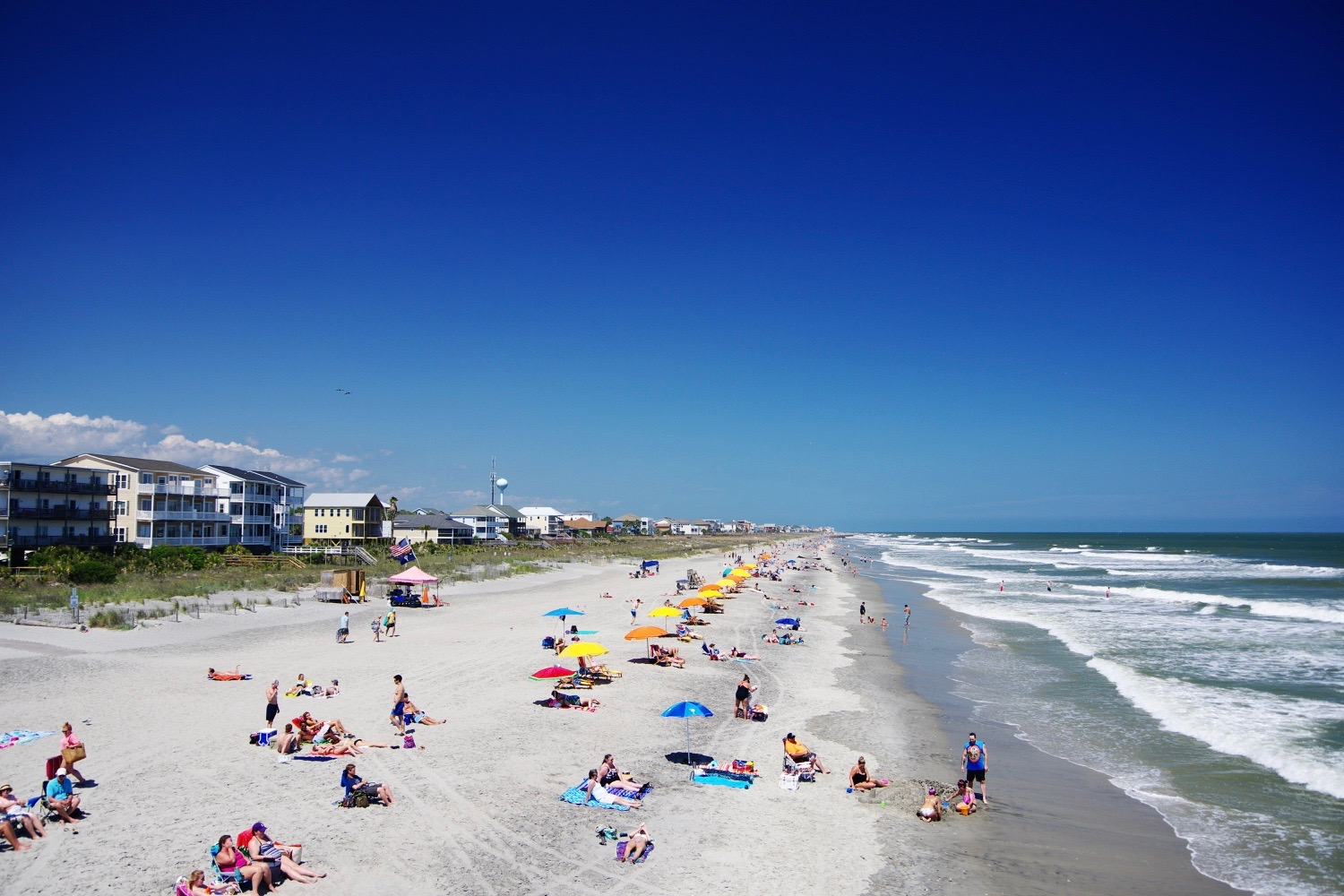
- Folly Beach

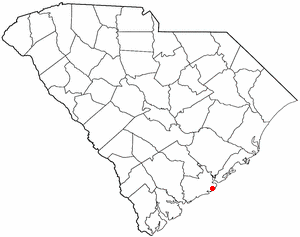
- Location of Folly Beach in South Carolina
- Coordinates: 32°38′48″N 79°58′41″W
- Country: United States
- State: South Carolina
- County: Charleston
- Incorporated: 1938 (town), 1973 (city)

Area
  - Total: 18.87 sq mi (48.87 km^{2})
  - Land: 12.51 sq mi (32.39 km^{2})
  - Water: 6.36 sq mi (16.48 km^{2})
- Elevation: 0 ft (0 m)

Population (2020)
  - Total: 2,078
  - Density: 166.1/sq mi (64.15/km^{2})
- Time zone: UTC-5 (EST)
  - Summer (DST): UTC-4 (EDT)
- ZIP code: 29439
- Area code: 843, 854
- FIPS code: 45-26035
- GNIS feature ID: 2403628
- Website: www.cityoffollybeach.com

Folly Beach is a public city on Folly Island in Charleston County, South Carolina, United States. As of the 2020 census, Folly Beach had a population of 2,078. Folly Beach is within the Charleston-North Charleston-Summerville metropolitan area and the Charleston-North Charleston Urbanized Areas.

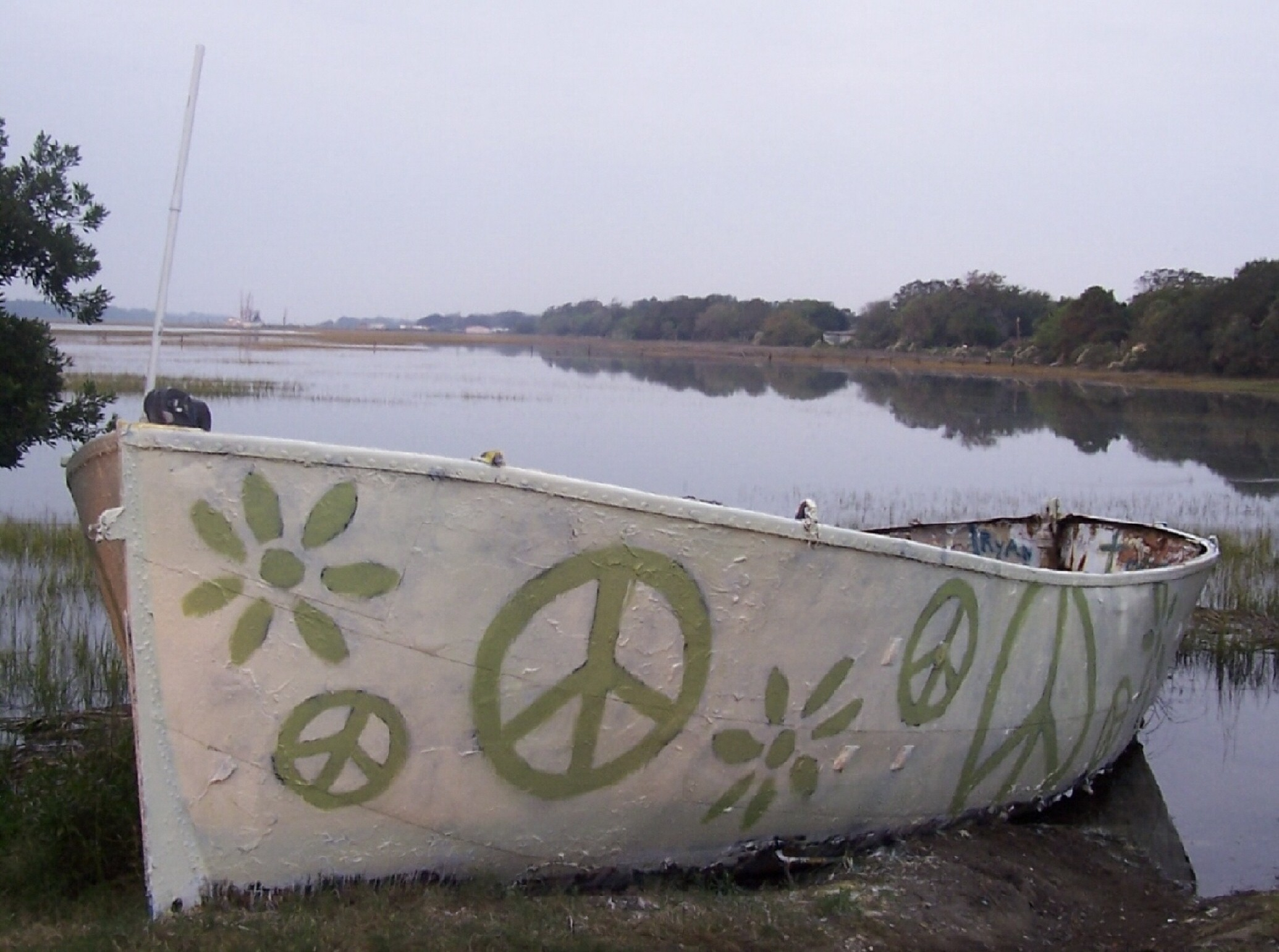
The Folly Boat, located on Folly Road, is an unofficial symbol of Folly Beach.

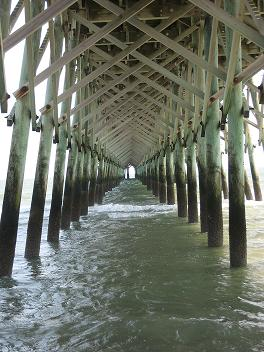
Under Folly Beach Pier

== History ==
The Folly North Site (38CH1213) and Secessionville Historic District are listed on the National Register of Historic Places.

== Geography ==
Folly Beach is 11 miles (18 km) south of downtown Charleston along the Atlantic Ocean.

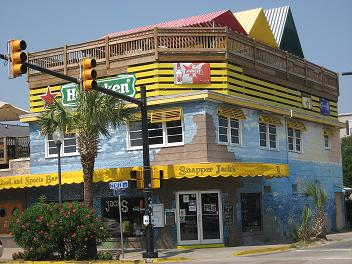
Center Street at Folly Beach

According to the United States Census Bureau, the city has an area of 18.9 square miles (48.9 km^{2}), of which 12.5 square miles (32.4 km^{2}) is land and 6.4 square miles (16.5 km^{2}), or 33.72%, is water.

Known to Charleston locals as "the Edge of America", Folly Beach is home to numerous surf spots, the most popular being the Washout, 10th Street and the Folly Beach Pier. Despite its usually calm conditions, Folly Beach has gained prominence as one of the more popular surf spots along the East Coast. Folly Beach is an eclectic beach community with surf shops, restaurants, gift shops, offices, and bars along Center Street; the main road and gateway to the community.

Endangered North Atlantic right whales, the state animal of Georgia and South Carolina, migrate along the coast during the migration seasons.

== Demographics ==
Historical population
Census	Pop.	Note	%±
1960	1,137		—
1970	1,157		1.8%
1980	1,478		27.7%
1990	1,398		−5.4%
2000	2,116		51.4%
2010	2,617		23.7%
2020	2,078		−20.6%
U.S. Decennial Census

=== 2020 census ===
As of the 2020 census, Folly Beach had a population of 2,078, 1,057 households, and 716 families residing in the city.

The median age was 57.4 years, with 12.0% of residents under the age of 18 and 32.4% aged 65 years or older.

For every 100 females there were 94.9 males, and for every 100 females age 18 and over there were 95.2 males age 18 and over.

91.7% of residents lived in urban areas, while 8.3% lived in rural areas.

Of the 1,057 households in Folly Beach, 13.6% had children under the age of 18 living in them, 50.2% were married-couple households, 19.2% were households with a male householder and no spouse or partner present, and 24.7% were households with a female householder and no spouse or partner present; 34.5% of all households were made up of individuals and 15.9% had someone living alone who was 65 years of age or older.

There were 2,391 housing units, of which 55.8% were vacant. The homeowner vacancy rate was 0.6% and the rental vacancy rate was 12.9%.

Racial composition as of the 2020 census
Race	Number	Percent
White	1,954	94.0%
Black or African American	19	0.9%
American Indian and Alaska Native	7	0.3%
Asian	9	0.4%
Native Hawaiian and Other Pacific Islander	0	0.0%
Some other race	10	0.5%
Two or more races	79	3.8%
Hispanic or Latino (of any race)	28	1.3%

== Government ==
The city is run by an elected strong mayor-council government system.

=== Mayor ===
Chris Bizzell

=== Council members ===
DJ Rich, Katherine Houghton, E.D., William Farley, Billy Grooms, Eddie Ellis, and Chris Bizzell

=== Voting patterns ===
In 2006, the city's residents voted against Amendment 1, which sought to ban same-sex marriage in South Carolina. Statewide, the measure passed by 78% to 22%, but the voters of Folly Beach rejected it by a vote of 503 (48.8%) to 528 (51.2%).

=== County parks ===
The Charleston County Park and Recreation Commission (CCPRC) operates numerous facilities in Charleston County. In Folly Beach, the county operates Folly Beach County Park, Folly Beach Fishing Pier and the Folly River Boat Landing.

== Education ==
There is one school district in the county, Charleston County School District.

It is zoned to James Island Elementary School, Camp Road Middle School, and James Island Charter High School.
