= Hunting Island State Park =

Barrier island and state park in South Carolina, United States

- Hunting Island
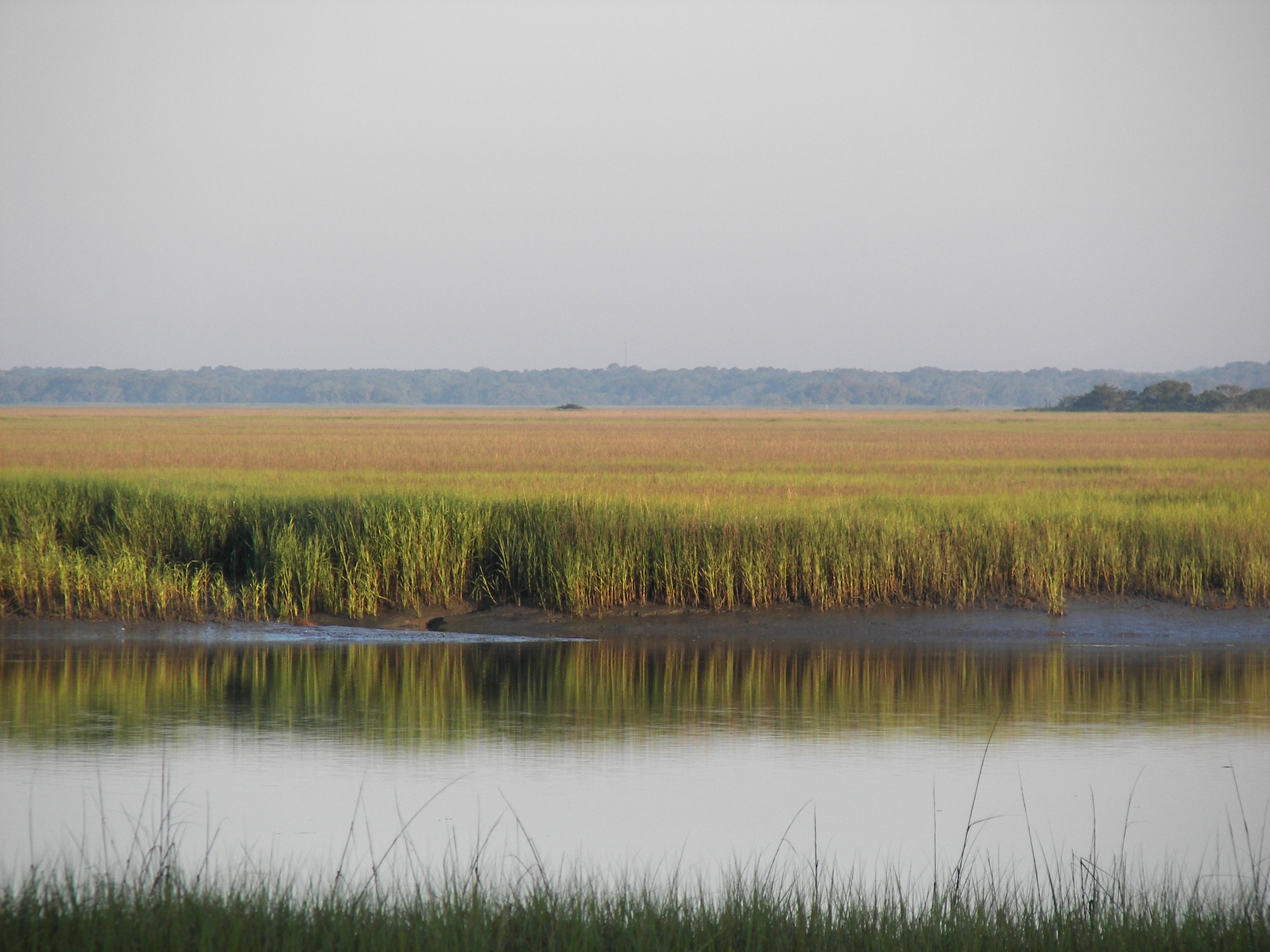
- Marshes surrounding Hunting Island
- Interactive map of Hunting Island State Park
- Type: State park
- Location: Beaufort County, South Carolina, United States (Lowcountry & Sea Islands)
- Nearest city: Beaufort
- Coordinates: 32°21′59″N 80°26′40″W
- Area: 5,000 acres (20.2 km^{2})
- Elevation: Sea level
- Created: 1935
- Etymology: "Hunting Islands" map reference (c. 18th century)
- Operator: South Carolina Department of Parks, Recreation & Tourism
- Visitors: 1.2 million
- Camp sites: Both regular and RV campsites
- Hiking trails: island hike/bike trail (8.0 mi); campground trail (1.0 mi); marsh boardwalk (0.4 mi)
- Other information: Admission fees: $8.00 for adults $5.00 for S.C. seniors $4.00 for children ages 6-15 free for children ages 0-5
- Website: southcarolinaparks.com/hunting-island

Hunting Island is a 5,000-acre (20 km^{2}) secluded semitropical barrier island located 15 miles (24 km) east of Beaufort, South Carolina, United States in between Harbor Island and Fripp Island. Since 1935, it has been classified as a state park. It is the most-visited state park facility in South Carolina and is a part of the ACE Basin estuarine reserve area. Known for its natural environment, the island remains one of the few remaining undeveloped Sea Islands in the Lowcountry. The park is known for its 19th century lighthouse which bears its name. The park's beach has been featured in several travel publications and was listed in 2013 as a Top 25 beach in the United States by TripAdvisor.

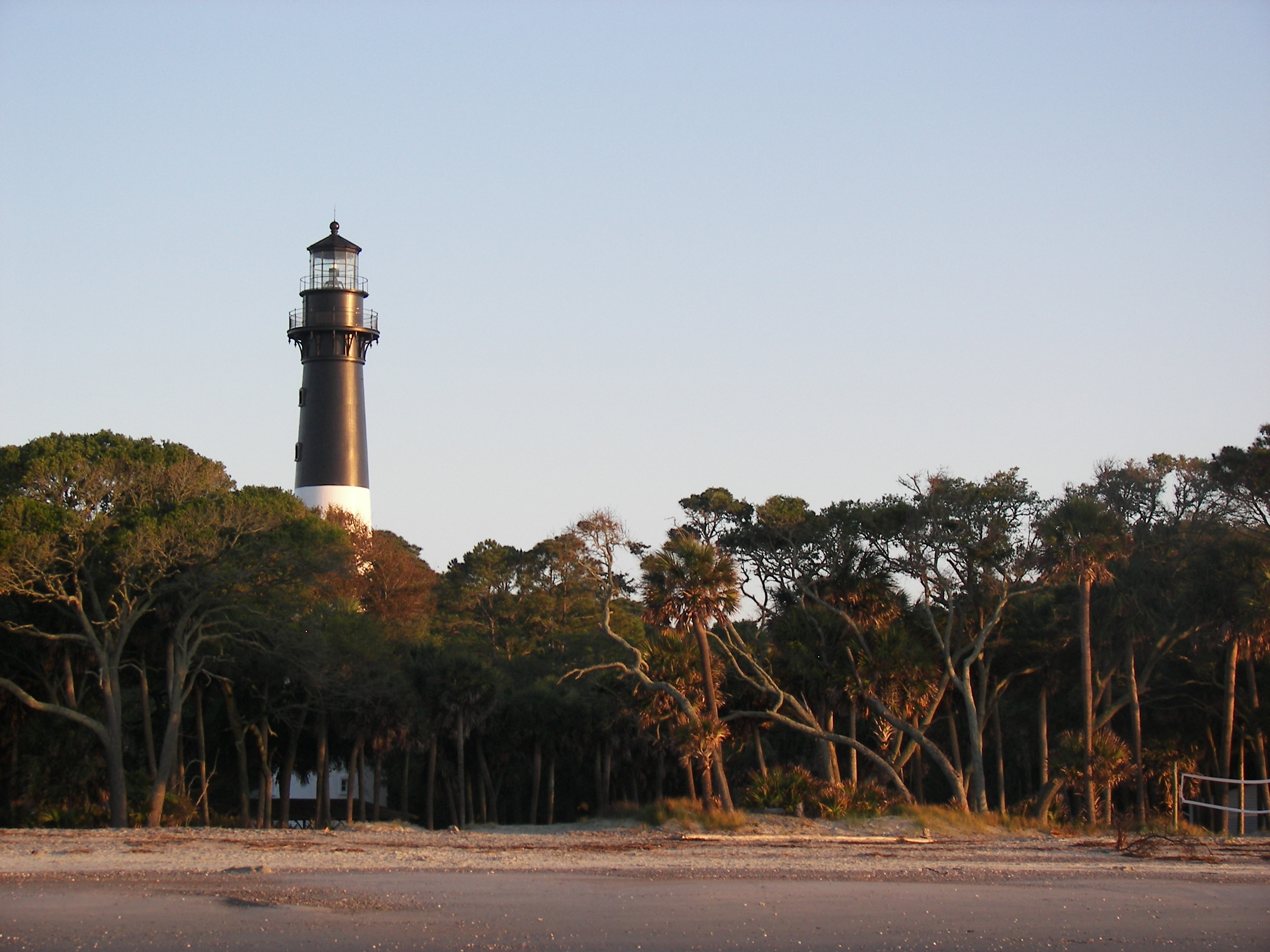
The Hunting Island lighthouse from beach

== History ==
Hunting Island retains its colonial designation of the "Hunting Islands," which served as hunting preserves for Lowcountry planters and elite in the 19th and early 20th centuries. Hunting Island Lighthouse was constructed in the 1850s and soon thereafter destroyed by Confederate forces in the early days of the Civil War. Ten years after the Civil War ended the lighthouse was rebuilt, and later relocated to its current position. The 1893 Sea Islands hurricane swept Hunting Island and other nearby Sea Islands clean, but the lighthouse survived.

In the 1930s, the island was developed into a state park by the Civilian Conservation Corps as bridges were constructed to connect the outer Sea Islands with Beaufort. Thanks to limited human development, the island remains a preserve for its abundant wildlife. There are more than 4 miles (6.4 km) of beach, a dense maritime forest in the interior areas, and an extensive saltwater marsh on the western side. The most notable attraction is the 19th-century lighthouse, listed on the National Register of Historic Places. While not operational, the lighthouse tower features a rotating light in the tower that is turned on at night.

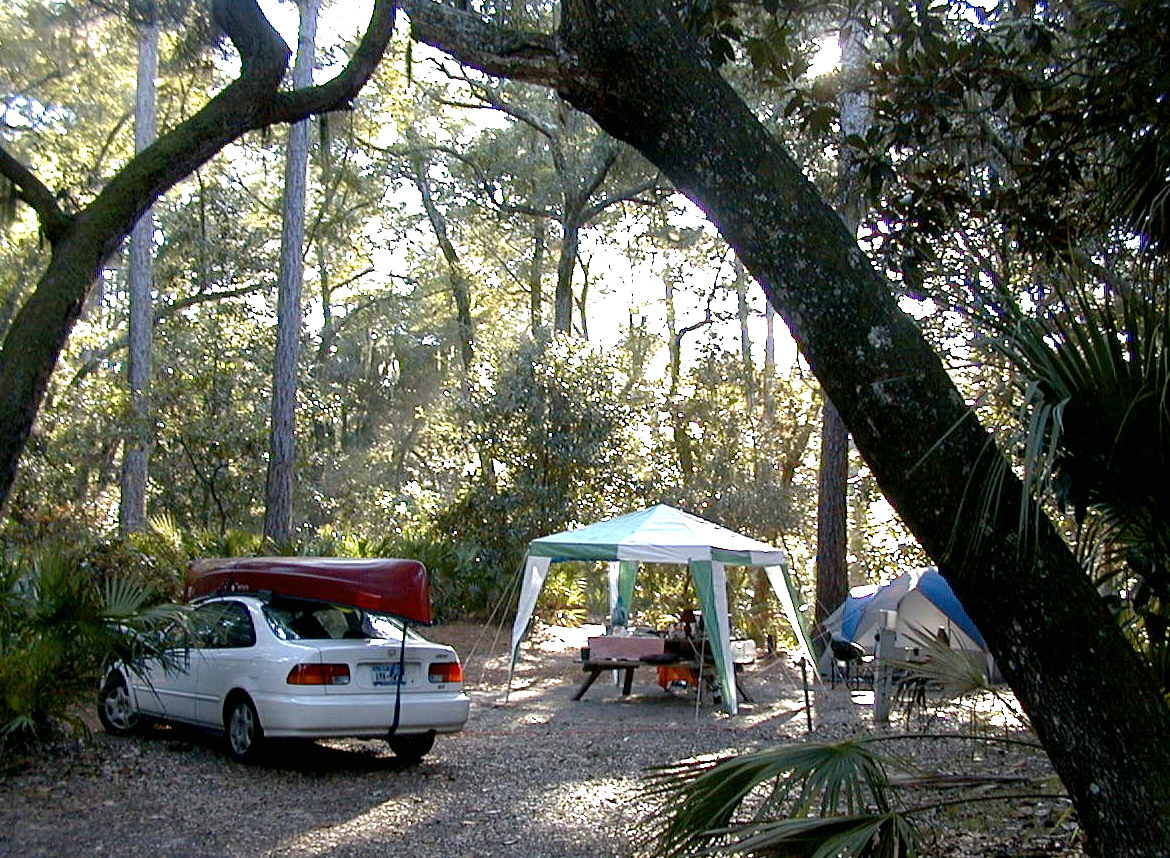
A campsite at Hunting Island

The southern terminus of U.S. Route 21 has been on Hunting Island since 1953. US 21 extended to the south end of the island until about 1980, when erosion destroyed a portion of the highway, forcing the state to create a new entrance to the park and a set of one-lane roads through the palmetto forest. US 21 now ends at the point where it formerly veered east toward the lighthouse.

Since 1980, Hunting Island has suffered major beach erosion as a result of heavy tides from the confluence of the Atlantic Ocean and Saint Helena Sound, and is expected to shrink in size by ten per cent over the next forty years. At times there is ride-able surf on the island, which is best three hours before high tide due to the large continental shelf effect on incoming waves.

In 1993, most of the Vietnam War scenes in Forrest Gump were filmed on Hunting Island and neighboring Fripp Island. Sequences from 1997's G.I. Jane were also filmed in forests on the island.

In 2017, South Carolina purchased St. Phillips Island from Ted Turner, which is now operated as part of Hunting Island State Park, with a regular ferry to take tours of the island.

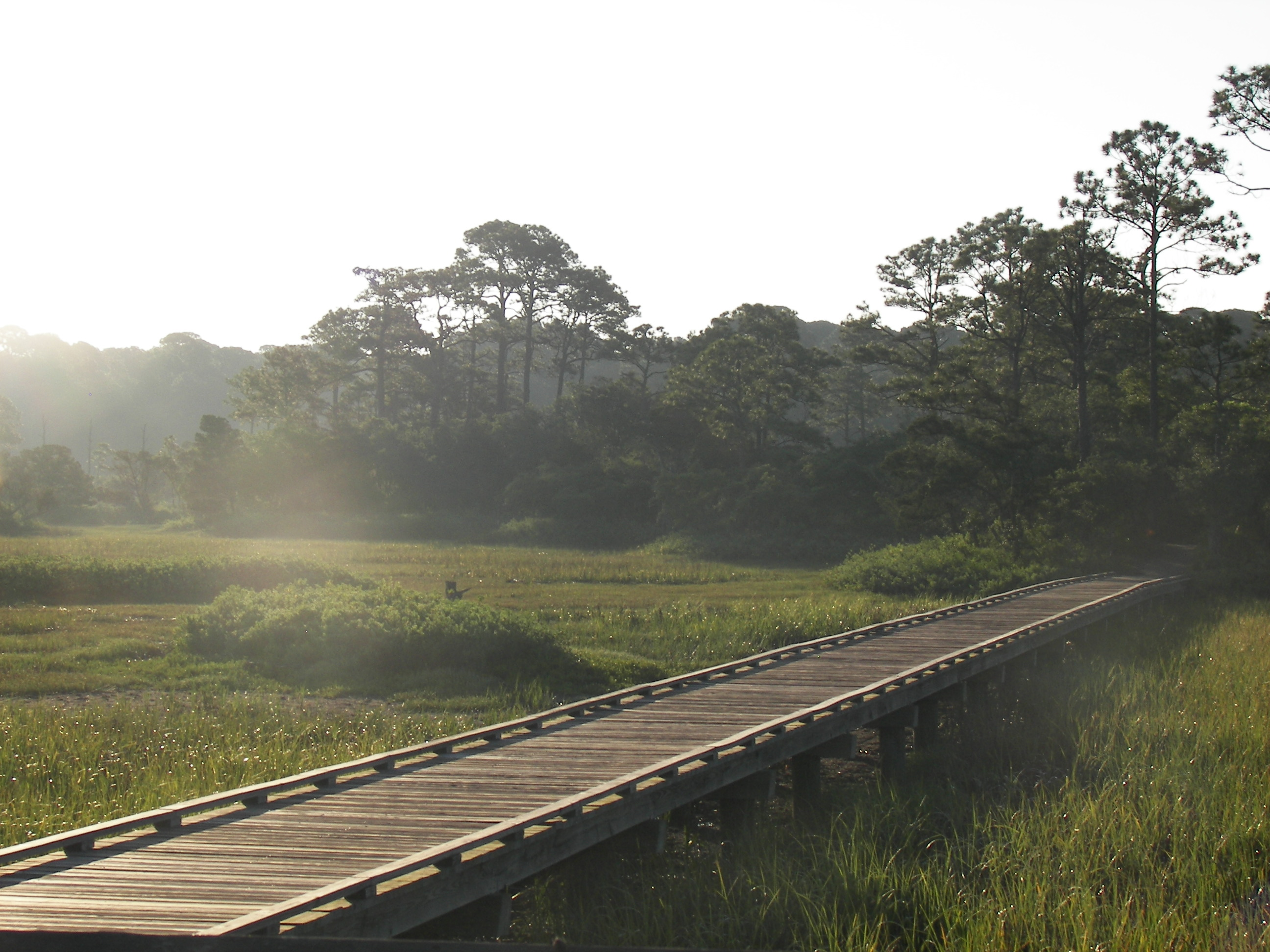
The Marsh Boardwalk at Hunting Island

== Wildlife ==
The wildlife includes loggerhead turtles, deer, alligators, raccoons, minks, diamondback rattlesnakes, and hundreds of species of birds. The island has an abundance of herons and egrets, as well as summertime sightings of the painted bunting. The interior lagoon (which was created by sand dredging in 1968) has become naturalized and home to such species as seahorses and barracuda.

Each summer loggerhead turtle hatchlings emerge from the sand and walk out to the ocean. Around 60 and 130 nests are laid annually on the beach. A volunteer organization, the Friends of Hunting Island has a permit from the South Carolina Department of Natural Resources to find and protect the nests. Each morning during nesting season, volunteers walk every mile of the beach to help find and protect nests.

== Facilities ==
Hunting Island provides locations for recreational vehicles and tent campers on the northern portion of the island. There used to be many private cabins along Cabin Road on the south half of the island. They have all been destroyed by high beach erosion, leaving behind broken pavement and fallen trees, nicknamed "The Bone Yard" by local staff. The old ranger's cabin, next to the lighthouse, has been updated and is now the only rental cabin on the island. All other dwellings are for staff. As of 2024, land on the island is being prepared for more public rental cabins, well away from the beach erosion.

A 2-mile-long (3.2 km) lagoon is adjacent to a washed-out cabin road and serves as a popular location for fishing.

Hunting Island Visitors Center is located in the middle of the island, overlooking a small lagoon. The center provides general information on the island, a virtual tour of the lighthouse, and has space for activities and offices for park staff. The center is also connected with Hunting Island's extensive trail system and is a short distance to several beach access points.

The Hunting Island Nature Center features live animals and exhibits about the habitats and history of the park. The center is located at the entrance to the Paradise Pier fishing pier, which juts into the Fripp Inlet between Hunting and Fripp Island.

The lighthouse is open year round to the public when maintenance is not being performed. Visitors are able to climb to the viewing deck of the 136-foot-tall (41 m) tower for a nominal fee. While not in true operation, a light on a thirty second delay has been installed in the lighthouse to provide the signature blink of the lighthouse.

Hunting Island's 4 miles (6.4 km) of beachfront provide a pristine, natural experience for visitors. Although the beach is heavily eroded towards the southern end of the island, ample shore remains in the central section and in the campground areas towards the north end.

The state park also features several trails for hiking and biking, including a 6.1-mile (9.8 km) loop trail that cuts through the maritime forest and along the lagoon. The trail also connects to the Marsh Boardwalk, a popular stop for photographers. A short 5-minute walk leads visitors across a section of marsh onto a hammock and towards a deck along a tidal creek.

There are plenty of public restrooms and showers near the lighthouse and in the campground. There is a small snack and novelty shop near the lighthouse and a larger general store in the campground.

== See also ==
- Hunting Island Lighthouse
