= Hunting Island Lighthouse =

Lighthouse in South Carolina, US

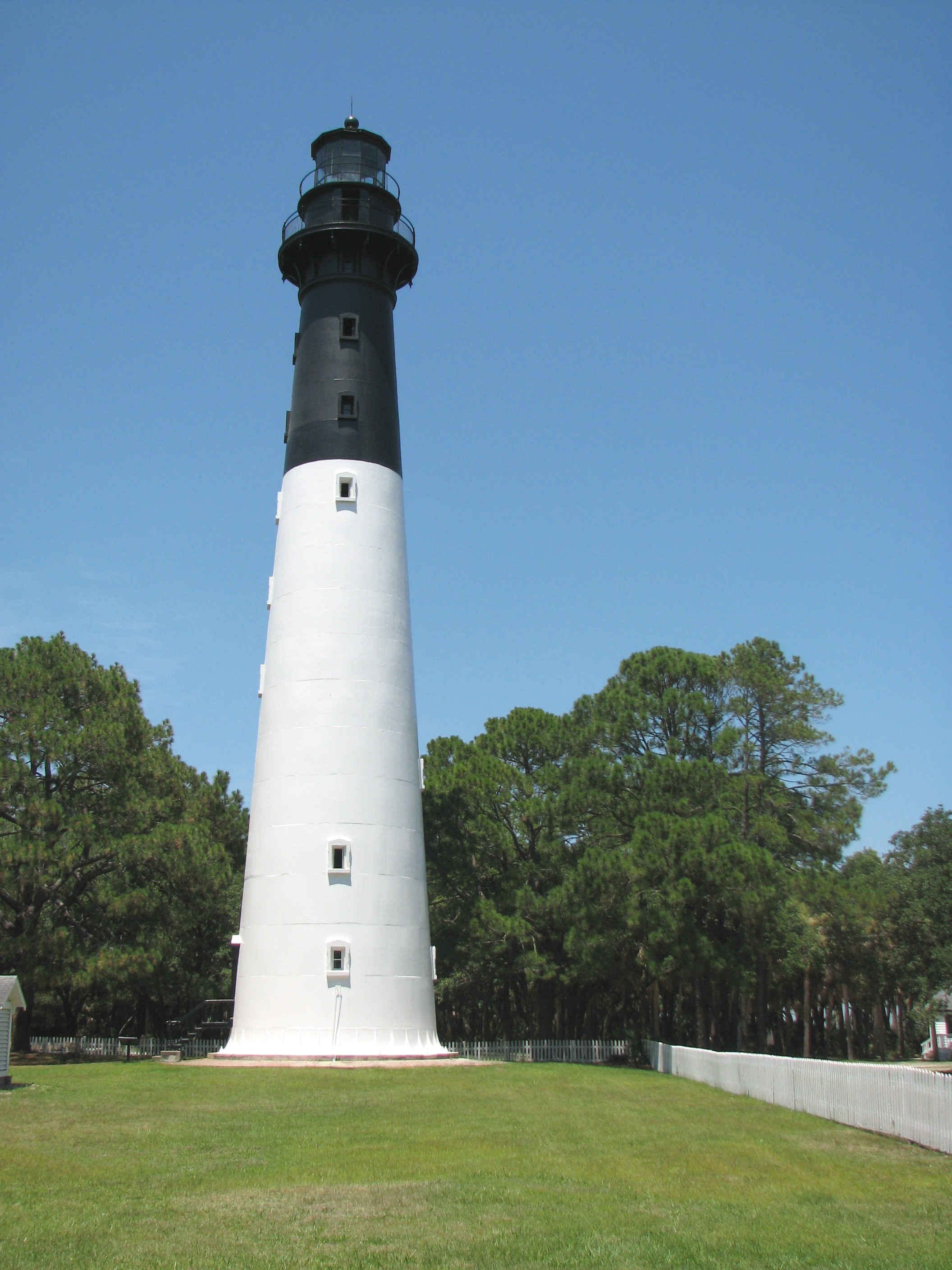
- Location: Hunting Island State Park, South Carolina
- Coordinates: 32°22′32″N 80°26′15″W

Tower
- Constructed: 1859
- Foundation: Natural / Emplaced
- Construction: Cast Iron / Brick lined
- Height: 136 feet (41 m)
- Shape: Conical
- Heritage: National Register of Historic Places listed place

Light
- First lit: 1875
- Deactivated: 1933
- Focal height: 40 m (130 ft)
- Lens: Second order Fresnel lens
- Range: 17 nmi (31 km; 20 mi)
- Characteristic: FF W, FI W30s
- Hunting Island State Park Lighthouse
- U.S. National Register of Historic Places
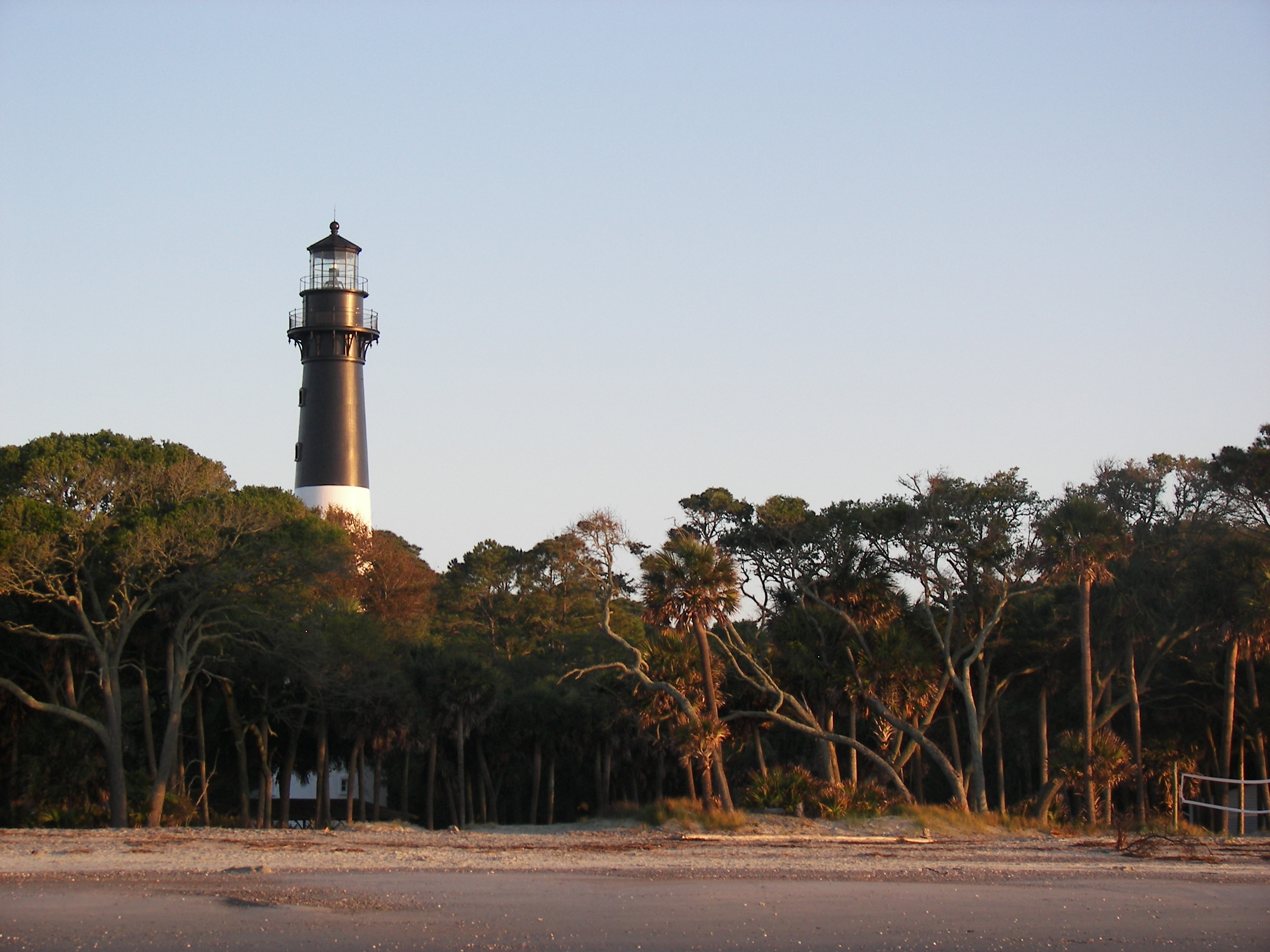
- View from the beach, June 2009
- Nearest city: Beaufort, South Carolina
- Area: 5 acres (2.0 ha)
- Built: 1889
- Built by: US Coast Guard
- NRHP reference No.: 70000561
- Added to NRHP: June 5, 1970

The Hunting Island Light is located in Hunting Island State Park on Hunting Island near Beaufort, South Carolina. Although no longer used as a functioning lighthouse, the tower is a fixture at the state park and is open to visitors. It was named to the National Register of Historic Places in 1970.

== Overview ==
The tower is made mostly of brick with a cast-iron shell. The conical tower is 132.6 feet (40.4 m) and had a second-order Fresnel. The original lamp, clockwork movement and the Fresnel lens was removed when it was decommissioned in 1933. The 1st order lens from the Morris island lighthouse is at base of the tower for the public to view. The top third of the tower is painted black and the lower two-thirds is painted white. A fog horn was not installed.

Currently, an LED lamp is in place flashing the original flash pattern from 1859 in the lighthouse. It is turned on at dusk and flashes through the night providing night visitors to the island the feel of an operating lighthouse. When operational, the Hunting Island Lighthouse was visible for 17 miles. Historic records from March 1890 note that the lighthouse was complete, "including one of the larger sized fire proof oil light houses."

== History ==
Construction started in 1859, but was set back as the tower was destroyed during the Civil War in 1862. Major George H. Elliot is credited with the 1860s development of what is known as the "segmented cast-iron" lighthouse design. In the United States, two were constructed: the Hunting Island Lighthouse and subsequently Florida's Cape Canaveral Light. Hunting Island's Lighthouse was designed to be disassembled and moved if required. It consists of cast-iron sections, each weighing up to 1200 pounds which are bolted together to form the shell. the shell is lined with brick, which constitutes the main load-bearing structural element.

Erection commenced in 1873 and was completed in 1875. With its 167 steps that lead to an impressive observation deck, the Hunting Island Lighthouse has a handsomely built cast and wrought-iron staircase, railings and support beams that were fashioned by the Phoenix Iron Works company of Philadelphia. The Lighthouse was first located on the northern portion of Hunting Island, South Carolina, but severe beach erosion threatened the light station and its structures. By 1888 it was reported that the Atlantic Ocean's high tide had reached within 35 feet of the keeper's house. As a result, the lighthouse, the keeper's home and two other structures were relocated a mile away in 1889 to their present locale.

At the time of the 1893 Sea Islands Hurricane, the Hunting Island Lighthouse functioned as a sanctuary for some passengers aboard the steamer "City of Savannah I" which had been forced onto the shoals. The Lighthouse continued operation until deactivation in 1933. It was listed in the National Register of Historic Places in 1977 as reference #70000561. In 2009, celebrations were held in honor of the lighthouse's 150th anniversary.

== Maintenance ==
As part of Hunting Island State Park, the tower remains open to the public. Continued remodeling of the tower is made possible by South Carolina funding and a small charge per visitor to the tower.

In 2003 the lighthouse was closed for an 18-month period after rust had compromised the structural integrity of several of its cast-iron stairs. Repairs lasted for over 18 months, and included fixing cracked stairs, as well as the installation of steel brace reinforcements. The silvery-grayish braces stand in stark contrast to the black cast-iron stairs, which in turn allows visitors to distinguish between the original structural components and the more-recent modifications aimed at protecting the lighthouse's historic integrity.

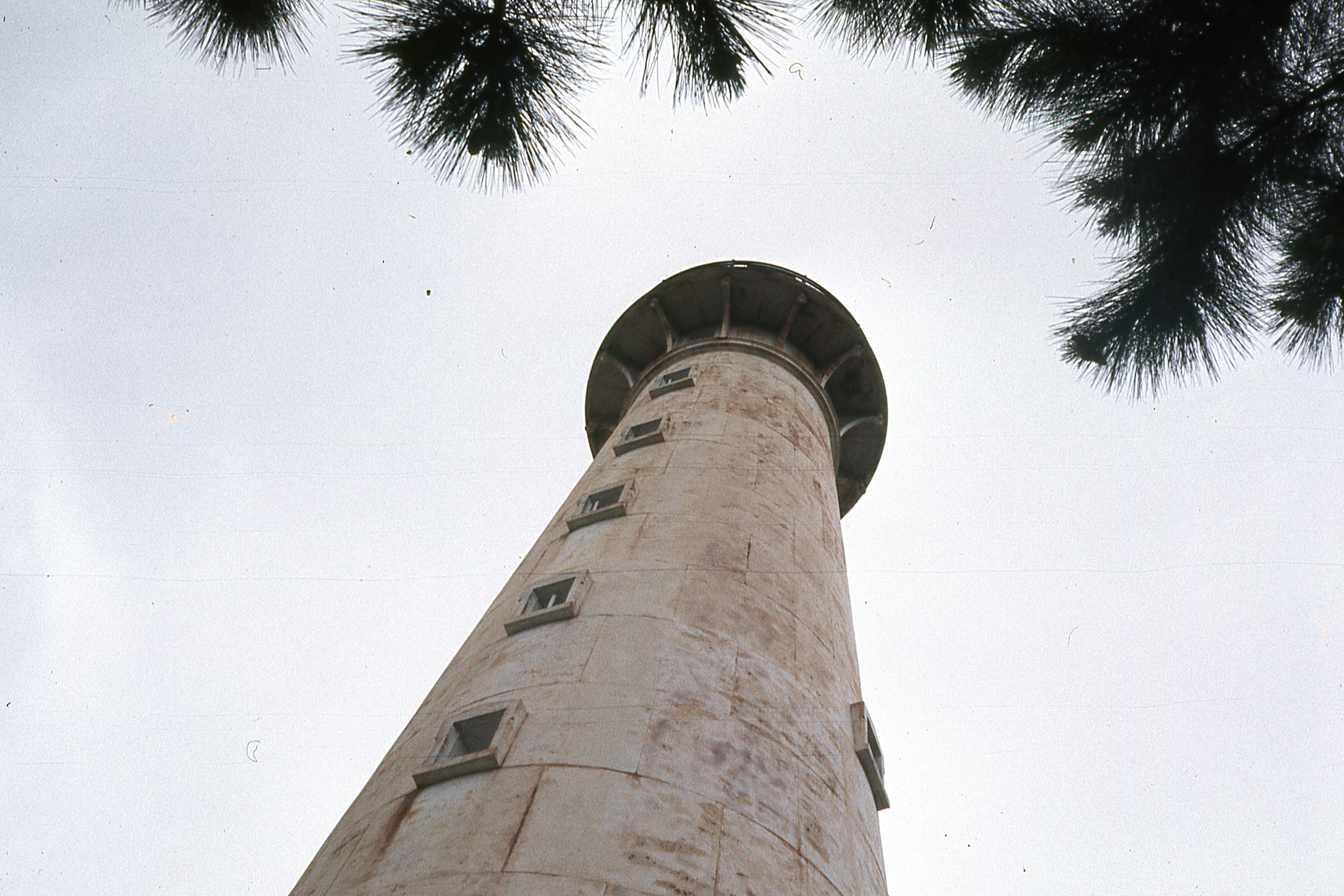
The lighthouse seen before its current color scheme, 1972.

In 2019, engineering studies concluded that $3 million in repairs were needed to the lighthouse, particularly to repair cracks and corrosion due to weather. Part of the repairs may include the disassembly and potential relocation of the lighthouse further inland, similar to actions taken in 1889. The lighthouse closed to the public for the repairs from 2022 to 2026, reopening to the public on May 26th, 2026.
