= Folly North Site (38CH1213) =

Archaeological site in South Carolina, United States

- Folly North Site-38CH1213
- U.S. National Register of Historic Places
- Nearest city: Folly Beach, South Carolina
- Area: 75 acres (30 ha)
- Built: 1863
- NRHP reference No.: 03001001
- Added to NRHP: October 2, 2003

Folly North Site (38CH1213), also known as Little Folly Island, is a historic archaeological site located at Folly Beach, Charleston County, South Carolina. The site contains the extant remains of two American Civil War artillery batteries constructed by the Union Army in 1863. Artifacts associated with eight other batteries and Fort Green have likely eroded into the Atlantic Ocean. The batteries and fortifications were built as part of the Union effort to capture Charleston, South Carolina.

It was listed on the National Register of Historic Places in 2003.
