= Harbor Island, South Carolina =

Island east of Beaufort, South Carolina

Harbor Island
- Census-designated place
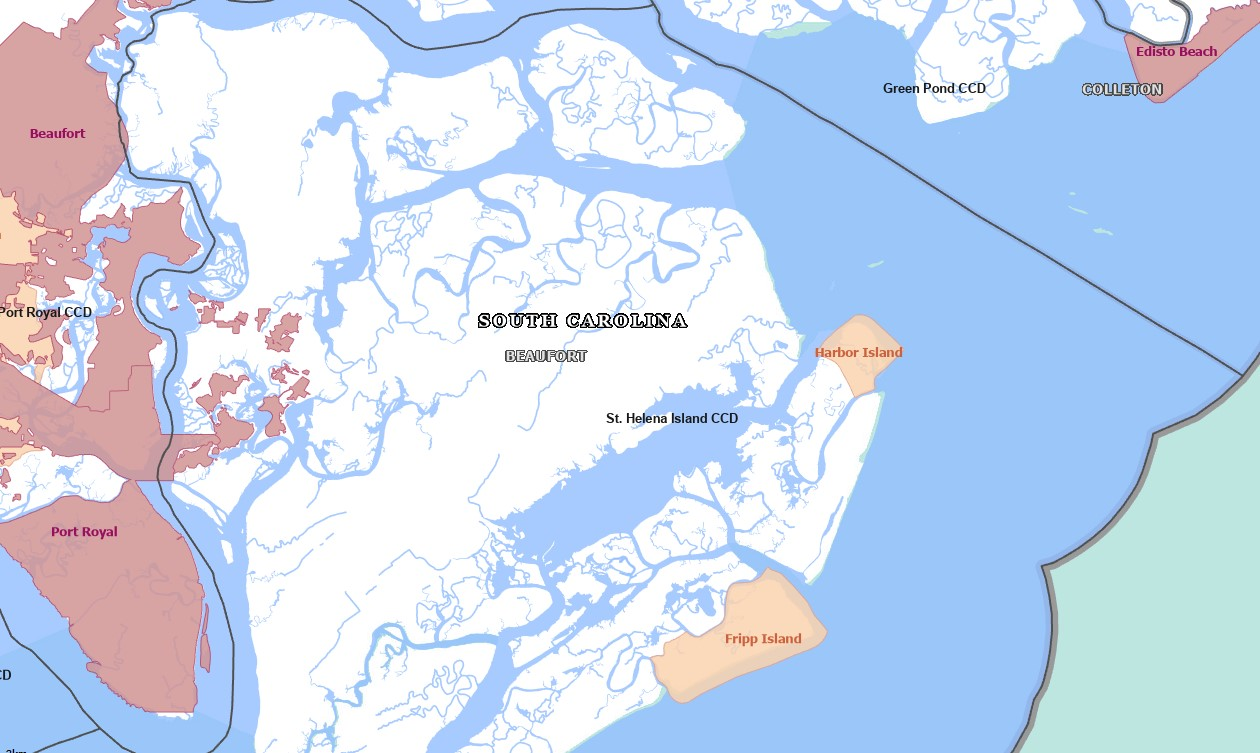
- Map of Fripp Island and Harbor Island CDPs

- Location within South Carolina Location within the United States
- Coordinates: 32°24′16″N 80°26′13″W
- Country: United States
- State: South Carolina
- County: Beaufort

Area
  - Total: 1.52 sq mi (3.93 km^{2})
  - Land: 1.03 sq mi (2.66 km^{2})
  - Water: 0.49 sq mi (1.27 km^{2})
- Elevation: 0 ft (0 m)

Population (2020)
  - Total: 209
  - Density: 203.5/sq mi (78.58/km^{2})
- Time zone: UTC-5 (Eastern (EST))
  - Summer (DST): UTC-4 (EDT)
- ZIP code: 29920
- Area codes: 843 and 854
- FIPS code: 45-32172
- GNIS feature ID: 2812934
- Website: www.harborislandoa.com

Harbor Island is a small residential barrier island located 14 miles (22 km) east of Beaufort, South Carolina. It is one of the Carolina Sea Islands. Most of the island is tidal marsh, though approximately 800 acres (3.2 km^{2}) of upland acreage exists on the northeastern portions. The residential portion of the island was listed as a census-designated place in the 2020 census, with a population of 209. The island is served by U.S. Route 21 (US 21), the only vehicular access route to the island and other nearby islands.

== History ==
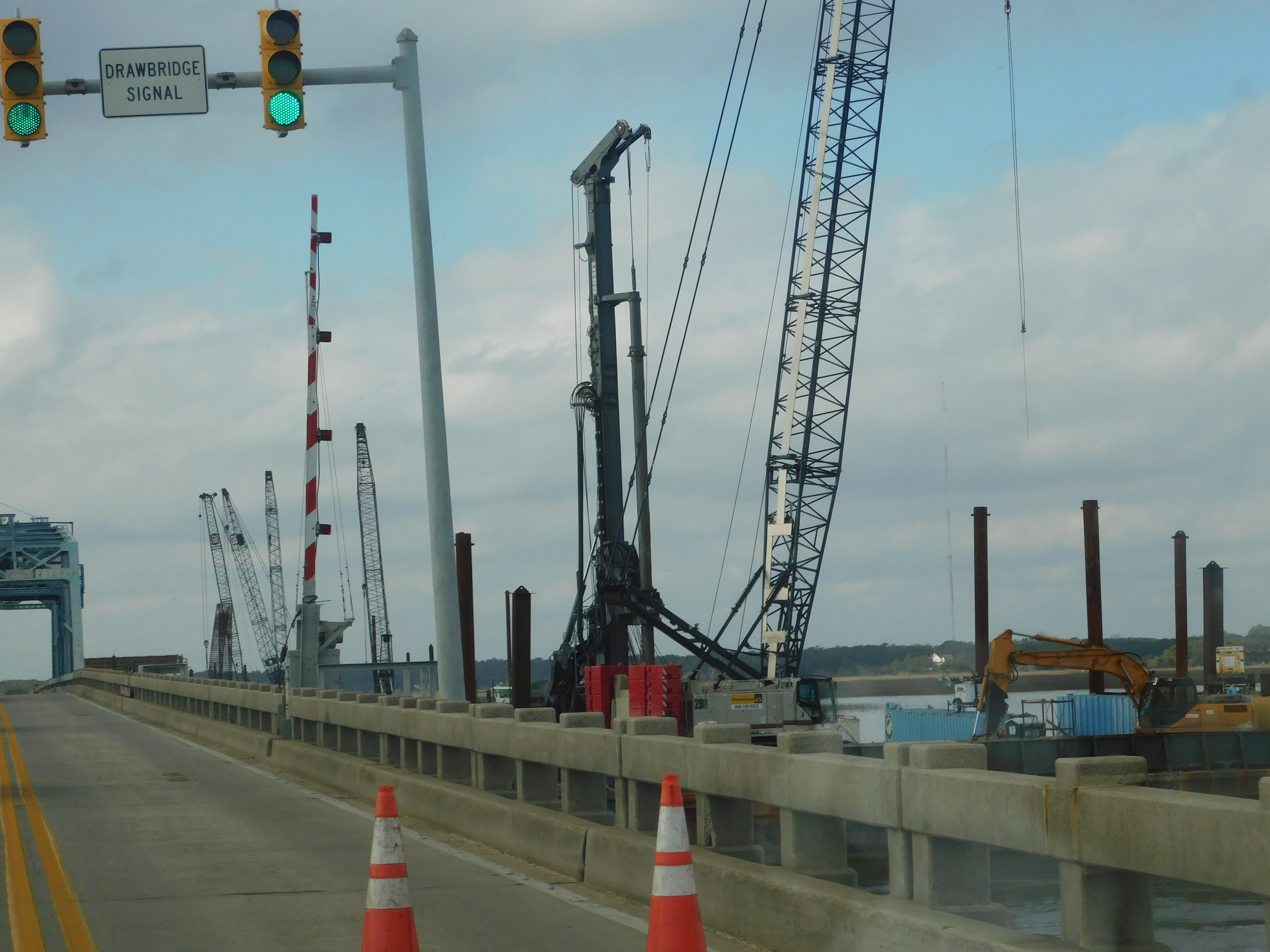
SCDOT replacing the Harbor River Bridge

The island was uninhabited and used primarily as hunting grounds until the 1930s, when US 21 was constructed to connect Saint Helena Island with Hunting Island. Development on Harbor Island remained scarce until The Fripp Company, developers of Fripp Island, purchased most of the land on the island and developed a gated residential and resort community. Small-scale commercial development exists along US 21.

In November 2018, the South Carolina Environmental Law Project filed a lawsuit on behalf of the Harbor Island Owners Association, asking the Beaufort County Circuit Court to order the state to remove seven houses that, through rapid erosion, had ended up in the water on the beach below the mean high water mark. The state was released from the action in 2018, leaving the homeowners and the association as parties to the suit.

The original Harbor River Bridge, a swing-span bridge built in 1939, was narrow and structurally deficient and was replaced with a modern fixed-span bridge to ensure safer and reliable access. The new bridge opened to traffic on April 25, 2021.

== Nature ==
Harbor Island is a certified Community Wildlife Habitat by the National Wildlife Federation.

=== Birds ===
Harbor Island is part of the Beaufort Barrier Islands Important Bird Area.

=== Sea Turtles ===
Harbor Island has a Sea Turtle Nest Protection Program permitted by the South Carolina Department of Natural Resources and run by volunteers.

== Demographics ==
Historical population
Census	Pop.	Note	%±
2020	209		—
U.S. Decennial Census; 2020

The residential portion of the island was listed as a census-designated place in 2020. Per the 2020 census, the population was 209.

=== 2020 census ===
Harbor Island CDP, South Carolina – Racial and ethnic composition Note: the US Census treats Hispanic/Latino as an ethnic category. This table excludes Latinos from the racial categories and assigns them to a separate category. Hispanics/Latinos may be of any race.
Race / Ethnicity (NH = Non-Hispanic)	Pop 2020	% 2020
White alone (NH)	183	87.56%
Black or African American alone (NH)	6	2.87%
Native American or Alaska Native alone (NH)	0	0.00%
Asian alone (NH)	0	0.00%
Pacific Islander alone (NH)	2	0.96%
Other race alone (NH)	4	1.91%
Mixed race or Multiracial (NH)	10	4.78%
Hispanic or Latino (any race)	4	1.91%
Total	209	100.00%
