= Folly Island =

Barrier island of South Carolina, United States

Folly Island, South Carolina
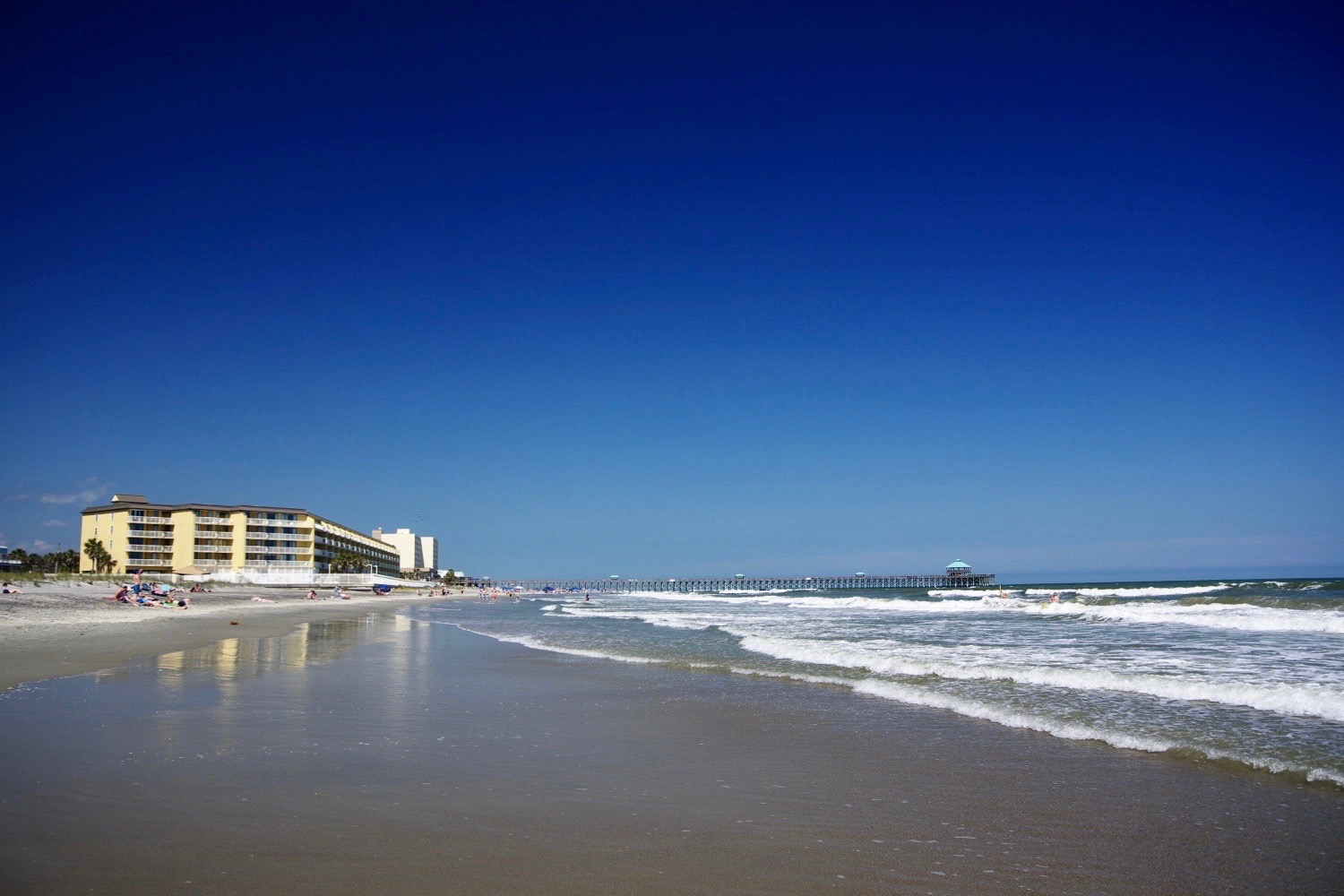
- Folly Beach

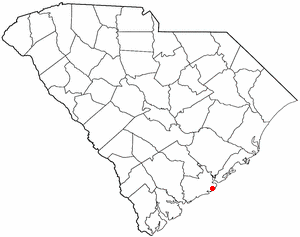
- Location of Folly Beach in South Carolina
- Coordinates: 32°39′38″N 79°55′52″W
- Incorporated (Town): 1938
- Incorporated (City): 1957

Area
  - Total: 18.87 sq mi (48.87 km^{2})
  - Land: 12.51 sq mi (32.39 km^{2})
  - Water: 6.36 sq mi (16.48 km^{2})
- Elevation: 16 ft (5 m)

Population (2010)
  - Total: 37,056
  - Estimate (2019): 2,660
  - Density: 212.7/sq mi (82.12/km^{2})
- Time zone: UTC-5 (EST)
  - Summer (DST): UTC-4 (EDT)
- FIPS code: 45-26035
- GNIS feature ID: 1231287

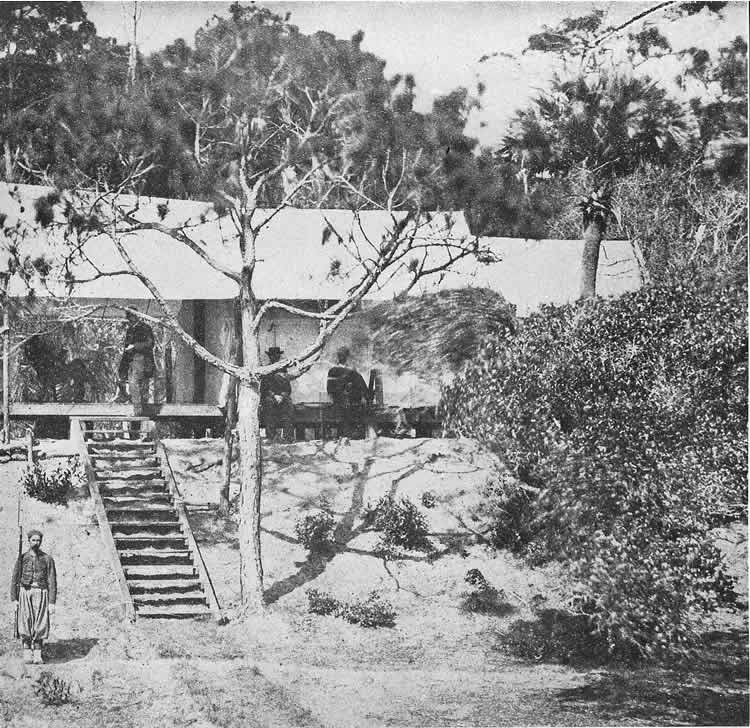
Union occupation forces in July 1863

Folly Island is a barrier island in the Atlantic Ocean near Charleston, South Carolina, United States. It is one of the Sea Islands and is within the boundaries of Charleston County, South Carolina. During the American Civil War, the 7-square-mile (18 km^{2}) island served as a major staging area for troops of the Union Army that were attacking Confederate forces in the Charleston region. The largest settlement on Folly Island is Folly Beach.

== Demographics ==
Historical population
Census	Pop.	Note	%±
2019 (est.)	2,660
U.S. Decennial Census

== History ==
The name Folly comes from an Old English term meaning "dense foliage." When Europeans first landed on the island in the early 1600s, they discovered a Native American tribe called the Bohickets. It is unclear what happened to them after the land was deeded to William Rivers in 1696. Pirates were known to sail along the South Carolina coast and the many inlets, sounds, bays formed by barrier islands and sea islands like Folly Island. Two of the most memorable were Edward Teach, known as Black Beard, and Stede Bonnet.

For a time, Folly Island was known as Coffin Island not because of deaths or burials, but because of its ownership by the Coffin family, plantation owners of Beaufort and Charleston counties. Plague and cholera victims were dropped off on the barrier island, rather than being brought into Charleston Harbor.

The only Civil War-related fighting to occur on the island was on May 10, 1863, when Confederate forces attacked Union forces. Since the Confederates were on a fact-finding mission, the fighting was on a very small scale. Folly was occupied by the Union Army in August 1863 and served as a supply depot and camp for the troops besieging the city of Charleston.

Folly Island remained under Union control for the rest of the war. It was used as the staging area for the Battles of Fort Wagner, which were fought between July and September 1863. Morris Island was the location of Fort Wagner; the Second Battle of Fort Wagner was depicted in the 1989 film Glory.

Bermudian First Sergeant Robert John Simmons of Company B of the 54th Massachusetts Volunteer Infantry Regiment penned a letter from Folly Island shortly before he was mortally wounded at Fort Wagner. The letter was published in the New York Tribune on 23 December 1863.

Folly Island, South Carolina

July 18, 1863;

We are on the march to Fort Wagner, to storm it. We have just completed our successful retreat from James Island; we fought a desperate battle there Thursday morning. Three companies of us, B, H, and K, were out on picket about a good mile in advance of the regiment. We were attacked early in the morning. Our company was in the reserve, when the outposts were attacked by rebel infantry and cavalry. I was sent out by our Captain in command of a squad of men to support the left flank. The bullets fairly rained around us; when I got there the poor fellows were falling down around me, with pitiful groans. Our pickets only numbered about 250 men, attacked by about 900. It is supposed by the line of battle in the distance, that they were supported by reserve of 3,000 men. We had to fire and retreat toward our own encampment. One poor Sergeant of ours was shot down along side of me; several others were wounded near me.

God has protected me through this, my first fiery, leaden trial, and I do give Him the glory, and render my praises unto His holy name. My poor friend [Sergeant Peter] Vogelsang is shot through the lungs; his case is critical, but the doctor says he may probably live. His company suffered very much. Poor good and brave Sergeant (Joseph D.) Wilson of his company [H], after killing four rebels with his bayonet, was shot through the head by the fifth one. Poor fellow! May his noble spirit rest in peace. The General has complimented the Colonel on the gallantry and bravery of his regiment.

In the summer of 1934, composer George Gershwin and author DuBose Heyward, went to Folly Island to work on their American folk opera, Porgy and Bess.

Folly Beach became a township in 1936 and a town in 1951.

Folly Beach is occasionally impacted by hurricanes moving up the Atlantic Coast in the form of wind, rain, and heavy surf which cause beach erosion. Hurricane Irene in 2011 caused severe erosion and forced the closure of the Folly Beach County Park, a popular public beach access point.

The Folly Beach Public Safety and Charleston County Bomb Squad still, to this day, unearths cannonballs after bad storms, most notably Hurricane Matthew. During Matthew 16 cannonballs were discovered in what EOD members called a "loading position". It is likely that these were Civil War era Union cannonballs left behind due to their close proximity to each other and the fact that none had detonated. Most recently one large cannonball, probably Confederate, was found on March 13, 2017, at far northeastern end of the island. The Charleston County EOD is still investigating.

== Education ==
There is one school district in the county, Charleston County School District.

It is zoned to James Island Elementary School, Camp Road Middle School, and James Island Charter High School.
