= Rockville Historic District (Rockville, South Carolina) =

Historic district in South Carolina, United States

- U.S. National Register of Historic Places
- U.S. Historic district
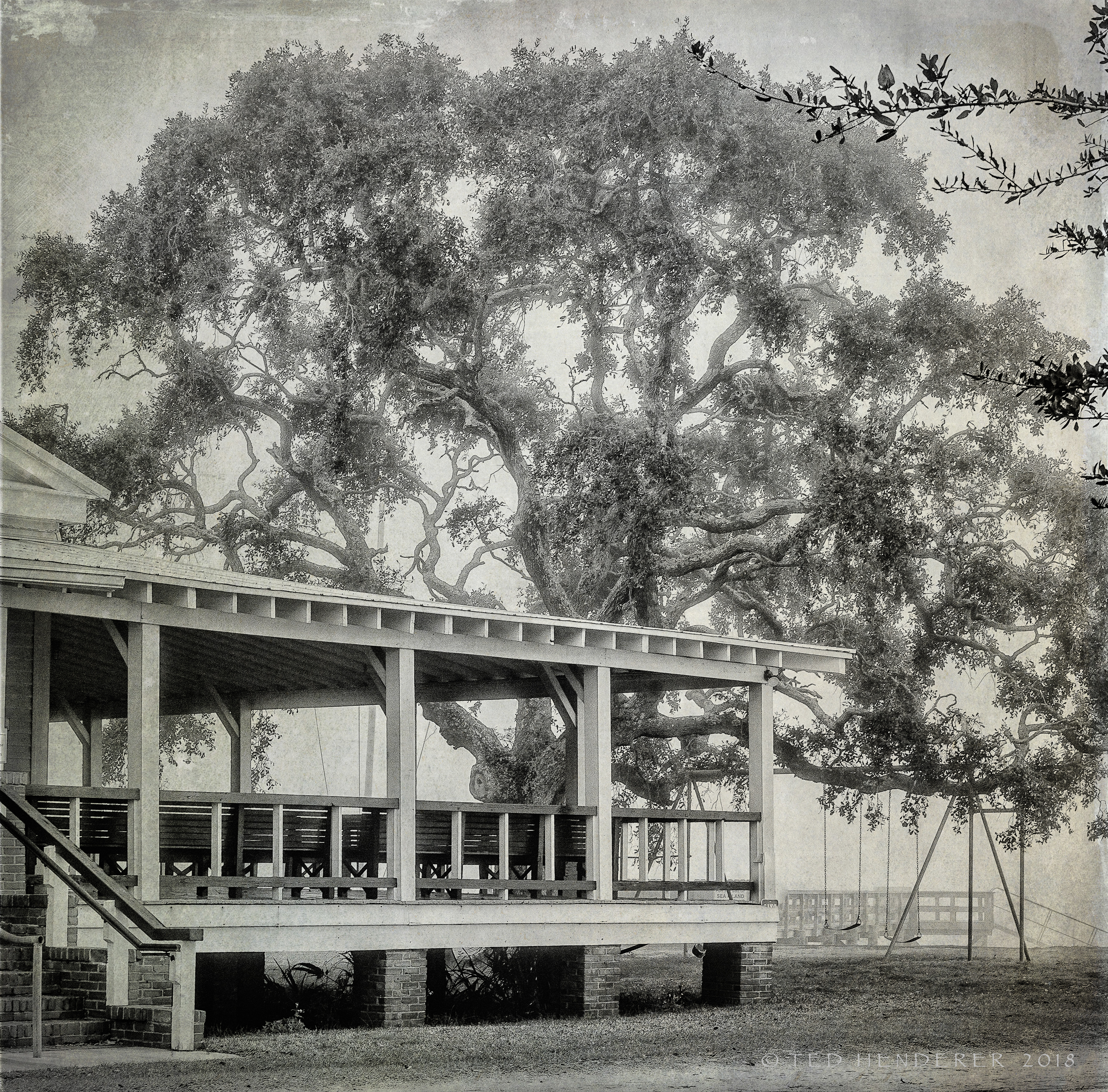
- Sea Island Yacht Club

- Location within South Carolina Location within the United States
- Location: Town of Rockville on the northern bank of Bohicket Creek, Rockville, South Carolina
- Coordinates: 32°36′18″N 80°11′35″W
- Area: 49.6 acres (20.1 ha)
- Built: 1860
- Architectural style: Greek Revival
- NRHP reference No.: 72001202
- Added to NRHP: June 13, 1972

Rockville Historic District is a national historic district located at Rockville, Charleston County, South Carolina. The district encompasses 19 contributing buildings in the town of Rockville. The dwellings reflect Rockville's historic role as a summer resort town. The houses are characterized by spacious porches, raised foundations, and large central hallways designed for summer comfort and relaxation. Located in the district are the Grace Episcopal Church and Wadmalaw Presbyterian Church.

It was listed on the National Register of Historic Places in 1972.

== Gallery ==
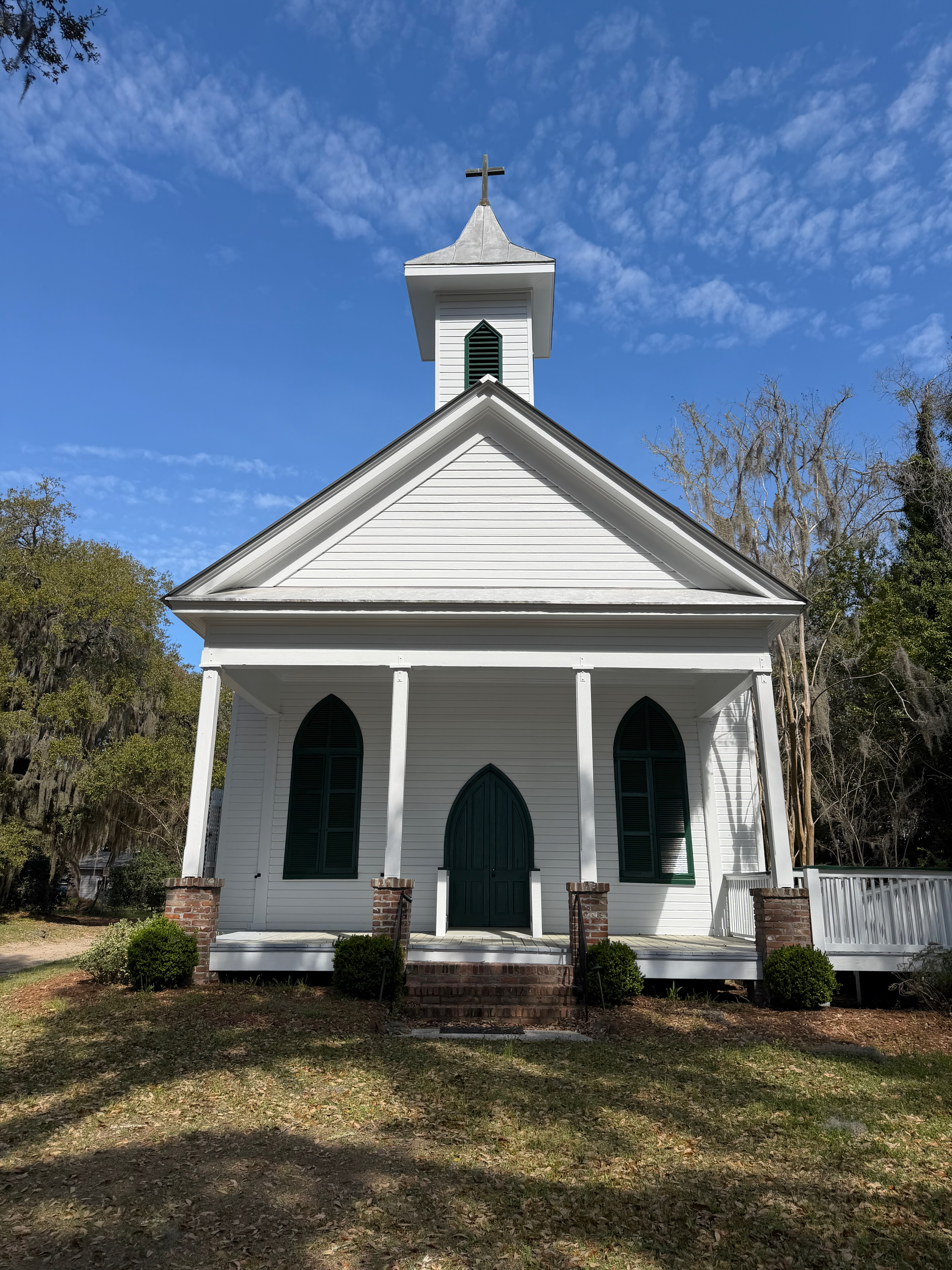
Grace Chapel
