= Horse Island (Rockville, South Carolina) =

Archaeological site in South Carolina, United States

- U.S. National Register of Historic Places
- Nearest city: Rockville, South Carolina
- Area: 1.5 acres (0.61 ha)
- MPS: Historic Resources of the Late Archaic-Early Woodland Period Shell Rings of South Carolina, ca. 1,000-2,200 years B.C
- NRHP reference No.: 70000587
- Added to NRHP: November 10, 1970

Horse Island (38CH14) is a historic mound located near Rockville, Charleston County, South Carolina. It is one of 20 or more prehistoric shell rings located from the central coast of South Carolina to the central coast of Georgia. On average, it measures 156 feet in diameter and stands 4 feet high. The midden is largely composed of oyster shell.

It was listed on the National Register of Historic Places in 1970.
