= South Carolina Highway 362 =

State highway in South Carolina, United States

South Carolina Highway 362

Route information
- Maintained by SCDOT
- Length: 23.060 mi (37.111 km)

Major junctions
- South end: SC 212 in Williams
- SC 217 near Lodge
- North end: US 78 in Bamberg

Location
- Country: United States
- State: South Carolina
- Counties: Colleton, Bamberg

Highway system
- South Carolina State Highway System; Interstate; US; State; Scenic
← SC 358	→ SC 363

South Carolina Highway 362 (SC 362) is a 23.060-mile (37.111 km) state highway in the U.S. state of South Carolina. The highway connects Williams and Bamberg.

== Route description ==
SC 362 begins at an intersection with SC 212 (Joel Padgett Street) in Williams, Colleton County. It travels to the northwest and immediately curves to the west-northwest before leaving the city limits. The highway crosses over Hog Branch before curving to a northwesterly direction. Then, it curves to the north-northwest. It begins a concurrency with SC 217 (Lodge Highway). The two highways head to the west and enter Bamberg County before they split. SC 362 travels to the north before resuming its north-northwestern routing. It passes Little Swamp Cemetery. Then, it curves to the north-northeast and eventually to the northeast. It curves back to the north-northwest and crosses Hurricane Branch and Drawdy Branch. The highway curves to the northwest. Then, it curves to a nearly due north direction before heading back to the north-northwest and northwest. It enters the eastern part of Bamberg, where it meets its northern terminus, an intersection with U.S. Route 78 (US 78; Heritage Highway).

== Major intersections ==
County	Location	mi	km	Destinations	Notes
Colleton	Williams	0.000	0.000	SC 212 (Joel Padgett Street)	Southern terminus
Colleton		4.080	6.566	SC 217 east (Lodge Highway) – Smoaks	Southern end of SC 217 concurrency
Bamberg		4.880	7.854	SC 217 west (War Eagle Road) – Lodge	Northern end of SC 217 concurrency
Bamberg	Bamberg	23.060	37.111	US 78 (Heritage Highway) – Branchville	Northern terminus
1.000 mi = 1.609 km; 1.000 km = 0.621 mi: Concurrency terminus
