= South Carolina Highway 212 =

State highway in South Carolina, United States

South Carolina Highway 212

Route information
- Maintained by SCDOT
- Length: 5.670 mi (9.125 km)
- Existed: 1938–present

Major junctions
- South end: SC 64 near Bells Crossroads
- North end: US 21 near Williams

Location
- Country: United States
- State: South Carolina
- Counties: Colleton

Highway system
- South Carolina State Highway System; Interstate; US; State; Scenic
← SC 211	→ SC 213

South Carolina Highway 212 (SC 212) is a 5.670-mile (9.125 km) primary state highway in the U.S. state of South Carolina. It serves the town of Williams by connecting it with nearby highways.

== Route description ==
SC 212 is a two-lane rural highway that connects the town of Williams between SC 64 and U.S. Route 21 (US 21). Within Williams, it intersects SC 362 at its eastern terminus.

== History ==
Established around 1938 as a new primary routing as a spur from US 21 to Williams. In 1940, it was extended south to its current southern terminus at SC 64. In 1950, the entire route was completely paved.

== Major intersections ==
The entire route is in Colleton County.

Location	mi	km	Destinations	Notes
	0.000	0.000	SC 64 (Lodge Highway) – Lodge, Walterboro	Southern terminus
	0.150	0.241	Sykes Road east (SC 212 Conn. east)	Western terminus of SC 212 Conn.
Williams	3.810	6.132	SC 362 west (Lumber Road)	Eastern terminus of SC 362
	5.670	9.125	US 21 (Low Country Highway) – Yemassee, Branchville	Northern terminus
1.000 mi = 1.609 km; 1.000 km = 0.621 mi

== Bells Crossroads connector route ==
South Carolina Highway 212 Connector
- Location: Bells Crossroads, South Carolina
- Length: 0.130 mi (209 m)

South Carolina Highway 212 Connector (SC 212 Conn.) is a connector route that exists just northwest of Bells Crossroads. It connects SC 64 (Bells Highway) with the SC 212 mainline (Williams Road) just north of SC 212's southern terminus.
