= South Carolina Highway 64 =

State highway in South Carolina

South Carolina Highway 64

Route information
- Maintained by SCDOT
- Length: 73.730 mi (118.657 km)
- Existed: 1926–present

Major junctions
- West end: Dunbarton Boulevard / Technology Drive in Snelling
- US 278 in Barnwell; US 321 in Olar; US 301 near Olar; US 601 in Ehrhardt; US 21 in Bells Crossroads; I-95 in Walterboro; US 15 in Walterboro; US 17 Alt. in Walterboro
- East end: US 17 in Jacksonboro

Location
- Country: United States
- State: South Carolina
- Counties: Barnwell, Bamberg, Colleton

Highway system
- South Carolina State Highway System; Interstate; US; State; Scenic
← SC 63	→ SC 65

South Carolina Highway 64 (SC 64) is a 73.730-mile (118.657 km) primary state highway in the U.S. state of South Carolina. It serves the cities of Barnwell and Walterboro while also providing a direct route to Charleston, via US 17.

== History ==
SC 64 was established around 1926 as a new primary routing from SC 28 near Ellenton, to SC 6/SC 301 near Ruffin. In 1928, SC 64 was extended east to US 17 in Walterboro, replacing part of SC 6. Around 1930, SC 64 was extended east again on new routing to US 78/SC 2 in Summerville. By 1932, SC 64 was extended east again at US 17 in Moncks Corner. In 1939, all sections of SC 64 were paved.

In 1950, SC 64 was extended in both directions: northeast with a concurrency with SC 28 to SC 781 in Beech Island and east replacing SC 179 to Jamestown, then north in concurrency with SC 511, then east to end at US 521, west of Georgetown. This routing was the apex of SC 64's length at a total of over 181 miles (291 km).

Around 1952, SC 64's routing had a major shake-up. Starting in Aiken and Barnwell counties, where the Savannah River Site was established, roughly 23 miles (37 km) of highway was removed in what is now restricted area. A section of SC 64 remained northwest of the Savannah River Site to Beech Island. East of Walterboro, SC 64 was rerouted to US 17, replacing what was US 17, to its current eastern terminus in Jacksonboro; its old alignment was replaced completely by US 17 Alternate (US 17 Alt.). In 1953, the Beech Island section of SC 64 was renumbered as part of SC 125.

By 1955, SC 64 was widened to a divided four-lane highway from the Savannah River Site to Barnwell. In 1973, SC 64 was widened to a divided four-lane with its concurrency with US 301. In 1976, SC 64 was widened to four lanes between Interstate 95 (I-95) to Walterboro. Between 1983 and 1985, SC 64 was placed on a new bypass going north and east of Walterboro, leaving SC 64 Business (SC 64 Bus.) along its old downtown route.

== Major intersections ==
County	Location	mi	km	Destinations	Notes
Barnwell	Snelling	0.000	0.000	Dunbarton Boulevard west / Technology Drive west	Western terminus of SC 64; eastern terminus of Technology Drive; roadway continues as Dunbarton Boulevard.
Barnwell	Barnwell	5.980	9.624	US 278 west (Ellenton Street) – Williston, Aiken, Augusta	Western end of US 278 concurrency
Barnwell	Barnwell	6.240	10.042	SC 70 east (Allen Street) / Dunbarton Boulevard – Denmark	Western terminus of SC 70
Barnwell	Barnwell	6.580	10.589	US 278 east (Jackson Street) – Allendale	Eastern end of US 278 concurrency
Barnwell	Barnwell	7.080	11.394	SC 3 (Marlboro Avenue) – Columbia, Allendale	To Barnwell State Park
Bamberg	Olar	18.470	29.725	US 321 (Dana Street) – Allendale, Fairfax, Denmark, Columbia	
Bamberg		20.900	33.635	US 301 north (Main Highway) – Bamberg	Western end of US 301 concurrency
Bamberg		21.160	34.054	US 301 south (Main Highway) – Allendale, Fairfax	Eastern end of US 301 concurrency
Bamberg	Ehrhardt	31.380	50.501	US 601 (Broxton Bridge Road) – Hampton, Bamberg	
Colleton	Lodge	35.490	57.116	SC 217 east (Lodge Highway) – Smoaks, Ashton	Western terminus of SC 217
Colleton		38.250	61.557	SC 641 west (Confederate Highway)	Eastern terminus of SC 641; to Rivers Bridge State Park
Colleton		43.860	70.586	Sykes Road east (SC 212 Conn. east)	Western terminus of SC 212 Conn.
Colleton		43.990	70.795	SC 212 north (Williams Road) – Williams	Southern terminus of SC 212
Colleton	Bells Crossroads	44.640	71.841	US 21 (Low Country Highway) – Yemassee, Branchville	
Colleton	Walterboro	54.920	88.385	I-95 – Savannah, Florence	I-95 exit 57
Colleton	Walterboro	55.900	89.962	SC 64 Bus. east (Bells Highway)	Western terminus of SC 64 Bus.; to Artisan Center
Colleton	Walterboro	56.610	91.105	US 15 (Jefferies Boulevard) – St. George	
Colleton	Walterboro	58.400	93.986	US 17 Alt. (Wichman Street south / Cottageville Highway east) – Summerville	To Lowcountry Regional Airport and Tuskegee Airmen Monument
Colleton	Walterboro	59.250	95.354	SC 64 Bus. west (Hampton Street) to I-95 south / US 17 Alt. south – Downtown Walterboro, USC Salkehatchie	Eastern terminus of SC 64 Bus.; Bishop Lewis N. Taylor Intersection; SC 64 turns left.
Colleton	Jacksonboro	73.730	118.657	US 17 – Savannah, Charleston	Eastern terminus
1.000 mi = 1.609 km; 1.000 km = 0.621 mi: Concurrency terminus

== Related routes ==
=== Olar alternate route ===
South Carolina Highway 64 Alternate
- Location: Olar, South Carolina
- Existed: 1937–1947

South Carolina Highway 64 Alternate (SC 64 Alt.) was an alternate route that existed in Olar. It was established in July 1937 from SC 64 to SC 5 (now US 321). It used Dana Avenue and 4th Street. In 1947, it was decommissioned.

=== Walterboro business loop ===
South Carolina Highway 64 Business
- Location: Walterboro, South Carolina
- Length: 2.660 mi (4.281 km)
- Existed: 1985–present

South Carolina Highway 64 Business (SC 64 Bus.) is a business route that follows the original mainline route through downtown Walterboro, via Bells Highway, Jeffries Boulevard, Paul Street, Wichman Street, Padgett Loop and Hampton Street.

It was established between 1983 and 1985 when mainline SC 64 was bypassed north and east of Walterboro.

=== Walterboro alternate route ===
South Carolina Highway 64 Alternate
- Location: Walterboro, South Carolina
- Existed: c.1939–1947

South Carolina Highway 64 Alternate (SC 64 Alt.) was an alternate route that existed in the eastern part of Walterboro. It was established by 1940 from U.S. Route 17 (US 17; now SC 64) to SC 64 (now US 17 Alternate). It used Padgett Loop. In 1947, it was decommissioned. Today, it is part of SC 64 Business.

=== South Carolina Highway 64Y ===
South Carolina Highway 64Y
- Location: Round O, South Carolina
- Existed: c.1939–c.1942

South Carolina Highway 64Y (SC 64Y) was a spur route that existed entirely within the northeastern part of Colleton County. By 1940, it was established from an intersection with SC 64 (now US 17 Alternate) in Round O to a point north of the community. By 1943, it was decommissioned and downgraded to a secondary road. Today, it is known as Round O Road.
