= South Carolina Highway 217 =

State highway in South Carolina, United States

South Carolina Highway 217

Route information
- Maintained by SCDOT
- Length: 15.390 mi (24.768 km)

Major junctions
- West end: SC 64 in Lodge
- US 21 in Smoaks
- East end: SC 61 near Canadys

Location
- Country: United States
- State: South Carolina
- Counties: Colleton, Bamberg

Highway system
- South Carolina State Highway System; Interstate; US; State; Scenic
← SC 216	→ SC 219

South Carolina Highway 217 (SC 217) is a 15.390-mile-long (24.768 km) state highway in the U.S. state of South Carolina. The highway connects Lodge and Smoaks with rural areas of Colleton and Bamberg counties.

== Route description ==
SC 217 begins at an intersection with SC 64 (Bells Highway) in Lodge, within Colleton County, where the roadway continues as a local road through town. It travels to the east and crosses over Horse Bay on an unnamed bridge. This bridge marks the Bamberg County line. Almost immediately is a crossing of the Little Salkehatchie River. It begins a concurrency with SC 362 (Hunters Chapel Road). Just before the concurrency ends, the two highways re-enter Colleton County. SC 217 splits off to the east-northeast and crosses Hog Branch. In Smoaks, it crosses over Buckhead Creek and has a one-block concurrency with U.S. Route 21 (US 21; Low Country Highway). It heads to the east and crosses over Bear Branch. The highway curves to the northeast before meeting its eastern terminus, an intersection with SC 61 (Augusta Highway), at a point northwest of Canadys. Here, the roadway continues as Salcro Lane.

== Major intersections ==
County	Location	mi	km	Destinations	Notes
Colleton	Lodge	0.000	0.000	SC 64 (Bells Highway) – Ehrhardt, Walterboro	
Bamberg		3.280	5.279	SC 362 north (Hunters Chapel Road) – Bamberg	Western end of SC 362 concurrency
Colleton		4.080	6.566	SC 362 south (Lumber Road) – Williams	Eastern end of SC 362 concurrency
Colleton	Smoaks	8.500	13.679	US 21 north (Low Country Highway) – Branchville	Western end of US 21 concurrency
Colleton	Smoaks	8.510	13.696	US 21 south (Low Country Highway) – Yemassee	Eastern end of US 21 concurrency
Colleton		15.390	24.768	SC 61 (Augusta Highway) – Canadys	
1.000 mi = 1.609 km; 1.000 km = 0.621 mi: Concurrency terminus
