= List of Zeta Phi Beta chapters =

Zeta Phi Beta is an historically African American collegiate sorority formed at Howard University in 1920.

== Collegiate chapters ==
In the following list, active chapters are indicated in bold and inactive chapters and institutions are in italics.

Chapter	Charter date and range	Location	City	State	Status	Ref.
**Alpha**	January 16, 1920	Howard University	Washington	District of Columbia	Active	
**Beta**	November 3, 1921	Morris Brown College	Atlanta	Georgia	Active	
**Gamma**	November 2, 1921	Morgan State University	Baltimore	Maryland	Active	(Note: Gamma was the second chapter to be established but was named out of Greek alphabet order to match the Gamma chapter of Phi Beta Sigma, its brother institution at Morgan College.)
Delta first	192x ? –19xx ?	San Antonio City	San Antonio	Texas	Active	
**Delta**	August 30, 1956	Texas A&M University–San Antonio	San Antonio	Texas	Active	
Epsilon	1925	New York City	New York City	New York	Inactive	
**Zeta**	March 19, 1945	Alcorn State University	Lorman	Mississippi	Active	
Eta	1922–20xx ?	Temple University	Philadelphia	Pennsylvania	Inactive	(Note: This chapter's charter was revoked by the sorority between July 1, 2012 and June 30, 2020.)
Theta	1923–September 2018	Wiley College	Marshall	Texas	Inactive	(Note: After a report of hazing in September 2018, Wiley College ordered a moratorium on Greek letter organizations.)
Iota first	June 19, 1924 – 1943	University of Cincinnati	Cincinnati	Ohio	Inactive	
**Iota**	1946	Talladega College	Talladega	Alabama	Active	
**Kappa**	March 15, 1946	Johnson C. Smith University	Charlotte	North Carolina	Active	
Lambda first	1923–1937	Nashville Citywide	Nashville	Tennessee	Inactive	(Note: The Lambda chapter originally included both collegiate and graduate members. In 1937, its collegiate members were split between the Fisk University chapter and the Epsilon Alpha chapter at what is now Tennessee State University. Its graduate members formed the Pi Zeta chapter.)
Lambda	1946–20xx ?	Allen University	Columbia	South Carolina	Inactive	(Note: This chapter was suspended by the sorority until April 21, 2025.)
**Mu**	April 16, 1946	Claflin University	Organgeburg	South Carolina	Active	
**Nu**	1925	Virginia Union University	Richmond	Virginia	Active	
Xi first	192x ?–19xx	Wilberforce University	Detroit	Michigan	Inactive	
Xi	1965–xxxx ?	Detroit Citywide	Detroit	Michigan	Inactive	
**Omicron**	1927	Shaw University	Raleigh	North Carolina	Active	
Pi first (see Alpha Iota Zeta)	1927–1928, November 1935–November 1945	Tulsa Citywide	Tulsa	Oklahoma	Inactive	(Note: Pi chapter became the Alpha Iota Zeta graduate chapter in November 1945.)
Pi	May 30, 1946 – 2015	Knoxville College	Knoxville	Tennessee	Inactive	(Note: Knoxville College temporarily closed in 2015; the sorority also went defunct.)
Rho first (see **Beta Theta Zeta**)	December 17, 1927 – 1944	Norfolk State University ?	Norfolk	Virginia	Reassigned	(Note: The Rho Chapter was re-organized as the Beta Theta Zeta graduate chapter in 1944.)
Rho second (see Alpha Kappa)	1946–19xx ?	Kansas State Teachers College of Pittsburg	Pittsburg	Kansas	Reassigned	
Rho third	1955–1988	Bishop College	Marshall	Texas	Reassigned	(Note: Bishop College moved to Dallas in 1961 and closed in 1988. The chapter moved with the institution but was rechartered as a citywide chapter.)
**Sigma**	April 28, 1928	Livingstone College	Salisbury	North Carolina	Active	
**Tau**	March 15, 1947	Philander Smith College	Little Rock	Arkansas	Active	
**Upsilon**	September 30, 1961	Delaware State University	Dover	Delaware	Active	
**Phi**	1929	Virginia State University	Petersburg	Virginia	Active	
**Chi**	October 3, 1953	Cheyney University of Pennsylvania	Cheyney	Pennsylvania	Active	
**Psi**	January 17, 1931	Clark Atlanta University	Atlanta	Georgia	Active	(Note: This chapter was suspended by the sorority until September 27, 2023.)
**Omega**	May 8, 1948	Winston-Salem State University	Winston-Salem	North Carolina	Active	
**Alpha Alpha**	1931	Chicago Areawide	Chicago	Illinois	Active	
**Beta Alpha**	February 13, 1932	Southern University	Baton Rouge	Louisiana	Active	
**Gamma Alpha**	May 14, 1932	Florida A&M University	Tallahassee	Florida	Active	
**Delta Alpha**	1945–1950, 1956	Texas College	Tyler	Texas	Active	
**Epsilon Alpha**	April 15, 1933	Tennessee State University	Nashville	Tennessee	Active	
**Zeta Alpha**	July 16, 1934	North Carolina A&T State University	Greensboro	North Carolina	Active	
**Eta Alpha**	193x ?	Kentucky State University	Frankfort	Kentucky	Active	
**Theta Alpha**	October 15, 1933	Boston Metropolitan	Boston	Massachusetts	Active	
**Iota Alpha**	April 2, 1942	Florida Memorial University	Miami Gardens	Florida	Active	
**Kappa Alpha**	March 23, 1937	University of the District of Columbia	Washington	District of Columbia	Active	(Note: The Kappa Alpha chapter was established at Miners Teachers College, one of four schools which now make up the University of the District of Columbia.)
Lambda Alpha	December 11, 1937 – 20xx ?	Langston University	Langston	Oklahoma	Inactive	(Note: This chapter was formed as both a collegiate and graduate chapter.) (Note: This chapter was suspended by the sorority until March 11, 2025.)
Mu Alpha	193x ?–19xx ?	Bluefield State University	Bluefield	West Virginia	Inactive	
**Nu Alpha**	March 26, 1938	Texas Southern University	Houston	Texas	Active	
Xi Alpha	1937–xxxx ?	Occidental College	Los Angeles	California	Inactive	
Omicron Alpha first (see **Mu Nu**)	April 15, 1939 – 19xx ?	Wichita State University and Friends University	Wichita	Kansas	Inactive	(Note: Chapter was reestablished as Mu Nu chapter in 1987.)
Omicron Alpha	June 14, 1965 – 2021 ?	Queens College and St. John's University	Queens	New York	Inactive	(Note: This chapter originally included York College. That campus is now covered by the Phi Phi chapter.)
**Pi Alpha**	April 1939	LeMoyne–Owen College	Memphis	Tennessee	Active	
**Rho Alpha**	February 26, 1947	Hampton University	Hampton	Virginia	Active	
**Sigma Alpha**	June 5, 1971	Kent State University	Kent	Ohio	Active	
**Tau Alpha**	December 27, 1939	University of Nebraska Omaha	Omaha	Nebraska	Active	
**Upsilon Alpha**	March 4, 1940	Huston–Tillotson University	Austin	Texas	Active	
Phi Alpha	19xx ?–20xx ?	Saint Louis, MO	St. Louis	Missouri	Inactive	
**Chi Alpha**	1954	Rider University	Lawrence Township	New Jersey	Active	(Note: Chi Alpha was established as a Princeton/Trenton area city chapter and became a campus chapter later.)
**Psi Alpha**	February 8, 1941	South Carolina State University	Orangeburg	South Carolina	Active	
**Omega Alpha**	194x ?	Wayne State University	Detroit	Michigan	Active	
**Alpha Beta**	January 1942	Dillard University	New Orleans	Louisiana	Active	
Beta Beta first (see **Omega Theta**)	February 25, 1979	University of Kansas	Lawrence	Kansas	Active	(Note: Chapter reformed as Omega Theta chapter.)
**Beta Beta**	1952	University of Arkansas at Pine Bluff	Pine Bluff	Arkansas	Active	
Gamma Beta	1942–2012	University of California, Berkeley	Berkeley	California	Inactive	(Note: This was chartered as a two-campus chapter, covering both University of California, Berkeley and San Francisco State University. In 1983, the latter separated as Nu Mu chapter.)
**Delta Beta**	April 4, 1946	Fort Valley State University	Fort Valley	Georgia	Active	
**Epsilon Beta**	1947	Alabama State University	Montgomery	Alabama	Active	
**Zeta Beta**	February 13, 1932	Southern University at New Orleans	New Orleans	Louisiana	Active	
Eta Beta	May 31, 1947 – 19xx ?; 1963–20xx ?	University of Maryland Eastern Shore	Princess Anne	Maryland	Inactive	(Note: This chapter was suspended by the sorority until October 21, 2026.)
**Theta Beta**	April 15, 1948	Tuskegee University	Tuskegee	Alabama	Active	
**Iota Beta**	1948	West Virginia State University	Institute	West Virginia	Active	
Kappa Beta	1970–20xx ?	Benedict College	Columbia	South Carolina	Inactive	(Note: This chapter was suspended by the sorority until March 21, 2024.)
Lambda Beta	1948–20xx ?	Jackson State University	Jackson	Mississippi	Inactive	(Note: This chapter was suspended by the sorority until February 11, 2025.)
Mu Beta	1948–20xx ?	Bethune–Cookman University	Daytona Beach	Florida	Inactive	(Note: This chapter was suspended by the sorority until October 1, 2026.)
**Nu Beta**	1950	Tougaloo College	Tougaloo	Mississippi	Active	
**Xi Beta**	1950	Lincoln University	Jefferson City	Missiouri	Active	
**Omicron Beta**	1950	Brooklyn Metropolitan	Brooklyn	New York	Active	
**Pi Beta**	1950	Albany State University	Albany	Georgia	Active	
**Rho Beta**	November 1950	Savannah State University	Savannah	Georgia	Active	
**Sigma Beta**	March 1, 1951	Alabama A&M University	Normal	Alabama	Active	
**Tau Beta**	1973	Paul Quinn College	Dallas	Texas	Active	
**Phi Beta**	October 11, 1951	St. Augustine's University	Raleigh	North Carolina	Active	
Chi Beta	February 22, 1952 – 20xx ?	Central State University	Wilberforce	Ohio	Inactive	
**Psi Beta**	May 7, 1952	Grambling State University	Grambling	Louisiana	Active	
**Omega Beta**	May 10, 1952	Fayetteville State University	Fayetteville	North Carolina	Active	
**Alpha Gamma**	1953	Elizabeth City State University	Elizabeth City	North Carolina	Active	
Beta Gamma first	February 13, 1960 – xxxx ?	Oklahoma City Citywide	Oklahoma City	Oklahoma	Inactive	
Beta Gamma	19xx ? – 201x ?	University of Central Oklahoma	Edmond	Oklahoma	Inactive	(Note: This chapter was suspended by the sorority and had not satisfied all of the conditions for its reinstatement as of December 5, 2022.)
**Gamma Gamma**	April 29, 1960	North Carolina Central University	Durham	North Carolina	Active	
Delta Gamma	196x ?–xxxx ?				Inactive	
**Epsilon Gamma**	1962	Stillman College	Tuscaloosa	Alabama	Active	
**Zeta Gamma**	December 1, 1962	Norfolk State University	Norfolk	Virginia	Active	
Eta Gamma	196x ?–xxxx ?	University of Tulsa	Tulsa	Oklahoma	Inactive	
Theta Gamma	196x ?–xxxx ?	Barber–Scotia College	Concord	North Carolina	Inactive	
**Iota Gamma**	May 25, 1965	Rust College	Holly Springs	Mississippi	Active	
**Kappa Gamma**	November 1966	Fisk University	Old Hickory	Tennessee	Active	
**Lambda Gamma**	April 29, 1969	McNeese State University	Lake Charles	Louisiana	Active	
**Mu Gamma**	1969	Edward Waters University	Jacksonville	Florida	Active	
**Nu Gamma**	1968	Coppin State University	Baltimore	Maryland	Active	
**Xi Gamma**	1968	Ohio State University	Columbus	Ohio	Active	
Omicron Gamma	1968–20xx ?	Bowie State University	Prince George's County	Maryland	Inactive	(Note: This chapter was suspended by the sorority until October 28, 2025.)
Pi Gamma	196x ?–xxxx ?	Northwest Central Oklahoma		Oklahoma	Inactive	
**Rho Gamma**	May 1968	University of Memphis	Memphis	Tennessee	Active	
**Sigma Gamma**	September 1968	Houston Citywide	Houston	Texas	Active	
**Tau Gamma**	November 21, 1968	Lane College	Jackson	Tennessee	Active	
Upsilon Gamma	196x ?–xxxx ?	Shreveport Citywide	Shreveport	Louisiana	Inactive	
**Phi Gamma**	September 15, 1960	Michigan State University	East Lansing	Michigan	Active	
**Chi Gamma**	1969	Bennett College	Greensboro	North Carolina	Active	
Psi Gamma	19xx ?–20xx ?	Mississippi Valley State University	Mississippi Valley State	Mississippi	Inactive	(Note: This chapter was suspended by the sorority until March 12, 2025.)
Omega Gamma	1969–20xx ?	Prairie View A&M University	Prairie View	Texas	Inactive	(Note: This chapter was suspended by the sorority until October 1, 2026.)
Alpha Delta	19xx ?–xxxx ?	Selma University	Selma	Alabama	Inactive	
**Beta Delta**	1970	Xavier University	New Orleans	Louisiana	Active	
**Gamma Delta**	May 16, 1970	University of Michigan	Ann Arbor	Michigan	Active	
**Delta Delta**	1969	Lincoln University	Lincoln University	Pennsylvania	Active	
**Epsilon Delta**	December 4, 1971	Lamar University	Beaumont	Texas	Active	
**Zeta Delta**	January 31, 1972	Jarvis Christian University	Hawkins	Texas	Active	
**Eta Delta**	May 1, 1971	Northern Illinois University	DeKalb	Illinois	Active	
**Theta Delta**	1971	Wayne State University	Detroit	Michigan	Active	
**Iota Delta**	1971	Miles College	Birmingham	Alabama	Active	
**Kappa Delta**	1971	Paine College	Augusta	Georgia	Active	
**Lambda Delta**	1971	University of Tennessee at Chattanooga	Chattanooga	Tennessee	Active	
Mu Delta	197x ?–20xx ?	Southern Illinois University Carbondale	Carbondale	Illinois	Inactive	(Note: This chapter was suspended by the sorority until March 12, 2025.)
**Nu Delta**	April 15, 1972	University of Illinois	Champaign	Illinois	Active	
**Xi Delta**	December 3, 1971	University of Pittsburgh	Pittsburgh	Pennsylvania	Active	
**Omicron Delta**	1975	Eastern Illinois University	Charleston	Illinois	Active	
**Pi Delta**	February 5, 1972	Eastern Michigan University	Ypsilanti	Michigan	Active	
Rho Delta	1972–198x ?, 1995–20xx ?	University of North Texas	Denton	Texas	Inactive	(Note: This chapter was suspended by the sorority until December 6, 2029)
**Sigma Delta**	September 19, 1972	University of Miami	Coral Gables	Florida	Active	
Tau Delta	1972–20xx ?	Western Michigan University	Kalamazoo	Michigan	Inactive	
Upsilon Delta	197x ?–xxxx ?	Southeastern Oklahoma State University	Durant, Oklahoma	Oklahoma	Inactive	
**Phi Delta**	May 6, 1973	Bradley University	Peoria	Illinois	Active	
**Chi Delta**	February 4, 1974	Texas Woman's University	Denton	Texas	Active	
**Psi Delta**	January 19, 1974	Stephen F. Austin State University	Nacogdoches	Texas	Active	
**Omega Delta**	January 20, 1972	Western Kentucky University	Bowling Green	Kentucky	Active	
**Alpha Epsilon**	1973	East Texas A&M University	Commerce	Texas	Active	(Note: Texas A&M University at Commerce changed its name to East Texas A&M University on 7 November 2024.)
Beta Epsilon	1974–201x ?	Ohio University	Athens	Ohio	Inactive	
Gamma Epsilon	197x ?–xxxx ?	Wilberforce University	Wilberforce	Ohio	Inactive	
**Delta Epsilon**	April 23, 1973	Indiana University Bloomington	Bloomington	Indiana	Active	
Epsilon Epsilon	197x ?–xxxx ?				Inactive	
**Zeta Epsilon**	1973–2010, 2016	PennWest California	California	Pennsylvania	Active	
**Eta Epsilon**	1973	University of Maryland, College Park	College Park	Maryland	Active	
**Theta Epsilon**	197x ?	Voorhees College	Denmark	South Carolina	Active	
**Iota Epsilon**	March 30, 1973	University of Dayton	Dayton	Ohio	Active	
**Kappa Epsilon**	1974	Columbus State University	Columbus	Georgia	Active	
Lambda Epsilon	June 3, 1973 – 20xx ?	Illinois State University	Normal	Illinois	Inactive	(Note: This chapter was suspended by the sorority until May 12, 2023.)
**Mu Epsilon**	April 3, 1974	University of Florida	Gainesville	Florida	Active	
Nu Epsilon	1974–19xx?	Loyola Marymount University	Los Angeles	California	Inactive	
**Xi Epsilon**	1974	Northwestern State University	Natchitoches	Louisiana	Active	
**Omicron Epsilon**	April 16, 1974	College of New Jersey	Ewing Township,	New Jersey	Active	
**Pi Epsilon**	October 10, 1974	University of Tennessee	Knoxville	Tennessee	Active	
**Rho Epsilon**	May 2, 1975	Louisiana State University	Baton Rouge	Louisiana	Active	
**Sigma Epsilon**	1974	University of Central Florida	Orlando	Florida	Active	
Tau Epsilon	197x ?–xxxx ?	University of Redlands	Redlands	California	Inactive	
**Upsilon Epsilon**	February 14, 1975	University of Akron	Akron	Ohio	Active	
**Phi Epsilon**	January 27, 1975	University of Houston	Houston	Texas	Active	
Chi Epsilon	March 15, 1975 – xxxx ?	University of Georgia	Athens	Georgia	Inactive	
**Psi Epsilon**	May 25, 1974	Bowling Green State University	Bowling Green	Ohio	Active	
Omega Epsilon	197x ?–xxxx ?				Inactive	
**Alpha Eta**	1976	University of South Florida	Tampa	Florida	Active	
**Beta Eta**	April 12, 1975	University of Cincinnati	Cincinnati	Ohio	Active	
**Gamma Eta**	April 4, 1978	University of Central Arkansas	Conway	Arkansas	Active	
**Delta Eta**	1976	California State University, Long Beach	Long Beach	California	Active	
Epsilon Eta	1976–201x ?	Shippensburg University of Pennsylvania	Shippensburg	Pennsylvania	Inactive	
Zeta Eta	197x ?–xxxx ?				Inactive	
Eta Eta	197x ?–xxxx ?	Youngstown State University	Youngstown	Ohio	Inactive	
Theta Eta	197x ?–xxxx ?	University of Maryland, Baltimore County	Baltimore County	Maryland	Inactive	
**Iota Eta**	May 4, 1974	University of Alabama	Tuscaloosa	Alabama	Active	
**Kappa Eta**	May 4, 1976	University of Arkansas, Monticello	Monticello	Arkansas	Active	
**Lambda Eta**	April 30, 1976	Sam Houston State University	Huntsville	Texas	Active	
**Mu Eta**	July 26, 1976	Pennsylvania State University	University Park	Pennsylvania	Active	
**Nu Eta**	1976–19xx ?, 1999	University of West Florida	Pensacola	Florida	Active	
**Xi Eta**	1976	Henderson State University	Arkadelphia	Arkansas	Active	
**Omicron Eta**	1976	University of Texas at Arlington	Arlington	Texas	Active	
**Pi Eta**	1976	Florida Atlantic University	Boca Raton	Florida	Active	
**Rho Eta**	April 20, 1976	California State University, Los Angeles	Los Angeles	California	Active	
Sigma Eta	197x ?–xxxx ?	LaGrange College	LaGrange	Georgia	Inactive	
Tau Eta	November 13, 1976 – 2019 ?	University of Mississippi	Oxford	Mississippi	Inactive	
Upsilon Eta	1977–xxxx ?	Pace University	New York City	New York	Inactive	
Phi Eta	1977–xxxx ?	East Central University	Ada	Oklahoma	Inactive	
Chi Eta	197x ?–xxxx ?				Inactive	
**Psi Eta**	January 7, 1977	University of South Carolina	Columbia	South Carolina	Active	
**Omega Eta**	January 7, 1977	University of Louisiana at Lafayette	Lafayette	Louisiana	Active	
Alpha Theta	1977–20xx ?	Valdosta State University	Valdosta	Georgia	Inactive	(Note: Chapter formed by absorbing the local Archonian Club, established in 1976.)
**Beta Theta**	February 3, 1977	University of Louisiana at Monroe	Monroe	Louisiana	Active	
**Gamma Theta**	1977	University of Alabama at Birmingham	Birmingham	Alabama	Active	
**Delta Theta**	June 12, 1977	University of Louisville	Louisville	Kentucky	Active	
**Epsilon Theta**	1977	Mississippi State University	Mississippi State	Mississippi	Active	
Zeta Theta	197x ?–xxxx ?				Inactive	
**Eta Theta**	1977	Virginia Commonwealth University	Richmond	Virginia	Active	
**Theta Theta**	March 22, 1977	Winthrop University	Rock Hill	South Carolina	Active	
**Iota Theta**	1975	Indiana State University	Terre Haute	Indiana	Active	
Kappa Theta	1976–xxxx ?	Ferris State University	Big Rapids	Michigan	Inactive	
**Lambda Theta**	1977	University of Southern Mississippi	Hattiesburg	Mississippi	Active	
**Mu Theta**	September 17, 1977	Middle Tennessee State University	Murfreesboro	Tennessee	Active	
**Nu Theta**	1978–xxxx ?, 2009	University of Connecticut	Wilmington	Connecticut	Active	
**Xi Theta**	1978	University of Arkansas at Little Rock	Little Rock	Arkansas	Active	
**Omicron Theta**	February 18, 1978	University of Texas at Austin	Austin	Texas	Active	
**Pi Theta**	December 10, 1977	Morris College	Sumter	South Carolina	Active	
**Rho Theta**	December 21, 1977	Rowan University	Glassboro	New Jersey	Active	
Sigma Theta (see **Tau Xi**)	1977–xxxx ?	University of West Alabama	Livingston	Alabama	Inactive	(Note: This chapter was reformed as Tau Xi chapter in 1991.)
**Tau Theta**	April 2, 1978	University of Virginia	Charlottesville	Virginia	Active	
Upsilon Theta	197x ?–xxxx ?				Inactive	
**Phi Theta**	April 4, 1978	University of Arkansas	Fayetteville	Arkansas	Active	
**Chi Theta**	February 3, 1979	University of Delaware	Newark	Delaware	Active	
**Psi Theta**	April 15, 1978	Cleveland State University	Cleveland	Ohio	Active	
**Omega Theta** (see Beta Beta first)	February 25, 1979	University of Kansas	Lawrence	Kansas	Active	
**Alpha Iota**	October 5, 1985	California State University, Fresno	Fresno	California	Active	
**Beta Iota**	January 13, 1979 – 1983, 1993	Spelman College	Atlanta	Georgia	Active	
Gamma Iota	197x ?–xxxx ?	Bucknell University	Lewisburg, Pennsylvania	Pennsylvania	Inactive	
**Delta Iota**	November 25, 1978	University of Tennessee at Martin	Martin	Tennessee	Active	
Epsilon Iota	197x ?–xxxx ?	Lewis University	Romeoville	Illinois	Inactive	
**Zeta Iota**	April 21, 1979	State University of New York at Geneseo	Geneseo	New York	Active	
**Eta Iota**	1979	University of Wisconsin–Madison	Madison	Wisconsin	Active	
**Theta Iota**	January 1979	University of Northern Colorado	Greeley	Colorado	Active	
**Kappa Iota**	September 19, 1979	Arizona State University	Tempe	Arizona	Active	
**Lambda Iota**	May 11, 1979	Frostburg State University	Frostburg	Maryland	Active	
**Mu Iota**	May 19, 1979	University of Pennsylvania	Philadelphia	Pennsylvania	Active	
**Nu Iota**	1979	Baylor University	Waco	Texas	Active	
**Xi Iota**	September 22, 1979	Montclair State University	Montclair	New Jersey	Active	
**Omicron Iota**	November 19, 1979	University of Central Missouri	Warrensburg	Missiouri	Active	
**Pi Iota**	December 8, 1979	Syracuse University	Syracuse	New York	Active	
Rho Iota (see **Iota Omincron**)	1989–19xx ?	Tulane University	New Orleans	Louisiana	Merged	
Sigma Iota	19xx ?–xxxx ?				Inactive	
Tau Iota	1980–xxxx ?	University of Texas at El Paso	El Paso	Texas	Inactive	
**Upsilon Iota**	January 5, 1980 – xxxx ?; January 26, 2015	University of New Orleans	New Orleans	Louisiana	Active	
**Phi Iota**	February 1, 1980	University of Nebraska–Lincoln	Lincoln	Nebraska	Active	
**Chi Iota**	March 31, 1981	College of Charleston	Charleston	South Carolina	Active	
Psi Iota	19xx ?–xxxx ?				Inactive	
**Omega Iota**	November 18, 1978–20xx ? March 2025	University of North Carolina at Chapel Hill	Chapel Hill	North Carolina	Active	(Note: This chapter was suspended by the sorority until April 2, 2023.)
Alpha Kappa (see Rho second)	19xx ?–xxxx ?	Pittsburg State University	Pittsburg, Kansas	Kansas	Inactive	
Beta Kappa	19xx ?–xxxx ?				Inactive	
**Gamma Kappa**	May 17, 1980	Rutgers University–New Brunswick	New Brunswick and Piscataway	New Jersey	Active	
**Delta Kappa**	October 9, 1979	Southern Illinois University Edwardsville	Edwardsville	Illinois	Active	
**Epsilon Kappa**	April 27, 1980	Purdue University	West Lafayette	Indiana	Active	
**Zeta Kappa**	March 1, 1980	LIU Post	Brookville	New York	Active	
**Eta Kappa**	May 10, 1980	State University of New York at Old Westbury	Long Island	New York	Active	
**Theta Kappa**	1984	Stony Brook University	Stony Brook	New York	Active	
Iota Kappa	198x ?–xxxx ?				Inactive	
Kappa Kappa	198x ?–xxxx ?				Inactive	
Lambda Kappa	198x ?–xxxx ?				Inactive	
Mu Kappa	May 3, 1980 – 2025	Indiana University of Pennsylvania	Indiana	Pennsylvania	Active	
Nu Kappa	198x ?–xxxx ?				Inactive	
**Xi Kappa**	October 18, 1980	San Diego State University	San Diego	California	Active	
Omicron Kappa	1978–20xx ?	Western Illinois University	Macomb	Illinois	Inactive	
Pi Kappa	December 2, 1980 – 2018 ?	University of Iowa	Iowa City	Iowa	Inactive	
**Rho Kappa**	1981	Florida State University	Tallahassee	Florida	Active	
**Sigma Kappa**	March 29, 1980	Central Michigan University	Mount Pleasant	Michigan	Active	
Tau Kappa	198x ?–xxxx ?	University of Colorado		Colorado	Inactive	
**Upsilon Kappa**	April 1, 1978	California State University, Fullerton	Fullerton	California	Active	
Phi Kappa	198x ?–xxxx ?				Inactive	
**Chi Kappa**	March 31, 1981	University of Missouri	Columbia	Missouri	Active	
**Psi Kappa**	1995	Delta State University	Cleveland	Mississippi	Active	
**Omega Kappa**	March 31, 1981	California State University, Northridge	Los Angeles	California	Active	
Alpha Lambda	1981–xxxx ?	Adelphi University	Garden City	New York	Inactive	(Note: Alpha Lambda was originally the Nassau County Metropolitan chapter covering Adelphi University, Hofstra University and the SUNY Agricultural and Technical University at Farmingdale.)
**Beta Lambda**	April 18, 1981	University of Houston–Downtown	Houston	Texas	Active	
**Gamma Lambda**	1981	University of Southern California	Los Angeles	California	Active	
**Delta Lambda**	February 26, 1972	University of South Alabama	Mobile	Alabama	Active	
**Epsilon Lambda**	1975	Louisiana Tech University	Ruston	Louisiana	Active	
**Zeta Lambda**	1981	Kean University	Plainfield	New Jersey	Active	
**Eta Lambda**	1981	Southeastern Louisiana University	Hammond	Louisiana	Active	
**Theta Lambda**	October 20, 1981	West Chester University	Chester	Pennsylvania	Active	
Iota Lambda	1981–20xx ?	Charleston Southern University	North Charleston	South Carolina	Inactive	
**Kappa Lambda**	1982	University of Tampa	Tampa	Florida	Active	
**Lambda Lambda**	1981	University of Wisconsin–Milwaukee and Marquette University	Milwaukee	Wisconsin	Active	
**Mu Lambda**	November 20, 1982	Eastern Kentucky University	Richmond	Kentucky	Active	
**Nu Lambda**	January 23, 1982	University of California, Los Angeles	Los Angeles	California	Active	
**Xi Lambda**	April 10, 1982	College of William & Mary	Williamsburg	Virginia	Active	
Omicron Lambda	198x ?–xxxx ?				Inactive	
**Pi Lambda**	March 4, 1982	University of North Carolina at Pembroke	Pembroke	North Carolina	Active	
**Rho Lambda**	1982	Auburn University at Montgomery	Montgomery	Alabama	Active	
Sigma Lamba	198x ?–xxxx ?	Saint Paul's College	Lawrenceville	Virginia	Inactive	(Note: St. Paul's College closed in 2013.)
**Tau Lambda**	May 22, 1982	Radford University	Radford	Virginia	Active	
Upsilon Lambda	1982–20xx ?	Virginia Tech	Blacksburg	Virginia	Inactive	(Note: This chapter was suspended by the sorority until May 17, 2023.)
**Phi Lambda**	198x ?–xxxx ?	Texas A&M University–Corpus Christi	Corpus Christi	Texas	Active	
**Chi Lambda**	1983	Rochester Metro (University of Rochester, Rochester Institute of Technology, and SUNY Brockport)	Rochester	New York	Active	
**Psi Lambda**	1983	Rutgers University–Newark and New Jersey Institute of Technology	Newark	New Jersey	Active	
Omega Lambda	198x ?–xxxx ?	Westchester Countywide	Westchester County	New York	Inactive	
**Alpha Mu**	August 23, 1982 – xxxx ?; January 22, 2010	Christian Brothers University	Memphis	Tennessee	Active	
Beta Nu	198x ?–20xx ?	Fairleigh Dickinson University	Teaneck	New Jersey	Inactive	
Gamma Mu	198x ?–xxxx ?				Inactive	
**Delta Mu**	November 13, 1982	Lander University	Greenwood	South Carolina	Active	
**Epsilon Mu**	December 4, 1982	Kansas State University	Manhattan	Kansas	Active	
Zeta Mu	1982–201x ?	Troy University	Troy	Alabama	Inactive	
Eta Mu	198x ?–xxxx ?				Inactive	
**Theta Mu**	March 18, 1984	Oklahoma State University–Oklahoma City	Oklahoma City	Oklahoma	Active	
**Iota Mu**	April 23, 1983	University of Kentucky	Lexington	Kentucky	Active	
Kappa Mu	1983–xxxx ?	Peru State College	Peru	Nebraska	Inactive	
Lambda Mu prime	1923–201x ?	East Carolina University	Greenville	North Carolina	Inactive	(Note: This chapter was suspended by the sorority until May 28, 2023.)
**Mu Mu**	1983	Georgia Southwestern State University	Americus	Georgia	Active	
**Nu Mu**	June 30, 1983	San Francisco State University	San Francisco	California	Active	(Note: This chapter was formed when San Francisco State University separated from Gamma Beta.)
Xi Mu	198x ?–xxxx ?				Inactive	
**Omicron Mu**	1983	Buffalo Metro (University at Buffalo and Buffalo State University)	Buffalo	New York	Active	
**Pi Mu**	November 16, 1983	Millersville University of Pennsylvania	Millersville	Pennsylvania	Active	
Rho Mu	October 22, 1983 – 200x ?	Cornell University	Ithaca	New York	Inactive	
**Sigma Mu**	October 5, 1983	Mississippi University for Women	Columbus	Mississippi	Active	
**Tau Mu**	1984	California State University, East Bay	Hayward	California	Active	
**Upsilon Mu**	February 25, 1984	Towson University	Towson	Maryland	Active	
**Phi Mu**	April 26, 1984	Stockton University	Galloway Township	New Jersey	Active	
**Chi Mu**	1984	Nicholls State University	Thibodaux	Louisiana	Active	
**Psi Mu**	April 24, 1984	San Jose State University	San Jose	California	Active	
**Omega Mu**	May 1984–xxxx ?; April 17, 2002	Mercer University	Macon	Georgia	Active	
**Alpha Nu**	October 13, 1985	State University of New York at New Paltz	New Paltz	New York	Active	
Beta Nu	1985–xxxx ?	Fairleigh Dickinson University		New Jersey	Inactive	
**Gamma Nu**	May 28, 1985	Austin Peay State University	Clarksville	Tennessee	Active	
**Delta Nu**	June 17, 1985	Cleveland Citywide	Cleveland	Ohio	Active	
**Epsilon Nu**	1986	State University of New York at Albany	Albany	New York	Active	
**Zeta Nu**	January 26, 1985	University of California, Davis	Davis	California	Active	
**Eta Nu**	1986	Clemson University	Clemson	South Carolina	Active	
**Theta Nu**	1986	James Madison University	Harrisonburg	Virginia	Active	
**Iota Nu**	March 23, 1986	Arkansas State University	Jonesboro	Arkansas	Active	
**Kappa Nu**	March 23, 1986	University of Washington	Seattle	Washington	Active	
Lambda Nu prime	1986–201x ?	Georgia State University	Atlanta	Georgia	Inactive	(Note: This chapter was suspended by the sorority until March 12, 2025.)
**Mu Nu** (see Omicron Alpha)	July 10, 1987	Wichita State University	Wichita	Kansas	Active	(Note: A prior chapter at Wichita State was called Omicron Alpha.)
**Nu Nu**	April 25, 1987	Oakland University	Oakland County	Michigan	Active	
**Xi Nu**	1987	Francis Marion University	Marion	South Carolina	Active	
**Omicron Nu**	198x ?	University of West Georgia	Carrollton	Georgia	Active	
**Pi Nu**	1987	University of North Carolina Wilmington	Wilmington	North Carolina	Active	
**Rho Nu**	November 15, 1987	Old Dominion University	Norfolk	Virginia	Active	
**Sigma Nu**	1988	Johnson & Wales University	Providence	Rhode Island	Active	
**Tau Nu**	February 25, 1988	Ball State University	Muncie	Indiana	Active	
**Upsilon Nu**	March 19, 1988	Iowa State University	Ames	Iowa	Active	
**Phi Nu**	1988	American Baptist College	Nashville	Tennessee	Active	
**Chi Nu**	1988	Jacksonville State University	Jacksonville	Alabama	Active	
Psi Nu	198x ?–xxxx ?				Inactive	
**Omega Nu**	1989	University of North Carolina at Greensboro	Greensboro	North Carolina	Active	
Alpha Xi	198x ?–xxxx ?				Inactive	
Beta Xi	198x ?–xxxx ?				Inactive	
**Gamma Xi**	1989	Auburn University	Auburn	Alabama	Active	
Delta Xi	October 14, 1989 – xxxx ?	DeVry University	Decatur	Georgia	Inactive	
**Epsilon Xi**	1991	Georgia Southern University	Statesboro	Georgia	Active	
**Zeta Xi**	September 27, 1989	Western Carolina University	Cullohwee	North Carolina	Active	
**Eta Xi**	1988	Georgia College & State University	Milledgeville	Georgia	Active	
**Theta Xi**	January 12, 1990	University of Detroit Mercy and Marygrove College	Detroit	Michigan	Active	
**Iota Xi**	1990	Southern Arkansas University	Magnolia	Arkansas	Active	
**Kappa Xi**	1990	University of Wisconsin–Whitewater	Whitewater	Wisconsin	Active	
Lambda Xi	199x ?–xxxx ?				Inactive	
**Mu Xi**	May 5, 1990	North Carolina State University	Raleigh	North Carolina	Active	
Nu Xi	199x ?–xxxx ?				Inactive	
Xi Xi	1990–xxxx ?	California Polytechnic State University, San Luis Obispo	San Luis Obispo	California	Inactive	
**Omicron Xi**	January 8, 1991	Texas State University	San Marcos	Texas	Active	
**Pi Xi**	March 30, 1991	University of Arizona	Tucson	Arizona	Active	
Rho Xi	199x ?–xxxx ?				Inactive	
Sigma Xi	199x ?–xxxx ?				Inactive	
**Tau Xi** (see Sigma Theta)	1999	University of West Alabama	Livingston	Alabama	Active	
**Upsilon Xi**	September 28, 1991	University of North Carolina at Charlotte	Charlotte	North Carolina	Active	
**Phi Xi**	March 11, 2001 – 20xx ?; February 26, 2017	Christopher Newport University	Newport News	Virginia	Active	
Chi Xi	1992–xxxx ?	Grand Valley State University	Allendale	Michigan	Inactive	
**Psi Xi**	1992	East Stroudsburg University of Pennsylvania	East Stroudsburg	Pennsylvania	Active	
Omega Xi	1992–20xx ?	Washington State University	Pullman	Washington	Inactive	
Alpha Omicron	1992–xxxx ?	California State University, Chico	Chico	California	Inactive	
Beta Omicron	199x ?–xxxx ?				Inactive	
**Gamma Omicron**	2018	Washburn University	Topeka	Kansas	Active	
Delta Omicron	199x ?–xxxx ?				Inactive	
Epsilon Omicron	199x ?–xxxx ?				Inactive	
**Zeta Omicron**	November 15, 1992	George Mason University	Fairfax	Virginia	Active	
**Eta Omicron**	April 24, 1993	West Virginia University	Morgantown	West Virginia	Active	
**Theta Omicron**	April 19, 1993	Rutgers University–Camden	Camden	New Jersey	Active	
**Iota Omicron**	June 5, 1993	New Orleans Citywide (Tulane University and Loyola University New Orleans)	New Orleans	Louisiana	Active	
Kappa Omincron	199x ?–xxxx ?	Bryant University	Smithfield	Rhode Island	Inactive	
**Lambda Omicron**	July 17, 1993	Texas Tech University	Lubbock	Texas	Active	
**Mu Omicron**	May 7, 1993 – xxxx ?; November 2015	Appalachian State University	Boone	North Carolina	Active	
**Nu Omicron**	September 22, 1993	Duke University	Durham	North Carolina	Active	
**Xi Omicron**	September 23, 1993	Elon University	Elon	North Carolina	Active	
**Omicron Omicron**	199x ?–2009, 20xx ?	Colorado State University	Fort Collins	Colorado	Active	(Note: The Omicron Omicron chapter was expelled by Colorado State University in 2009 for hazing.)
**Pi Omicron**	1993	Texas A&M University	College Station	Texas	Active	
**Rho Omicron**	1994	University of Oregon	Eugene	Oregon	Active	
**Sigma Omicron**	1994	Tarleton State University	Stephenville	Texas	Active	
**Tau Omicron**	1994	Southeast Missouri State University	Cape Girardeau	Missiouri	Active	
Upsilon Omicron	1994–xxxx ?	Truman State University	Kirksville	Missouri	Inactive	
**Phi Omicron**	April 14, 1994	Longwood University	Farmville	Virginia	Active	
Chi Omicron	1994–xxxx ?	PennWest Edinboro	Edinboro	Pennsylvania	Inactive	
**Psi Omicron**	1994	Southern Connecticut State University	New Haven	Connecticut	Active	
Omega Omicron	May 6, 1994 – xxxx ?; 2016–2021 ?	Wesley College	Dover	Delaware	Inactive	(Note: Wesley College was purchased by the Delaware State University in 2021 and became DSU Downtown.)
**Alpha Pi**	January 4, 1995	University of Toledo	Toledo	Ohio	Active	
**Beta Pi**	April 10, 1959	University of Massachusetts Amherst	Amherst	Massachusetts	Active	
Gamma Pi	199x ?–xxxx ?	University of California, Santa Cruz	Santa Cruz	California	Inactive	
**Delta Pi**	1995	Morehead State University	Morehead	Kentucky	Active	
**Epsilon Pi**	1995	Texarkana Citywide	Texarkana	Texas	Active	
**Zeta Pi**	1995	Indiana University Southeast	New Albany	Indiana	Active	
**Rho**	1996	Dallas Metropolitan and Southern Methodist University	Dallas	Texas	Active	(Note: This citywide chapter serves Dallas Baptist University, Southern Methodist University, University of North Texas System Center, and the University of Texas at Dallas.)
**Eta Pi**	April 30, 1996	Oklahoma State University–Stillwater	Stillwater	Oklahoma	Active	
**Theta Pi**	1997	Missouri State University	Springfield	Missiouri	Active	
Iota Pi	1997–xxxx ?	Marshall University	Huntington	West Virginia	Inactive	
**Kappa Pi**	198x–19xx ?; March 31, 1997 – 19xx ?; 2011	Minneapolis and Saint Paul Citywide	Minneapolis and Saint Paul	Minnesota	Active	(Note: Kappa Pi chapter was first chartered at the University of Minnesota. It was reformed in 1997 as a citywide chapter that continues to cover the campus and its greater community.)
Lambda Pi	1997–xxxx ?	Flint Citywide (University of Michigan–Flint and Kettering University)	Flint	Michigan	Inactive	
**Mu Pi**	November 26, 1997	California State University, Dominguez Hills	Carson	California	Active	
Nu Pi	199x ?–xxxx ?	Abilene Citywide	Abilene	Texas	Inactive	
Xi Pi	1998–xxxx ?	University of Wisconsin–Parkside	Kenosha	Wisconsin	Inactive	
**Omicron Pi**	April 25, 1998	Indianapolis Citywide (Butler University, Indiana University Indianapolis, Purdue University in Indianapolis, Marian University, Martin University, and University of Indianapolis)	Indianapolis	Indiana	Active	
Pi Pi	1998–2015 ?	Florida International University	Miami	Florida	Inactive	
**Rho Pi**	May 28, 1998 – xxxx ?; March 12, 2013	University of Nevada, Las Vegas	Paradise	Nevada	Active	
**Sigma Pi**	October 14, 1998	District of Columbia Metropolitan	Washington	District of Columbia	Active	(Note: Sigma Pi chapter was chartered at American University. However, the chapter is citywide and welcomes members from other Washington, D.C. colleges that do not have a Zeta Phi Beta chapter. Its members have included students from Trinity Washington University, Georgetown University, and Catholic University of America, in addition to American University.)
**Tau Pi**	November 9, 1998	University of Montevallo	Montevallo	Alabama	Active	
**Upsilon Pi**	1999	Baldwin Wallace University	Berea	Ohio	Active	
**Phi Pi**	June 16, 1999	University of South Carolina Aiken	Aiken	South Carolina	Active	
Chi Pi	1998–xxxx ?	Southern Polytechnic State University	Marietta	Georgia	Inactive	(Note: In 2015, Southern Poly consolidated with Kensaw State, with the latter being the surviving institution.)
**Psi Pi**	1999	Seton Hall University	South Orange	New Jersey	Active	
**Omega Pi**	March 18, 2000	Vanderbilt University	Nashville	Tennessee	Active	
**Alpha Rho**	November 7, 1999	Northern Kentucky University	Highland Heights	Kentucky	Active	
Beta Rho	1998–xxxx ?	Texas Christian University	Fort Worth	Texas	Inactive	
**Gamma Rho**	February 26, 2000	Georgia Tech	Atlanta	Georgia	Active	
**Delta Rho**	May 22, 1999	University of California, Santa Barbara	Santa Barbara	California	Active	
Epsilon Rho	xxxx ?–xxxx ?	Sojourner–Douglass College	Baltimore	Maryland	Inactive	(Note: Sojourner–Douglass College closed in June 2015.)
Zeta Rho	2000–20xx ?	St. Louis Citywide and University of Missouri–St. Louis	St. Louis	Missouri	Inactive	(Note: This chapter was suspended by the sorority until April 4, 2023.)
Eta Rho	20xx ?–2014	PennWest Clarion	Clarion	Pennsylvania	Inactive	
**Theta Rho**	June 24, 2000	Kennesaw State University	Cobb County	Georgia	Active	
Iota Rho	2000–20xx ?	North Carolina Wesleyan University	Rocky Mount	North Carolina	Inactive	
Kappa Rho	2000–20xx ?	Otterbein University	Westerville	Ohio	Inactive	
Lambda Rho	2000–20xx ?	Wright State University	Dayton	Ohio	Inactive	(Note: This chapter was suspended by the sorority until October 19, 2023.)
**Mu Rho**	2000	Coastal Carolina University	Conway	South Carolina	Active	
**Nu Rho**	2000	Murray State University	Murray	Kentucky	Active	
**Xi Rho**	April 28, 2001	Miami University	Oxford	Ohio	Active	
**Omicron Rho**	2001	State University of New York at Plattsburgh	Plattsburgh	New York	Active	
**Pi Rho**	May 25, 2002	University of South Carolina Upstate	Valley Falls	South Carolina	Active	
Rho Rho	April 27, 2002 – 20xx ?	Oberlin College	Oberlin	Ohio	Inactive	
**Sigma Rho**	September 9, 2002	Augusta University	Augusta	Georgia	Active	
**Tau Rho**	April 27, 2002	Bellarmine University	Louisville	Kentucky	Active	
Upsilon Rho	2002	Princeton University	Princeton	New Jersey		
**Phi Rho**	May 2002	Charleston Citywide	Charleston	South Carolina	Active	
**Chi Rho**	May 10, 2002	University of the Virgin Islands	Saint Croix	Virgin Islands	Active	
**Psi Rho**	January 14, 1989	Arkansas Baptist College	Little Rock	Arkansas	Active	
Omega Rho	May 5, 2003 – 20xx ?	Lock Haven University of Pennsylvania	Lock Haven	Pennsylvania	Inactive	
**Alpha Sigma**	November 22, 2003	University of North Alabama	Florence	Alabama	Active	
**Beta Sigma**	October 5, 2003	Wingate University	Wingate	North Carolina	Active	
**Gamma Sigma**	November 13, 2003	University of North Florida	Jacksonville	Florida	Active	
Delta Sigma	20xx ?–20xx ?	Southeastern University	Washington	District of Columbia	Inactive	(Note: Southeastern University closed in 2009.)
**Epsilon Sigma**	2004	California State University, San Bernardino/University of California, Riverside	San Bernardino and Riverside	California	Active	
**Zeta Sigma**	April 16, 2004	Kutztown University of Pennsylvania	Kutztown	Pennsylvania	Active	
Eta Sigma	20xx ?–20xx ?	Chestnut Hill College	Philadelphia	Pennsylvania	Active	
**Theta Sigma**	December 22, 2004	William Paterson University	Wayne	New Jersey	Active	
**Iota Sigma**	April 17, 2005	Clayton State University	Morrow	Georgia	Active	
**Kappa Sigma**	March 18, 2005	Drexel University	Philadelphia	Pennsylvania	Active	
Lambda Sigma	March 18, 2005 – 202x ?	Slippery Rock University	Slippery Rock	Pennsylvania	Inactive	
Mu Sigma	200x–2022° ?	Tennessee Tech	Cookeville	Tennessee	Inactive	
**Nu Sigma**	August 28, 2005	Northwestern University	Evanston, Illinois	Illinois	Active	
**Xi Sigma**	January 28, 2006	George Washington University	Washington	District of Columbia	Active	
**Pi Sigma**	200x ?	Baker University	Baldwin City	Kansas	Active	
**Rho Sigma**	December 2006	University of Missouri–Kansas City	Kansas City	Missouri	Active	
**Sigma Sigma**	2007	Robert Morris University	Moon Township	Pennsylvania	Active	
Tau Sigma	2007–20xx ?	Missouri Western State University	St. Joseph	Missouri	Inactive	(Note: This chapter was suspended by the sorority until September 1, 2025.)
Upsilon Sigma	200x–20xx ?				Inactive	
**Phi Sigma**	2007	Saginaw Citywide (formerly at Saginaw Valley State University)	Saginaw	Michigan	Active	
Chi Sigma	200x–20xx ?				Inactive	
Psi Sigma	200x–20xx ?			Louisiana	Inactive	
Omega Sigma	2008–201x ?	Northwest Missouri State University	Maryville	Missouri	Inactive	
**Alpha Tau**	February 15, 2008	Emory University	Atlanta	Georgia	Active	
**Beta Tau**	2008	Nova Southeastern University	Davie	Florida	Active	
**Gamma Tau**	April 19, 2008	Florida Gulf Coast University	Fort Myers	Florida	Active	
Delta Tau	200x ?–20xx ?				Inactive	
**Epsilon Tau**	April 30, 2008	High Point University	High Point	North Carolina	Active	
**Zeta Tau**	2008	Metro - Columbia	Columbia	South Carolina	Active	
Eta Tau	200x ?–20xx ?				Inactive	
**Theta Tau**	April 22, 2009	Lenoir–Rhyne University	Hickory	North Carolina	Active	
**Iota Tau**	May 2009	Georgia Southern University–Armstrong Campus	Savannah	Georgia	Active	
Kappa Tau	June 16, 2009 – 20xx ?	New Mexico State University	Las Cruces	New Mexico	Inactive	
**Lambda Tau**	March 8, 2010	DePauw University	Greencastle	Indiana	Active	
**Mu Tau**	20xx ?	Nevada State College	Henderson	Nevada	Active	
**Nu Tau**	April 19, 2010	University of New Mexico	Albuquerque	New Mexico	Active	
Xi Tau	2010–20xx ?	Birmingham Citywide	Birmingham	Alabama	Inactive	
**Pi Tau**	December 8, 2010	Widener University	Chester	Pennsylvania	Active	
**Rho Tau**	February 18, 2011	Gettysburg College	Gettysburg	Pennsylvania	Active	
Sigma Tau	201x ?	Jacksonville University	Jacksonville	Florida	Inactive	
Tau Tau	2011–20xx ?	Newberry College	Newberry	South Carolina	Inactive	
**Upsilon Tau**	2012	New Jersey City University and Saint Peter's University	Jersey City	New Jersey	Active	
Phi Tau	201x–20xx ?				Inactive	
**Chi Tau**	2011	Chowan University	Murfreesboro	North Carolina	Active	
**Psi Tau**	201x ?	Emporia State University	Wichita	Kansas	Active	
**Omega Tau**	March 2, 2012	University of Alabama in Huntsville	Huntsville	Alabama	Active	
Alpha Upsilon	201x–20xx ?				Inactive	
**Beta Upsilon**	April 5, 2012	Virginia Wesleyan University	Virginia Beach	Virginia	Active	
**Gamma Upsilon**	May 2012 Spring?	Pace University Pleasantville	Pleasantville	New York	Active	
Delta Upsilon	201x ?–20xx ?	Staten Island Countywide	Staten Island	New York	Inactive	
Epsilon Upsilon	201x ?–20xx ?	Penn State Harrisburg	Lower Swatara Township	Pennsylvania	Inactive	
**Zeta Upsilon**	November 29, 2016	Johnson & Wales University	North Miami	Florida	Active	
Eta Upsilon	March 23, 2013 – 20xx ?	Missouri Valley College	Marshall	Missouri	Inactive	
Theta Upsilon	March 3, 2013	University of New Haven	West Haven	Connecticut	Active	
**Iota Upsilon**	March 27, 2013	Bethel University	McKenzie	Tennessee	Active	
**Kappa Upsilon**	April 27, 2013	Ramapo College	Mahwah	New Jersey	Active	
**Lambda Upsilon**	2013	University of Dubuque	Dubuque	Iowa	Active	
Mu Upsilon	2013–20xx ?	McDaniel College	Westminster	Maryland	Inactive	
**Nu Upsilon**	June 30, 2013	California State University, Sacramento	Sacramento	California	Active	
Xi Upsilon	April 17, 2014 – 20xx ?	Oregon State University	Corvallis	Oregon	Inactive	
**Omicron Upsilon**	October 31, 2019	University of Massachusetts Dartmouth	North Dartmouth	Massachusetts	Active	
**Pi Upsilon**	November 9, 2014	Georgetown College	Georgetown	Kentucky	Active	
**Rho Upsilon**	2015	University of the Bahamas	Nassau	Providence, Bahamas	Active	
**Sigma Upsilon**	April 18, 2015	Queens University of Charlotte	Charlotte	North Carolina	Active	
**Tau Upsilon**	May 2015 Spring ?	University of South Carolina Beaufort	Beaufort	South Carolina	Active	
**Upsilon Upsilon**	2015	Texas A&M University–San Antonio	San Antonio	Texas	Active	
**Phi Upsilon**	October 26, 2015	Louisiana State University of Alexandria	Alexandria	Louisiana	Active	
**Chi Upsilon**	November 10, 2015	University of North Texas at Dallas	Dallas	Texas	Active	
**Psi Upsilon**	April 8, 2016	La Salle University	Philadelphia	Pennsylvania	Active	
**Omega Upsilon**	2016 ?	Campbell University	Bules Creek	North Carolina	Active	
**Alpha Phi**	April 9, 2016	University of Illinois Springfield	Springfield	Illinois	Active	
**Beta Phi**	March 30, 2016	Arkansas Tech University	Russellville	Arkansas	Active	
**Gamma Phi**	2016	University of California, Santa Cruz	Santa Cruz	California	Active	
**Delta Phi**	2016	Charlotte Citywide	Charlotte	North Carolina	Active	
**Epsilon Phi**	201x ?		New Haven	Connecticut	Active	
Zeta Phi	201x ?–20xx ?	Coe College	Cedar Rapids	Iowa	Inactive	
**Eta Phi**	March 27, 2017	Portland State University	Portland	Oregon	Active	
**Theta Phi**	March 10, 2018	University of Michigan–Dearborn	Dearborn	Michigan	Active	
**Iota Phi**	April 13, 2018	Fairmont State University	Fairmont	West Virginia	Active	
**Kappa Phi**	April 15, 2019	Bloomfield College	Bloomfield	New Jersey	Active	
**Lambda Phi**	2018	Millsaps College	Jackson	Mississippi	Active	
**Mu Phi**	April 28, 2018	Loyola University Chicago	Chicago	Illinois	Active	
**Nu Phi**	November 2, 2018	Rhodes College	Memphis	Tennessee	Active	
**Xi Phi**	March 15, 2019	Cornell University	Ithaca	New York	Active	
**Omicron Phi**	April 1, 2019	Northern Arizona University	Flagstaff	Arizona	Active	
**Lambda Mu**	April 28, 2018	Loyola University Chicago	Chicago	Illinois	Active	
**Lambda Nu**	November 2, 2018	Rhodes College	Memphis	Tennessee	Active	
**Pi Phi**	November 26, 2019	Allegheny College	Meadville	Pennsylvania	Active	
**Rho Phi**	February 17, 2020	Drake University	Des Moines	Iowa	Active	
**Sigma Phi**	February 26, 2020	Minnesota State University, Mankato	Mankato	Minnesota	Active	
**Tau Phi**	March 24, 2021	Quinnipiac University	Hamden	Connecticut	Active	
**Upsilon Phi**	2021	Columbia University	New York City	New York	Active	
**Phi Phi**	2021	York College, City University of New York	Jamaica	New York	Active	
**Chi Phi**	2021	Cumberland University	Lebanon	Tennessee	Active	
**Psi Phi**	April 4, 2022	Worcester Polytechnic Institute	Worcester	Massachusetts	Active	
Omega Phi	201x ?–20xx ?					
**Alpha Chi**	2022	Stetson University	DeLand	Florida	Active	
Beta Chi	March 31, 2023	Northeastern University	Boston	Massachusetts	Active	
Gamma Chi	February 11, 2023	University of Georgia	Athens	Georgia	Active	
Delta Chi	March 1, 2024	Tufts University	Medford	Massachusetts	Active	
	1989	DePaul University	Chicago	Illinois		
	2006	Johns Hopkins University	Baltimore	Maryland		
**Iota Chi**	March 26, 2025	Illinois Wesleyan University	Bloomington	Illinois		
**Lambda Chi**	April 28, 2025	Temple University	Philadelphia	Pennsylvania	Active	

== Graduate chapters ==
Following are the graduate chapters of Zeta Phi Beta. Active chapters are indicated in bold. Inactive chapters are in italic.

Chapter	Charter date and range	City or county	State or country	Status	Ref.
**Alpha Zeta**	November 16, 1923	Baltimore	Maryland	Active	
**Beta Zeta**	1925	Washington, D.C. Metropolitan	District of Columbia	Active	
Gamma Zeta first	192x ? – 193x ?	Shreveport	Louisiana	Inactive	
Gamma Zeta second	November 28, 1942 – 19xx ?	Fort Smith	Arkansas	Inactive	
**Gamma Zeta**	May 9, 1952	Charleston	South Carolina	Active	
**Delta Zeta**	December 4, 1934	Charlotte	North Carolina	Active	
**Epsilon Zeta**	1924	Atlanta Citywide	Georgia	Active	
**Zeta Zeta** (see **Zeta Tau Zeta**)	1926–1966; October 3, 1987	Dolton	Illinois	Active	(Note: In 1966, Zeta Zeta and Bete Iota Zeta chapters merged to form Zeta Tau Zeta chapter.)
**Eta Zeta**	1928	Louisville	Kentucky	Active	
**Theta Zeta**		Bluefield	West Virginia	Active	
**Iota Zeta**	June 30, 1931	Indianapolis	Indiana	Active	
**Kappa Zeta**	December 1931	Dallas	Texas	Active	
**Lambda Zeta**	March 29, 1934	Houston	Texas	Active	
**Mu Zeta**	1934	Baton Rouge	Louisiana	Active	
**Nu Zeta**	February 1935	Knoxville	Tennessee	Active	
**Xi Zeta**	December 5, 1935	St. Louis	Missouri	Active	
**Omicron Zeta**	August 15, 1935	Raleigh	North Carolina	Active	
**Pi Zeta**	1937	Nashville	Tennessee	Active	
**Rho Zeta**	December 15, 1935	Winston-Salem	North Carolina	Active	
**Sigma Zeta**	April 19, 1936	Wichita	Kansas	Active	
**Tau Zeta**		Gadsden County	Florida	Active	
**Upsilon Zeta**		Marshall	Texas	Active	
**Phi Zeta**		Henderson	North Carolina	Active	
**Chi Zeta**	December 13, 1936	Oklahoma City	Oklahoma	Active	
**Psi Zeta**	December 11, 1937	Fort Worth	Texas	Active	
**Omega Zeta**		Roanoke	Virginia	Active	
Upsilon Beta	December 1948–xxxx ?	Monrovia	Liberia	Inactive	
**Alpha Alpha Zeta**	April 14, 1938	Salisbury	North Carolina	Active	
**Beta Alpha Zeta**	April 12, 1944	Duval County	Florida	Active	
**Gamma Alpha Zeta**		Corpus Christi	Texas	Active	
**Delta Alpha Zeta**	April 22, 1949	Brooklyn	New York	Active	
**Epsilon Alpha Zeta**		Grambling	Louisiana	Active	
**Zeta Alpha Zeta**	November 12, 1970	Frankfort	Kentucky	Active	
**Eta Alpha Zeta**	November 20, 1967	Fort Myers	Florida	Active	
**Theta Alpha Zeta**	June 7, 1975	Rochester	New York	Active	
**Iota Alpha Zeta**		Madison County	Florida	Active	
**Kappa Alpha Zeta**		Moncks Corner	South Carolina	Active	
**Lambda Alpha Zeta**	September 21, 1981	Seattle	Washington	Active	
**Mu Alpha Zeta**		Marion County	Florida	Active	
**Nu Alpha Zeta**	September 18, 1984	Hickory	North Carolina	Active	
**Xi Alpha Zeta**		Peoria	Illinois	Active	
**Omicron Alpha Zeta**		Americus	Georgia	Active	
**Pi Alpha Zeta**	January 4, 1995	Portland	Oregon	Active	
**Rho Alpha Zeta**		Nashville	Tennessee	Active	
**Sigma Alpha Zeta**	July 12, 2000	Sturtevant	Wisconsin	Active	
**Tau Alpha Zeta**	March 30, 2003	Richton Park	Illinois	Active	
**Upsilon Alpha Zeta**	2004	South Broward (Pembroke Pines and Miramar)	Florida	Active	
**Phi Alpha Zeta**	March 16, 2007	White Plains and Charles County	Maryland	Active	
**Chi Alpha Zeta**	June 8, 2008	Surprise	Arizona	Active	
**Psi Alpha Zeta**		Madison	Alabama	Active	
**Omega Alpha Zeta**		Albuquerque	New Mexico	Active	
**Alpha Beta Zeta**	January 1939	Newport News and Hampton	Virginia	Active	
**Beta Beta Zeta**		Columbia	South Carolina	Active	
**Gamma Beta Zeta**	1947	Brookhaven	Mississippi	Active	
**Delta Beta Zeta**	May 25, 1957	Rochdale Village, Queens	New York	Active	
**Epsilon Beta Zeta**	19xx ?–xxxx ?; April 1, 2010	Plant City	Florida	Active	
**Zeta Beta Zeta**	1958	Flint	Michigan	Active	
**Eta Beta Zeta**	April 16, 1968	Durham	North Carolina	Active	
**Iota Beta Zeta**		Blytheville	Arkansas	Active	
**Kappa Beta Zeta**		Milwaukee	Wisconsin	Active	
**Lambda Beta Zeta**		Indian River County	Florida	Active	
**Mu Beta Zeta**	April 7, 1956	Gastonia	North Carolina	Active	
**Nu Beta Zeta**	1985	Radcliff	Kentucky	Active	
**Xi Beta Zeta**		Wilberforce	Ohio	Active	
**Omicron Beta Zeta**	November 22, 1990	Arlington	Texas	Active	
Pi Beta Zeta				Inactive	
**Rho Beta Zeta**		Vallejo	California	Active	
**Sigma Beta Zeta**	July 12, 2000	Roseville	Minnesota	Active	
Tau Beta Zeta				Inactive	
Upsilon Beta Zeta				Inactive	
**Phi Beta Zeta**	April 17, 2007	Tulsa	Oklahoma	Active	
**Chi Beta Zeta**	June 7, 2008	Randallstown and Baltimore County	Maryland	Active	
**Psi Beta Zeta**	April 3, 2010	Southaven	Mississippi	Active	
**Omega Beta Zeta**	July 19, 2011	Farmville	Virginia	Active	
**Alpha Gamma Zeta**	1938	New Orleans	Louisiana	Active	
Beta Gamma Zeta		Kimberly	West Virginia	Inactive	
**Gamma Gamma Zeta**	1947	Columbus	Mississippi	Active	
**Delta Gamma Zeta**	1952	Phoenix Metro	Arizona	Active	
**Epsilon Gamma Zeta**		Rocky Mount	North Carolina	Active	
**Zeta Gamma Zeta**		Pinellas County	Florida	Active	
**Eta Gamma Zeta**	April 1965	Brunswick	Georgia	Active	
**Theta Gamma Zeta**		Helena	Arkansas	Active	
Iota Gamma Zeta		Albuquerque	New Mexico	Inactive	
Kappa Gamma Zeta				Inactive	
**Lambda Gamma Zeta**	September 29, 1981	Columbia and Howard County	Maryland	Active	
**Mu Gamma Zeta**	1983	Kendall, Richmond Heights, Perrine, Cutler Bay, Princeton, Homestead, and Florida City	Florida	Active	
**Nu Gamma Zeta**		Jackson	Tennessee	Active	
Xi Gamma Zeta		Atmore	Alabama	Inactive	
**Omicron Gamma Zeta**	December 8, 1990	Clear Lake	Texas	Active	
**Pi Gamma Zeta**	January 31, 1995	Southfield	Michigan	Active	
Rho Gamma Zeta				Inactive	
**Sigma Gamma Zeta**	December 12, 2000	Jonesboro	Arkansas	Active	
**Tau Gamma Zeta**	March 28, 2003	Rockland County	New York	Active	
**Upsilon Gamma Zeta**		Jackson	Tennessee	Active	
**Phi Gamma Zeta**	March 12, 2007	Hopewell	Virginia	Active	
Chi Gamma Zeta				Inactive	
**Psi Gamma Zeta**	March 10, 2010	Auburn	Alabama	Active	
**Omega Gamma Zeta**	July 30, 2011	Chesterfield	Virginia	Active	
**Alpha Delta Zeta**	October 14, 1938	Jackson	Mississippi	Active	
**Beta Delta Zeta**		Philadelphia	Pennsylvania	Active	
**Gamma Delta Zeta**	1946	Cleveland	Ohio	Active	
**Delta Delta Zeta**	May 14, 1949	San Francisco	California	Active	
Epsilon Delta Zeta				Inactive	
**Zeta Delta Zeta**	1959	Burlington County	New Jersey	Active	
**Eta Delta Zeta**	October 6, 1959 – 2002; June 2, 2013	Shelby	North Carolina	Active	
Theta Delta Zeta				Inactive	
**Iota Delta Zeta**		Hayward	California	Active	
**Kappa Delta Zeta**		Alexander City	Alabama	Active	
**Lambda Delta Zeta**	October 14, 1981	Greenville	Alabama	Active	
**Mu Delta Zeta**	May 23, 1983	Killeen	Texas	Active	
**Nu Delta Zeta**	May 18, 1985	Greer, Travelers Rest, and Taylors	South Carolina	Active	
**Xi Delta Zeta**	1986–xxxx ?; July 27, 2019	Jackson and McIntosh	Alabama	Active	
**Omicron Delta Zeta**	1990	Boca Raton, Delray Beach, and Boynton Beach	Florida	Active	
**Pi Delta Zeta**	April 10, 1995	Cedar Rapids	Iowa	Active	
**Rho Delta Zeta**	1998	Washtenaw County	Michigan	Active	
**Sigma Delta Zeta**	March 18, 2001	Henrico	Virginia	Active	
**Tau Delta Zeta**	April 10, 2003	Laurel and Princes George's County	Maryland	Active	
**Upsilon Delta Zeta**		Martinsville	Virginia	Active	
**Phi Delta Zeta**		Manchester	Connecticut	Active	
**Chi Delta Zeta**	August 2, 2008	Lenexa	Kansas	Active	
Psi Delta Zeta				Inactive	
**Omega Delta Zeta**	September 1, 2011	Friendswood	Texas	Active	
**Alpha Epsilon Zeta**	February 4, 1939	Kansas City	Kansas	Active	
**Beta Epsilon Zeta**		Shreveport	Louisiana	Active	
**Gamma Epsilon Zeta**	May 1957	Concord	North Carolina	Active	
**Delta Epsilon Zeta**	June 1, 1949	West Palm Beach	Florida	Active	
**Epsilon Epsilon Zeta**	October 27, 1954	Orange County and Orlando	Florida	Active	
**Zeta Epsilon Zeta**	November 11, 1960	Lawton	Oklahoma	Active	
Eta Epsilon Zeta		Odessa	Texas	Inactive	
**Theta Epsilon Zeta**	January 23, 1976	Nassau	New Providence, The Bahamas	Active	
Iota Epsilon Zeta				Inactive	
**Kappa Epsilon Zeta**	February 27, 1980	Bronx	New York	Active	
**Lambda Epsilon Zeta**		Lancaster	South Carolina	Active	
Mu Epsilon Zeta				Inactive	
**Nu Epsilon Zeta**	June 6, 1985	Lafayette	Louisiana	Active	
**Xi Epsilon Zeta**	1988	Natchez	Mississippi	Active	
**Omicron Epsilon Zeta**	1990	Albany	New York	Active	
Pi Epsilon Zeta				Inactive	
**Rho Epsilon Zeta**	December 18, 1998	Cobb County	Georgia	Active	
**Sigma Epsilon Zeta**	April 5, 1978	Ames	Iowa	Active	
**Tau Epsilon Zeta**	May 31, 2003	Hope Mills	North Carolina	Active	
**Upsilon Epsilon Zeta**	February 24, 2005	Lawrenceville	Virginia	Active	
Phi Epsilon Zeta				Inactive	
Chi Epsilon Zeta				Inactive	
**Psi Epsilon Zeta**	March 10, 2010	Cullen	Louisiana	Active	
Omega Epsilon Zeta				Inactive	
Alpha Zeta Zeta		Beckley	West Virginia	Inactive	
**Beta Zeta Zeta**	September 1943	Cincinnati	Ohio	Active	(Note: Beta Zeta Zeta chapter formed when the collegiate Iota chapter went dormant.)
**Gamma Zeta Zeta**	September 4, 1943	Columbus	Ohio	Active	
**Delta Zeta Zeta**	December 3, 1949	Prince George's County	Maryland	Active	
**Epsilon Zeta Zeta**	March 7, 1954	Pine Bluff	Arkansas	Active	
**Zeta Zeta Zeta**	July 2, 1960	Denver	Colorado	Active	
**Eta Zeta Zeta**	October 1969	Kansas City	Missiouri	Active	
**Theta Zeta Zeta**	December 5, 1975	Dover	Delaware	Active	
**Iota Zeta Zeta**	November 17, 1979	Minneapolis	Minnesota	Active	
Kappa Zeta Zeta				Inactive	
**Lambda Zeta Zeta**	1981	Bessemer	Alabama	Active	
**Mu Zeta Zeta**		Somerville	Tennessee	Active	
**Nu Zeta Zeta**		Pritchard	Alabama	Active	
**Xi Zeta Zeta**	1988	San Jose	California	Active	
**Omicron Zeta Zeta**		Tucson	Arizona	Active	
**Pi Zeta Zeta**	August 21, 1995	Inland Empire and San Bernardino	California	Active	
**Rho Zeta Zeta**	March 4, 1999	Greenville	North Carolina	Active	
**Sigma Zeta Zeta**		Hudson County	New Jersey	Active	
Tau Zeta Zeta				Inactive	
**Upsilon Zeta Zeta**	February 25, 2005	Grandview	Missiouri	Active	
**Phi Zeta Zeta**	April 14, 2007	Queens	New York	Active	
**Chi Zeta Zeta**		Wellington, Royal Palm Beach, and Loxahatchee	Florida	Active	
**Psi Zeta Zeta**	March 24, 2010	Lake County	Florida	Active	
**Omega Zeta Zeta**	November 7, 2011	Jacksonville, Southside, and Jacksonville Beaches	Florida	Active	
**Alpha Eta Zeta**	May 27, 1939	Memphis	Tennessee	Active	
Beta Eta Zeta (see Alpha Psi Zeta)	xxxx ?–1955	Los Angeles	California	Merged	(Note: Chapter merged with Gamma Sigma Zeta chapter to form Alpha Psi Zeta chapter.)
**Beta Eta Zeta**	1956	Tuscaloosa	Alabama	Active	
**Gamma Eta Zeta**		Selma	Alabama	Active	
**Delta Eta Zeta**	February 1950	Fort Lauderdale and Broward County	Florida	Active	
**Epsilon Eta Zeta**	1954	Columbus	Georgia	Active	
**Zeta Eta Zeta**		St. Lucie County and Fort Pierce	Florida	Active	
**Eta Eta Zeta**		Yanceyville	North Carolina	Active	
**Theta Eta Zeta**		Thomasville	North Carolina	Active	
**Iota Eta Zeta**		Decatur	Georgia	Active	
**Kappa Eta Zeta**		Camden	South Carolina	Active	
**Lambda Eta Zeta**	December 4, 1981	Lumberton	North Carolina	Active	
**Mu Eta Zeta**		Carbondale	Illinois	Active	
**Nu Eta Zeta**		Florence	Alabama	Active	
**Xi Eta Zeta**		Novato	California	Active	
**Pi Eta Zeta**	September 30, 1995	Seoul	South Korea	Active	
Omicron Eta Zeta		Albany	New York	Inactive	
**Rho Eta Zeta**	April 10, 1999	Glen Burnie and Anne Arundel County	Maryland	Active	
**Sigma Eta Zeta**	April 12, 2001	Long Beach	California	Active	(Note: This chapter formed in the later 1980s but was not chartered until 2001.)
**Tau Eta Zeta**	August 5, 2003	Baltimore	Maryland	Active	
**Upsilon Eta Zeta**	March 11, 2005 – 2010; October 24, 2014	Mon Valley	Pennsylvania	Active	
**Phi Eta Zeta**		Tokyo	Japan	Active	
**Chi Eta Zeta**	June 23, 2008	Cambridge	Massachusetts	Active	
**Psi Eta Zeta**	March 31, 2010	Cape Girardeau	Missiouri	Active	
**Omega Eta Zeta**	March 16, 2012	Quincy	Massachusetts	Active	
**Alpha Theta Zeta**	July 1, 1939	Savannah	Georgia	Active	
**Beta Theta Zeta** (see Rho first)	November 30, 1944	Norfolk	Virginia	Active	(Note: Chapter formed when the collegiate Rho first chapter dissolved.)
Gamma Theta Zeta				Inactive	
**Delta Theta Zeta**		Mobile	Alabama	Active	
**Epsilon Theta Zeta**	February 26, 1967	Suffolk	Virginia	Active	
**Zeta Theta Zeta**		Gary	Indiana	Active	
**Eta Theta Zeta**		Augusta	Georgia	Active	
**Theta Theta Zeta**		Hammond	Louisiana	Active	
**Iota Theta Zeta**	January 26, 1979	Nassau County	New York	Active	
**Kappa Theta Zeta**		Sanford	North Carolina	Active	
**Lambda Theta Zeta**		Aliceville	Alabama	Active	
**Mu Theta Zeta**	July 1, 1983	Darmstadt	Germany	Active	
**Nu Theta Zeta**	May 31, 1986	Warrensville Heights	Ohio	Active	
Xi Theta Zeta				Inactive	
**Pi Theta Zeta**		Smoaks	South Carolina	Active	
**Rho Theta Zeta**	April 19, 1999	Portage	Michigan	Active	
**Sigma Theta Zeta**		East Chicago	Indiana	Active	
**Tau Theta Zeta**		Pineville and Mathews	North Carolina	Active	
**Upsilon Theta Zeta**	2005	Redford	Michigan	Active	
**Phi Theta Zeta**	October 25, 2007	Gardena	California	Active	
**Chi Theta Zeta**	June 16, 2008	Tallahassee	Florida	Active	
**Psi Theta Zeta**	September 2015	North Los Vegas	Nevada	Active	
**Omega Theta Zeta**	March 16, 2012	Okinawa	Japan	Active	
Alpha Iota Zeta (see Pi first)	November 19, 1945 – xxxx ?	Tulsa	Oklahoma	Inactive	(Note: This chapter formed from the Pi first collegiate chapter.)
Beta Iota Zeta first (see **Zeta Tau Zeta**)	19xx ?–1966	Chicago	Illinois	Inactive	
**Beta Iota Zeta**	April 23, 1994	Bloomington and Normal	Illinois	Active	
**Gamma Iota Zeta**		Chattanooga	Tennessee	Active	
**Delta Iota Zeta**	1948–198x ?, January 15, 2021	Monrovia	Liberia	Active	
**Epsilon Iota Zeta**	May 1954	Greenville	South Carolina	Active	
**Zeta Iota Zeta**		Shreveport	Louisiana	Active	
**Eta Iota Zeta**		El Paso	Texas	Active	
**Theta Iota Zeta**	January 1976 – 19xx ?; August 28, 2014	Pasadena and Altadena	California	Active	
Iota Iota Zeta				Inactive	
**Kappa Iota Zeta**	September 15, 1980	Atlanta	Georgia	Active	
**Lambda Iota Zeta**		Jeanerette	Louisiana	Active	
Mu Iota Zeta				Inactive	
**Nu Iota Zeta**		Madison	Wisconsin	Active	
**Xi Iota Zeta**		Bennettsville	South Carolina	Active	
**Omicron Iota Zeta**	September 12, 1991	Wilson	North Carolina	Active	
**Pi Iota Zeta**	1996	Starkville	Mississippi	Active	
**Rho Iota Zeta**	1999	Mendenhall	Mississippi	Active	
**Sigma Iota Zeta**	2001	Brice	Ohio	Active	
**Tau Iota Zeta**	September 10, 2003	Morgantown	West Virginia	Active	
**Upsilon Iota Zeta**	March 11, 2005	Columbia	Missiouri	Active	
**Phi Iota Zeta**		Montgomery County	Texas	Active	
**Chi Iota Zeta**	2008	East Lansing	Michigan	Active	
**Psi Iota Zeta**		Camden	Arkansas	Active	
**Omega Iota Zeta**		Kansas City	Missiouri	Active	
**Alpha Kappa Zeta**	February 18, 1940	Austin	Texas	Active	
**Beta Kappa Zeta**		Lake Charles	Louisiana	Active	
**Gamma Kappa Zeta**	1962	Tyler	Texas	Active	
**Delta Kappa Zeta**		Highpoint	North Carolina	Active	
**Epsilon Kappa Zeta**		Lynchburg	Virginia	Active	
**Zeta Kappa Zeta**	1962	Texarkana	Texas	Active	
**Eta Kappa Zeta**		East St. Louis	Illinois	Active	
**Theta Kappa Zeta**		Anniston	Alabama	Active	
**Iota Kappa Zeta**			Tennessee	Active	
Kappa Kappa Zeta				Inactive	
**Lambda Kappa Zeta**	1982	Hattiesburg	Mississippi	Active	
**Mu Kappa Zeta**	September 24, 1983	Marion	South Carolina	Active	
**Nu Kappa Zeta**	1986	Vicksburg	Mississippi	Active	
**Xi Kappa Zeta**	November 17, 1988	Colorado Springs	Colorado	Active	
**Omicron Kappa Zeta**	October 5, 1991	College Park	Georgia	Active	
**Pi Kappa Zeta**		Burlington	North Carolina	Active	
**Rho Kappa Zeta**	September 25, 1999	St. Andrews, north Columbia, and West Columbia	South Carolina	Active	
**Sigma Kappa Zeta**	September 7, 2001	Brooklyn	New York	Active	
**Tau Kappa Zeta**	October 18, 2003	Slidell	Louisiana	Active	
**Upsilon Kappa Zeta**	April 6, 2005	Bloomington	Indiana	Active	
**Phi Kappa Zeta**	December 5, 2007	Woodbridge	Virginia	Active	
**Chi Kappa Zeta**	2009	Benton Harbor	Michigan	Active	
**Psi Kappa Zeta**		Warrensburg	Missiouri	Active	
**Omega Kappa Zeta**	April 12, 2012	Stockton, San Joaquin County, and east Contra Costa County	California	Active	
Alpha Lambda Zeta	February 24, 1940 – xxxx ?	Muskogee	Oklahoma	Inactive	
**Beta Lambda Zeta**	December 22, 1945	Asheville and Hendersonville	North Carolina	Active	
**Gamma Lambda Zeta**		Volusia County and Daytona Beach	Florida	Active	
**Delta Lambda Zeta**	1949	Tifton	Georgia	Active	
**Epsilon Lambda Zeta**		Prairie View	Texas	Active	
**Zeta Lambda Zeta**		Laurens	South Carolina	Active	
**Eta Lambda Zeta**	1971	Mount Clemens	Michigan	Active	
Theta Lambda Zeta		Champaign-Urbana	Illinois	Inactive	
**Iota Lambda Zeta**	April 7, 1979	Aiken	South Carolina	Active	
**Kappa Lambda Zeta**		Lexington	Kentucky	Active	
**Lambda Lambda Zeta**	February 1, 1982	Pittsburgh	Pennsylvania	Active	
**Mu Lambda Zeta**	September 12, 1983	Jacksonville	North Carolina	Active	
Nu Lambda Zeta				Inactive	
Xi Lambda Zeta		Richmond	California	Inactive	
Omicron Lambda Zeta				Inactive	
**Pi Lambda Zeta**	May 17, 1996	New Haven County and Bridgeport	Connecticut	Active	
**Rho Lambda Zeta**	1999	SeaTac	Washington	Active	
**Sigma Lambda Zeta**		Columbus	Georgia	Active	
Tau Lambda Zeta				Inactive	
**Upsilon Lambda Zeta**		Bowling Green	Kentucky	Active	
**Phi Lambda Zeta**	2008	West Point	Mississippi	Active	
**Chi Lambda Zeta**	February 6, 2009	Bartlett	Tennessee	Active	
**Psi Lambda Zeta**		Prattville	Alabama	Active	
**Omega Lambda Zeta**		Rancho Cordova	California	Active	
**Alpha Mu Zeta**	May 18, 1940	Little Rock	Arkansas	Active	
**Beta Mu Zeta**	April 7, 1956 – 2006; October 2016	Gastonia	North Carolina	Active	
**Gamma Mu Zeta**	May 1, 1948	Spartanburg	South Carolina	Active	
**Delta Mu Zeta**	June 30, 1950	Manhattan	New York	Active	
Epsilon Mu Zeta		Moultrie	Georgia	Inactive	
**Zeta Mu Zeta**		Putnam County and Hastings	Florida	Active	
**Eta Mu Zeta**	March 4, 1972	Tacoma	Washington	Active	
**Theta Mu Zeta**	May 22, 1976	Longview	Texas	Active	
**Iota Mu Zeta**		Hartsville	South Carolina	Active	
Lambda Mu Zeta				Inactive	
**Mu Mu Zeta**	1984	Tupelo	Mississippi	Active	
**Nu Mu Zeta**	December 31, 1986	Des Moines	Iowa	Active	
**Xi Mu Zeta**	1989	Markham	Illinois	Active	
Omicron Mu Zeta				Inactive	
Pi Mu Zeta				Inactive	
**Rho Mu Zeta**	October 15, 1999	Clarksville	Tennessee	Active	
**Sigma Mu Zeta**	December 20, 2001	Stone Mountain	Georgia	Active	
Tau Mu Zeta		Suisun City	California	Inactive	
**Upsilon Mu Zeta**	October 22, 2005	LaPlace	Louisiana	Active	
**Phi Mu Zeta**		Pomona Valley/Rancho Cucamonga	California	Active	
**Chi Mu Zeta**		West Park	Florida	Active	
**Psi Mu Zeta**	September 12, 2010	Charlotte	North Carolina	Active	
**Omega Mu Zeta**	2014	middle and southern Middlesex County	New Jersey	Active	
Alpha Nu Zeta				Inactive	
**Beta Nu Zeta**	November 24, 1945	Greensboro	North Carolina	Active	
**Gamma Nu Zeta**	March 25, 1948	Camden and western Camden County	New Jersey	Active	
**Delta Nu Zeta**	1950	Meridian	Mississippi	Active	
**Epsilon Nu Zeta**		Leesburg, Tavares, Eustis, Lady Lake, Sorrento, Sumter County, north Lake County	Florida	Active	
**Zeta Nu Zeta**	1964	Inkster	Michigan	Active	
**Eta Nu Zeta**	October 23, 1972	North Dade and south Broward County	Florida	Active	
**Theta Nu Zeta**		Jefferson City	Missiouri	Active	
**Iota Nu Zeta**		Elizabeth City	North Carolina	Active	
Kappa Nu Zeta		Warren	Ohio	Inactive	
**Lambda Nu Zeta**	August 15, 1982	Summerville and Ridgeville	South Carolina	Active	
Mu Nu Zeta				Inactive	
Nu Nu Zeta				Inactive	
**Xi Nu Zeta**	March 10, 1989	Midwest City	Oklahoma	Active	
**Omicron Nu Zeta**	March 23, 1992	New Orleans	Louisiana	Active	
Pi Nu Zeta				Inactive	
**Rho Nu Zeta**	1999	Kosciusko	Mississippi	Active	
**Sigma Nu Zeta**	2002	Harlem	New York	Active	
**Tau Nu Zeta**		Monroe	North Carolina	Active	
**Upsilon Nu Zeta**	October 29, 2005	Lancaster	Texas	Active	
**Phi Nu Zeta**	February 11, 2008	Florissant	Missiouri	Active	
**Chi Nu Zeta**	April 19, 2009	Vidalia	Louisiana	Active	
Psi Nu Zeta				Inactive	
**Omega Nu Zeta**		Marion	Arkansas	Active	
**Alpha Xi Zeta**		Tuskegee	Alabama	Active	
**Beta Xi Zeta**	1969	Moss Point	Mississippi	Active	
**Gamma Xi Zeta**		Elmsford and Westchester County	New York	Active	
**Delta Xi Zeta**		Rock Hill	South Carolina	Active	
**Epsilon Xi Zeta**	May 27, 1954	Mercer County	New Jersey	Active	
**Zeta Xi Zeta**	May 1965	Toledo	Ohio	Active	
**Eta Xi Zeta**	June 2016	Ardmore	Oklahoma	Active	
**Theta Xi Zeta**	June 1976	LaGrange	Georgia	Active	
**Iota Xi Zeta**		Lake City	South Carolina	Active	
**Kappa Xi Zeta**		Syracuse	New York	Active	
**Lambda Xi Zeta**	1982	Gulfport	Mississippi	Active	
**Mu Xi Zeta**	October 1, 1983	Baltimore County	Maryland	Active	
**Nu Xi Zeta**	November 29, 1986	Alexandria	Virginia	Active	
**Xi Xi Zeta**	March 15, 1989	Lithonia	Georgia	Active	
**Omicron Xi Zeta**		Williamsburg	Virginia	Active	
**Pi Xi Zeta**		Spokane	Washington	Active	
**Rho Xi Zeta**	November 6, 1999	Kennesaw	Georgia	Active	
**Sigma Xi Zeta**		Morrisville	North Carolina	Active	
**Tau Xi Zeta**	April 4, 2004	Forest Park	Illinois	Active	
**Upsilon Xi Zeta**		Plymouth	North Carolina	Active	
**Phi Xi Zeta**		Coral Springs	Florida	Active	
**Chi Xi Zeta**	June 7, 2009	Clayton	North Carolina	Active	
**Psi Xi Zeta**		Camden	North Carolina	Active	
**Omega Xi Zeta**		Wetumpka	Alabama	Active	
**Alpha Omicron Zeta**	February 8, 1941	Orangeburg	South Carolina	Active	
**Beta Omicron Zeta**	1945	Detroit	Michigan	Active	
**Gamma Omicron Zeta**	March 2, 1953	Essex County	New Jersey	Active	
**Delta Omicron Zeta**	May 1942	Boston	Massachusetts	Active	
**Epsilon Omicron Zeta**		Monroe	Louisiana	Active	
Zeta Omicron Zeta		San Bernardino	California	Inactive	
**Eta Omicron Zeta**	March 17, 1972	Union County and Middlesex County	New Jersey	Active	
**Theta Omicron Zeta**		Los Vegas	Nevada	Active	
**Iota Omicron Zeta**		Belle Glade, Pahokee, South Bay, and Clewiston	Florida	Active	
Kappa Omicron Zeta				Inactive	
**Lambda Omicron Zeta**		Georgetown	South Carolina	Active	
**Mu Omicron Zeta**		Jackson County and Marianna	Florida	Active	
**Nu Omicron Zeta**	January 30, 1987	San Fernando Valley	California	Active	
**Omicron Omicron Zeta**	May 1993	Gloucester County	New Jersey	Active	
**Pi Omicron Zeta**	January 16, 1997 – xxxx ?; March 2011	Sykesville and Carroll County	Maryland	Active	
**Rho Omicron Zeta**	January 1, 2000	Staten Island	New York	Active	
**Sigma Omicron Zeta**	March 24, 2002	Lawrenceville	Georgia	Active	
**Tau Omicron Zeta**	April 12, 2004	Hephzibah	Georgia	Active	
**Upsilon Omicron Zeta**	December 12, 2005	South Bend	Indiana	Active	
**Phi Omicron Zeta**	March 7, 2008	Covington and Conyers	Georgia	Active	
**Chi Omicron Zeta**		Virginia Beach	Virginia	Active	
**Psi Omicron Zeta**	November 6, 2010	Manassas	Virginia	Active	
**Omega Omicron Zeta**	December 2, 1912	Brevard County	Florida	Active	
**Alpha Pi Zeta**	February 27, 1939	San Antonio	Texas	Active	
**Beta Pi Zeta**	October 15, 1946	Sumter	South Carolina	Active	
Gamma Pi Zeta		Martin	Texas	Inactive	
**Delta Pi Zeta**		Ahoskie	North Carolina	Active	
Epsilon Pi Zeta		Anniston	Alabama	Inactive	
**Zeta Pi Zeta**	January 1965	Portsmouth	Virginia	Active	
**Eta Pi Zeta**	November 11, 1973	Silver Spring and Montgomery County	Maryland	Active	
**Theta Pi Zeta**	1976	Itta Bena	Mississippi	Active	
**Iota Pi Zeta**	June 23, 1979	Poughkeepsie	New York	Active	
Kappa Pi Zeta				Inactive	
**Lambda Pi Zeta**	1982	Carson	California	Active	
**Mu Pi Zeta**	November 19, 1983	Beaufort	South Carolina	Active	
**Nu Pi Zeta**	1987	Forest	Mississippi	Active	
**Xi Pi Zeta**		Davenport	Iowa	Active	
**Omicron Pi Zeta**	June 26, 1993	south Okaloosa County and Santa Rosa County	Florida	Active	
**Pi Pi Zeta**	January 30, 1997	Henderson	Nevada	Active	
**Rho Pi Zeta**		Liberty	Mississippi	Active	
**Sigma Pi Zeta**	2016	Detroit	Michigan	Active	
**Tau Pi Zeta**		Riverview	Florida	Active	
**Upsilon Pi Zeta**		West Memphis	Arkansas	Active	
**Phi Pi Zeta**	2008–20xx ?; April 18, 2017	Douglasville	Georgia	Active	
**Chi Pi Zeta**	May 19, 2009	Hinesville	Georgia	Active	
**Psi Pi Zeta**		Huntington	West Virginia	Active	
**Omega Pi Zeta**	November 9, 2012	Evanston	Illinois	Active	
**Alpha Rho Zeta**		Montgomery	Alabama	Active	
**Beta Rho Zeta**		Fort Valley	Georgia	Active	
**Gamma Rho Zeta**		Manatee County and Sarasota County	Florida	Active	
**Delta Rho Zeta**		Kinston	North Carolina	Active	
**Epsilon Rho Zeta**	1955	Bear	Delaware	Active	
**Zeta Rho Zeta**	19xx ?–xxxx ?; March 8, 2014	Wilmington	North Carolina	Active	
**Eta Rho Zeta**		Lumpkin	Georgia	Active	
**Theta Rho Zeta**	1977	Lansing	Michigan	Active	
Iota Rho Zeta				Inactive	
**Kappa Rho Zeta**	1981	Highland Park	Michigan	Active	
**Lambda Rho Zeta**	1983	Pontiac	Michigan	Active	
**Mu Rho Zeta** (see Epsilon Upsilon Zeta first)	February 6, 1984 – 198x ?; January 11, 1992	Akron	Ohio	Active	(Note: The original chapter in Akron was called Epsilon Upsilon Zeta.)
Nu Rho Zeta				Inactive	
**Xi Rho Zeta**		Mountain Home	Tennessee	Active	
**Omicron Rho Zeta**	1993	Inglewood	California	Active	
**Pi Rho Zeta**	1997	Grand Rapids	Michigan	Active	
**Rho Rho Zeta**		Cumberland County and Salem County	New Jersey	Active	
**Sigma Rho Zeta**	June 1, 2002	Cary	North Carolina	Active	
**Tau Rho Zeta**		Conway	Arkansas	Active	
**Upsilon Rho Zeta**		Bamberg	South Carolina	Active	
**Phi Rho Zeta**		Roanoke Rapids	North Carolina	Active	
**Chi Rho Zeta**		Sicklerville	New Jersey	Active	
**Psi Rho Zeta**		Forsyth	Georgia	Active	
**Omega Rho Zeta**	December 1, 2012	Marana	Arizona	Active	
**Alpha Sigma Zeta**		Birmingham	Alabama	Active	
**Beta Sigma Zeta**		Tampa	Florida	Active	
Gamma Sigma Zeta prime (see **Alpha Psi Zeta**)	19xx ?–1955	Los Angeles	California	Merged	(Note: Chapter merged with Beta Eta Zeta chapter to form Alpha Psi Zeta chapter.)
Gamma Sigma Zeta		Amarillo	Texas	Inactive	
**Delta Sigma Zeta**	September 21, 1974	Alachua County	Florida	Active	
Epsilon Sigma Zeta				Inactive	
**Zeta Sigma Zeta**	April 17, 1966	Valdosta	Georgia	Active	
**Eta Sigma Zeta**	March 23, 1974	Little Rock	Arkansas	Active	
**Theta Sigma Zeta**		Cuthbert	Georgia	Active	
**Iota Sigma Zeta**		New Bern	North Carolina	Active	
**Kappa Sigma Zeta**	February 18, 1981	Springfield	Illinois	Active	
Lambda Sigma Zeta				Inactive	
**Mu Sigma Zeta**	1984	San Diego	California	Active	
**Nu Sigma Zeta**	May 8, 1987	Harrisburg	Pennsylvania	Active	
**Xi Sigma Zeta**		Forrest City	Arkansas	Active	
**Omicron Sigma Zeta**	September 5, 1993	Baton Rouge	Louisiana	Active	
**Pi Sigma Zeta**	August 6, 1997	Cincinnati	Ohio	Active	
**Rho Sigma Zeta**	1999–2000; February 6, 2015	Erie	Pennsylvania	Active	
Sigma Sigma Zeta		Hudson County	New Jersey	Inactive	
**Tau Sigma Zeta**		Fresno	California	Active	
**Upsilon Sigma Zeta**		Leesville	Louisiana	Active	
**Phi Sigma Zeta**		Camilla	Georgia	Active	
**Chi Sigma Zeta**		Johnson City	Tennessee	Active	
**Psi Sigma Zeta**		Germantown	Tennessee	Active	
**Omega Sigma Zeta**	2013	Carthage	Mississippi	Active	
**Alpha Tau Zeta**		Galveston	Texas	Active	
**Beta Tau Zeta**	February 24, 1946	Miami and Miami-Dade County	Florida	Active	
**Gamma Tau Zeta**	November 20, 1948	Pensacola	Florida	Active	
**Delta Tau Zeta**		Kingstree	South Carolina	Active	
**Epsilon Tau Zeta**		Macon	Georgia	Active	
**Zeta Tau Zeta** (see **Zeta Zeta** and Beta Iota Zeta first)	June 20, 1966	Metropolitan Chicago	Illinois	Active	
Eta Tau Zeta				Inactive	
Theta Tau Zeta				Inactive	
**Iota Tau Zeta**		Elloree	South Carolina	Active	
**Kappa Tau Zeta**	1981	Greenville	Mississippi	Active	
Lambda Tau Zeta				Inactive	
**Mu Tau Zeta**	April 26, 1984	Speedway	Indiana	Active	
**Nu Tau Zeta**		Kernersville	North Carolina	Active	
**Xi Tau Zeta**		Atlantic County	New Jersey	Active	
Omicron Tau Zeta				Inactive	
**Pi Tau Zeta**		Tuscaloosa	Alabama	Active	
**Rho Tau Zeta**	April 14, 2000	Passaic County and Morris County	New Jersey	Active	
**Sigma Tau Zeta**	2002	Lufkin and Nacogdoches	Texas	Active	
**Tau Tau Zeta**		Wake County	North Carolina	Active	
**Upsilon Tau Zeta**	2006	Batesville	Mississippi	Active	
**Phi Tau Zeta**		Cheyenne	Wyoming	Active	
**Chi Tau Zeta**		Leesburg	Virginia	Active	
**Psi Tau Zeta**		Carlsbad	California	Active	
**Omega Tau Zeta**	2013	Brandon	Mississippi	Active	
**Alpha Upsilon Zeta**	February 16, 1942	Tallahassee and Leon County	Florida	Active	
**Beta Upsilon Zeta**		Dothan	Alabama	Active	
**Gamma Upsilon Zeta**		Fayetteville	North Carolina	Active	
**Delta Upsilon Zeta**		Waco	Texas	Active	
Epsilon Upsilon Zeta first (see **Mu Rho Zeta**)	196x–197x;	Akron	Ohio	Reassigned	(Note: The Akron chapter was re-established in 1984 as Mu Rho Zeta.)
**Epsilon Upsilon Zeta**		Talladega	Alabama	Active	
**Zeta Upsilon Zeta**	1966	Holly Springs	Mississippi	Active	
**Eta Upsilon Zeta**	October 11, 1974	Fort Wayne	Indiana	Active	
**Theta Upsilon Zeta**			Tennessee	Active	
Iota Upsilon Zeta				Inactive	
**Kappa Upsilon Zeta**	1983	Buffalo	New York	Active	
Lambda Upsilon Zeta				Inactive	
**Mu Upsilon Zeta**	October 22, 2005	St. Charles Parish, St. John the Baptist Parish, and St. James Parish	Louisiana	Active	
**Nu Upsilon Zeta**	October 10, 1987	Temple Terrace	Florida	Active	
Xi Upsilon Zeta				Inactive	
Omicron Upsilon Zeta				Inactive	
**Pi Upsilon Zeta**	April 8, 2008	Loudoun County	Virginia	Active	
**Rho Upsilon Zeta**	December 18, 1998	Cobb County and north Fulton County	Georgia	Active	
**Sigma Upsilon Zeta**	April 18, 2015	Opelousas	Louisiana	Active	
**Tau Upsilon Zeta**	2004	Clinton	Mississippi	Active	
**Upsilon Upsilon Zeta**		New Iberia	Louisiana	Active	
**Phi Upsilon Zeta**	2008	Sterling	Virginia	Active	
**Chi Upsilon Zeta**		Enterprise	Alabama	Active	
**Psi Upsilon Zeta**		Hoover	Alabama	Active	
**Omega Upsilon Zeta**		Saint Thomas	United States Virgin Islands	Active	
**Alpha Phi Zeta**	February 27, 1942	Richmond	Virginia	Active	
**Beta Phi Zeta**	April 13, 1946	Guthrie	Oklahoma	Active	
**Gamma Phi Zeta**	November 20, 1948	Polk County	Florida	Active	
**Delta Phi Zeta**	1952	Trotwood	Ohio	Active	
**Epsilon Phi Zeta**	1948	Oakland and Berkeley	California	Active	
**Zeta Phi Zeta**		Alexandria	Louisiana	Active	
**Eta Phi Zeta**	July 19, 1974	Chapel Hill	North Carolina	Active	
**Theta Phi Zeta**	1977	Mound Bayou	Mississippi	Active	
Iota Phi Zeta				Inactive	
**Kappa Phi Zeta**	May 15, 1981	Providence	Rhode Island	Active	
Lambda Phi Zeta				Inactive	
Mu Phi Zeta				Inactive	
**Nu Phi Zeta**		Smithtown and Suffolk County	New York	Active	
**Xi Phi Zeta**		Pompano Beach	Florida	Active	
**Omicron Phi Zeta**	March 26, 1994	Washington	District of Columbia	Active	
Pi Phi Zeta				Inactive	
**Rho Phi Zeta**	2000	Liberty	Mississippi	Active	
**Sigma Phi Zeta**	November 2, 2002	Waukegan and Lake County	Illinois	Active	
**Tau Phi Zeta**	2004	Canton	Mississippi	Active	
**Phi Phi Zeta**	May 26, 2007	Jasper County	South Carolina	Active	
**Chi Phi Zeta**	October 31, 2009	Seminole County	Florida	Active	
**Psi Phi Zeta**		Spring Hill	Tennessee	Active	
**Omega Phi Zeta**	May 18, 2013	Charlottesville	Virginia	Active	
**Alpha Chi Zeta**		Beaumont	Texas	Active	
Beta Chi Zeta				Inactive	
Gamma Chi Zeta				Inactive	
**Delta Chi Zeta**	1960	Fayette	Mississippi	Active	
**Epsilon Chi Zeta**	September 15, 1957	Florence	South Carolina	Active	
**Zeta Chi Zeta**	April 15, 1967	Goldsboro	North Carolina	Active	
**Eta Chi Zeta**	1974–199x ?, April 7, 2005	Joliet	Illinois	Active	
**Theta Chi Zeta**		Thomasville	Georgia	Active	
**Iota Chi Zeta**	October 17, 1979	Cambridge and Dorchester County	Maryland	Active	
**Kappa Chi Zeta**		Walterboro	South Carolina	Active	
Lambda Chi Zeta				Inactive	
**Mu Chi Zeta**	1985	Oxford	Mississippi	Active	
**Nu Chi Zeta**	December 12, 1987	Saint Croix	United States Virgin Islands	Active	
**Xi Chi Zeta**		Hollywood	Florida	Active	
**Omicron Chi Zeta**	April 15, 1994	Abingdon and Hartford County	Maryland	Active	
**Pi Chi Zeta**		Lowell	Arkansas	Active	
**Rho Chi Zeta**	May 26, 2000	Chester	Pennsylvania	Active	
**Sigma Chi Zeta**		Murfreesboro	Tennessee	Active	
Tau Chi Zeta				Inactive	
**Upsilon Chi Zeta**	August 6, 2006	Rockford	Illinois	Active	
**Phi Chi Zeta**		Wintervile	Georgia	Active	
Chi Chi Zeta				Inactive	
Psi Chi Zeta				Inactive	
**Omega Chi Zeta**		Christiansburg	Virginia	Active	
**Alpha Psi Zeta**	1955	Los Angeles	California	Active	(Note: Chapter formed by the merger of Beta Eta Zeta chapter and Gamma Sigma Zeta chapter.)
**Beta Psi Zeta**	February 20, 1947	Omaha	Nebraska	Active	
Gamma Psi Zeta		Temple	Texas	Inactive	
Delta Psi Zeta		Orange	Texas	Inactive	
**Epsilon Psi Zeta**		Greenwood	South Carolina	Active	
**Zeta Psi Zeta**	1967	Clarksdale	Mississippi	Active	
Eta Psi Zeta				Inactive	
**Theta Psi Zeta**	February 25, 1978	Panama City	Florida	Active	
Iota Psi Zeta			Tennessee	Inactive	
**Kappa Psi Zeta**	June 22, 1981	Sacramento	California	Active	
Lambda Psi Zeta		Kalamazoo	Michigan	Inactive	
Mu Psi Zeta			Maryland	Inactive	
**Nu Psi Zeta**	March 8, 1987	Peekskill	New York	Active	
**Xi Psi Zeta**		Honolulu	Hawaii	Active	
Omicron Psi Zeta				Inactive	
**Pi Psi Zeta**		Magnolia	Arkansas	Active	
Rho Psi Zeta		Westbury	New York	Inactive	
**Sigma Psi Zeta**	December 4, 2002	Capitol Heights and Prince George's County	Maryland	Active	
**Tau Psi Zeta**	September 19, 2004	Alsip	Illinois	Active	
**Upsilon Psi Zeta**	2006	Oak Park	Michigan	Active	
**Phi Psi Zeta**	May 4, 2008	Lewisville	Texas	Active	
Chi Psi Zeta		Culver City	California	Inactive	
**Psi Psi Zeta**	June 15, 2011	Chicago	Illinois	Active	
**Omega Psi Zeta**	2013	Ruleville	Mississippi	Active	
**Alpha Omega Zeta**	May 1, 1942	Petersburg	Virginia	Active	
**Beta Omega Zeta**		Albany	Georgia	Active	
**Gamma Omega Zeta**	April 1948	north Houston	Texas	Active	
**Delta Omega Zeta**		Huntsville	Alabama	Active	
**Epsilon Omega Zeta**	May 4, 1958	West Chester	Pennsylvania	Active	
**Zeta Omega Zeta**	1967	Saginaw	Michigan	Active	
**Eta Omega Zeta**	March 1975	Athens	Georgia	Active	
**Theta Omega Zeta**		Livingston	Alabama	Active	
Iota Omega Zeta				Inactive	
**Kappa Omega Zeta**	July 31, 1981	Bala Cynwyd	Pennsylvania	Active	
Lambda Omega Zeta		Rockledge	Florida	Inactive	
**Mu Omega Zeta**		Natchitoches	Louisiana	Active	
**Nu Omega Zeta**		Arkadelphia	Arkansas	Active	
**Xi Omega Zeta**		Warner Robins	Georgia	Active	
**Omicron Omega Zeta**		Lubbock	Texas	Active	
**Pi Omega Zeta**	March 18, 1998	Round Rock	Texas	Active	
**Rho Omega Zeta**	July 2, 2000	North Shore of Long Island: Manhasset, Great Neck, New Hyde Park, North Hills, Port Washington, and East Williston	New York	Active	
**Sigma Omega Zeta**	March 14, 2003	Clayton County	Georgia	Active	
**Tau Omega Zeta**	September 23, 2004	Towson and Baltimore County	Maryland	Active	
**Upsilon Omega Zeta**	December 21, 2006	Fishers	Indiana	Active	
**Phi Omega Zeta**	May 9, 2008	Coram and western Suffolk County	New York	Active	
**Chi Omega Zeta**		Chico	California	Active	
**Psi Omega Zeta**	June 24, 2011	Rochester	New York	Active	
**Omega Omega Zeta**		Camden	Alabama	Active	
**Alpha Alpha Alpha Zeta**	September 21, 2013	Fredericksburg	Virginia	Active	
**Alpha Alpha Beta Zeta**	August 26, 2013	DeRidder	Louisiana	Active	
**Alpha Alpha Gamma Zeta**	October 22, 2013	Phenix City	Alabama	Active	
**Alpha Alpha Delta Zeta**		Beloit	Wisconsin	Active	
**Alpha Alpha Epsilon Zeta**		Pittsboro	North Carolina	Active	
**Alpha Alpha Zeta Zeta**	2014	Vicksburg	Mississippi	Active	
**Alpha Alpha Eta Zeta**		London	England	Active	
**Alpha Alpha Iota Zeta**	March 14, 2014	Murray	Kentucky	Active	
**Alpha Alpha Kappa Zeta**	April 1, 2014	Newnan	Georgia	Active	
**Alpha Alpha Lambda Zeta**	May 23, 2014	Abu Dhab	United Arab Emirates	Active	
**Alpha Alpha Mu Zeta**	September 13, 2014	Kenton County	Kentucky	Active	
**Alpha Alpha Nu Zeta**		Augusta	Arkansas	Active	
**Alpha Alpha Xi Zeta**	April 24, 1993	Charleston	West Virginia	Active	
**Alpha Alpha Omicron Zeta**	January 15, 2015	Philadelphia	Pennsylvania	Active	
**Alpha Alpha Pi Zeta**	February 12, 2015	El Dorado	Arkansas	Active	
**Alpha Alpha Rho Zeta**		Norwalk	Connecticut	Active	
**Alpha Alpha Sigma Zeta**		Aurora	Illinois	Active	
Alpha Alpha Tau Zeta		Tunica	Mississippi	Inactive	
**Alpha Alpha Upsilon Zeta**	May 2, 2015	Manhattan	New York	Active	
**Alpha Alpha Phi Zeta**	November 25, 2016	Laurinburg	North Carolina	Active	
**Alpha Alpha Chi Zeta**	July 21, 2015	Monmouth County and Ocean County	New Jersey	Active	
**Alpha Alpha Psi Zeta**	2015	Hazlehurst	Mississippi	Active	
**Alpha Alpha Omega Zeta**		south Westchester County and West Bronx	New York	Active	
**Beta Alpha Alpha Zeta**	2015	Meridian	Mississippi	Active	
**Beta Alpha Beta Zeta**	October 28, 2015	Leonardtown	Maryland	Active	
**Beta Alpha Gamma Zeta**		Palmdale	California	Active	
**Beta Alpha Delta Zeta**	2016	Vaiden	Mississippi	Active	
**Beta Alpha Epsilon Zeta**		Clewiston, Moore Haven, and Okeechobee	Florida	Active	
**Beta Alpha Zeta Zeta**		Springfield	Massachusetts	Active	
Beta Alpha Eta Zeta				Inactive	
**Beta Alpha Theta Zeta**	March 30, 2016	Menifee	California	Active	
**Beta Alpha Iota Zeta**	April 6, 2016	Crawfordville	Florida	Active	
**Beta Alpha Kappa Zeta**	2016	Winona	Mississippi	Active	
**Beta Alpha Lambda Zeta**		Dyersburg	Tennessee	Active	
**Beta Alpha Mu Zeta**	June 29, 2016	Freeport	Grand Bahama, The Bahamas	Active	
**Beta Alpha Nu Zeta**		Barataria	Trinidad and Tobago	Active	
**Beta Alpha Xi Zeta**		Louisville	Kentucky	Active	
**Beta Alpha Omicron Zeta**		Chesapeake	Virginia	Active	
**Beta Alpha Pi Zeta**	October 16, 2016	Accomack County and Northampton County	Virginia	Active	
**Beta Alpha Rho Zeta**		Somerset County	New Jersey	Active	
**Beta Alpha Sigma Zeta**	November 20, 2016	Frederick	Maryland	Active	
**Beta Alpha Tau Zeta**	November 20, 2016	White Marsh and Baltimore County	Maryland	Active	
**Beta Alpha Upsilon Zeta**		Sawyerville	Alabama	Active	
**Beta Alpha Phi Zeta**		Arkansas City	Arkansas	Active	
**Beta Alpha Chi Zeta**		Dublin	Georgia	Active	
**Beta Alpha Psi Zeta**	March 28, 2017	St. Augustine, Palm Coast, Hasting, Vendra, and Clay County	Florida	Active	
**Beta Alpha Omega Zeta**	April 18, 2017	Moody	Alabama	Active	
**Gamma Alpha Alpha Zeta**		Selma	Alabama	Active	
**Gamma Alpha Beta Zeta**	July 29, 2017	Abington	Pennsylvania	Active	
**Gamma Alpha Gamma Zeta**		New Roads	Louisiana	Active	
**Gamma Alpha Delta Zeta**		Franklin and Southampton County	Virginia	Active	
**Gamma Alpha Epsilon Zeta**		Irvine	California	Active	
**Gamma Alpha Zeta Zeta**	February 28, 2018	Mount Pleasant	Michigan	Active	
**Gamma Alpha Eta Zeta**	April 19, 2018	Montgomery County	Maryland	Active	
**Gamma Alpha Theta Zeta**		Aurora	Colorado	Active	
**Gamma Alpha Iota Zeta**		Northern Colorado	Colorado	Active	
**Gamma Alpha Kappa Zeta**	July 1, 2019	Cleveland Heights	Ohio	Active	
**Gamma Alpha Lambda Zeta**		Junction City	Kansas	Active	
**Gamma Alpha Mu Zeta**		Tortola	Virgin Islands	Active	
**Gamma Alpha Nu Zeta**	August 14, 2019	Nashua	New Hampshire	Active	
**Gamma Alpha Xi Zeta**	October 24, 2019	Troy	Alabama	Active	
**Gamma Alpha Omicron Zeta**	March 9, 2020	State College	Pennsylvania	Active	
**Gamma Alpha Pi Zeta**	June 12, 2020	Bergen County	New Jersey	Active	
**Gamma Alpha Rho Zeta**	July 16, 2020	Odessa	Delaware	Active	
**Gamma Alpha Sigma Zeta**	August 29, 2020	Accra	Ghana	Active	
**Gamma Alpha Tau Zeta**		Penn Hills	Pennsylvania	Active	
**Gamma Alpha Upsilon Zeta**		Crestview and Okaloosa County	Florida	Active	
**Gamma Alpha Phi Zeta**		Duplin County	North Carolina	Active	
**Gamma Alpha Chi Zeta**		Quad Counties (Comal, Guadalupe, Hays, and Caldwell counties)	Texas	Active	
**Gamma Alpha Psi Zeta**	December 15, 2020	Kankakee	Illinois	Active	
**Gamma Alpha Omega Zeta**		North Collin County Group A (Anna, Celina, Farmersville, Lavon, McKinney, Melissa, Murphy, Princeton, Sachse, Weston, and Wiley)	Texas	Active	
**Delta Alpha Alpha Zeta**		North Collin County Group B (Allen, Fairview, McKinney, Melissa, and Prosper)	Texas	Active	
**Delta Alpha Beta Zeta**	March 10, 2021	Milford and Sussex County	Delaware	Active	
**Delta Alpha Gamma Zeta**		Liverpool	New York	Active	
**Delta Alpha Delta Zeta**	August 20, 2021	Clay County	Florida	Active	
**Delta Alpha Epsilon Zeta**	August 2021	Collier County	Florida	Active	
**Delta Alpha Zeta Zeta**	October 16, 2021	Pasco County	Florida	Active	
**Delta Alpha Eta Zeta**		McDuffie County	Georgia	Active	
**Delta Alpha Theta Zeta**		north Tarrant County ( Haslet, Grapevine, Keller, Southlake, and Saginaw)	Texas	Active	
**Delta Alpha Iota Zeta**	May 2022	Reidsville and Rockingham County	North Carolina	Active	
**Delta Alpha Kappa Zeta**		Fort Bend County and western Houston	Texas	Active	
**Delta Alpha Lambda Zeta**		West Brooklyn (Park Slope, Bensonhurst, Clinton Hill, Sunset Park, Bay Ridge, Fort Greene, Red Hook, Gowanus, Downtown Brooklyn, and Coney Island)	New York	Active	
**Delta Alpha Mu Zeta**		West Orange County	Florida	Active	
**Delta Alpha Nu Zeta**	August 14, 2019	Northern New England	Vermont, Maine, and New Hampshire	Active	
**Delta Alpha Xi Zeta**	October 24, 2019	Troy	Alabama	Active	
**Delta Alpha Omicron Zeta**	2020	State College	Pennsylvania	Active	
**Delta Alpha Pi Zeta**	June 12, 2020	Bergen County and Essex County	New Jersey	Active	
**Delta Alpha Rho Zeta**	July 16, 2020	southern New Castle County	Delaware	Active	
