= Hog Branch =

Stream in the U.S. state of Missouri

Hog Branch is a stream in Bates County, Missouri and Linn County, Kansas. It is a tributary of Mulberry Creek.

The stream headwaters are in eastern Linn County, Kansas, just west of the Missouri-Kansas border at 38°18′05″N 94°36′49″W and it flows southeast into Bates County, Missouri. The stream flows southeast to its confluence with Mulberry Creek about 1.5 miles (2.4 km) northeast of Amoret at 38°16′08″N 94°33′52″W.

Hog Branch was named for the hogs along its course.

== See also ==
- List of rivers of Kansas
- List of rivers of Missouri
