= Round O, South Carolina =

Unincorporated community in South Carolina, US

Coordinates: 32°56′14″N 80°32′27″W

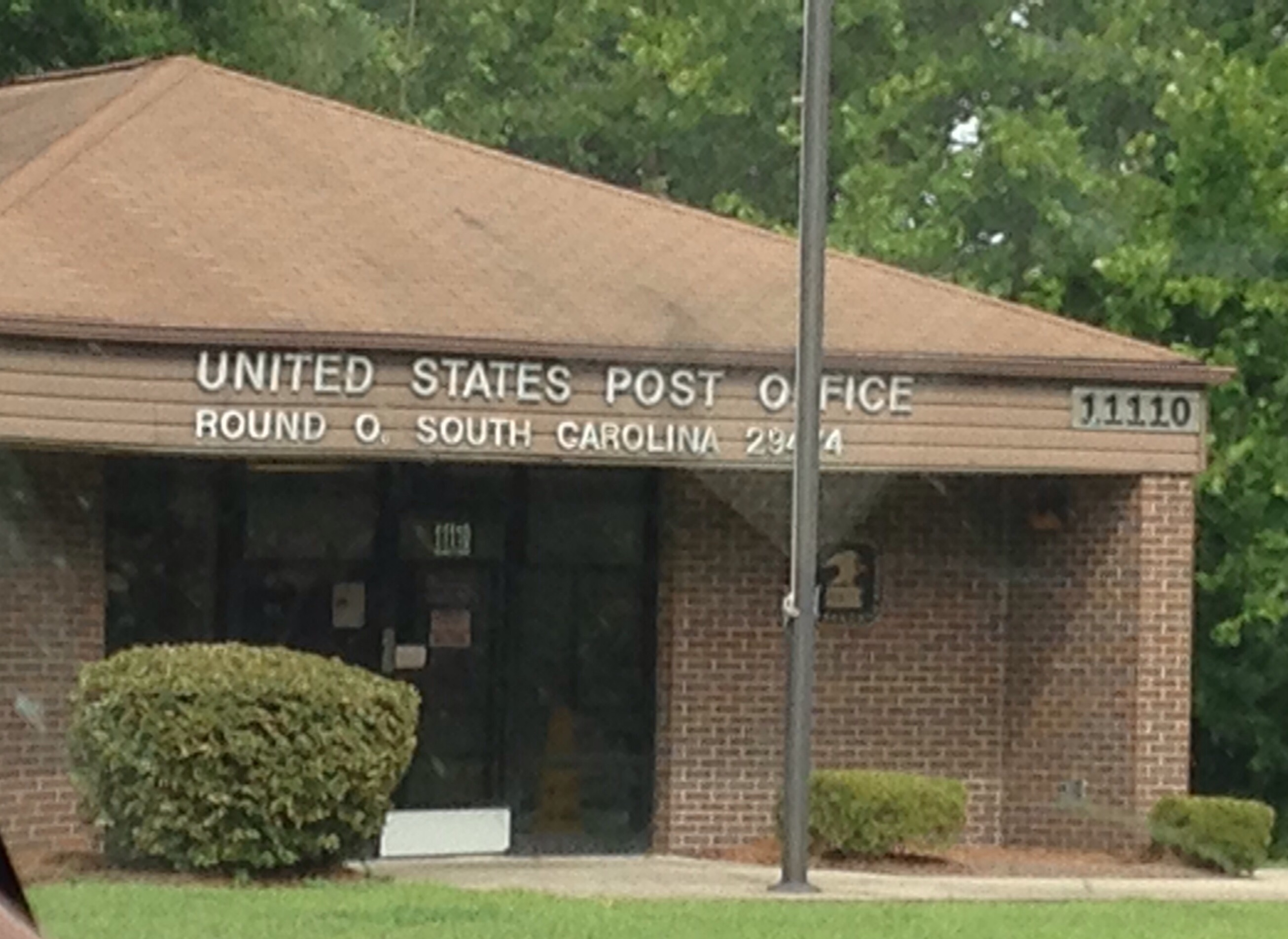
Round O, South Carolina Post Office on July 5, 2015

Round O (formerly also called Round) is an unincorporated community in Colleton County, South Carolina, United States. The population of Round O is 2,136 people. Its elevation is 36 feet (11 m). It is located near the intersection of Cottageville Highway (US 17 Alt.) and Round O Road.

The name Round O was initially seen as "Round O Creek" in 1709; according to oral traditions, a "famous Indian chief" with a difficult name had a "purple medallion tattooed on his shoulder" and so was named Round O, after which the creek was named. In later retellings, this became a painted O on his torso. The name may simply be a misspelling of the unfamiliar surname Rondeau.

On J. G. W. De Brahm's 1757 "Map of South Carolina and a Part of Georgia," a round geographical feature labeled "Round O Savannah" is clearly visible west of the Edisto River in St. Bartholomew's Parish.
