= Amoret, Missouri =

- City
- Location of Amoret, Missouri
- Coordinates: 38°15′18″N 94°35′15″W
- Country: United States
- State: Missouri
- County: Bates
- Incorporated: 1930

Area
  - Total: 0.21 sq mi (0.55 km^{2})
  - Land: 0.21 sq mi (0.55 km^{2})
  - Water: 0 sq mi (0.00 km^{2})
- Elevation: 846 ft (258 m)

Population (2020)
  - Total: 133
  - Density: 622.1/sq mi (240.19/km^{2})
- Time zone: UTC-6 (Central (CST))
  - Summer (DST): UTC-5 (CDT)
- ZIP code: 64722
- Area code: 660
- FIPS code: 29-01072
- GNIS feature ID: 2393948

Amoret is a city in western Bates County, Missouri, and is part of the Kansas City metropolitan area within the United States. The population was 133 at the 2020 census.

== History ==
Amoret was platted in 1890, and possibly was named after the biblical Amorites. A post office called Amoret has been in operation since 1885.

== Geography ==
Amoret is located on Missouri Route 52 approximately 13 miles west of Butler and just over one mile east of the Missouri-Kansas border. Mulberry Creek flows past about one mile to the east and joins the Marais des Cygnes River about 2.5 miles to the southeast.

According to the United States Census Bureau, the city has a total area of 0.21 square miles (0.54 km^{2}), all land.

== Demographics ==
Historical population
| Census | Pop. | Note | %± |
|---|---|---|---|
| 1900 | 215 | | — |
| 1910 | 307 | | 42.8% |
| 1920 | 390 | | 27.0% |
| 1930 | 344 | | −11.8% |
| 1940 | 328 | | −4.7% |
| 1950 | 255 | | −22.3% |
| 1960 | 261 | | 2.4% |
| 1970 | 219 | | −16.1% |
| 1980 | 238 | | 8.7% |
| 1990 | 212 | | −10.9% |
| 2000 | 211 | | −0.5% |
| 2010 | 190 | | −10.0% |
| 2020 | 133 | | −30.0% |
U.S. Decennial Census

=== 2010 census ===
As of the census of 2010, there were 190 people, 77 households, and 50 families living in the city. The population density was 904.8 inhabitants per square mile (349.3/km^{2}). There were 96 housing units at an average density of 457.1 per square mile (176.5/km^{2}). The racial makeup of the city was 94.2% White, 0.5% African American, 0.5% Native American, 2.1% from other races, and 2.6% from two or more races. Hispanic or Latino of any race were 4.7% of the population.

There were 77 households, of which 29.9% had children under the age of 18 living with them, 44.2% were married couples living together, 13.0% had a female householder with no husband present, 7.8% had a male householder with no wife present, and 35.1% were non-families. 28.6% of all households were made up of individuals, and 15.6% had someone living alone who was 65 years of age or older. The average household size was 2.47 and the average family size was 3.02.

The median age in the city was 40.8 years. 23.7% of residents were under the age of 18; 5.8% were between the ages of 18 and 24; 27.3% were from 25 to 44; 27.9% were from 45 to 64; and 15.3% were 65 years of age or older. The gender makeup of the city was 48.4% male and 51.6% female.

=== 2000 census ===
As of the census of 2000, there were 211 people, 81 households, and 52 families living in the city. The population density was 980.2 inhabitants per square mile (378.5/km^{2}). There were 95 housing units at an average density of 441.3 per square mile (170.4/km^{2}). The racial makeup of the city was 98.10% White, and 1.90% from two or more races. Hispanic or Latino of any race were 0.95% of the population.

There were 81 households, out of which 32.1% had children under the age of 18 living with them, 45.7% were married couples living together, 11.1% had a female householder with no husband present, and 35.8% were non-families. 33.3% of all households were made up of individuals, and 17.3% had someone living alone who was 65 years of age or older. The average household size was 2.60 and the average family size was 3.33.

In the city the population was spread out, with 28.9% under the age of 18, 10.4% from 18 to 24, 23.2% from 25 to 44, 21.8% from 45 to 64, and 15.6% who were 65 years of age or older. The median age was 37 years. For every 100 females, there were 97.2 males. For every 100 females age 18 and over, there were 94.8 males.

The median income for a household in the city was $26,250, and the median income for a family was $34,063. Males had a median income of $22,188 versus $28,056 for females. The per capita income for the city was $10,071. About 20.8% of families and 23.9% of the population were below the poverty line, including 30.3% of those under the age of eighteen and 8.0% of those 65 or over.

== Education ==
It is in the Miami R-I School District. Miami High School is in proximity to Amoret and has an Amoret post office address. The school mascot is the Eagles.

Metropolitan Community College has the Miami school district area in its service area, but not its in-district taxation area.
