= Tom Williams House =

Historic house in South Carolina, United States

- U.S. National Register of Historic Places
- Location within South Carolina Location within the United States
- Location: 0.25 miles west of Williams on South Carolina Highway 362, near Williams, South Carolina
- Coordinates: 33°2′16″N 80°51′14″W
- Area: 1 acre (0.40 ha)
- Built: 1914
- NRHP reference No.: 73001706
- Added to NRHP: April 26, 1973

Tom Williams House is a historic home located near Williams, Colleton County, South Carolina. The house dates to the 19th century, and is a one-story, clapboard dogtrot style house on brick piers and with a spraddle roof. It features a front porch supported by six tapered, hand-hewn columns. The house was owned by and housed the family of Tom Williams, a much respected middle class farmer who donated land for the town that was named in his honor. In 1914, it was used as a tenant house for the Warren and Griffin Lumber Company.

It was listed in the National Register of Historic Places in 1973.
