= Wilsey, Texas =

- Unincorporated community
- Location within the state of Texas Wilsey (the United States)
- Coordinates: 34°27′04.3″N 102°57′20.5″W 34.682451, -102.609464
- Country: United States
- State: Texas
- County: Parmer
- Elevation: 3,802 ft (1,159 m)
- Time zone: UTC-6 (Central (CST))
  - Summer (DST): UTC-5 (CDT)
- ZIP codes: 79325

Wilsey is an unincorporated community in Parmer County, Texas, United States. It lies on U.S. Route 60. The settlement is named for F.W. Wilsey, who served as land commissioner handling the sale of former XIT Ranch lands from 1905–1909.
