= Rondeau =

Rondeau may refer to:

== In the arts ==
- Rondeau (forme fixe), a medieval and Renaissance poetic and musical form
- Rondo, also spelled "rondeau", a musical form from the 18th century to the present
- Fanfare-Rondeau, by Jean-Joseph Mouret
- An 1838 poem by Leigh Hunt, better known as "Jenny kiss'd Me"

== People ==
- Ann E. Rondeau (born 1951), former US admiral
- Bob Rondeau (born 1949/50), former University of Washington sports announcer
- Charles Rondeau (playwright), 19th-century French playwright
- Claudius Rondeau (1695–1739), British Minister Resident to Russia from 1731 to 1739
- Gérard Rondeau (1953–2016), French photographer
- Jean Rondeau (racing driver) (1946–1985), French automobile racer and constructor
- Jean Rondeau (musician) (born 1991), French harpsichordist
- Jim Rondeau (born 1959), politician in Manitoba
- José Rondeau (1773–1844), 19th century Argentine general and politician
- Noah John Rondeau (1883–1967), Adirondack hermit

== Other ==
- Rondeau Provincial Park, in southwestern Ontario
