= Lodge, South Carolina =

- Town
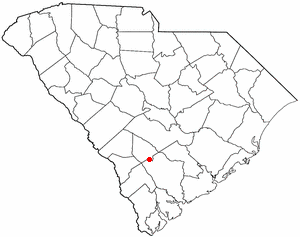
- Location of Lodge, South Carolina
- Coordinates: 33°04′04″N 80°57′13″W
- Country: United States
- State: South Carolina
- County: Colleton

Area
  - Total: 3.14 sq mi (8.14 km^{2})
  - Land: 3.14 sq mi (8.14 km^{2})
  - Water: 0 sq mi (0.00 km^{2})
- Elevation: 112 ft (34 m)

Population (2020)
  - Total: 82
  - Density: 26.1/sq mi (10.07/km^{2})
- Time zone: UTC-5 (Eastern (EST))
  - Summer (DST): UTC-4 (EDT)
- ZIP code: 29082
- Area codes: 843, 854
- FIPS code: 45-42280
- GNIS feature ID: 2406037

Lodge is a town in Colleton County, South Carolina, United States. As of the 2020 census, Lodge had a population of 82.

== Geography ==
Lodge is located in northwestern Colleton County at the intersection of South Carolina Highways 64 and 217. SC 64 leads 21 miles (34 km) southeast to Walterboro, the county seat, and 4 miles (6 km) northwest to Ehrhardt, while SC 217 leads east 8 miles (13 km) to Smoaks. According to the United States Census Bureau, Lodge has a total area of 3.1 square miles (8.1 km^{2}), all land.

== Demographics ==
Historical population
Census	Pop.	Note	%±
1910	263		—
1920	315		19.8%
1930	290		−7.9%
1940	242		−16.6%
1950	316		30.6%
1960	181		−42.7%
1970	168		−7.2%
1980	145		−13.7%
1990	147		1.4%
2000	114		−22.4%
2010	120		5.3%
2020	82		−31.7%
U.S. Decennial Census

As of the census of 2000, there were 114 people, 50 households, and 37 families residing in the town. The population density was 36.3 inhabitants per square mile (14.0/km^{2}). There were 59 housing units at an average density of 18.8 per square mile (7.3/km^{2}). The racial makeup of the town was 89.47% White, 3.51% African American, 7.02% from other races. Hispanic or Latino of any race were 7.02% of the population.

There were 50 households, out of which 18.0% had children under the age of 18 living with them, 60.0% were married couples living together, 10.0% had a female householder with no husband present, and 26.0% were non-families. 22.0% of all households were made up of individuals, and 16.0% had someone living alone who was 65 years of age or older. The average household size was 2.28 and the average family size was 2.57.

In the town, the population was spread out, with 14.0% under the age of 18, 5.3% from 18 to 24, 33.3% from 25 to 44, 28.9% from 45 to 64, and 18.4% who were 65 years of age or older. The median age was 43 years. For every 100 females, there were 107.3 males. For every 100 females age 18 and over, there were 100.0 males.

The median income for a household in the town was $35,625, and the median income for a family was $38,906. Males had a median income of $33,750 versus $29,063 for females. The per capita income for the town was $13,390. There were 18.9% of families and 17.2% of the population living below the poverty line, including 31.8% of under eighteens and none of those over 64.
