= Smoaks, South Carolina =

- Town
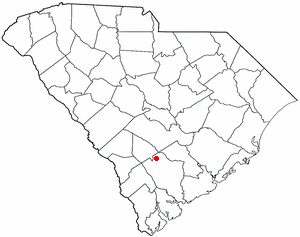
- Location of Smoaks, South Carolina
- Coordinates: 33°05′22″N 80°48′51″W
- Country: United States
- State: South Carolina
- County: Colleton

Area
  - Total: 1.63 sq mi (4.22 km^{2})
  - Land: 1.63 sq mi (4.22 km^{2})
  - Water: 0 sq mi (0.00 km^{2})
- Elevation: 102 ft (31 m)

Population (2020)
  - Total: 98
  - Density: 60.1/sq mi (23.21/km^{2})
- Time zone: UTC-5 (Eastern (EST))
  - Summer (DST): UTC-4 (EDT)
- ZIP code: 29481
- Area codes: 843, 854
- FIPS code: 45-67165
- GNIS feature ID: 2407355

Smoaks is a town in Colleton County, South Carolina, United States. As of the 2020 census, Smoaks had a population of 98.

== Geography ==
Smoaks is located in northern Colleton County. U.S. Route 21 passes through the town, leading north 28 miles (45 km) to Orangeburg and south 31 miles (50 km) to Yemassee. Walterboro, the Colleton County seat, is 18 miles (29 km) to the southeast via US 21 and South Carolina Highway 64. South Carolina Highway 217 crosses US 21 in the center of Smoaks, leading west 8 miles (13 km) to Lodge and east 11 miles (18 km) to Interstate 95 near Canadys.

According to the United States Census Bureau, Smoaks has a total area of 1.6 square miles (4.2 km^{2}), all land.

== Demographics ==
Historical population
Census	Pop.	Note	%±
1920	132		—
1930	176		33.3%
1940	168		−4.5%
1950	130		−22.6%
1960	145		11.5%
1970	155		6.9%
1980	165		6.5%
1990	142		−13.9%
2000	140		−1.4%
2010	126		−10.0%
2020	98		−22.2%
U.S. Decennial Census

As of the census of 2000, there were 140 people, 59 households, and 41 families residing in the town. The population density was 85.9 inhabitants per square mile (33.2/km^{2}). There were 68 housing units at an average density of 41.7 per square mile (16.1/km^{2}). The racial makeup of the town was 85.71% White, 11.43% African American, and 2.86% from two or more races.

There were 59 households, out of which 28.8% had children under the age of 18 living with them, 57.6% were married couples living together, 6.8% had a female householder with no husband present, and 30.5% were non-families. 23.7% of all households were made up of individuals, and 10.2% had someone living alone who was 65 years of age or older. The average household size was 2.37 and the average family size was 2.78.

In the town, the population was spread out, with 23.6% under the age of 18, 4.3% from 18 to 24, 24.3% from 25 to 44, 30.7% from 45 to 64, and 17.1% who were 65 years of age or older. The median age was 44 years. For every 100 females, there were 84.2 males. For every 100 females age 18 and over, there were 91.1 males.

The median income for a household in the town was $36,875, and the median income for a family was $39,250. Males had a median income of $38,438 versus $27,750 for females. The per capita income for the town was $20,097. There were 13.3% of families and 15.9% of the population living below the poverty line, including 18.5% of under eighteens and 9.4% of those over 64.
