= Mulberry Creek (Marais des Cygnes River tributary) =

Stream in Bates County, Missouri, U.S.

Coordinates: 38.2258585°N 94.5421764°W

Mulberry Creek is a stream in Bates County in the U.S. state of Missouri. It is a tributary of the Marais des Cygnes River.

Mulberry Creek owes its name to the abundant mulberry along its course.

== See also ==
- List of rivers of Missouri
