= Williams, South Carolina =

- Town
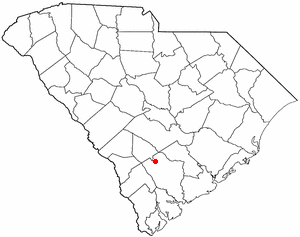
- Location of Williams, South Carolina
- Coordinates: 33°02′03″N 80°50′34″W
- Country: United States
- State: South Carolina
- County: Colleton

Area
  - Total: 0.85 sq mi (2.19 km^{2})
  - Land: 0.85 sq mi (2.19 km^{2})
  - Water: 0 sq mi (0.00 km^{2})
- Elevation: 105 ft (32 m)

Population (2020)
  - Total: 98
  - Density: 115.7/sq mi (44.66/km^{2})
- Time zone: UTC-5 (Eastern (EST))
  - Summer (DST): UTC-4 (EDT)
- ZIP code: 29493
- Area codes: 843, 854
- FIPS code: 45-77785
- GNIS feature ID: 2406887

Williams is a town in Colleton County, South Carolina, United States. As of the 2020 census, Williams had a population of 98.

== History ==
The Tom Williams House was listed in the National Register of Historic Places in 1973.

== Geography ==
Williams is located in northern Colleton County. It is 16 miles (26 km) northwest of Walterboro, the county seat.

According to the United States Census Bureau, the town has a total area of 0.85 square miles (2.2 km^{2}), all land.

== Demographics ==
Historical population
Census	Pop.	Note	%±
1940	218		—
1950	254		16.5%
1960	194		−23.6%
1970	201		3.6%
1980	205		2.0%
1990	188		−8.3%
2000	116		−38.3%
2010	117		0.9%
2020	98		−16.2%
U.S. Decennial Census

As of the census of 2000, there were 116 people, 48 households, and 33 families residing in the town. The population density was 147.5 inhabitants per square mile (57.0/km^{2}). There were 59 housing units at an average density of 75.0 per square mile (29.0/km^{2}). The racial makeup of the town was 53.45% White, 44.83% African American, 0.86% from other races, and 0.86% from two or more races. Hispanic or Latino of any race were 0.86% of the population.

There were 48 households, out of which 20.8% had children under the age of 18 living with them, 60.4% were married couples living together, 10.4% had a female householder with no husband present, and 29.2% were non-families. 25.0% of all households were made up of individuals, and 18.8% had someone living alone who was 65 years of age or older. The average household size was 2.42 and the average family size was 2.91.

In the town, the population was spread out, with 22.4% under the age of 18, 5.2% from 18 to 24, 19.8% from 25 to 44, 32.8% from 45 to 64, and 19.8% who were 65 years of age or older. The median age was 48 years. For every 100 females, there were 93.3 males. For every 100 females age 18 and over, there were 87.5 males.

The median income for a household in the town was $31,563, and the median income for a family was $33,333. Males had a median income of $24,821 versus $25,625 for females. The per capita income for the town was $17,691. There were 2.6% of families and 6.5% of the population living below the poverty line, including 6.1% of under eighteens and 4.3% of those over 64.
