= List of federal lands in South Carolina =

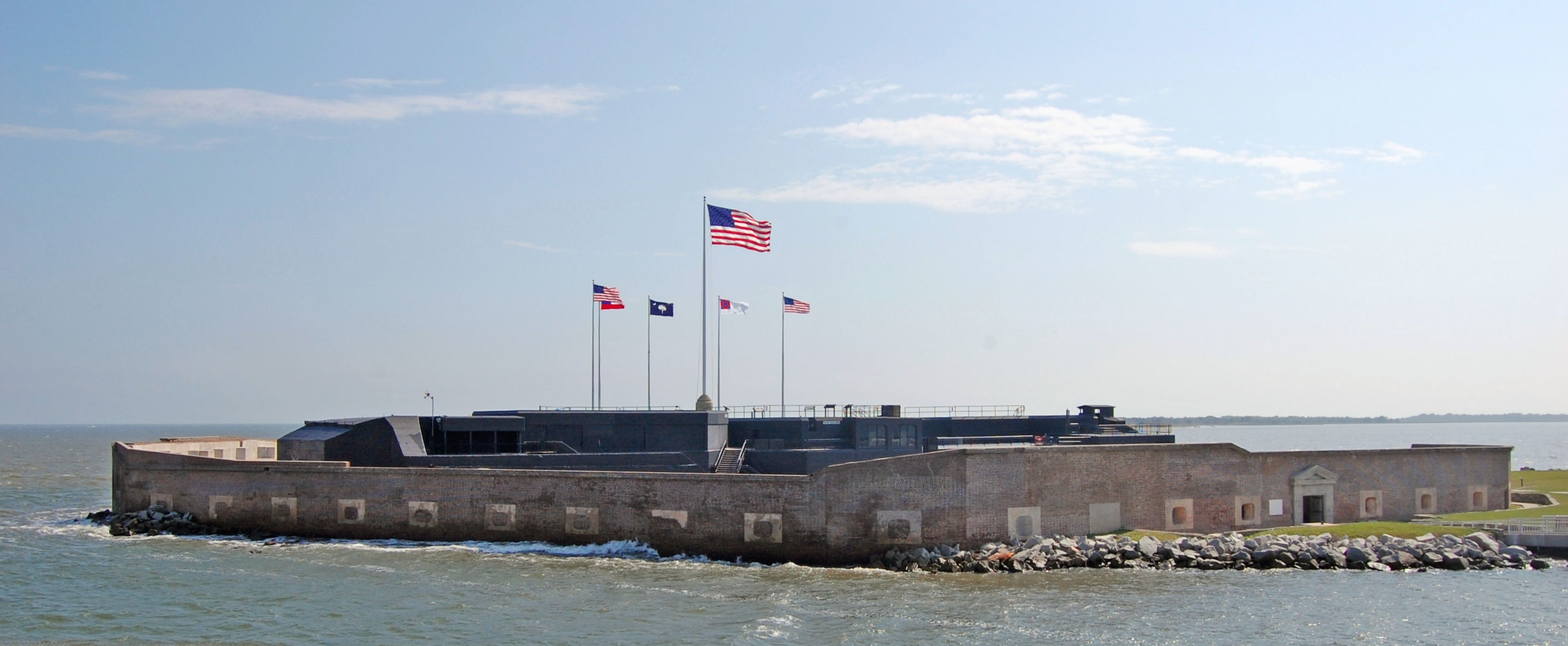
Fort Sumter National Monument in Charleston Harbor

Below are the following protected federal lands of the United States in the state of South Carolina.

== National Parks ==
- Congaree National Park

=== National Military Parks ===
- Kings Mountain National Military Park

== National Monuments ==
- Fort Sumter National Monument

== National Historical Sites ==
- Charles Pinckney National Historic Site
- Ninety Six National Historic Site

== National Battlefields ==
- Cowpens National Battlefield

== National Trails ==
=== National Historic Trails ===
- Overmountain Victory National Historic Trail

== National Forests ==
- Francis Marion National Forest
- Sumter National Forest

== National Wildlife Refuges ==
- Cape Romain National Wildlife Refuge
- Carolina Sandhills National Wildlife Refuge
- ACE Basin National Wildlife Refuge
- Pinckney Island National Wildlife Refuge
- Santee National Wildlife Refuge
- Savannah National Wildlife Refuge
- Tybee National Wildlife Refuge
- Waccamaw National Wildlife Refuge

== National Estuarine Research Preserve ==
- ACE Basin National Estuarine Research Preserve
- North Inlet-Winyah Bay National Estuarine Research Reserve

== Department of Energy ==
- Savannah River Site

== Gallery ==
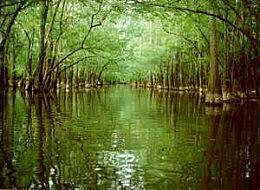
Cedar Creek in Congaree National Park

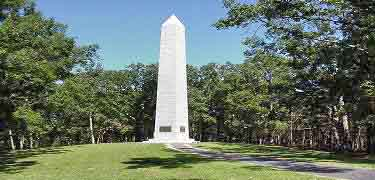
Kings Mountain Monument in Kings Mountain National Military Park

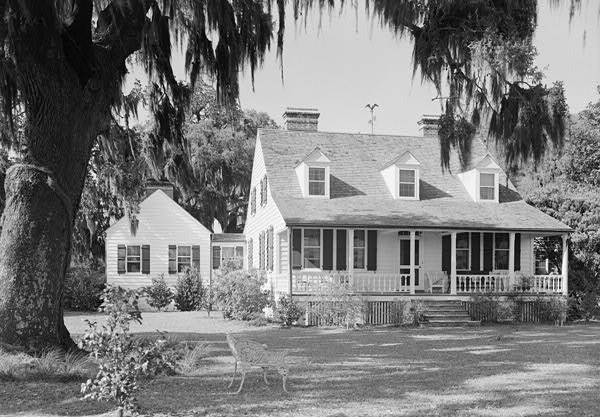
The Snee Farm House at Charles Pinckney National Historic Site

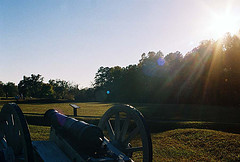
Sunset over the battlefield at Star Fort at Ninety Six National Historic Site

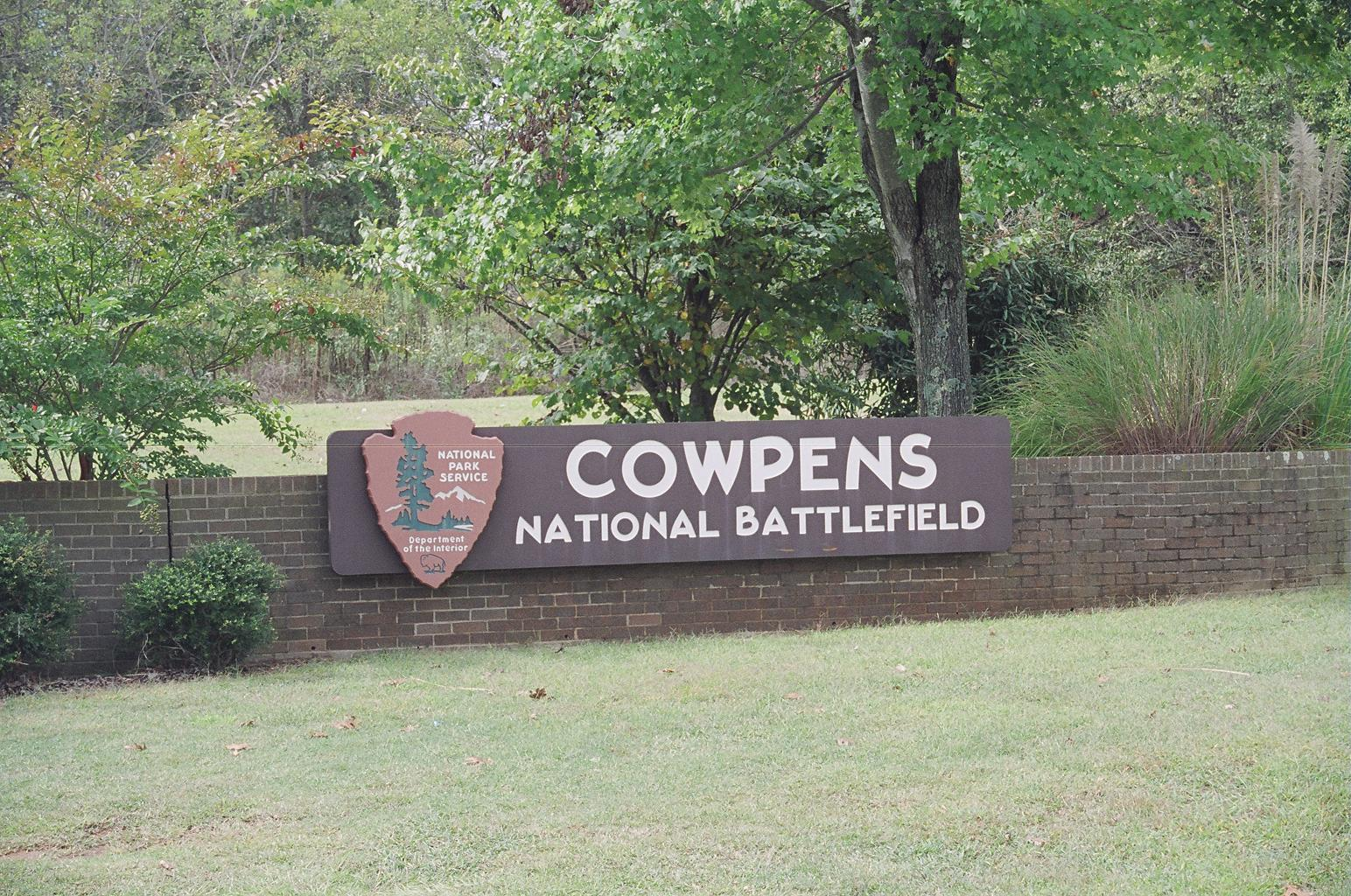
Main entrance to Cowpens National Battlefield

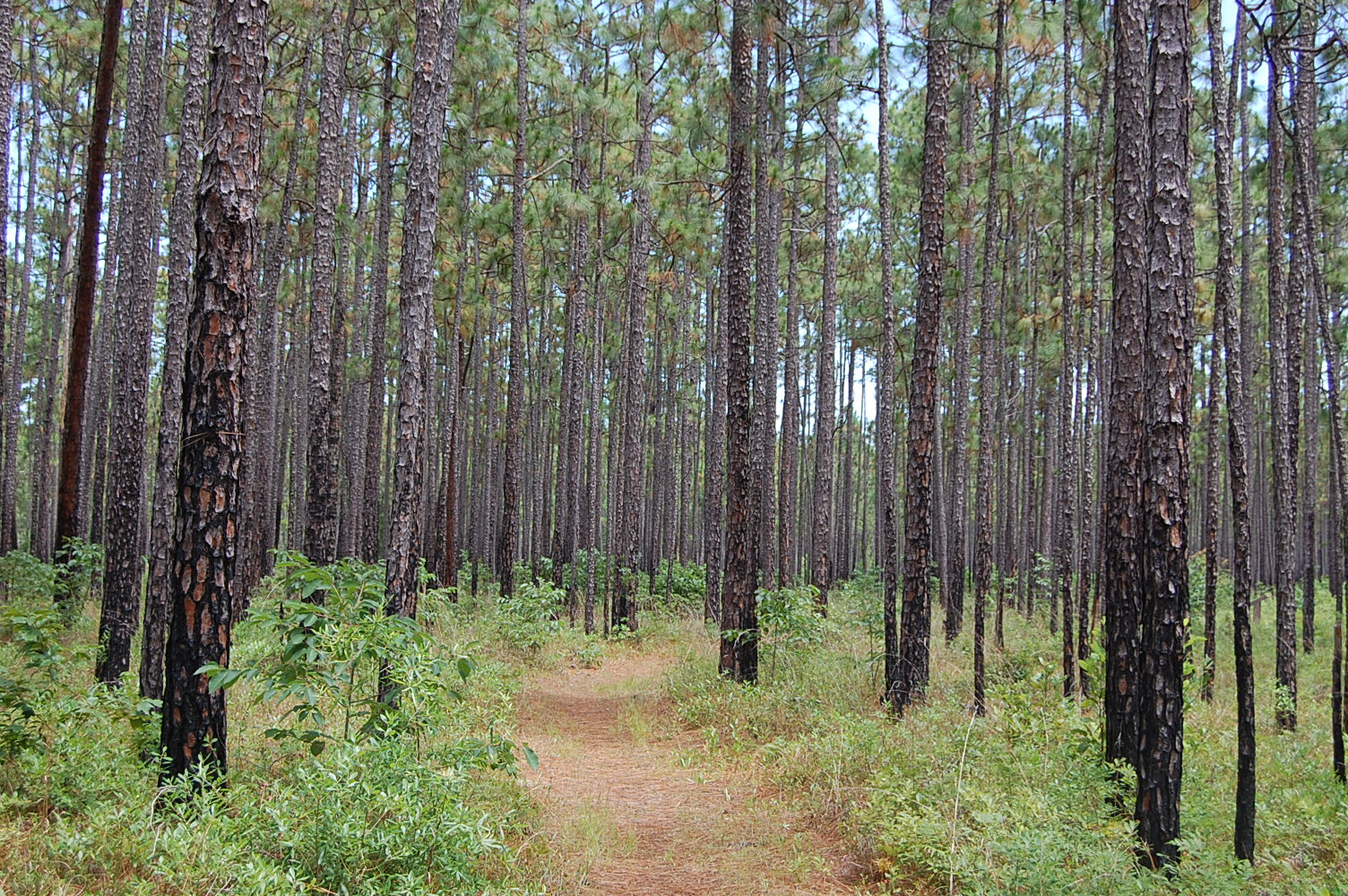
Palmetto Trail in Fracis Marion National Forest

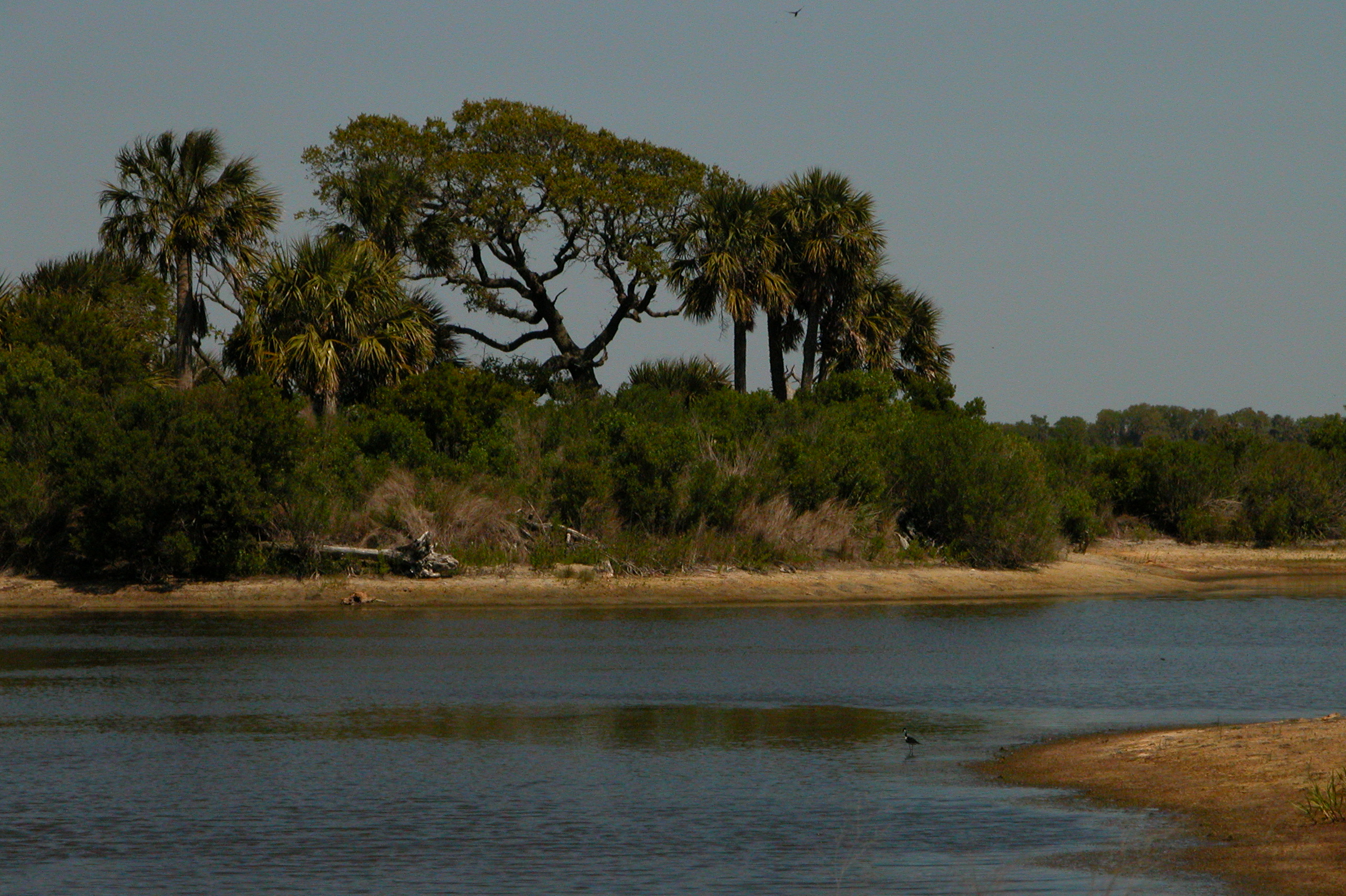
Jacks Creek at Bulls Island in Cape Romain National Wildlife Refuge

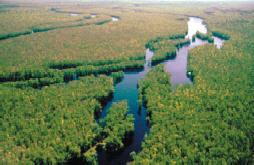
Waccamaw National Wildlife Refuge

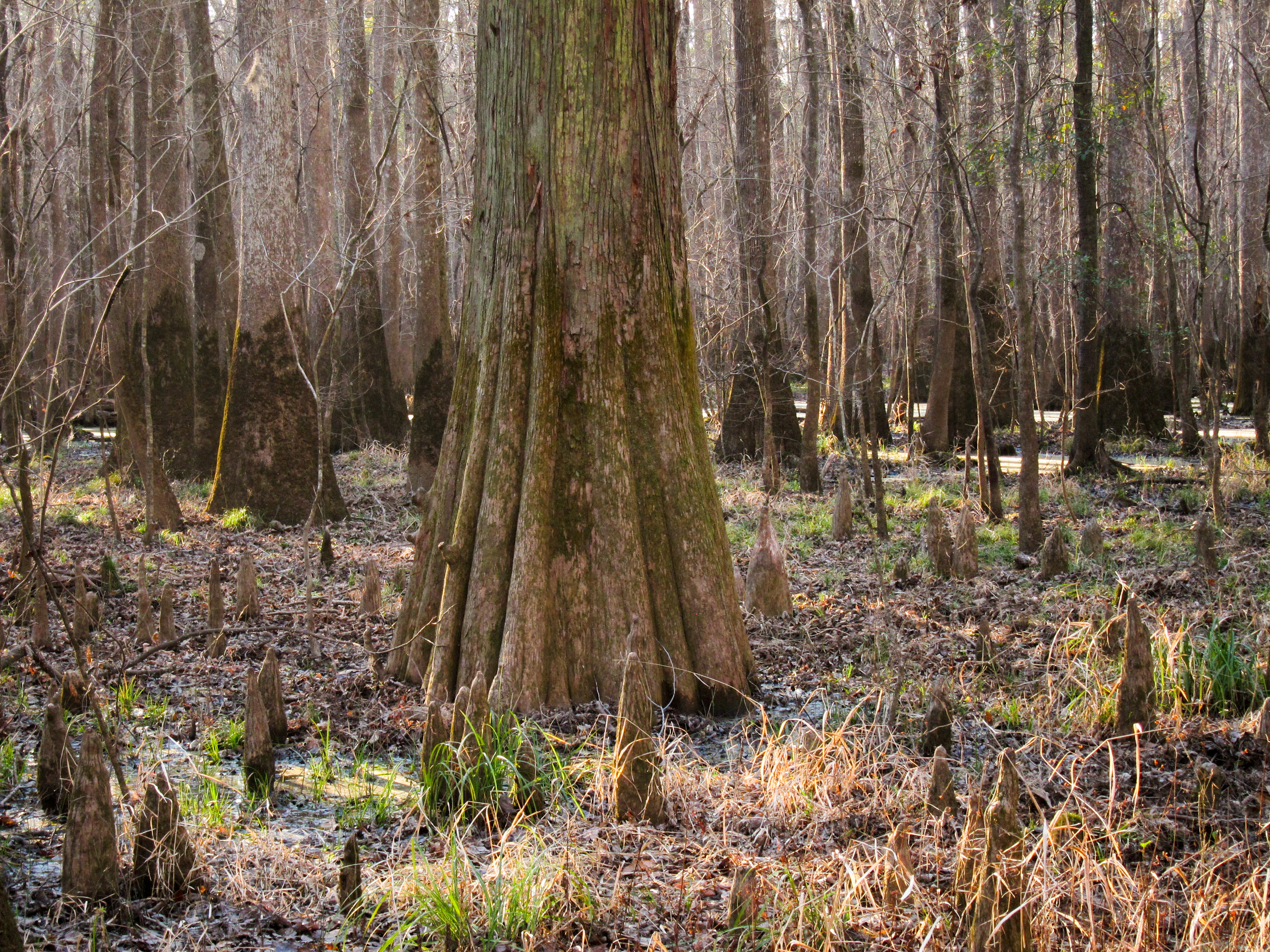
Old Growth Forest in Congaree National Park

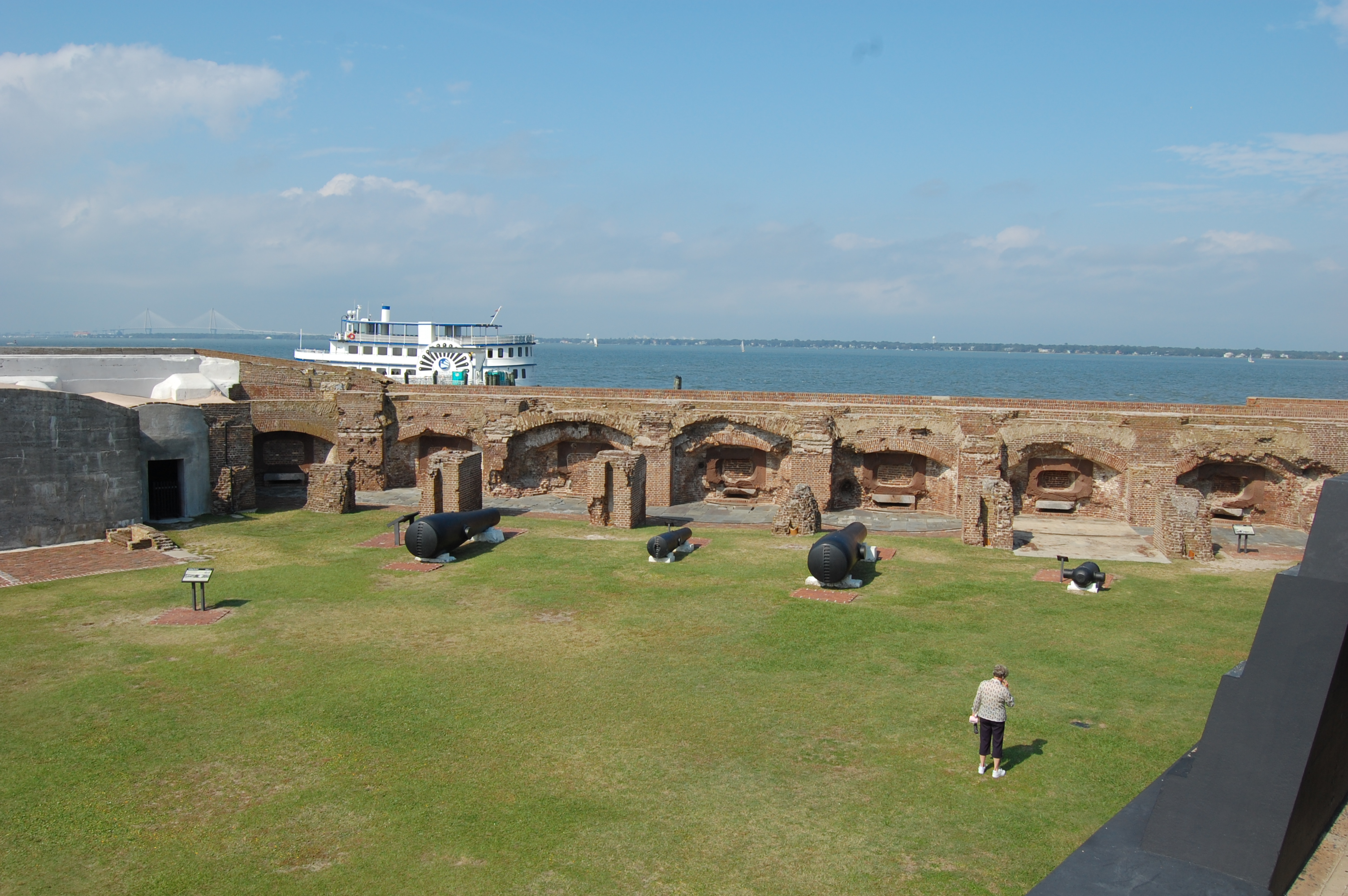
Overlooking Ft. Sumter National Monument

== See also ==
- List of South Carolina state forests
- List of South Carolina state parks
- List of South Carolina wildlife management areas
- State of South Carolina
