= Fields Point, South Carolina =

Coordinates: 32°34′08″N 80°33′25″W

Fields Point is a peninsula in Colleton County, South Carolina, that has been part of plantation lands and was fortified during the American Civil War. It includes an area of high ground along a bend in the Combahee River and is named for the Fields family that owned a plantation on the property. The area saw action during the American Civil War including during the raid on Combahee Ferry that involved Harriet Tubman. The area now includes a county owned boat landing. Surrounding land is owned by the Cheeha-Combahee Plantation.

The area was largely abandoned for a time.

The Dai-Ching reportedly grounded at Fields Point during the night after it was abandoned and set alight.
