= South Carolina Highway 303 =

State highway in South Carolina, United States

South Carolina Highway 303

Route information
- Maintained by SCDOT
- Length: 13.515 mi (21.750 km)
- Existed: 1930–present

Major junctions
- South end: US 17 near Green Pond
- North end: US 17 Alt. / SC 63 in Walterboro

Location
- Country: United States
- State: South Carolina
- Counties: Colleton

Highway system
- South Carolina State Highway System; Interstate; US; State; Scenic
← SC 302	→ SC 304

South Carolina Highway 303 (SC 303) is a 13.515-mile-long (21.750 km) state highway in the U.S. state of South Carolina. Known as the Green Pond Highway, it connects Green Pond and Walterboro.

== Route description ==
SC 303 begins at an intersection with U.S. Route 17 (US 17; ACE Basin Parkway) south-southeast of Green Pond, Colleton County, where the roadway continues as Donnelley Drive. This intersection in on the northwestern corner of the Donnelley Wildlife Management Area. It travels to the north-northwest and enters Green Pond, where it crosses railroad tracks. It then crosses Ashepoo River and travels through Ritter. Farther to the north-northwest, it enters Walterboro, where it meets its northern terminus, an intersection with US 17 Alternate/SC 63 (Jefferies Boulevard).

== Major intersections ==
The entire route is in Colleton County.

Location	mi	km	Destinations	Notes
	0.000	0.000	US 17 (ACE Basin Parkway) – Beaufort, Savannah, Jacksonboro, Charleston	
Walterboro	13.515	21.750	US 17 Alt. / SC 63 (Jefferies Boulevard) to I-95 / US 15 – Savannah, St. George	
1.000 mi = 1.609 km; 1.000 km = 0.621 mi
