= Robert Tarlton =

American politician

Robert Tarlton was an American farmer and state legislator in South Carolina. He represented Colleton County in the South Carolina House of Representatives from 1870 to 1874 during the Reconstruction era. He was born in South Carolina and documented as being "mulatto".

== See also ==
- African American officeholders from the end of the Civil War until before 1900
