= Gaylord Donnelley =

Gaylord Donnelley (1910 - 1992) was an owner and board member of R. R. Donnelley. He graduated from Yale University in 1931. He was married to Dorothy Ranney Donnelley (1910-2002).

== Conservation work ==
Actively interested in conservationism, Donnelley served as a member of the Illinois Nature Preservation Commission.

In South Carolina, he and Dorothy were founding members of the ACE Basin Task Force. The Donnelley Wildlife Management Area in Green Pond, SC is named in honor of the Donnelley family, which still maintains a home nearby.

== Legacy ==
The legacy of Gaylord and Dorothy continues through the work of the Gaylord and Dorothy Donnelley Foundation, which they founded in 1952. It is managed by their children and grandchildren, along with non-family board members, and a professional staff of ten. The Foundation's mission is to support land conservation, artistic vitality, and regional collections for the people of the Chicago region and the Lowcountry of South Carolina.
