= Eulogios the Persian =

Eulogios the Persian (Greek: Εὐλόγιος ὁ Πέρσης, fl. 867) was a 9th-century Byzantine figure, who played a role in the aftermath of the assassination of Michael III (r. 842–867) and the succession of Basil I (r. 867–886) to the throne.

Of Persian origin, Eulogios was reportedly well off and lived in a manor house in Constantinople. According to Anthony Kaldellis, he may have been a descendant of the Khurramites who entered Byzantine service in the 830s.

After the conspirators succeeded in killing Michael III on the night of 23/24 September 867, they went to Eulogios's house and took him to the Great Palace of Constantinople. There, Eulogios notified the commander of the palace guard (hetaireiarches) Artabasdos about Michael III's death, and advised him to open the gates of the palace to the new emperor, Basil I.

Alongside his kinsmen Artabasdos and Iakobitzes, Eulogios was one of several Persians who flourished in the Byzantine Empire in 867. Though they were all well integrated in Byzantine society, they "continued to cultivate ethnic links to each other, expressed through language".

== Sources ==
- Kaldellis, Anthony (2019). Romanland: Ethnicity and Empire in Byzantium. Harvard University Press. ISBN 978-0674986510.
