= St. Helena Sound Heritage Preserve =

Coordinates: 32°27′17″N 80°26′25″W

The St. Helena Sound Heritage Preserve is a collection of Sea Islands totaling 10,301 acres (41.69 km^{2}) of upland and wetland property located along the Saint Helena Sound in the Lowcountry region of South Carolina. Owned and managed by the South Carolina Department of Natural Resources (SCDNR), the preserve is also considered to be a designated Wildlife Management Area and a portion of the ACE Basin area. Listed below are properties that consist of the preserve:

- Otter Island (1,899 acres (7.68 km^{2}))
- Ashe Island (1,722 acres (6.97 km^{2}))
- Beet Island (1,685 acres (6.82 km^{2}))
- Big/Warren Islands ((2,241 acres (9.07 km^{2}))
- South Williman Island ((2,764 acres (11.19 km^{2}))

== See also ==
- ACE Basin
- ACE Basin NERR
- Saint Helena Sound
