= List of South Carolina wildlife management areas =

List of South Carolina wildlife management areas is divided into four Game Zones.

- Aiken Gopher Tortoise Heritage Preserve/Wildlife Management Area: 1,622 acres (656 ha) habitat for the Florida Gopher Tortoise.
- Angelus WMA: 52 acres (21 ha)
- Ashmore Heritage Preserve/Wildlife Management Area
- Bear Island Wildlife Management Area
- Belfast Wildlife Management Area: 4,664 acres (1,887 ha).
- Bland Tract Dove Field, Manchester State Forest (MSF) WMA
- Bonneau Ferry Wildlife Management Area: 10,700 acres (4,300 ha)
- Botany Bay Plantation Heritage Preserve/ Wildlife Management Area
- Brasstown Creek Heritage Preserve/Wildlife Management Area: 3,170 acres (1,280 ha).
- Buzzard Roost Heritage Preserve/Wildlife Management Area
- Caesars Head/Jones Gap
- Campbells Crossroads WMA
- Canal WMA
- Cartwheel Bay Heritage Preserve/Wildlife Management Area
- Causey Tract, Gravely WMA, Clemson University
- Chestnut Ridge Heritage Preserve/Wildlife Management Area
- Cliff Pitts WMA
- Clinton Reservoir Tract
- Crackerneck Wildlife Management Area and Ecological Reserve: 10,600 acres (4,300 ha) of land owned by the United States Department of Energy but managed by the South Carolina Department of Natural Resources (SCDNR).
- Ditch Pond Heritage Preserve/Wildlife Management Area
- Donnelley Wildlife Management Area
- Draper Wildlife Management Area
- Dungannon Plantation Heritage Preserve/Wildlife Management Area
- Eastatoe Creek Heritage Preserve/Wildlife Management Area
- Edisto River Wildlife Management Area
- Eva Russell Chandler Heritage Preserve/Wildlife Management Area
- Fant's Grove WMA: 8,540 acres (3,460 ha) owned by Clemson University (96%) and a private land owner. The university also owns the 4,100 acres (1,700 ha) Keowee WMA. Fants Grove is located on the southern end of Lake Hartwell and Keowee on the north end.
- Forty Acre Rock Heritage Preserve/Wildlife Management Area
- Francis Marion National Forest
- Gray Court Tract Wildlife Management Area
- Great Pee Dee River Heritage Preserve/Wildlife Management Area
- Hamilton Ridge WMA
- Hatchery WMA
- Henderson Heritage Preserve/Wildlife Management Area
- Herbert Kirsh Wildlife Conservation Area
- Hickory Top WMA
- James L. Mason WMA
- James Ross Wildlife Reservation
- Jocassee Gorges
- Keowee WMA: 4,100 acres (1,700 ha). See Fant's Grove WMA above.
- Landsford Canal Forest Legacy Area
- Laurel Fork Heritage Preserve/Wildlife Management Area
- Lewis Ocean Bay Heritage Preserve/Wildlife Management Area
- Liberty Hill WMA
- Little Pee Dee Heritage Preserve/Wildlife Management Area
- London Creek Wildlife Management Area
- Longleaf Pine Heritage Preserve/Wildlife Management Area
- Lynchburg Savanna Heritage Preserve/Wildlife Management Area
- Manchester State Forest
- Marsh Wildlife Management Area
- McBee WMA
- McCalla WMA
- McConnells Tract
- Moultrie Hunt Unit WMA
- Nine Times Preserve
- Oak Lea Wildlife Management Area
- Old Island Heritage Preserve/Wildlife Management Area
- Palachucola Wildlife Management Area
- Pee Dee Station Site WMA
- Rock Hill Blackjacks Heritage Preserve/Wildlife Management Area
- Samworth Wildlife Management Area
- Sandhills State Forest WMA
- Santee Coastal Reserve Wildlife Management Area
- Santee Cooper Tract WMA
- Santee Cooper Wildlife Management Area
- Santee Dam WMA
- Santee-Delta Wildlife Management Area
- South Fenwick Island
- St. Helena Sound Heritage Preserve/Wildlife Management Area
- Stevens Creek Heritage Preserve/Wildlife Management Area
- Stumphouse Mountain Heritage Preserve/Wildlife Management Area
- Sumter National Forest - Andrew Pickens Ranger District
- Sumter National Forest - Enoree Ranger District
- Sumter National Forest - Long Cane Ranger District
- Tall Pines WMA
- Thurmond Tract Wildlife Management Area
- Tillman Sand Ridge Heritage Preserve/Wildlife Management Area
- Tuomey Tract Dove Field, Manchester State Forest (MSF) WMA
- Turtle Island WMA
- Victoria Bluff Heritage Preserve/Wildlife Management Area
- Waccamaw River Heritage Preserve/Wildlife Management Area
- Wadakoe Mountain Heritage Preserve/Wildlife Management Area
- Wateree Heritage Preserve /Wildlife Management Area
- Watson-Cooper Heritage Preserve/Wildlife Management Area
- Webb Wildlife Center
- Wee Tee WMA
- Wild Turkey Management Demonstration Area
- Woodbury WMA
- Worth Mountain WMA
