= Ashepoo Combahee Edisto Basin National Estuarine Research Reserve =

Taman Muara Simpanan Penyelidikan Ashepoo Combahee Edisto Basin

Coordinates: 32°29′N 80°26′W

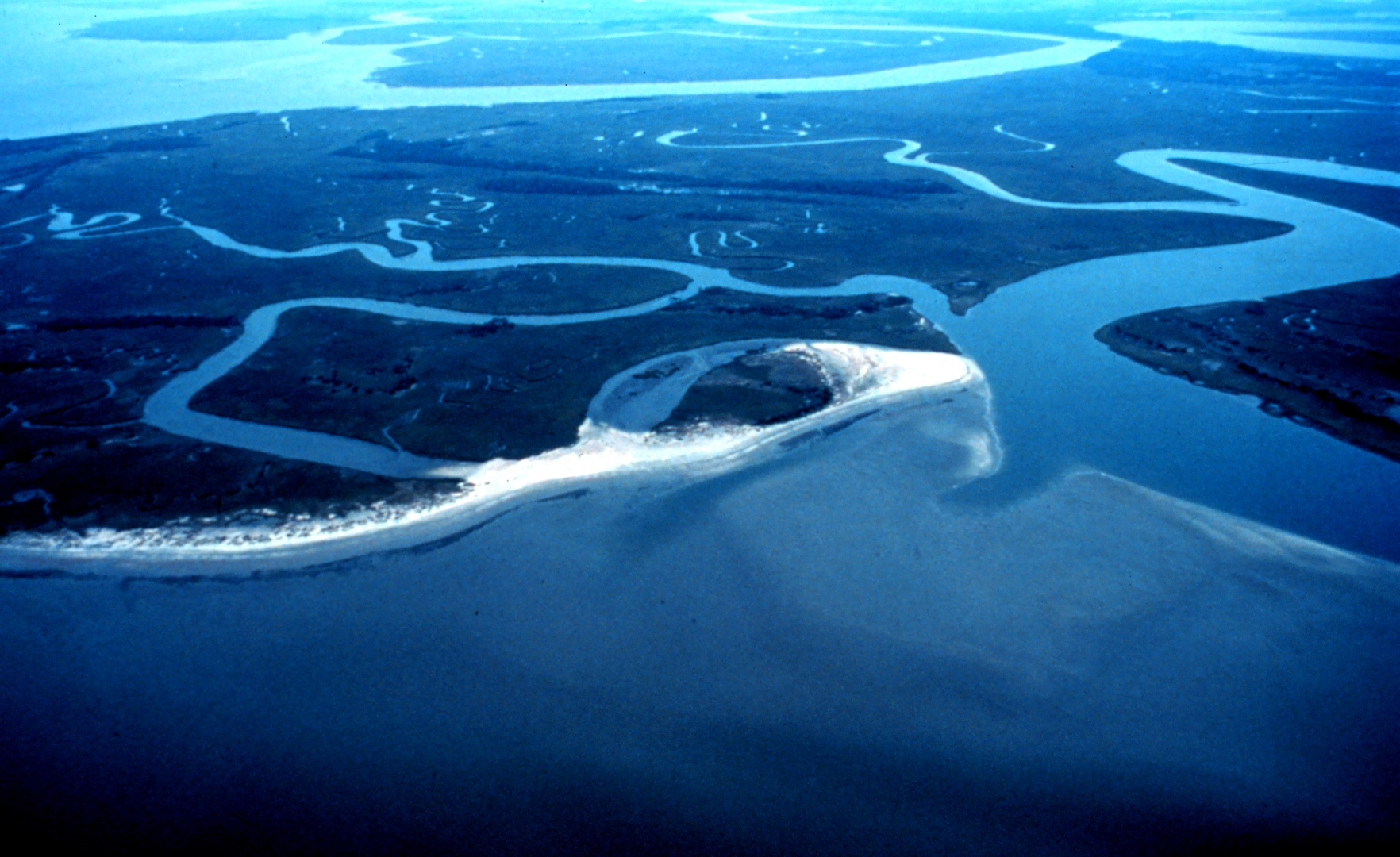
Otter Island from the air, ACE Basin National Estuarine Research Reserve, October 2010.

The Ashepoo Combahee Edisto Basin National Estuarine Research Reserve (often shortened to ACE Basin NERR) is a 140,000-acre (570 km^{2}) reserve area located in the ACE Basin, one of the largest undeveloped estuaries on the Atlantic coast of the United States. It is named for the Ashepoo, Combahee and Edisto Rivers, which flow past cypress swamps, historic plantation houses, old rice fields and tidal marshes to meet at South Carolina's biologically rich St. Helena Sound.

The ACE Basin NERR is intended to protect the natural environment, wildlife and cultural heritage of the area. The reserve also preserves the habitat of a number of endangered or threatened species, such as shortnose sturgeon, wood storks, loggerhead sea turtles and bald eagles.

Commercial fisherman harvest supplies of shrimp, crab, oyster, clam and finfish each year in the ACE Basin. Recreational fishermen ply the mudflats for spottail bass, flounder and shrimp, while paddlers visit the salt marsh creeks and the black waters of the rivers.

Research conducted at the ACE Basin NERR enhance the protection of these commercial and recreational uses by monitoring water quality, providing information on the number and types of plant and animal species, and evaluating the overall health of the ACE Basin ecosystem.

Through a number of educational programs, the reserve provides information to coastal decision makers, lawmakers, teachers, students and the general public. The reserve sponsors a summer lecture series, develops curriculum materials for teachers, offers a touch tank program for children and conducts educational cruises where students and teachers learn about estuaries and their values to marine, avian and human life.
