= ACE Basin National Wildlife Refuge =

United States National Wildlife Refuge in South Carolina

Ernest F. Hollings ACE Basin National Wildlife Refuge
- IUCN category IV (habitat/species management area)
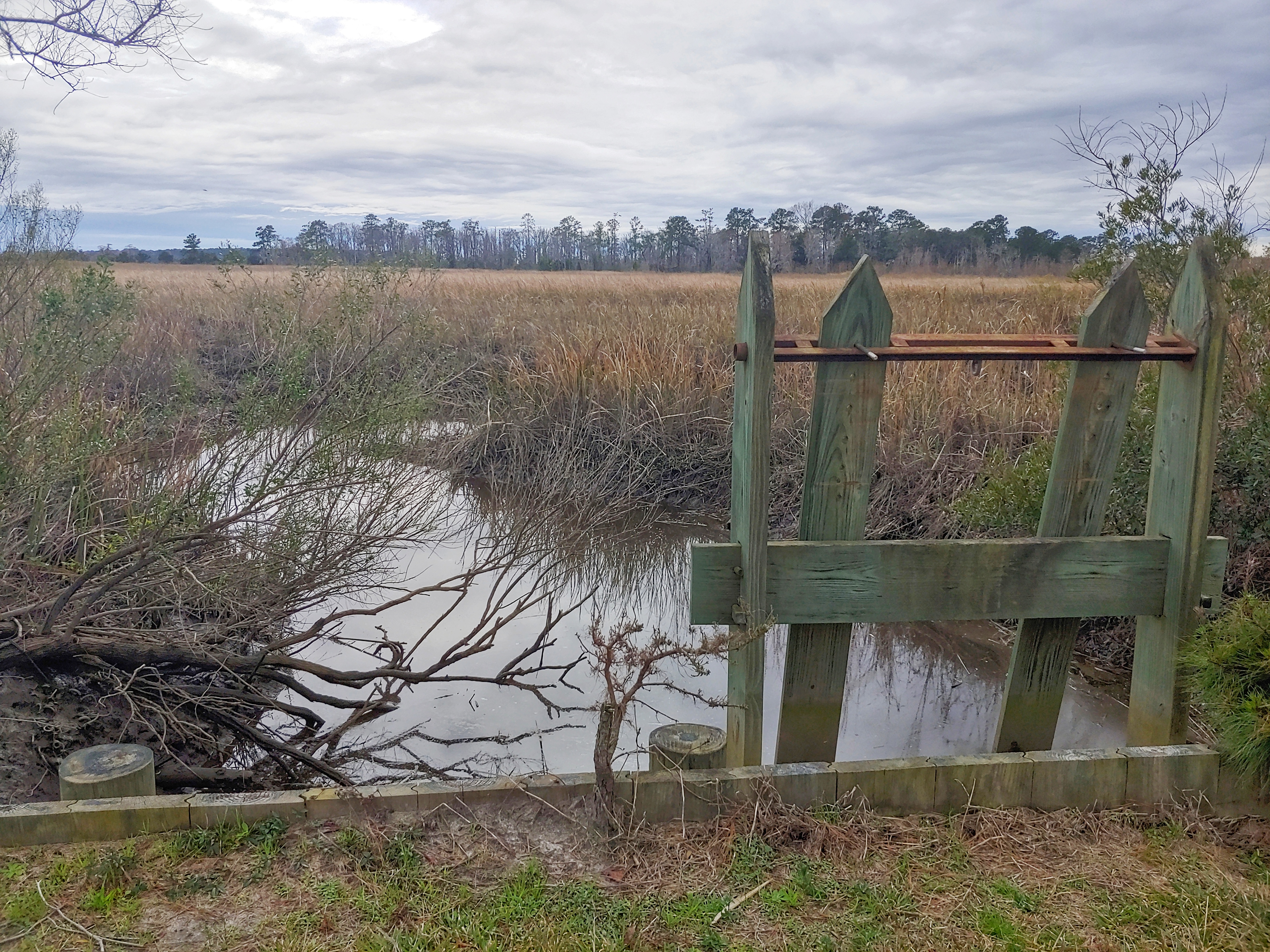
- Rice trunk at ACE Basin NWR

- Location within the United States Location within South Carolina
- Location: Beaufort, Charleston, Colleton, Hampton counties, South Carolina, United States
- Nearest city: Beaufort, South Carolina
- Coordinates: 32°30′30″N 80°28′00″W
- Area: 11,815 acres (47.81 km^{2})
- Established: 1990
- Governing body: U.S. Fish and Wildlife Service
- Website: Ernest F. Hollings ACE Basin National Wildlife Refuge

The Ernest F. Hollings ACE Basin National Wildlife Refuge is a 11,815-acre (47.81 km^{2}) portion of the larger ACE Basin area, and the only portions that are federally protected. The wildlife refuge is divided into two units: the Edisto River unit and the Combahee River unit.

The following threatened or endangered species are present in the refuge: wood stork
