= Caeser P. Chisolm =

American South Carolina state legislator

Caeser P. Chisolm was a South Carolina state legislator. He represented Colleton County, South Carolina in the South Carolina House of Representatives.

He provided testimony as a witness to injuries causing disability to U.S. Colored Troops veteran James Perkins.

Chisolm received a charter to operate ferry service across the Ashepoo River.

He served in the 55th General Assembly in 1882 and 1883. Two of his children, Tom and Silvia, gave accounts to the Slave Narrative Project.

== See also ==
- African American officeholders from the end of the Civil War until before 1900
