= Colleton State Park =

State park in South Carolina, United States

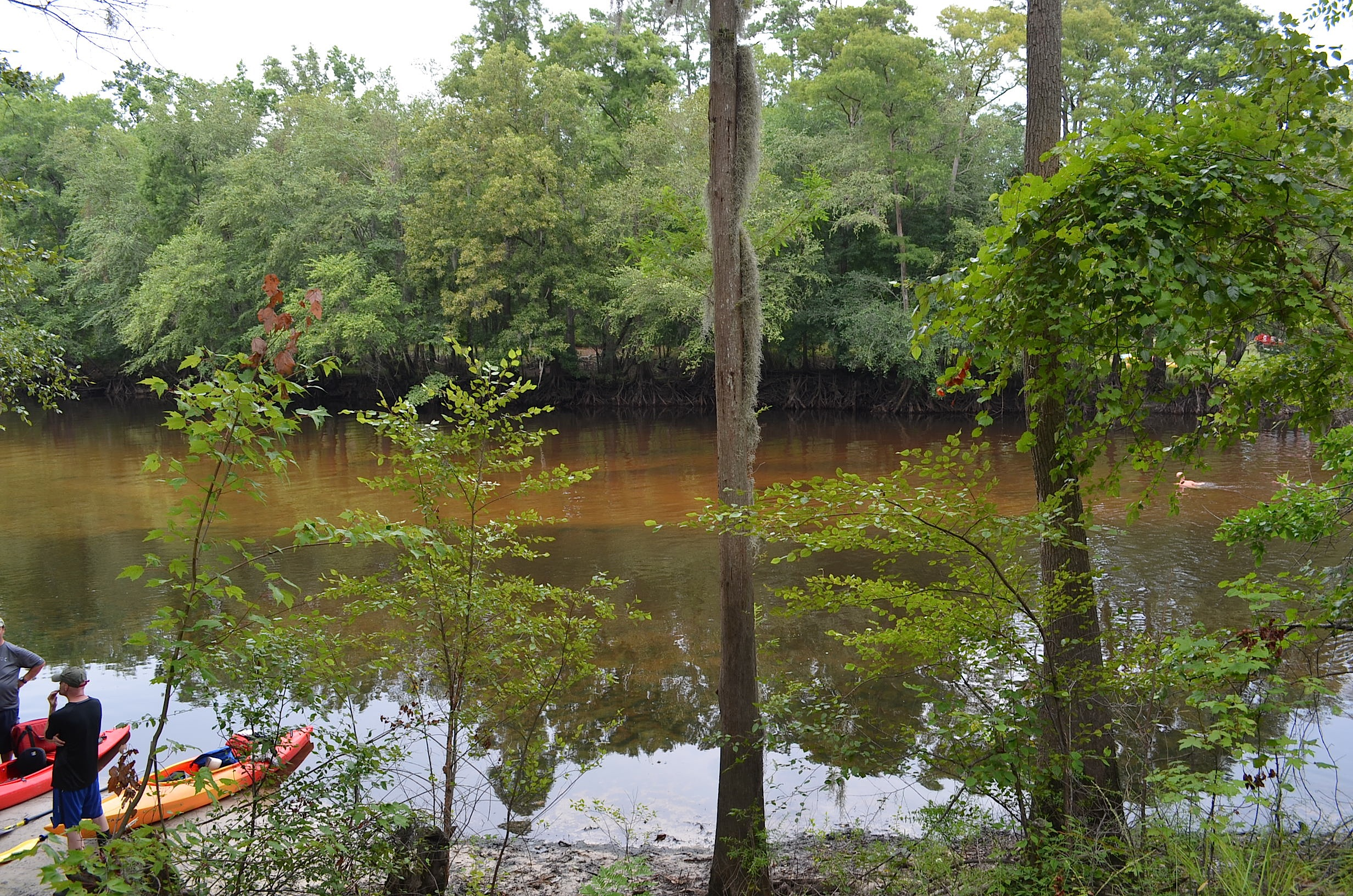
- Edisto River at Colleton State Park, July 2014
- Interactive map of Colleton State Park
- Type: state park
- Location: Colleton County, South Carolina (Lowcountry region)
- Nearest city: St. George; Walterboro
- Coordinates: 33°03′45″N 80°36′57″W
- Area: 35 acres (0.14 km^{2})
- Elevation: 78 feet (23.8 m)
- Created: 1944
- Operator: South Carolina Department of Parks, Recreation & Tourism
- Camp sites: limited
- Hiking trails: Cypress Swamp trail (0.3 mi)
- Other information: Free admission Hours: 9 a.m. to sunset Pets: allowed, must be leashed
- Website: http://southcarolinaparks.com/colleton/introduction.aspx

Colleton State Park is a 35-acre (0.14 km^{2}) state park located along U.S. Highway 15 between St. George and Walterboro, South Carolina, United States. The smallest state park in the state of South Carolina, Colleton's main attraction is recreational access to the Edisto River in the form of paddling or fishing. Several campsites for RVs and tents as well as some team-sport recreation facilities are also located on the site. For many years, the park was underutilized due in part to an adjacent SCE&G coal-fired power plant, which discouraged many potential visitors from the park. The power plant was closed by SCE&G at the end of 2012. Local officials hope to potentially acquire the site and expand the park.
