= South Carolina Highway 63 =

State highway in South Carolina, United States

South Carolina Highway 63

Route information
- Maintained by SCDOT
- Length: 28.200 mi (45.384 km)
- Existed: 1925–present

Major junctions
- West end: US 278 in Varnville
- US 21 near Islandton; I-95 in Walterboro; US 17 Alt. in Walterboro
- East end: SC 64 Bus. in Walterboro

Location
- Country: United States
- State: South Carolina
- Counties: Hampton, Colleton

Highway system
- South Carolina State Highway System; Interstate; US; State; Scenic
← SC 61	→ SC 64

South Carolina Highway 63 (SC 63) is a 28.200-mile-long (45.384 km) state highway in the U.S. state of South Carolina. The highway is designated on a north–south direction, though it is signed as and located physically on an east–west orientation, from U.S. Route 278 (US 278) in Varnville to SC 64 Business (SC 64 Bus.) in Walterboro.

== Major intersections ==
County	Location	mi	km	Destinations	Notes
Hampton	Varnville	0.000	0.000	US 278 (Carolina Avenue) / Hickory Hill Road – Hampton, Yemassee	Western terminus
Hampton		3.080	4.957	SC 363 west (Charleston Highway) – Hampton	Eastern terminus of SC 363
Colleton		15.420	24.816	US 21 (Lowcountry Highway) – Yemassee, Branchville	
Colleton	Walterboro	23.720– 23.727	38.174– 38.185	I-95 – Savannah, Florence	I-95 exit 53
Colleton	Walterboro	25.360	40.813	US 17 Alt. south (Hendersonville Highway) – Yemassee	Southern end of US 17 Alt. concurrency
Colleton	Walterboro	26.780	43.098	SC 303 south (Green Pond Highway) – Green Pond	Northern terminus of SC 303
Colleton	Walterboro	27.100	43.613	US 17 Alt. north (South Jefferies Boulevard) – St. George	Northern end of US 17 Alt. concurrency
Colleton	Walterboro	28.200	45.384	SC 64 Bus. (Padgett Loop / Hampton Street) – Jacksonboro, Charleston, Barnwell	Eastern terminus
1.000 mi = 1.609 km; 1.000 km = 0.621 mi: Concurrency terminus

== Islandton alternate route ==
South Carolina Highway 63 Alternate
- Location: Islandton
- Existed: 1938–1947

South Carolina Highway 63 Alternate (SC 63 Alt.) was an alternate route that existed east-southeast of Islandton. It was established in February 1938 as a partial renumbering of SC 63. It was decommissioned in 1947 and downgraded to secondary roads. Its west–east portion is known today as Varnadoe Road. Its south–north portion is known as Adnah Church Road.
