= Saint Helena Sound =

Coastal inlet in South Carolina

Coordinates: 32°27′17″N 80°26′25″W

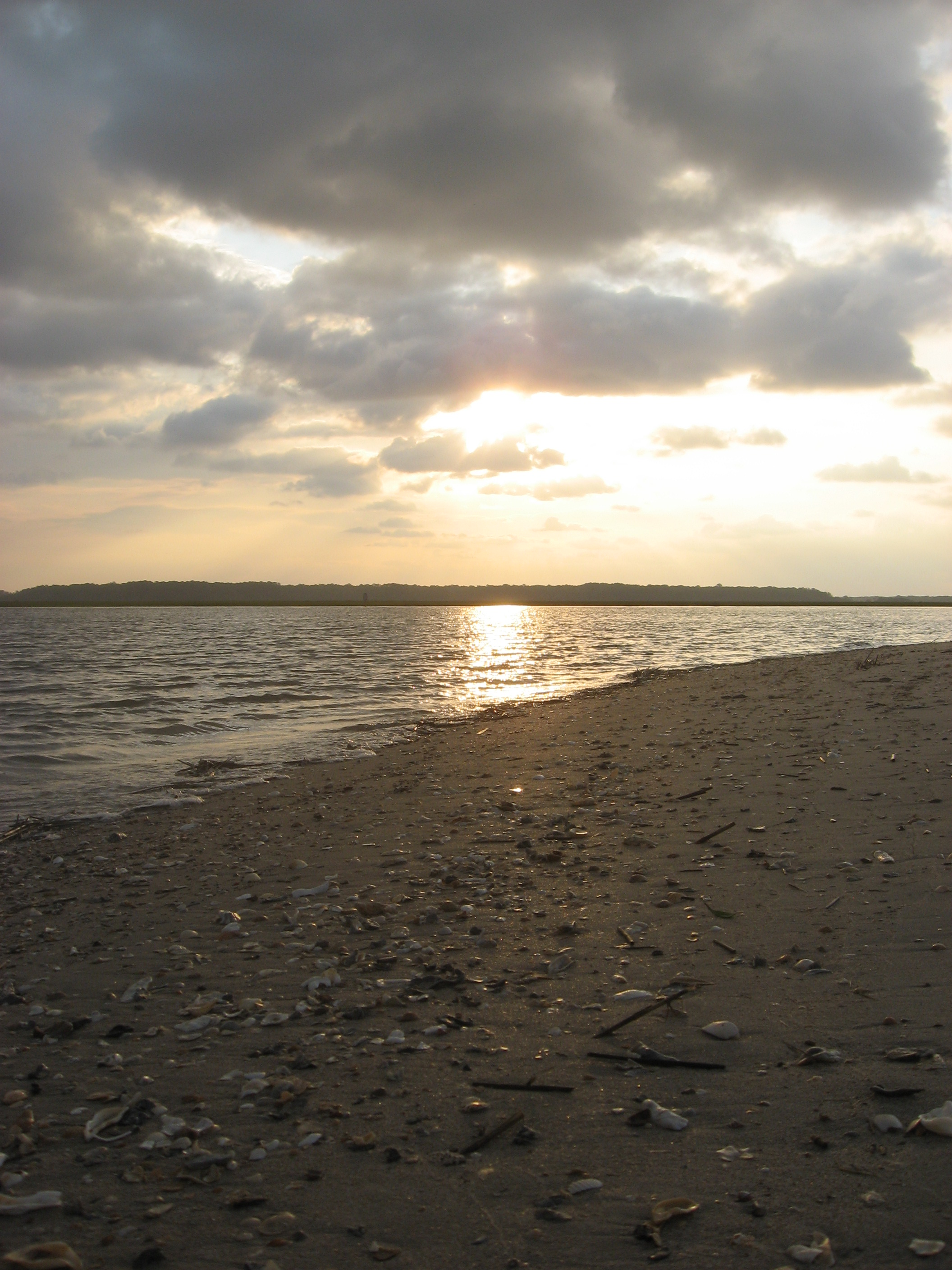
Sunrise at St. Helena Sound, June 2007

Saint Helena Sound is a coastal inlet in the Lowcountry region of South Carolina, located along the Atlantic Ocean between Beaufort and Colleton counties. Located within the relatively undeveloped ACE Basin, the sound consists of the mouths of the Ashepoo, Combahee, and the south branch of the Edisto rivers, of which the ACE moniker derives from. The inlet is located 15-mile (24 km)east of Beaufort, between Edisto Island and Hunting Island. At its widest point, Saint Helena Sound is 7.5-mile (12.1 km) across. The Intracoastal Waterway crosses the sound. Much of the land surrounding St. Helena Sound has been preserved through the St. Helena Sound Heritage Preserve and the larger ACE Basin project.

== See also ==
- ACE Basin
- St. Helena Sound Heritage Preserve
- Waterways forming and crossings of the Atlantic Intracoastal Waterway
- List of rivers of South Carolina
- List of rivers of the Americas by coastline
