= Anthony Kaldellis =

American historian

- Αντώνιος Καλδέλλης
- Born: 29 November 1971 (age 54); Athens, Greece

Academic background
- Education: University of Michigan (BA, BA, PhD)

Academic work
- Discipline: Byzantine studies
- Institutions: University of Chicago
- Website: https://kaldellispublications.weebly.com/

Anthony Kaldellis (Greek: Αντώνιος Καλδέλλης Antonios Kaldellis; born 29 November 1971) is a Greek and American historian and Byzantinist who is Gaylord Donnelley Distinguished Service Professor in the Department of Classics and the College at the University of Chicago. He is a specialist in Greek historiography, Plato, and Byzantine studies.

== Biography ==
Anthony Kaldellis was born on 29 November 1971 in Athens, Greece. He received two bachelor's degrees in history and philosophy in 1994 from the University of Michigan and then a Ph.D. in 2001 in history from the university. After gaining his Ph.D., Kaldellis has served as assistant professor (2001–2006), associate professor (2006–2007), full-time professor (2007–2022) and chair (2015–2022) of the department of classics at Ohio State University. In 2022, he joined the department of classics at the University of Chicago.

Kaldellis is a member of the advisory boards of the Journal of Late Antiquity (2016–), Minerva (2013), and Greek, Roman, and Byzantine Studies (2008–); a member of the editorial boards of the Byzantine Greek series of the Dumbarton Oaks Medieval Library (2008–) and Estudios Bizantinos: Digital Journal of the Spanish Society of Byzantine Studies (2012–); and Associate Editor of Bryn Mawr Classical Review (2017–), of which he was Editor from 2010 to 2017. He has previously been Series Editor of Routledge Classical Translations (2011–2015), member of the editorial board of Medieval Confluences: Studies in the Intellectual History and Comparative History of Ideas of the Medieval World (2009–2019), and Review Editor of Speculum: A Journal of Medieval Studies (2006–2012).

As the author of monographs on classical antiquity and the Byzantine Empire, Kaldellis has called into question a commonly accepted view of Byzantium as an absolutist world; he considers instead the Byzantine Empire a "bottom-up monarchy", where the common people have a good share in government, since emperors impose laws by acknowledging their customs and demands.

== Selected works ==
- The Argument of Psellos’ Chronographia, 1999
- Procopius of Caesarea: Tyranny, History, and Philosophy at the End of Antiquity, 2004
- Hellenism in Byzantium: The Transformations of Greek Identity and the Reception of the Classical Tradition, 2007
- The Christian Parthenon: Classicism and Pilgrimage in Byzantine Athens, 2010
- Ethnography after Antiquity: Foreign Lands and People in Byzantine Literature, 2014
- A New Herodotos: Laonikos Chalkokondyles on the Ottoman Empire, the Fall of Byzantium, and the Emergence of the West, 2014
- The Byzantine Republic: People and Power in New Rome, 2015
- Streams of Gold, Rivers of Blood: The Rise and Fall of Byzantium, 955 A.D. to the First Crusade, 2017
- A Cabinet of Byzantine Curiosities: Strange Tales and Surprising Facts from History's Most Orthodox Empire, 2017
- Romanland: Ethnicity and Empire in Byzantium, 2019
- Byzantium Unbound, 2019
- The New Roman Empire: A History of Byzantium, 2023
- 1453: The Conquest and Tragedy of Constantinople, 2026

== Podcasts ==
- Byzantium & Friends
- An interview with Professor Anthony Kaldellis about his book The Byzantine Republic, from The History of Byzantium Podcast

== Videos ==
- Interview with Dr. Anthony Kaldellis, The Institute for the Study of Western Civilization, Texas Tech University
- Anthony Kaldellis on the Crisis of Hellenism, Society for the Preservation of Greek Heritage
- The Byzantines and the Classical Past (with Anthony Kaldellis)

== Sources ==
- "Anthony Kaldellis". Ohio State University. Archived from the original on 22 May 2022.
- "Anthony Kaldellis" (PDF). Ohio State University.
