= Ruffin, South Carolina =

- Unincorporated community
- Location within South Carolina Location within the United States
- Coordinates: 33°00′17″N 80°48′56″W
- Country: United States
- State: South Carolina
- County: Colleton
- Elevation: 72 ft (22 m)
- Time zone: UTC-5 (Eastern (EST))
  - Summer (DST): UTC-4 (EDT)
- ZIP code: 29475
- Area codes: 843, 854
- GNIS feature ID: 1231754

Ruffin is an unincorporated community in Colleton County, South Carolina, United States. The community is located on U.S. Route 21, 11 miles (18 km) northwest of Walterboro. Ruffin has a post office with ZIP code 29475, which opened on October 19, 1893.
