= 2nd South Carolina Colored Infantry Regiment =

- South Carolina state flag
- Active: May 22, 1863, to February 8, 1864
- Country: United States
- Allegiance: United States of America; Union
- Branch: Infantry
- Equipment: Rifled muskets
- Engagements: American Civil War: Raid at Combahee Ferry; Burning of Darien, Georgia

The 2nd South Carolina Colored Infantry Regiment was an African-American infantry regiment that served in the Union Army during the American Civil War. It was among the scores of units raised starting in the middle of the war to augment Federal troop strength by tapping into the large Southern population of former slaves. Harriet Tubman lead the regiment in the Raid at Combahee Ferry in which roughly 800 slaves were freed. It gained notoriety among certain quarters for its actions during the controversial looting and burning of the pro-Confederate town of Darien, Georgia. This operation was part of the Union strategy to damage the Confederate states' ability to supply food and materials towards their war effort.

The regiment and its role in burning Darien are featured in the 1989 Civil War film Glory.

== Commanders ==
Colonel James Montgomery

Lieut. Colonel W.W. Marple

== Service ==
In January 1863, Col. James Montgomery of Kansas was authorized to raise a regiment of troops consisting entirely of free blacks and refugee former slaves, which were to serve under white officers. While many men readily agreed to military service, Confederate sources allege that some were forcibly conscripted.

Montgomery organized the 2nd South Carolina Volunteer Infantry at Beaufort and Hilton Head, South Carolina. The new recruits were mustered into Federal service on May 22, 1863. The 2nd was attached initially to the Districts of Hilton Head and Beaufort, S.C., Tenth Army Corps, Department of the South.

Throughout 1863 and part of 1864, Montgomery practiced his Jayhawker brand of irregular warfare in South Carolina, Georgia, and Florida. In June 1863, Montgomery's brigade, including the 2nd South Carolina and the 54th Massachusetts Infantry under Col. Robert Gould Shaw, participated in operations along the Atlantic Coast resembling his earlier Jayhawking raids in Kansas and Missouri. The 2nd South Carolina was a part of the Raid at Combahee Ferry in which 800 slaves were freed. The regiment later helped loot and burn the coastal town of Darien, Georgia, despite the fact that it was undefended and offered no resistance.

In July 1863, the 2nd and the rest of Montgomery's brigade moved to Morris Island off the South Carolina coast. They took part in the expedition to James Island from July 7–17, and skirmished with Confederates at Grimball's Landing on July 16. The 2nd participated in the siege operations on Morris Island against Forts Wagner and Gregg from July 18 until September 7, when the Confederate defenders abandoned the two forts and withdrew.

The 2nd South Carolina was involved in the subsequent operations against Fort Sumter and the defenses of Charleston until January 29, 1864. It moved to Hilton Head, and then to Jacksonville, Florida, on February 5–7.

While in Florida, the regiment was disbanded and subsequently reorganized as the 34th United States Colored Infantry Regiment on February 8, 1864. Many of the men from the old 2nd South Carolina later participated in the Battle of Honey Hill. They were mustered out of the army on February 28, 1866.

== See also ==
- List of Union South Carolina Civil War Units
- South Carolina in the American Civil War
