= Bear Island (South Carolina) =

Island in Colleton County, South Carolina, United States

Coordinates: 32°36′43″N 80°26′42″W

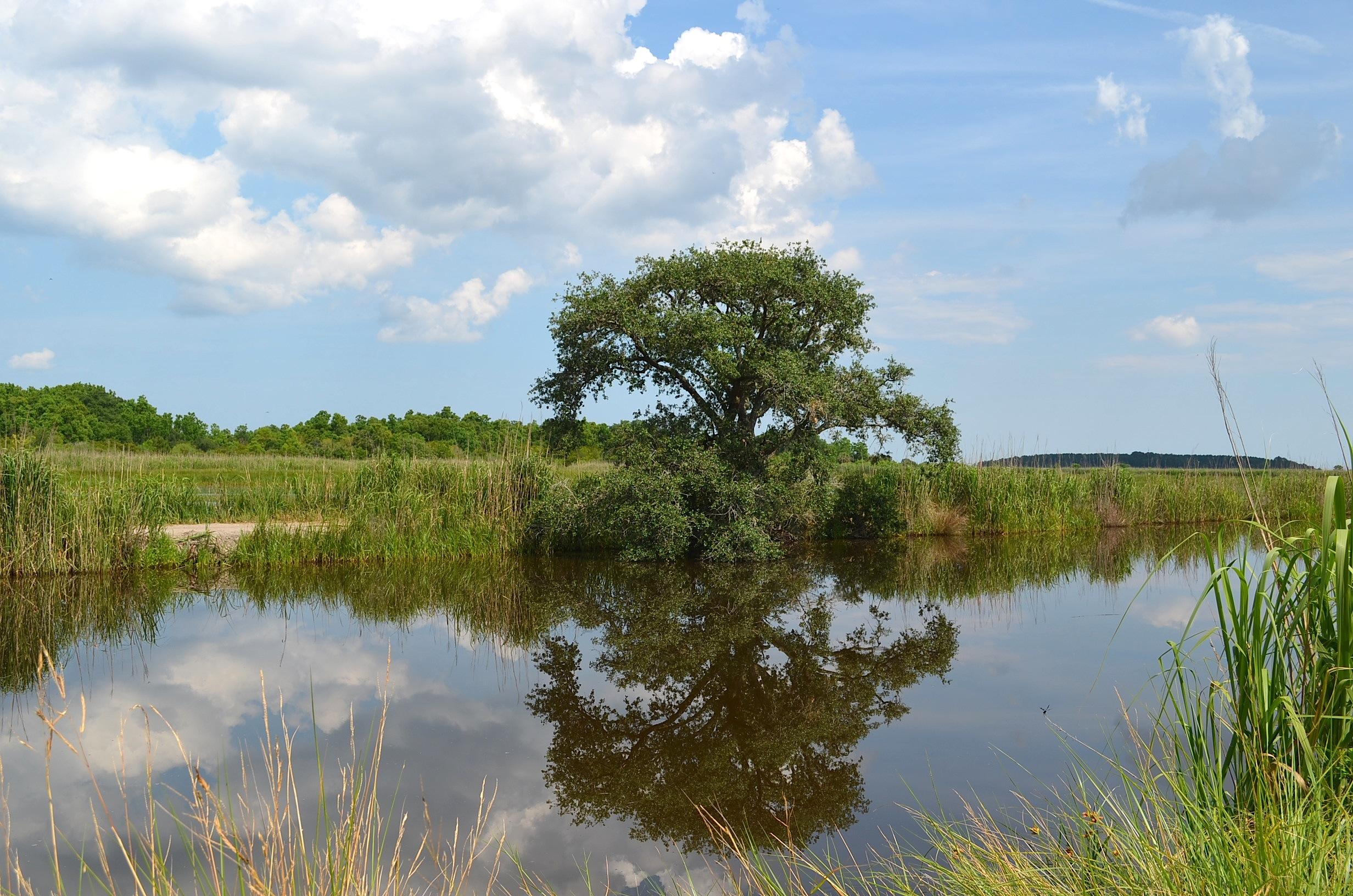
Bear Island Wildlife Management Area

Bear Island is an undeveloped 12,021-acre (48.65 km^{2}) Sea Island and wildlife management area in Colleton County, South Carolina, United States. It is part of the ACE Basin estuarine reserve area and is managed by the South Carolina Department of Natural Resources (SCDNR). The area is open to the public from early February to late October and is a popular spot for hiking, biking, birding, fishing, and hunting. A wide variety of waterfowl species inhabit the area. The area shuts down periodically for special hunts.

== See also ==
- ACE Basin
- ACE Basin NERR
- Sea Islands
