= Pinckney Island National Wildlife Refuge =

United States National Wildlife Refuge in South Carolina

- IUCN category IV (habitat/species management area)
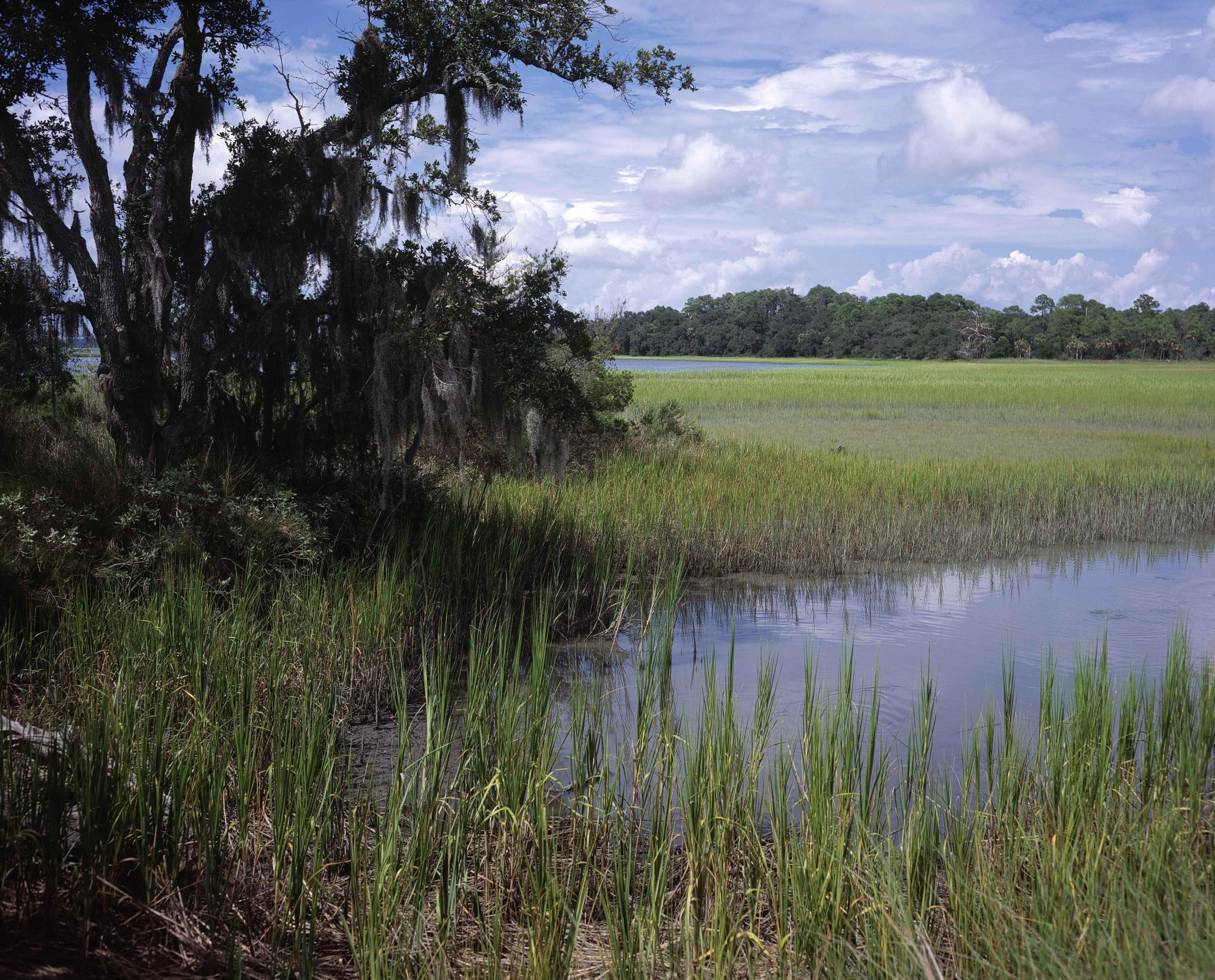
- Pinckney Island National Wildlife Refuge

- Location within South Carolina
- Location: Beaufort County, South Carolina, United States
- Nearest city: Hilton Head Island, South Carolina
- Coordinates: 32°14′38″N 80°45′55″W
- Area: 4,053 acres (16.40 km^{2})
- Established: 1975
- Visitors: 400,000 (in 2004)
- Governing body: U.S. Fish and Wildlife Service
- Website: Pinckney Island National Wildlife Refuge

The Pinckney Island National Wildlife Refuge is a 4,053-acre (16 km^{2}) National Wildlife Refuge located in Beaufort County, South Carolina between the mainland and Hilton Head Island. Named after Major General Charles Cotesworth Pinckney, it was established to provide a nature and forest preserve for aesthetic and conservation purposes.

The refuge is one of seven refuges administered by the Savannah Coastal Refuges Complex in Savannah, Georgia. The complex has a combined staff of 31 with a fiscal year 2005 budget of $3,582,000.

== History ==
Pinckney Island NWR is archaeologically rich, with 115 prehistoric and historic sites identified. Analysis of the prehistoric sites indicate human occupation dating from the Archaic Period (8000–1000 BC), with intensive use during the Mississippian Period (1000–1500 AD).

Historic artifacts indicate that small scale, impermanent settlements were made on Pinckney by French and Spanish groups in the 16th and 17th centuries. Permanent settlements did not occur until 1708 when Alexander Mackay, an Indian trader, obtained title to 200 acres (0.81 km^{2}) of present-day Pinckney Island. By 1715, Mackay had acquired the rest of the island, as well as most of the other islands which comprise the present refuge. In 1736, Mackay's widow sold the islands to Charles Pinckney, father of General Charles Cotesworth Pinckney.

General Pinckney was a commander during the Revolutionary War, a signer of the United States Constitution, and, in 1804 and 1808, a presidential candidate for the Federalist Party. After he inherited the islands from his father, Pinckney was an absentee landowner until 1804, when he moved to the island and began managing the property. The Pinckney family developed the islands into a plantation, removing much of the maritime forest and draining and tilling the fertile soil. By 1818, the Pinkneys owned over 200 enslaved people who produced long-staple Sea Island Cotton on 297 acres (1.20 km^{2}); by 1840, that number had increased to 300.

The plantation flourished until the American Civil War, when it was occupied by Union troops and the enslaved people were liberated. Small skirmishes took place on Pinckney Island. The most significant incident occurred on August 21, 1862, when the Confederate Beaufort Light Artillery/11th Infantry attacked the camp of Company H, Third Regiment, New Hampshire Volunteers, killing four Union soldiers and wounding ten men (eight Confederate, two Union).

US Army records reflect that black troops were recruited for the Union Army from the area. Five military (U.S. Colored Troops) headstones are located in a cemetery on the northwest side of Pinckney Island. It is possible that the U.S. Army had recruited slaves from those owned by the Pinckneys.

After the war and late century agricultural recession, the plantation did not prosper. By the 1930s, it was virtually abandoned. In 1937, after more than 200 years of Pinckney family ownership, the plantation was sold to Ellen Bruce, wife of James Bruce, a New York banker who used the property as a hunting preserve. The Bruces planted hardwoods and pine, built ponds to attract waterfowl and provide for irrigation, and placed 70 percent of the farm fields back into cultivation.

In 1954 Edward Starr and James Madison Barker, a distinguished MIT alumnus and early leader in the field of international business, purchased the islands. They continued to manage them as a game preserve. In 1975, they donated the islands to the United States Fish and Wildlife Service to be managed exclusively as a National Wildlife Refuge (NWR) and as a nature and forest preserve for aesthetic and conservation purposes. The Pinckney Island NWR was established on December 4, 1975.

== Topography ==
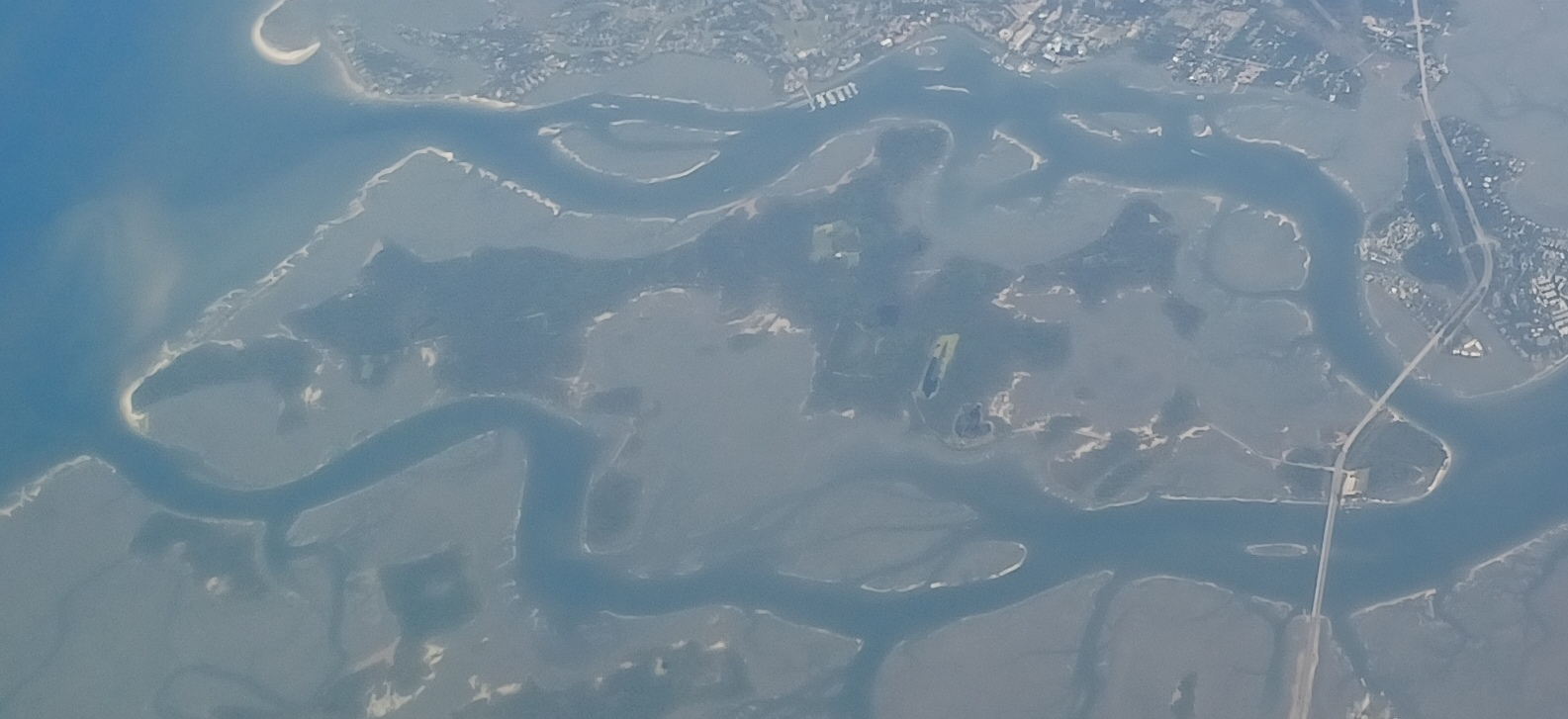
Aerial view, seen from the west

The 4,053-acre (16 km^{2}) refuge includes Pinckney Island, Corn Island, Big Harry and Little Harry Islands, Buzzard Island and numerous small hammocks. Pinckney is the largest of the islands and the only one open to public use. Nearly 67% of the refuge consists of salt marsh and tidal creeks. A wide variety of land types are found on Pinckney Island alone: saltmarsh, forestland, brushland, fallow field and freshwater ponds. In combination, these habitats support a diversity of bird and plant life.

== Wildlife ==
Wildlife commonly observed on Pinckney Island include waterfowl, shorebirds, wading birds, raptors, neo-tropical migrants, and white-tailed deer, with large concentrations of white ibis, herons, and egrets. Other species include the American alligator, flatwoods salamander, Mexican long-nosed armadillo, bald eagle, and the wood stork.

== Facilities ==
There is no visitor center at the refuge. However, there are opportunities for hiking, cycling, photography and wildlife observation.

Each year the refuge holds a one-day quota deer hunt to ensure that population numbers remain in balance with the surrounding habitat. However, fishing is prohibited from the land portions of the refuge.

=== Trails ===
There are 10 miles (16.1 km) of hiking trails on the refuge and nine recommended hikes:

- Ibis Pond - 1.2 miles (1.9 km), round trip; one and a half hours walking at a leisurely pace
- Shell Point - 4.6 miles (7.4 km), round trip; four hours and 15 minutes
- Wood Stork Pond - 2.7 miles (4.3 km), round trip; two and a half hours
- Osprey Pond - 3.0 miles (4.8 km), round trip; three hours
- Nini Chapin Pond - 3.6 miles (5.8 km), round trip; three and a half hours
- Bull Point - 5.0 miles (8.0 km), round trip; five hours
- Dick Point - 7.4 miles (11.9 km), round trip; six and a half hours
- Clubhouse Pond - 6.2 miles (10.0 km), round trip; five and a half hours
- White Point - 7.8 miles (12.6 km), round trip; seven hours

== See also ==
- List of National Wildlife Refuges
