= James Madison Barker =

American banker and business executive

- Born: March 13, 1886; Pittsfield, Massachusetts, United States
- Died: July 3, 1974 (aged 88); Chicago, Illinois, United States
- Education: Massachusetts Institute of Technology
- Occupations: civil engineer, banker, business executive
- Known for: endeavors in international affairs
- Notable work: financial viability of Iran's "Seven-Year Plan", Hoover Commission
- Spouse: Margaret Rankin (m. 1914)
- Children: 3
- Parents: Charles Trueworth Barker III (father); Emma Jane Burke Barker (mother)

James Madison Barker (March 13, 1886 – July 3, 1974) was an American banker and business executive who worked for First National Bank of Boston, Sears, Roebuck & Company, and Allstate Insurance Company.

He was born in Pittsfield, Massachusetts, the son of Charles Trueworth Barker III, a clothing salesman, and Emma Jane Burke Barker.

Barker began his career as a civil engineer, earning his degree in engineering from the Massachusetts Institute of Technology in 1903. In 1914, he married Margaret Rankin, whom he met on a trip to the Panama Canal. After the birth of their three children, Barker took a more financially stable position developing a First National Bank of Boston branch in Buenos Aires, Argentina. In order to return to the United States, he then took a position at Sears & Roebuck Co., in which he developed the concept of “time-payment” financing, which became popular in other banks and companies. He was later appointed director of Allstate Insurance, a subsidiary of Sears.

Barker made a significant impact on the business world, but his endeavors in international affairs are lesser-known. In 1948, he travelled to the Middle East to help research financial viability of Iran's "Seven-Year Plan" and write the final report for Overseas Consultants pertaining to the to reconstruct the economy. Barker did similar work with the World Bank and the Hoover Commission.

Barker died at his home in Chicago in 1974. Alfred A. Knopf Sr. wrote the Chicago Tribune after his death, recalling Barker as a "remarkable" man and close friend, and sharing his achievements outside of business:

"He had a great interest in linguistics, speaking Spanish as well as he did English, and being at home in French and German and able in Italian and Portuguese. He was a trustee of the Chicago Museum of Science and Industry and Northwestern University, an honorary trustee of the Newberry Library, a governing life member of the Art Institute of Chicago, and a proprietor of the Boston Athenæum. Howard W. Johnson, chairman of the Massachusetts Institute of Technology Corporation, wrote of him, "In his passing, the Institute lost a distinguished alumnus and adviser whose wisdom, devotion, and benefactions played a major role in the development of M.I.T. for more than four decades."
