= ACE Basin =

Ashepoo, Combahee and Edisto Basin

Coordinates: 32°39′14″N 80°32′42″W

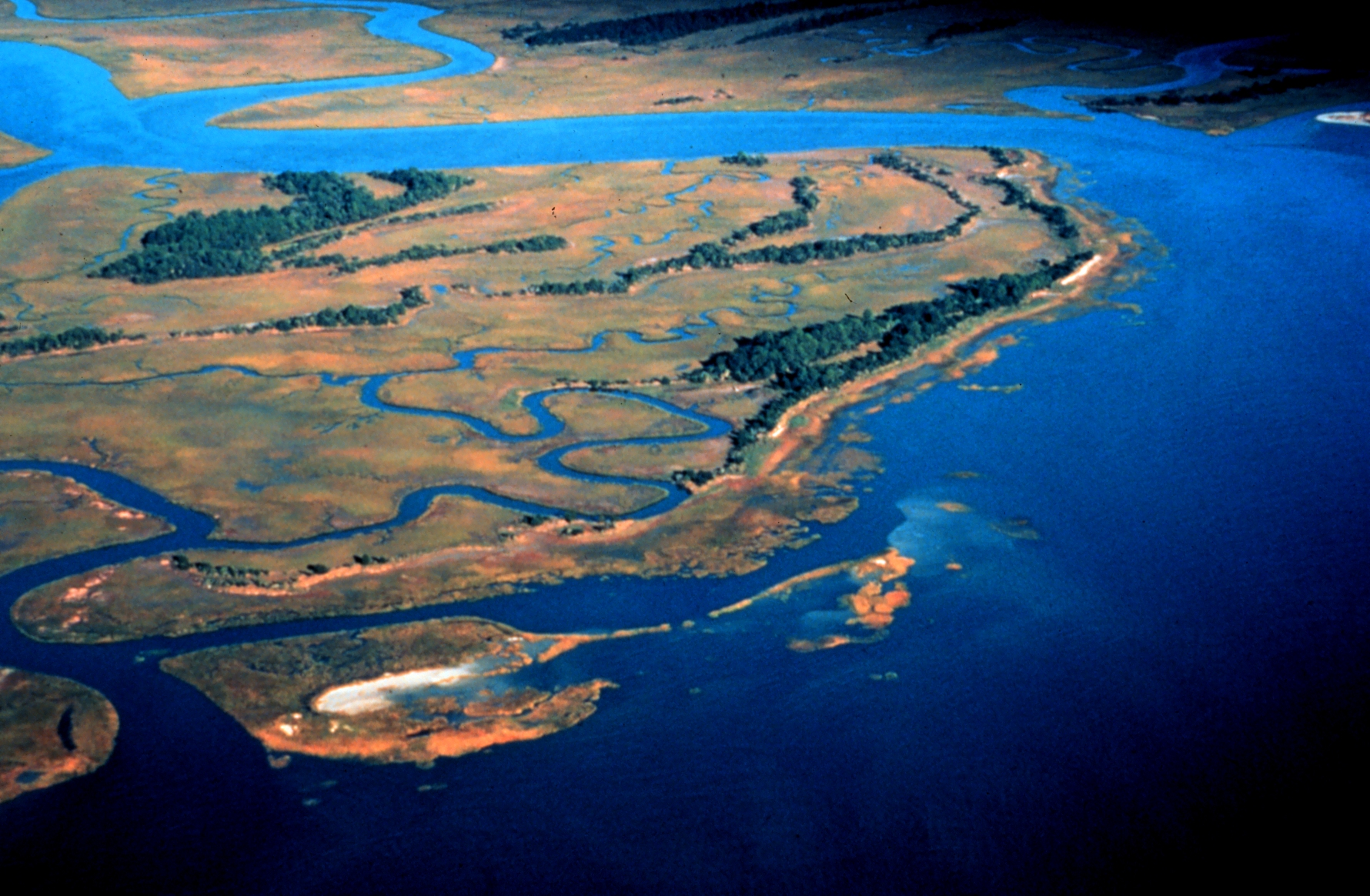
Pine Island, ACE Basin National Estuarine Research Reserve

The Ashepoo, Combahee and Edisto Basin (abbreviated as ACE Basin, spoken as ace basin) is one of the largest undeveloped estuaries along the Atlantic Coast of the United States. Located primarily in Colleton, Charleston, and Beaufort counties in South Carolina, the Ashepoo, Combahee and South Edisto rivers combine into the larger St. Helena Sound and drain a significant portion of the Lowcountry region. The 350,000 acres (1,400 km^{2}) area is known for its natural environment and the preservation of its marshes, wetlands, hardwood forests, and riverine systems and the fauna that occupy the area.

A sizable portion of the ACE Basin has been protected via a public-private partnership with contributing properties. A collaboration of federal, state, local, and private efforts have led to the preservation of 250,000 acres of land, with stakeholders controlling various interests. The umbrella organization for these efforts is the ACE Basin Task Force.

== History ==
Historically, the area was primarily agricultural, dominated by the plantation system. After the Civil War, only three plantation homes survived in the area, and much of the land became fertile ground for hunting and outdoor enthusiasts.

Development pressures emerged in the 1970s and 1980s, prompting concerned citizens to petition local, state, and federal authorities to assist with preserving the basin. In 1988, a group of concerned citizens and advocacy groups formed the ACE Basin Task Force which further formalized the cause for preservation and conservation. What emerged from these efforts became the ACE Basin Project, comprising the U.S. Fish and Wildlife Service (USFWS), the South Carolina Department of Natural Resources (SCDNR), The Nature Conservancy, Ducks Unlimited, and other private groups and companies to continue to collaborate on this endeavor.

Among the more famous individuals that have contributed to land conservation efforts include Ted Turner and the descendants of the RR Donnelley estate, which set up a foundation to support conservation efforts in the ACE Basin and throughout the Lowcountry. During his tenure in office, South Carolina's U.S. Senator Fritz Hollings procured $53.8 million for conservation efforts in the ACE Basin.

The task force celebrated 30 years of conservation efforts in December 2019. In November 2014, National Geographic had a featured article celebrating 25 years of conservation efforts in the ACE Basin.

== Geography ==
The basin is located along the southern half of South Carolina's Atlantic coastline, situated between Charleston and Beaufort. The basin's name comes after the three major rivers that drain the area: the Ashepoo, the Combahee, and the Edisto. These rivers drain primarily into the St. Helena Sound, which drains into the Atlantic Ocean between Hunting Island and Edisto Island.

The basin's boundaries are roughly defined to include all of Edisto Island and running northwesterly towards Walterboro, then heading southwest towards Garden's Corner and Yemassee before heading back towards the ocean, including all of the St. Helena Sound and Hunting Island State Park. Of the 350,000 acres (1,400 km^{2}) that are comprised by this area, nearly half are officially monitored by the National Estuarine Research Reserve system.

== Protected areas ==
Listed below is a partial list of protected areas in the ACE Basin, not including private conservation easements:

The ACE Basin National Estuarine Research Reserve was formed in 1992 and is a partnership between the National Oceanic and Atmospheric Administration (NOAA) and the South Carolina Department of Natural Resources (SCDNR). The reserve itself consists of over 140,000 acres (570 km^{2}) which consists of a mixture of upland and lowland that is publicly protected or privately owned. In essence, it is an overlay area and is not in direct control or ownership of any specific land area. NERR staff monitors indicators such as flora/fauna livelihood and water quality, provides educational and scientific support to visitors and researchers and offers training programs for conservationists and other stakeholders.

The Ernest F. Hollings ACE Basin National Wildlife Refuge is a federally protected, 11,815 acres (48 km^{2}) national wildlife refuge made up of two units: the Edisto River unit (7,200 acres (29 km^{2})) and the Combahee River unit (4,564 acres (18.5 km^{2})). The refuge operates an office out of the Grove Plantation House which receives visitors and hosts various educational and scientific programs and research projects.

The Bear Island Wildlife Management Area is a 12,021 acres (49 km^{2}) reserve that is managed by SCDNR. The area is open to the public from early February to late October and is a popular spot for hiking, biking, birding, fishing, and hunting. A wide variety of waterfowl species inhabit the area. The area shuts down periodically for special hunts.

The Donnelley Wildlife Management Area is an 8,041 acres (33 km^{2}) reserve that is managed by SCDNR. The area is open to the public year-round, however hunting season from early November to early February restricts access for hikers, bikers, horseback riders, and other non-hunting activities. The area is named after the Donnelley family, which was instrumental in the ACE Basin Project's history and features a wide mix of landscapes and fauna.

The St. Helena Sound Heritage Preserve is a 10,301 acres (42 km^{2}) area managed by SCDNR that consists of several small upland and lowland islands located along the northern shore of the St. Helena Sound. These islands are far-reaching and offer archery hunting for deer (November only) and primitive camping opportunities. Otter Island in particular has further protections due to its unique and rare plant species and its historic status.

Additional contributing properties include:

- Edisto Interpretive Center
- Edisto Beach State Park
- Great Swamp Sanctuary
- Hunting Island State Park
- Ravenel Caw Caw Interpretive Center

== Access ==
The principal road through the ACE Basin is U.S. Highway 17 (the ACE Basin Parkway), which skirts the northern reaches of the protected areas and providing transportation connection between the areas clustered around Charleston, Beaufort and Savannah. Small hamlets do exist in the ACE Basin, including the communities of Bennetts Point, Green Pond, Jacksonboro, Wiggins and Willtown Bluff. The largest community in close proximity is Walterboro, accessible via S.C. Highway 303 and S.C. Highway 64.

There are 23 boat landings in the 350,000 acres (1,400 km^{2}) region, mostly maintained by state or county government agencies. Four of these landings are canoe or kayak launch only.
