= Green Pond, South Carolina =

Human settlement in Spartanburg County, South Carolina

Coordinates: 32°43′53.2″N 80°36′56.8″W

Green Pond is an unincorporated community in Colleton County, in the U.S. state of South Carolina. It is located along U.S. Route 17 northeast of White Hall and west of Ashepoo, and South Carolina Highway 303 south of Ashepoo Crossing and Walterboro. The community also had a railroad station on the Charleston and Savannah Railway, a line which today is part of the CSX Charleston Subdivision.

== History ==
The community was named for a nearby pool of water abundant with algae, according to local history.

== See also ==
- Raid on Combahee Ferry
- Donnelley Wildlife Management Area
