= Overseas Consultants =

Overseas Consultants Inc. was formed by the merger of eleven top U.S. engineering and management firms in the 1940s. In one of its first major undertakings, the company conducted a six-month industrial reparations survey of post-World War II Japan in 1947. It ultimately prepared a report for General Douglas MacArthur. MacArthur's general view, however, was that Japan had already paid a heavy price, in that the war had totally shattered the Japanese economy, and Japan had lost all of the territories it had occupied in Manchuria, Korea, North China and the outer islands. (740.00119 Control (Japan)/3-2548, Report by the Director of the Policy Planning Staff (Kennan), March 25, 1948). The company presented several reports to the Secretary of the Army.

The company also did work in underdeveloped countries. In the late 1940s, many poor countries desired to raise their standard of living by increasing output of food, natural resources and manufactured goods. Iran, for example, made a noteworthy start toward this end by engaging Overseas Consultants Inc. to advise on a proposed US$650,000,000 development program. (TIME Magazine, Oct. 24, 1949). The company conducted a detailed study that ultimately resulted in a multi-volume report. Today, the report provides invaluable historical insight into the economic development of Iran as of the late 1940s. Unfortunately, implementation of the plan fizzled out because the impoverished Iranian government lacked sufficient funds. Foreign aid donors - during, in part, the brief rule of Prime Minister Mohammed Mossadeq - did not provide money for implementation. (TIME Magazine, Jun. 4, 1951). The foreign aid donors were not forthcoming because Mossadeq and the Iranian government wished to see those funds or loans benefit Iran's oil industry directly, not benefit the Iranian-Anglo Oil company exclusively, which was owned principally by the British government.

OCI was represented by the law firm of Sullivan & Cromwell, two of whose employees and partners were John Foster Dulles and Allen Dulles who in 1950 were not yet fully part of the U.S. government. When the OCI contract was thwarted by Mossadeq and the Iranian Parliament, John Foster Dulles and Allen Dulles declared personal war on Mossadeq. Once the two Dulles brothers officially entered United States government in 1953 as the Secretary of State and the Director of the CIA they arranged, with the help of Christopher Montague Woodhouse, the former chief of British intelligence in Iran, and head of the British Secret Intelligence Service, Sir John Sinclair, often referred to as "C", to overthrow Mohammed Mossadeq's government. The overthrow was overseen by Frank Wisner, a friend of Allen Dulles in Washington and a subordinate at the CIA. The onsite partner in the overthrow and CIA employee was Kermit Roosevelt. Mohammed Mossadeq detested Communism and considered the new President, General Eisenhower, a friend. Mossadeq's main crime was to thwart the profits of the Dulles brothers personally, their firm Sullivan & Cromwell, their clients OCI, the J. Schroder Banking Corporation, and Chase Manhattan Bank. The two banking clients appear to be minor players, the identity of the eleven engineering and consulting firms remains obscure and their pervasive influence in the post war rebuilding process something that needs to be further researched.

Overseas Consultants also worked in such remote places as the southern highlands of Central Africa, studying vegetation and soils with respect to possible railroad construction.
