= Donnelley Wildlife Management Area =

Protected area in South Carolina, United States

Coordinates: 32°25′00″N 80°25′00″W

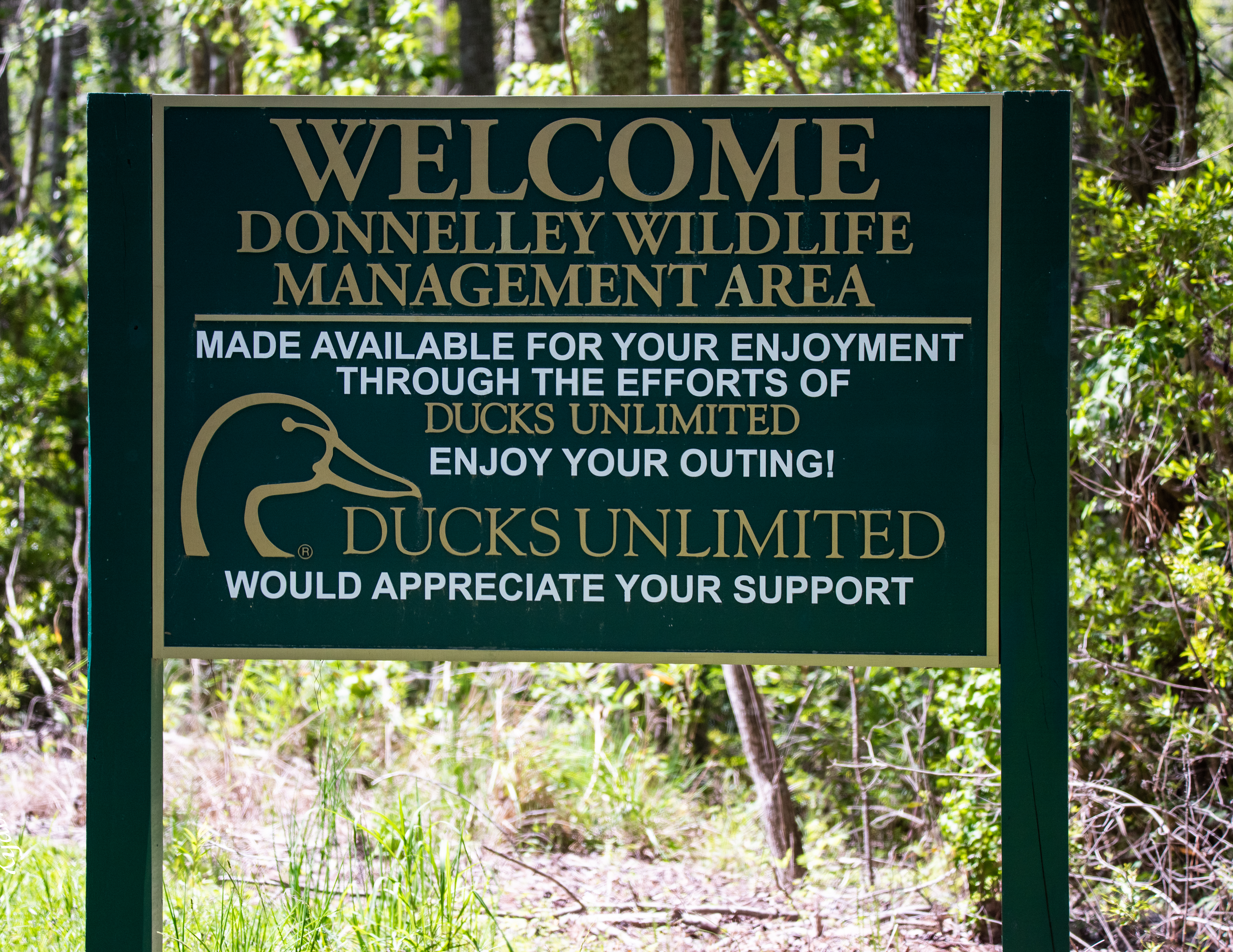
Donnelley Wildlife Management Area

Donnelley Wildlife Management Area or Donnelley WMA is an undeveloped 8,048-acre (32.57 km^{2}) natural area in Colleton County, South Carolina near the unincorporated area of Green Pond. Named after Gaylord and Dorothy Donnelley who were instrumental in leading land preservation efforts in the ACE Basin, Donnelley WMA is owned and managed by the South Carolina Department of Natural Resources (SCDNR).

== See also ==
- ACE Basin
