= Combahee River =

River in South Carolina, United States of America

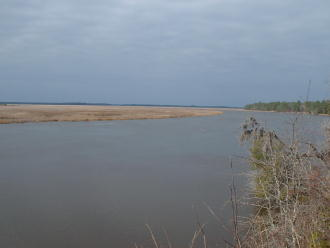
- The Combahee River as seen from the Harriet Tubman Bridge along U.S. Highway 17

- Location of mouth

Location
- Country: United States
- State: South Carolina
- Counties: Colleton, Beaufort, Hampton

Physical characteristics
- Source
  - coordinates: 32.7918393°N 80.8798286°W
- Mouth

The Combahee River (/kəmˈbiː/ kəm-BEE) is a short blackwater river in the southern Lowcountry region of South Carolina formed at the confluence of the Salkehatchie and Little Salkehatchie rivers near the Islandton community of Colleton County, South Carolina. Part of its lower drainage basin combines with the Ashepoo River and the Edisto River to form the ACE Basin. The Combahee empties into Saint Helena Sound near Beaufort, which in turn empties into the Atlantic Ocean.

== History ==
The river is named for its first inhabitants, the Combahee tribe of Native Americans. Europeans occupied the area as early as the 1680s, and so the Combahee and others of the Cusabo group are also known as Settlement Indians. Land was set aside for the Yemassee people along several rivers, including the Combahee. The Yemassee War of 1715–1717 saw skirmishes in the area.

On August 27, 1782, one of the last fights in the Revolutionary War took place along the Combahee River. The British made an attempt at foraging, which the Americans, headed by General Mordecai Gist and Colonel John Laurens, opposed. Laurens, the son of Henry Laurens, a former president of the Continental Congress, died in the action.

The Combahee River bordered and supplied the water for some of the largest, most productive rice plantations prior to the Civil War. It was the site of an important military incident during that conflict, the Raid at Combahee Ferry. This was a Union raid into the interior of South Carolina, which freed over 750 slaves. Harriet Tubman, an escaped slave herself, well known for leading others hundreds of miles to safety on the Underground Railway, led this endeavor on June 2, 1863. The bridge across the Combahee on US Highway 17 is the location today.

== Cultural legacy ==
The Combahee River Collective was a Black feminist lesbian organization, formed in 1974 and named after the Combahee River Raid, where Harriet Tubman led 750 freed slaves to safety. The Collective was instrumental in highlighting that the white feminist movement was not addressing the particular needs of black women. They are perhaps best known for developing the Combahee River Collective Statement, a key document in the history of contemporary Black feminism and the development of the concepts of identity as used among political organizers and social theorists.

== See also ==
- Combahee River Collective
