= Ashepoo River =

River in South Carolina, United States of America

- Location of mouth Ashepoo River (the United States)

Location
- Country: United States
- State: South Carolina
- County: Colleton

Physical characteristics
- Source
  - coordinates: 32.8973926°N 80.6937134°W
- Mouth
  - location: Saint Helena Sound
  - coordinates: 32°29′25″N 80°25′25″W

The Ashepoo River is a short blackwater river in South Carolina, United States. It rises in a confluence of swamps south of Walterboro, flows in a southeast direction and empties into Saint Helena Sound at 32.49°N 80.42389°W. The entire course of the river lies within the boundaries of Colleton County.

The Ashepoo basin forms part of the ACE Basin, a coastal conservation area that encompasses its bottomlands confluence with the Combahee and Edisto river basins. (The refuge's name is formed from the first letters of the names of the three rivers: A-C-E).

The name comes from the Ashepoo subtribe of the Cusabo Indians.

Caeser P. Chisolm received a charter to operate ferry service across the Ashepoo River.

During the American Civil War the river was the site of an incursion between Union and Confederate troops. The 34th Infantry Regiment was ordered to burn a railroad trestle near the river, they boarded the troop steamer Boston but became stranded on an oyster bed. The stranded boat was shelled by nearby Confederate batteries. The men on board were ferried off under fire by Union troops led by George W. Brush.
