= Colleton County, South Carolina =

County in South Carolina, United States

- County
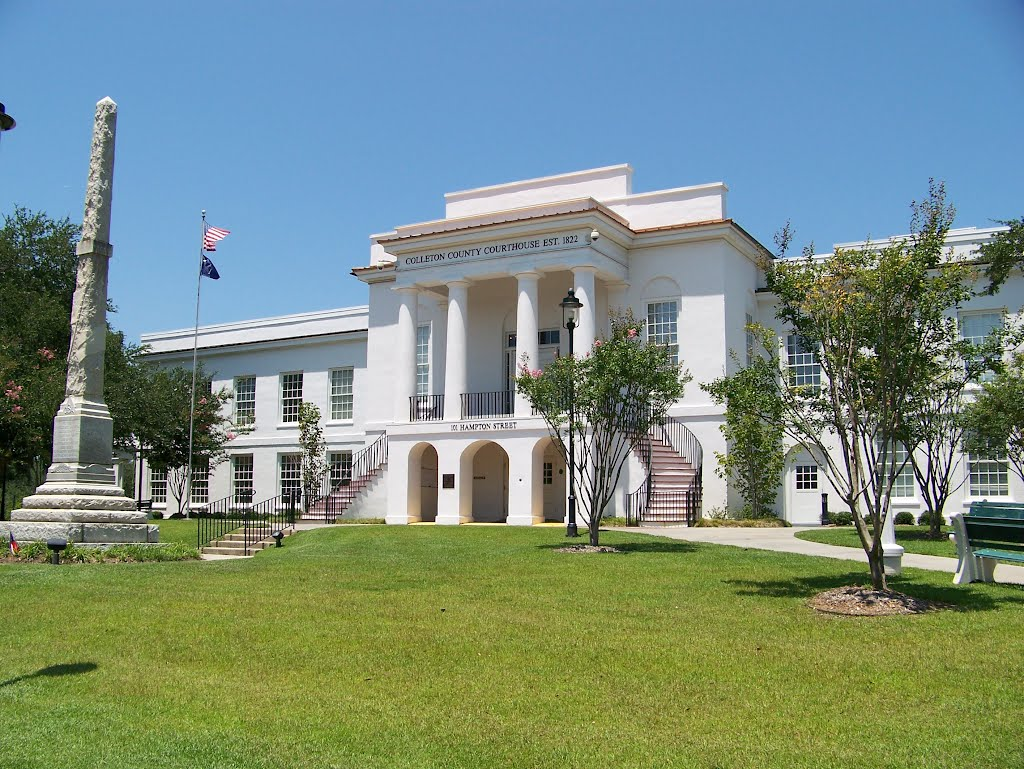
- Colleton County Courthouse

- Seal

- Location within the U.S. state of South Carolina
- Interactive map of Colleton County, South Carolina
- Coordinates: 32.84°N 80.66°W
- Country: United States
- State: South Carolina
- Founded: 1800
- Named for: Sir John Colleton, 1st Baronet
- Seat: Walterboro
- Largest community: Walterboro

Area
  - Total: 1,133.28 sq mi (2,935.2 km^{2})
  - Land: 1,056.50 sq mi (2,736.3 km^{2})
  - Water: 76.78 sq mi (198.9 km^{2}) 6.78%

Population (2020)
  - Total: 38,604
  - Estimate (2025): 39,382 ▲
  - Density: 36.540/sq mi (14.108/km^{2})
- Time zone: UTC−5 (Eastern)
  - Summer (DST): UTC−4 (EDT)
- Congressional districts: 1st, 6th
- Website: www.colletoncounty.org

Colleton County is a county in the Lowcountry region of the U.S. state of South Carolina. As of the 2020 census, the population was 38,604. Its county seat is Walterboro. The county is named after Sir John Colleton, 1st Baronet, one of the eight Lords Proprietor of the Province of Carolina. After two previous incarnations, the current Colleton County was created in 1800.

== History ==
In 1682, Colleton was created as one of the three original proprietary counties, located in the southwestern coastal portion of the new South Carolina Colony and bordering on the Combahee River.

In 1706, the county was divided between the new Saint Bartholomew and Saint Paul parishes. This area was developed for large plantations devoted to rice and indigo cultivation as commodity crops. The planters depended on the labor of African slaves transported to Charleston for that purpose. In the coastal areas, black slaves soon outnumbered white colonists, as they did across the colony by 1708.

In 1734, most of the coastal portion of Saint Paul's Parish was separated to form the new Saint John's Colleton Parish. In 1769, the three parishes were absorbed into the Charleston Judicial District, the southwestern portion of which was referred to as Saint Bartholomew's.

In 1800, the new Colleton District was formed from the western half of the Charleston District. In 1816, it annexed a small portion of the northwestern Charleston District.

In 1868, under the Reconstruction era new state constitution, South Carolina districts were reorganized as counties. Officials were to be elected by the resident voters rather than by state officials, as was done previously, thus giving more democratic power to local residents.

In 1897, the northeastern portion of the county was separated to form the new Dorchester County, with its seat at St. George.

In 1911, the portion of the county east of the Edisto River was annexed by Charleston County. In 1919 and again in 1920, tiny portions of northwestern Colleton County were annexed to Bamberg County.

In March 1975, the town of Edisto Beach was annexed to Colleton County from Charleston County, thus bringing the county to its present size.

== Geography ==
According to the U.S. Census Bureau, the county has a total area of 1,133.28 square miles (2,935.2 km^{2}), of which 1,056.50 square miles (2,736.3 km^{2}) is land and 76.78 square miles (198.9 km^{2}) (6.78%) is water. It is the fifth-largest county in South Carolina by land area and fourth-largest by total area.

=== National protected area ===
- Ashepoo-Combahee-Edisto (ACE) Basin National Estuarine Research Reserve (part)
- Ernest F. Hollings ACE Basin National Wildlife Refuge (part)

=== State and local protected areas/sites ===
- Bear Island Wildlife Management Area
- Colleton State Park
- Crosby Oxypolis Heritage Preserve
- Donnelley Wildlife Management Area
- Givhans Ferry State Park (part)
- Lowcountry Raptors
- Old Walterboro Train Depot
- Pon-Pon Chapel of Ease
- South Fenwick Island
- St. Helena Sound Heritage Preserve/Wildlife Management Area
- Tuskegee Airmen Memorial
- Walterboro Historic District

=== Major water bodies ===
- Ashepoo River
- Atlantic Ocean (North Atlantic Ocean)
- Edisto River
- Intracoastal Waterway
- Salkehatchie River

=== Adjacent counties ===
- Orangeburg County – north
- Dorchester County – northeast
- Charleston County – east
- Beaufort County – south
- Hampton County – west
- Allendale County – west
- Bamberg County – northwest

=== Major highways ===
- I-95
- US 15
- US 17
- US 17 Alt.
- US 21
- US 601
- SC 61
- SC 63
- SC 64
- SC 64 Bus.
- SC 174
- SC 212
- SC 212 Conn.
- SC 217
- SC 303
- SC 362
- SC 641
- SC 651

=== Major infrastructure ===
- Lowcountry Regional Airport

== Demographics ==
Historical population
Census	Pop.	Note	%±
1800	24,903		—
1810	26,359		5.8%
1820	26,404		0.2%
1830	27,256		3.2%
1840	25,548		−6.3%
1850	39,505		54.6%
1860	41,916		6.1%
1870	25,410		−39.4%
1880	38,386		51.1%
1890	40,293		5.0%
1900	33,452		−17.0%
1910	35,390		5.8%
1920	29,897		−15.5%
1930	25,821		−13.6%
1940	26,268		1.7%
1950	28,242		7.5%
1960	27,816		−1.5%
1970	27,622		−0.7%
1980	31,776		15.0%
1990	34,377		8.2%
2000	38,264		11.3%
2010	38,892		1.6%
2020	38,604		−0.7%
2025 (est.)	39,382	▲	2.0%
U.S. Decennial Census; 1790–1960 1900–1990; 1990–2000 2010 2020

=== Racial and ethnic composition ===
Colleton County, South Carolina – Racial and ethnic composition Note: the US Census treats Hispanic/Latino as an ethnic category. This table excludes Latinos from the racial categories and assigns them to a separate category. Hispanics/Latinos may be of any race.
Race / Ethnicity (NH = Non-Hispanic)	Pop 1980	Pop 1990	Pop 2000	Pop 2010	Pop 2020	% 1980	% 1990	% 2000	% 2010	% 2020
White alone (NH)	17,057	18,603	21,081	21,736	21,816	53.68%	54.11%	55.09%	55.89%	56.51%
Black or African American alone (NH)	14,058	15,395	16,021	15,109	13,401	44.24%	44.78%	41.87%	38.85%	34.71%
Native American or Alaska Native alone (NH)	147	165	240	308	302	0.46%	0.48%	0.63%	0.79%	0.78%
Asian alone (NH)	33	35	94	125	186	0.10%	0.10%	0.25%	0.32%	0.48%
Native Hawaiian or Pacific Islander alone (NH)	x	x	12	7	16	x	x	0.03%	0.02%	0.04%
Other race alone (NH)	8	3	10	24	101	0.03%	0.01%	0.03%	0.06%	0.26%
Mixed race or Multiracial (NH)	x	x	255	489	1,402	x	x	0.67%	1.26%	3.63%
Hispanic or Latino (any race)	473	176	551	1,094	1,380	1.49%	0.51%	1.44%	2.81%	3.57%
Total	31,776	34,377	38,264	38,892	38,604	100.00%	100.00%	100.00%	100.00%	100.00%

=== 2020 census ===
As of the 2020 census, there were 38,604 people, 15,808 households, and 9,565 families residing in the county.

The median age was 44.9 years. 21.2% of residents were under the age of 18 and 22.0% were 65 years of age or older. For every 100 females there were 94.3 males, and for every 100 females age 18 and over there were 92.0 males age 18 and over.

The racial makeup of the county was 57.2% White, 34.9% Black or African American, 0.9% American Indian and Alaska Native, 0.5% Asian, 0.0% Native Hawaiian and Pacific Islander, 2.1% from some other race, and 4.5% from two or more races. Hispanic or Latino residents of any race comprised 3.6% of the population.

23.9% of residents lived in urban areas, while 76.1% lived in rural areas.

There were 15,808 households in the county, of which 27.2% had children under the age of 18 living with them and 32.2% had a female householder with no spouse or partner present. About 29.8% of all households were made up of individuals and 14.6% had someone living alone who was 65 years of age or older.

There were 19,824 housing units, of which 20.3% were vacant. Among occupied housing units, 73.5% were owner-occupied and 26.5% were renter-occupied. The homeowner vacancy rate was 1.7% and the rental vacancy rate was 11.3%.

=== 2010 census ===
At the 2010 census, there were 38,892 people, 15,131 households, and 10,449 families living in the county. The population density was 36.8 inhabitants per square mile (14.2/km^{2}). There were 19,901 housing units at an average density of 18.8 per square mile (7.3/km^{2}). The racial makeup of the county was 57.0% white, 39.0% black or African American, 0.8% American Indian, 0.3% Asian, 1.3% from other races, and 1.5% from two or more races. Those of Hispanic or Latino origin made up 2.8% of the population.

Of the 15,131 households, 33.5% had children under the age of 18 living with them, 44.9% were married couples living together, 18.4% had a female householder with no husband present, 30.9% were non-families, and 26.8% of all households were made up of individuals. The average household size was 2.54 and the average family size was 3.07. The median age was 40.7 years.

The median income for a household in the county was $33,263 and the median income for a family was $40,955. Males had a median income of $36,622 versus $25,898 for females. The per capita income for the county was $17,842. About 17.7% of families and 21.3% of the population were below the poverty line, including 28.3% of those under age 18 and 17.2% of those age 65 or over.

=== 2000 census ===
At the 2000 census, there were 38,264 people, 14,470 households, and 10,490 families living in the county. The population density was 36 people per square mile (14 people/km^{2}). There were 18,129 housing units at an average density of 17 per square mile (6.6/km^{2}). The racial makeup of the county was 55.52% White, 42.18% Black or African American, 0.63% Native American, 0.25% Asian, 0.04% Pacific Islander, 0.56% from other races, and 0.82% from two or more races. 1.44% of the population were Hispanic or Latino of any race.

There were 14,470 households, out of which 33.10% had children under the age of 18 living with them, 51.10% were married couples living together, 16.80% had a female householder with no husband present, and 27.50% were non-families. 24.00% of all households were made up of individuals, and 10.10% had someone living alone who was 65 years of age or older. The average household size was 2.62 and the average family size was 3.11.

In the county, the population was spread out, with 27.50% under the age of 18, 8.00% from 18 to 24, 26.90% from 25 to 44, 24.70% from 45 to 64, and 12.90% who were 65 years of age or older. The median age was 36 years. For every 100 females there were 91.90 males. For every 100 females age 18 and over, there were 87.90 males.

The median income for a household in the county was $29,733, and the median income for a family was $34,169. Males had a median income of $28,518 versus $19,228 for females. The per capita income for the county was $14,831. About 17.30% of families and 21.10% of the population were below the poverty line, including 28.70% of those under age 18 and 19.10% of those age 65 or over.

According to the 2000 census, the Colleton County population was nearly 75% rural, with the exception of the Walterboro Urban Cluster (2000 pop.: 10,064). The total county population was also designated as the Walterboro, SC Micropolitan Statistical Area.

=== Ancestry/ethnicity ===
As of 2019, the largest self-identified ancestry/ethnicity groups in Colleton County were:

Ancestry/ethnicity	Percent (2019)
African-American (United States)	39.0%
English (England)	32.3%
German (Germany)	6.5%
Irish (Republic of Ireland)	5.2%

== Law and government ==
=== Law enforcement ===
In 2019, County Sheriff R.A. Strickland was charged with domestic violence after punching a woman in his home. As of 2021, the current sheriff is Guerry L. "Buddy" Hill Jr.

=== Politics ===
United States presidential election results for Colleton County, South Carolina
Year	Republican		Democratic		Third party(ies)	
Year	No.	%	No.	%	No.	%
1900	121	11.98%	889	88.02%	0	0.00%
1904	131	8.44%	1,421	91.56%	0	0.00%
1912	14	1.70%	797	96.84%	12	1.46%
1916	31	3.08%	974	96.82%	1	0.10%
1920	15	1.49%	990	98.51%	0	0.00%
1924	11	1.35%	800	98.40%	2	0.25%
1928	22	1.92%	1,122	97.99%	1	0.09%
1932	5	0.26%	1,908	99.69%	1	0.05%
1936	8	0.54%	1,463	99.46%	0	0.00%
1940	65	5.15%	1,197	94.85%	0	0.00%
1944	45	2.25%	1,653	82.77%	299	14.97%
1948	39	1.50%	223	8.58%	2,337	89.92%
1952	2,760	59.16%	1,905	40.84%	0	0.00%
1956	635	15.69%	1,463	36.14%	1,950	48.17%
1960	2,521	56.23%	1,962	43.77%	0	0.00%
1964	4,637	69.33%	2,051	30.67%	0	0.00%
1968	2,824	34.67%	2,651	32.55%	2,670	32.78%
1972	5,723	69.51%	2,376	28.86%	134	1.63%
1976	3,324	39.00%	5,134	60.24%	64	0.75%
1980	4,719	44.76%	5,745	54.49%	79	0.75%
1984	6,200	55.63%	4,910	44.06%	35	0.31%
1988	4,962	51.97%	4,508	47.22%	77	0.81%
1992	4,545	40.17%	5,455	48.21%	1,314	11.61%
1996	4,462	42.90%	5,329	51.24%	610	5.86%
2000	6,767	50.54%	6,449	48.16%	174	1.30%
2004	7,264	51.50%	6,699	47.49%	143	1.01%
2008	8,525	49.22%	8,616	49.74%	180	1.04%
2012	8,443	49.41%	8,475	49.60%	168	0.98%
2016	9,091	52.70%	7,627	44.21%	533	3.09%
2020	10,440	54.14%	8,602	44.61%	241	1.25%
2024	10,696	58.52%	7,376	40.36%	204	1.12%

As a part of the “Solid South," Colleton County was heavily Democratic throughout its early history. More recently, it has become a Republican-leaning swing county that has backed the national winner in every presidential election since 1984, with the exception of 2020.

== Economy ==
In 2022, the GDP of Colleton County was $1.1 billion (approx. $29,203 per capita). Its real GDP was $933.3 million in chained 2017 dollars ($24,010 per capita). In 2022 through 2024, the unemployment rate has fluctuated between 2.6-4.3%.

Some of the largest employers include Colleton County School District, Cracker Barrel, Food Lion, and Walmart.

Employment and Wage Statistics by Industry in Colleton County, South Carolina
Industry	Employment Counts	Employment Percentage (%)	Average Annual Wage ($)
Accommodation and Food Services	1,325	14.1	21,840
Administrative and Support and Waste Management and Remediation Services	629	6.7	35,568
Agriculture, Forestry, Fishing and Hunting	435	4.6	51,272
Arts, Entertainment, and Recreation	135	1.4	34,580
Construction	537	5.7	59,748
Finance and Insurance	234	2.5	66,404
Health Care and Social Assistance	1,456	15.5	47,216
Information	152	1.6	79,196
Management of Companies and Enterprises	4	0.0	459,680
Manufacturing	776	8.3	52,832
Other Services (except Public Administration)	173	1.8	35,932
Professional, Scientific, and Technical Services	264	2.8	55,328
Public Administration	1,056	11.3	52,156
Real Estate and Rental and Leasing	109	1.2	49,036
Retail Trade	1,606	17.1	31,096
Transportation and Warehousing	195	2.1	80,548
Utilities	59	0.6	89,960
Wholesale Trade	228	2.4	124,904
Total	9,373	100.0%	45,898

== Education ==
- Colleton County School District operates public schools, including Colleton County High School.
- Degrees can be earned at the University of South Carolina Salkehatchie in Walterboro.

== Communities ==
=== Cities ===
- Walterboro (county seat and largest community)

=== Towns ===
- Cottageville
- Edisto Beach
- Lodge
- Smoaks
- Williams

=== Census-designated places ===
- Islandton
- Jacksonboro

=== Unincorporated communities ===
- Ashepoo
- Green Pond
- Hendersonville
- Neyles
- Round O
- Ruffin
- Canadys

== See also ==
- List of counties in South Carolina
- National Register of Historic Places listings in Colleton County, South Carolina
