= Edisto River =

River in South Carolina, United States

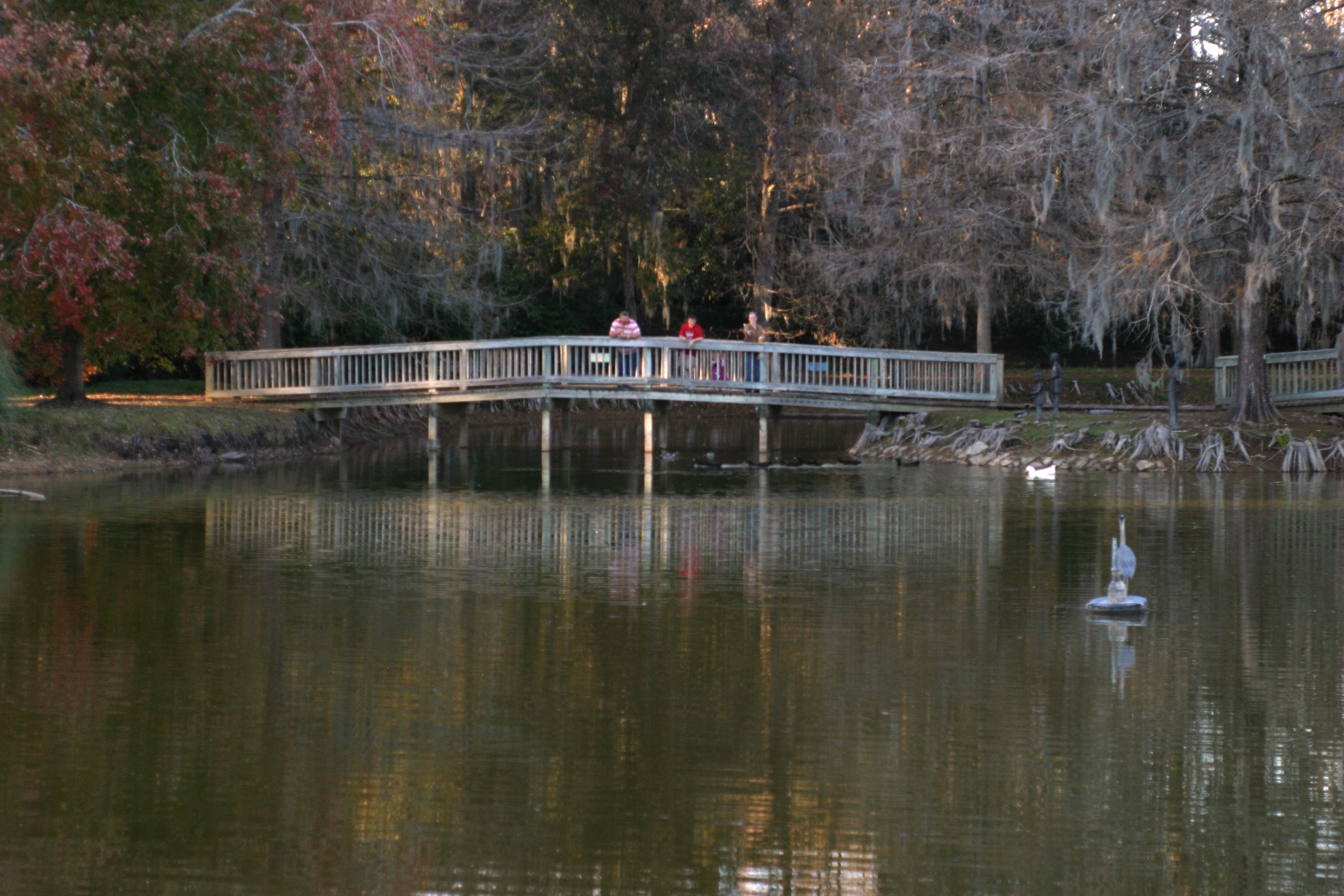
- Feeding ducks in winter time at Edisto Gardens alongside the Edisto River, Orangeburg, South Carolina

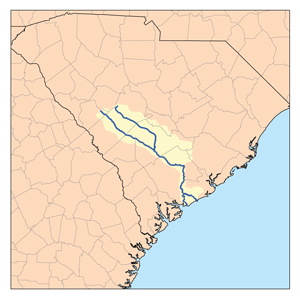
- Edisto River watershed

- Location of mouth
- Etymology: Named for the Edisto people

Location
- Country: United States
- State: South Carolina
- Counties: Charleston, Colleton, Dorchester, Bamberg, Orangeburg

Physical characteristics
- Source
  - coordinates: 33°15′46″N 80°53′11″W
- Mouth
  - location: Edisto Beach, Atlantic Ocean
  - coordinates: 32°39′16″N 80°23′17″W
  - elevation: 0 ft (0 m)
- Length: over 250 mi (400 km)

The Edisto River is one of the longest free-flowing blackwater rivers in North America, flowing over 250 meandering miles from its sources in Saluda and Edgefield counties, to its Atlantic Ocean mouth at Edisto Beach, South Carolina. It rises in two main tributaries (North Fork & South Fork) from springs under the Sandhills region of West Central South Carolina, just to the south of the Piedmont Fall Line. It is the longest and largest river system completely contained within the borders of South Carolina. Its name comes from the Edisto subtribe of the Cusabo Indians.

Near the coast, part of the river was once known as the Ponpon River. The Dawhoo River (sometimes Dawho, or Dawhoe) connects the Edisto to the North Edisto River, also the confluence of the Wadmalaw and the Toogoodoo rivers, where they meet the Atlantic Ocean. Between the coast and the Dawhoo River, the river is known as the South Edisto River.

The Edisto system flows through only one major town or city, Orangeburg, the location of Edisto Gardens (on the North Fork). The river system, being blackwater throughout its entire length, flows through highly intermittent bottom swampland. During an excessively rainy season, the river will leave its main channel, with its flow basin increasing to over a mile or more of total width. The lower Edisto basin forms a crucial part of the ACE Basin, an area that encompasses its bottomlands confluence with the Ashepoo and Combahee river basins.

A major tributary is Four Holes Swamp, which is unique in that it has no single defined channel, but rather a network of braided channels.

== Conservation ==
=== Wildlife ===
Common fish by biomass in the freshwater portions of the Edisto include spotted sucker (Minytrema melanops), bowfin (Amia calva), flat bullhead (Ameiurus platycephalus), largemouth bass (Micropterus salmoides), common carp (Cyprinus carpio), longnose gar (Lepisosteus osseus), and American eel (Anguilla rostrata). Redbreast sunfish (Lepomis auritus) is the species most prized by anglers.

=== Edisto Riverkeeper ===
The Edisto Riverkeeper is a non-profit 501(c)(3) organization working to ensure equal access to drinkable, fishable, and swimmable water in the Edisto River basin and its surrounding aquifers and tributaries. As one of over 330 members of the Waterkeeper Alliance, Edisto Riverkeeper seeks to encourage balanced usage of the basin's water resources for residents, industry, and municipalities to utilize and enjoy through education, advocacy, and accountability.

=== Friends of the Edisto ===
Friends of the Edisto, Inc. FRED, a non-profit organization, was established in 1998 to facilitate conservation of natural resources and to encourage and support sustainable economic development within the Edisto River Basin in South Carolina

=== Edisto River Canoe and Kayak Trail ===
Edisto River Canoe and Kayak Trail "ERCK" is a group of volunteers committed to the preservation of the Edisto River, educating people on safe paddling, and emphasizing the enjoyment of paddling. All instructors are American Canoe Association certified.

== History ==
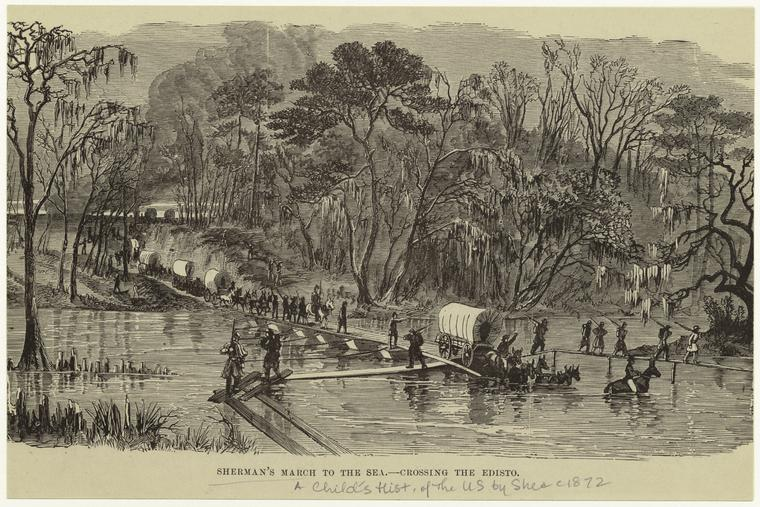
Lithograph of Sherman's Army crossing the Edisto River during the Carolinas campaign in the American Civil War from 1872 children's textbook.

In late August and early September 1718 pirate captains Charles Yeats and Charles Vane were anchored off Sullivan's Island, capturing ships as they left Charles Town harbor. After a number of disagreements Yeats fled from Vane, sailing up the Edisto River for shelter; Vane tried to pursue him but broke off. Yeats was ultimately pardoned:

...for Yeats having often attempted to quit this Course of Life, took an Opportunity in the Night, to leave Vane and to run into North-Edisto River, to the Southward of Charles-Town, and surrendered to his Majesty’s Pardon.

== See also ==
- List of National Wildlife Refuges of the United States
- South Atlantic-Gulf water resource region
- List of waterways forming and crossings of the Atlantic Intracoastal Waterway
