= List of parishes and parish churches in South Carolina =

The parish system in South Carolina was created by an act of the Commons House of Assembly, commonly called the Church Act, on November 30, 1706. Ten parishes were named within three existing counties (Craven, Berkeley, and Colleton). The act established the Church of England as the official, state-supported religion in the colony and designated an Anglican church to serve each parish. The act described how parishes were to be governed, modeled after the parish systems of England and Barbados. The functions of commissioner, rector, churchwarden, vestry, register, receiver, and clerk were delineated. Parishes served both a secular and ecclesiastical function. As the population of the province expanded north, east, and west of Charleston, legislation established additional parishes, often from land within an existing parish. By the American Revolution there were 24 parishes in South Carolina. The largest was St. Mark's, at 6,089 square miles when it was established in 1757, and the smallest, at 2 square miles, St. Michael's on the lower Charleston peninsula. The parish system was abolished in 1865 and replaced by districts.

Of the colonial parish churches of South Carolina, two in Charleston merit special attention. St. Philip's Church, on the peninsula, often known as the "mother church," has the oldest congregation south of Virginia (formed 1680). Old St. Andrew's in West Ashley is the oldest surviving church building south of Virginia still used for regular services (1706). It is also the only remaining colonial cruciform church in South Carolina (expanded 1723–33). Discrepancies in church building dates, whether in books, websites, or historical markers, are not uncommon. Those provided in the table below are the most often cited.

In addition to the parish churches that were built during colonial times, chapels were created to serve parishioners who lived distant from the parish church and wanted a church closer to them. For example, Anglicans on James Island, whose parish church was St. Andrew's, formed a congregation and began worshiping as early as 1721. The Assembly enacted legislation in 1756 designating the James Island chapel a chapel of ease and required that ministers hold services at least monthly.

== Denominational definitions ==
After the American Revolution, churches within the new states organized themselves into an association called a diocese. The Diocese of South Carolina, created in 1785, represented all the churches in the state previously aligned with the Church of England. In 1789 dioceses along the Eastern seaboard organized themselves into the Protestant Episcopal Church in the United States of America, later shortened to the Episcopal Church.

In the twentieth and twenty-first centuries, churches and dioceses began to disaffiliate from the Episcopal Church over matters of Christian doctrine, morality, and polity. In 2012 the Episcopal Diocese of South Carolina disaffiliated from the Episcopal Church. Five years later it aligned with the Anglican Church in North America.

After the 2012 split, individual churches in the diocese found themselves entangled in legal controversy. Each had to determine which denomination it would affiliate with: the diocese or the national church. Some churches immediately aligned with the Episcopal Church. For the disaffiliated churches, it took about a decade of action in the courts until legal ownership of parish property was determined. In the end, the South Carolina Supreme Court determined that seventeen disaffiliated churches could keep their property and twelve would lose it to the Episcopal Church.

The table below includes references both to Episcopal and Anglican. References to Episcopal indicate those churches (liberal, progressive) that are aligned with the Episcopal Diocese of South Carolina and the Episcopal Church. Anglican indicates those churches (conservative, orthodox) that are affiliated with the Anglican Diocese of South Carolina (or in the case of All Saints Church, Pawleys Island, the Diocese of the Carolinas) and the Anglican Church in North America.

Note that this article is not intended to discuss Catholic parishes, which were established later. The Roman Catholic Diocese of Charleston was founded in 1820.

== South Carolina parishes ==
Name	Est.	Created in (County)/from (Parish)	Area (Sq. Mi.) On Creation/ Dissolution	Area Served	Location of Parish Church
St. Philip's	1706	Berkeley County	19 / 17	Charleston peninsula	Charleston
St. Andrew's	1706	Berkeley County	266 / 139	Ashley River area (1706–17), Middle/lower Ashley River area, today's West Ashley and James Island (1717–1865)	Charleston
St. James Goose Creek	1706	Berkeley County	272 / 396	North of St. Philip's; east of St. Andrew's/St. George's Dorchester; west of St. John's Berkeley	Goose Creek
St. John's Berkeley	1706	Berkeley County	230 / 361	North of St. Thomas and St. Denis; east of St. James Goose Creek	Moncks Corner
Christ Church	1706	Berkeley County	158 / 158	Land between Charleston Harbor and the Santee River. East of St. Philip's along the Atlantic Ocean, west of St. James Santee	Mount Pleasant
St. Thomas	1706	Berkeley County	164 / 176	North of Christ Church	Charleston (Cainhoy)
St. Denis	1706	Berkeley County	Unknown	In the middle of St. Thomas Parish for French settlers	Charleston (Cainhoy)
St. James Santee	1706	Craven County (French Santee)	573 / 366	East of Christ Church, St. Thomas and St. Denis, and St. John's Berkeley	McClellanville
St. Paul's	1706	Colleton County	550 / 308	Land between South Edisto and Stono rivers and the sea islands; west of St. Andrew's	Hollywood
St. Bartholomew's	1706	Colleton County	541 / 1,076	Land between the Edisto and Combahee rivers; west of St. Paul's and St. Andrew's	Chapel in Jacksonboro
St. Helena's	1712	Granville County	1,275 / 231	Land between Combahee and Savannah rivers, including sea islands west of St. Bartholomew's and south of Prince William's	Beaufort
St. George's Dorchester	1717	St. Andrew's Parish	133 / 439	Upper Ashley River area	Dorchester (originally), Summerville
Prince George's Winyah	1721	Craven County	4,789/ 751	Area between the Cape Fear and the Santee rivers	Georgetown
St. John's Colleton	1734	St. Paul's Parish	242 / 242	Sea islands west of St. Andrew's: Johns, Wadmalaw, Edisto, Seabrook, Kiawah	Johns Island
Prince Frederick's	1734	Prince George's Winyah Parish	583 / 3,174	North of Prince George's Winyah	Plantersville
Prince William's	1745	St. Helena's Parish	569 / 441	North of St. Helena's, west of St. Bartholomew's	Sheldon/Yemassee
St. Peter's	1747	St. Helena's Parish	695 / 737	Land between the New and Savannah rivers and Georgia border	Purrysburg, Jasper County
St. Michael's	1751	St. Philip's Parish	2 / 2	Charleston, south of Broad Street on the lower peninsula; smallest parish in area	Charleston
St. Stephen's	1754	St. James Santee, Parish (English Santee)	330 / 330	North of St. James Santee, east of St. John's Berkeley	St. Stephen
St. Mark's	1757	Prince Frederick's Parish	6,089 / 4,419	First backcountry parish and largest in area; north of Prince Frederick's and St. Stephen's in High Hills of Santee	Pinewood
St. Matthew's	1765	Berkeley County	850 / 450	Backcountry, north of St. John's Berkeley, St. James Goose Creek, and St. George's Dorchester	
All Saints' Waccamaw	1767	Prince George's Winyah Parish	413 / 413	Land east of the Waccamaw River along the Atlantic Ocean to the North Carolina border	Pawleys Island
St. Luke's	1767	St. Helena's Parish	507 / 507	Land between the New and Broad rivers (Euhaws) and Hilton Head Island	Hilton Head Island
St. David's	1768	Prince Frederick's and St. Mark's parishes	2,155 / 2,155	Backcountry, north of Prince Frederick's, east of St. Mark's	Cheraw

== South Carolina parish churches ==
Parish	Current name of Parish Church	Date of Current Structure	Current Affiliation	Location	Usage
St. Philip's	St. Philip's Church	1835–38, steeple completed 1850	Anglican	Charleston (downtown)	Active
St. Andrew's	Old St. Andrew's Parish Church; see also St. James Episcopal Church, James Island, which began as a chapel in St. Andrew's Parish in 1721 and became its own church in 1831	1706, enlarged 1723–33, restored after a fire 1764; building oldest south of VA	Anglican	Charleston (West Ashley)	Active
St. James Goose Creek	St. James Goose Creek	1708–19	Anglican	Goose Creek	Occasional
St. John's Berkeley	Biggin Church; see also Strawberry Chapel	Ruins; built 1710–11, burned 1755, 1781, and ca. 1886	N/A	Moncks Corner	Strawberry Chapel: occasional
Christ Church	Christ Episcopal Church	1726–27; burned and rebuilt twice within the 1727 walls, in 1782 and 1865; large, new replica church built 1996	Episcopal	Mount Pleasant	Active
St. Thomas	St. Thomas, White Church, Brick Church; see also Pompion Hill Chapel	1707–8; burned 1815, rebuilt 1819	Unknown	Charleston (Cainhoy)	St. Thomas: unknown. Pompion Hill Chapel: occasional
St. Denis	N/A	Extinct; small church ca. 1706–68	N/A	Middle of St. Thomas, for French speaking settlers	Extinct
St. James Santee	St. James-Santee Parish Episcopal Church, The Brick Church, Wambaw Church	1768 (fourth church in the parish); chapel of ease 1890	Episcopal	McClellanville	Active
St. Paul's	None. Successor churches include St. Paul's Anglican, Summerville and Christ-St. Paul's Anglican Church, Hollywood	Site only; first built 1707, relocated to Beech Hill chapel 1737	N/A	Hollywood (Dixie Plantation/Stono Preserve)	Extinct
St. Bartholomew's	Pon Pon (The Burnt Church)	Ruins; Pon Pon Chapel built 1754 when a parish church was never constructed; burned 1796–1804	N/A	Jacksonboro	Extinct
St. Helena's	St. Helena's Anglican; see also Tabby Chapel, St. Helena Island	1724; enlarged 1817 and 1842	Anglican	Beaufort	Active
St. George's Dorchester	N/A	Ruins; built 1719–20, enlarged in the 1730s, bell tower built before 1753, burned 1781	N/A	Dorchester (originally), Summerville	Extinct
Prince George's Winyah	Prince George Winyah Parish Church	1745–55	Anglican	Georgetown	Active
St. John's Colleton	St. John's Episcopal Church	1955 (fourth on this site)	Episcopal	Johns Island	Active
Prince Frederick's	N/A	Ruins; built 1859–76, all but front wall and tower demolished 1966	N/A	Plantersville	Extinct
Prince William's	Sheldon Church	Ruins; built 1751–53, burned 1779, 1865	N/A	Sheldon/Yamasee	St. Helena's Anglican: occasional
St. Peter's	N/A	No church built	N/A	Purrysburg, Jasper County	N/A
St. Michael's	St. Michael's Church	1752–61	Anglican	Charleston (downtown)	Active
St. Stephen's	St. Stephen's Episcopal Church	1762–69	Episcopal	St. Stephen	Active
St. Mark's	St. Mark's Episcopal Church	1855 (fourth)	Episcopal	Pinewood	Active
St. Matthew's	St. Matthew's Parish Church	1852	Anglican	Fort Motte	Active
All Saints' Waccamaw	All Saints Church	1917	Anglican	Pawleys Island	Active
St. Luke's	N/A. Successor church: St. Luke's Anglican, Hilton Head Island	No church built	N/A	Hilton Head Island	Extinct
St. David's	St. David's Episcopal Church	1916; Old St. David's, 1770–73, now an event venue	Episcopal	Cheraw	Active
