= Yamacraw (disambiguation) =

The Yamacraw were a Native American tribe.

Yamacraw may also refer to:

- Yamacraw (Bahamas Parliament constituency)
- Yamacraw, Kentucky, a place in the United States
- Yamacraw, North Carolina, a place in the United States
- Yamacraw Island, South Carolina, a fictionalized Daufuskie Island in several works
- USCGC Yamacraw, two ships of the United States Coast Guard

== See also ==
- Savannah, Georgia, U.S.
- Yamacraw Bluff, Georgia, U.S.
- Yamekraw, a 1927 jazz composition inspired by a Savannah, Georgia neighborhood of the same name
