= Indian Street =

Street in Savannah, Georgia

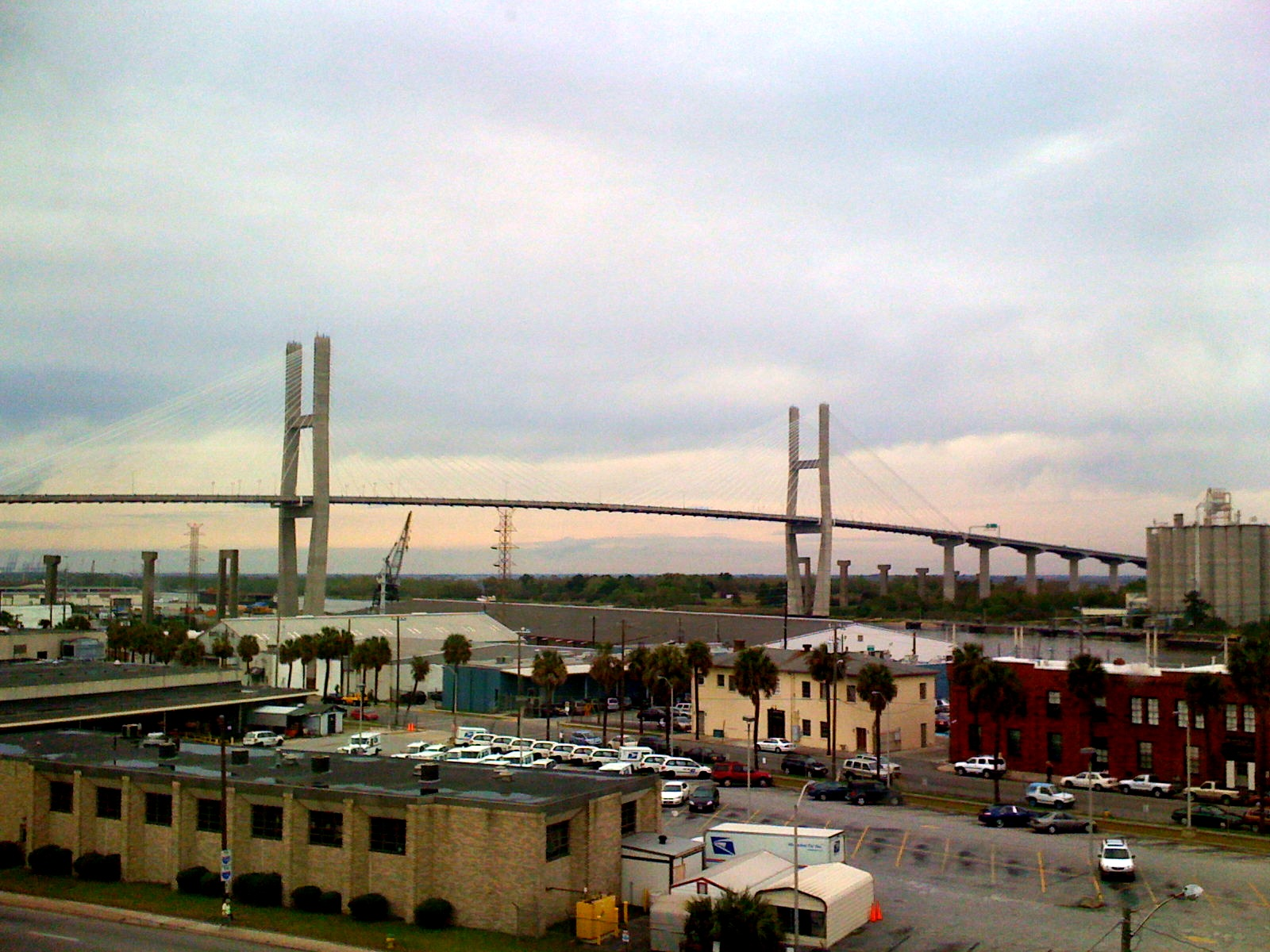
- Indian Street (foreground) and the Talmadge Memorial Bridge. The brick building at right is Savannah College of Art and Design's Hamilton Hall
- Length: 0.34 mi (0.55 km)
- Location: Savannah, Georgia, U.S.
- West end: Warner Street
- East end: Martin Luther King Jr. Boulevard

Construction
- Completion: c. 1810

Indian Street is a historic street in Savannah, Georgia, United States. It runs for about 0.34 miles (0.55 km) from Warner Street in the west to Martin Luther King Jr. Boulevard (part of State Route 25) in the east. It is immediately to the south of the Talmadge Memorial Bridge. The street is so named because it passes through Yamacraw Village, itself named for the Yamacraw Native Americans, who lived on Savannah's Yamacraw Bluff.

Running parallel to River Street, near its western terminus in the Bay Street Viaduct Area, Indian Street has historically been in a neighborhood of tradespeople important to the early formation of the city. Established in the early 19th century, by the middle of the century 81 per cent of the residential population in that area was Irish-born, and almost half of that contingent was from County Wexford, Ireland, according to a 2017 study. This included stonemason Michael Cash, who moved to Savannah from Blackwater, County Wexford, in the mid-1840s. Almost wholly responsible for the Factors Walk retaining walls, he worked out of a shop on Indian Street. Mingledorff & Co., a boiler company, was located at 510 Indian Street in 1905. In 1925, Western Electric Company, then based on West Broad Street (which became Martin Luther King Jr. Boulevard), purchased the property at 570 Indian Street, which it remodeled and fitted out for a branch of their factory and distribution works.

In 2022, Savannah College of Art and Design (SCAD) announced it was building a 17-story, 800-bed dormitory on Indian Street, to be completed by the fall of 2023. Since the location falls just outside the Savannah Historic District, the structure does not need to meet the maximum height restriction that is in place elsewhere in the downtown area. (SCAD's Hamilton Hall is located at 522 Indian Street. Together with the adjacent Adler Hall, they are known as Indian Street Studios.) It followed the similarly sized The Baxly, a mixed-use development that opened in 2020 at 630 Indian Street as one of the first multi-family residential buildings with full amenities that had been built in Savannah in sixty years.
