= Audience Given by the Trustees of Georgia to a Delegation of Creek Indians =

Painting by William Verelst

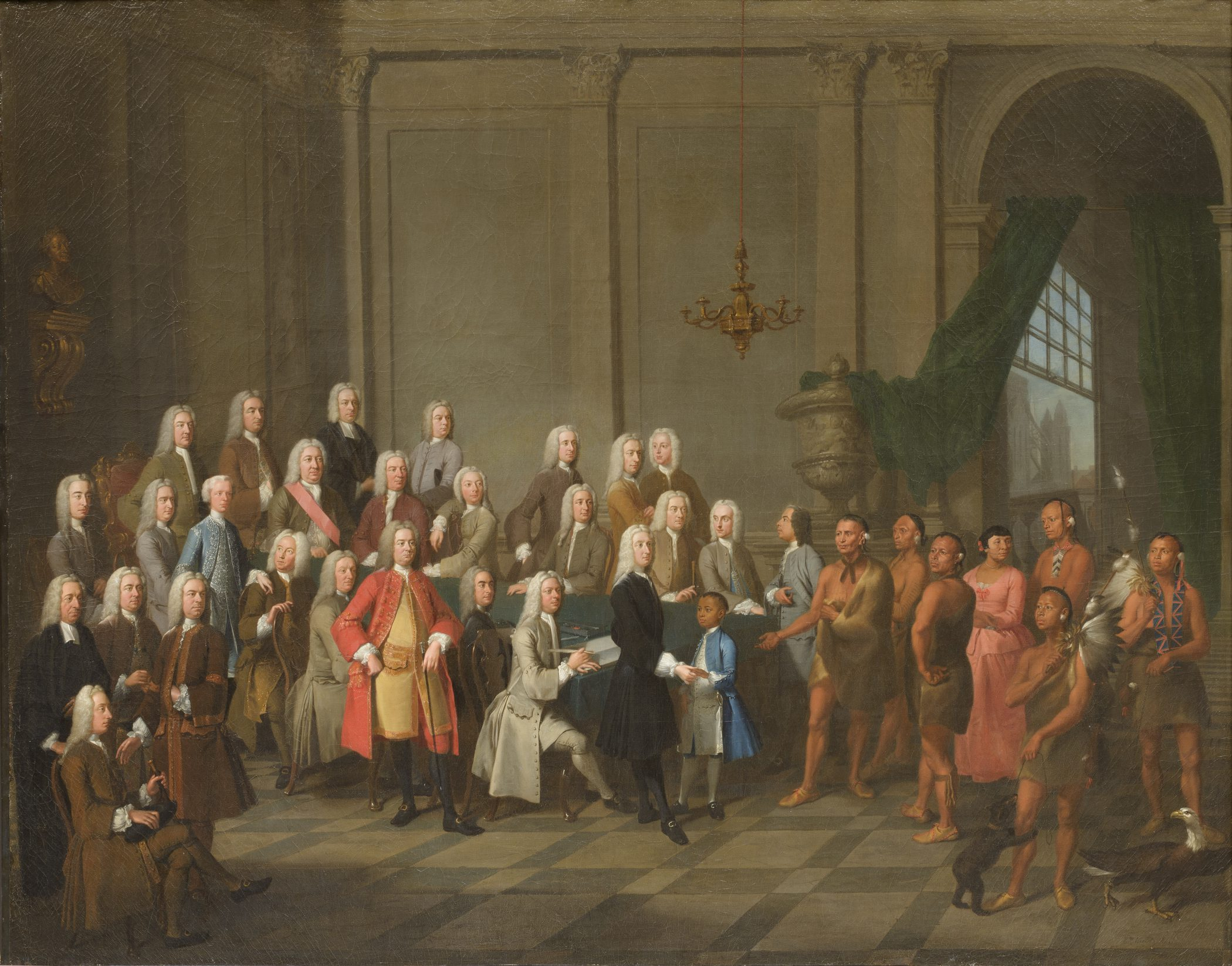
- Artist: William Verelst
- Year: c. 1734
- Medium: Oil on canvas
- Dimensions: 123.19 cm × 155.893 cm (48.50 in × 61.375 in)
- Location: Winterthur Museum, Garden and Library, Winterthur, Delaware

Audience Given by the Trustees of Georgia to a Delegation of Creek Indians is an oil-on-canvas group portrait created by English painter William Verelst (1704–1752). It was painted in London between 1734 and 1736. A bequest from Henry Francis du Pont, the painting is held in the permanent collection of the Winterthur Museum, Garden and Library. The painting depicts a Lower Creek Yamacraw delegation meeting with the governing body of the English Province of Georgia.

== Background ==
In February 1733, James Oglethorpe and a group of 114 British colonists arrived at the mouth of the Savannah River, where Tomochichi (c. 1644–1741), a Muscogee chief, had led a band of 200 Muscogee followers (that became the Yamacraw band) to settle in the late 1720s, far from their ancestral lands in the Chattahoochee River basin. Tomochichi and Oglethorpe quickly established friendly relations that culminated in a treaty of friendship and trade, enabling the British to form the new colony of Georgia. Tomochichi also played an important role in negotiating alliances between Lower Creek communities and the British.

In 1734, a Yamacraw delegation accompanied Oglethorpe to London to meet with the Trustees for the Establishment of the Colony of Georgia in America and other English dignitaries. Oglethorpe hoped that the Indians' presence would attract greater investments to the colony. During a four-month visit, the delegates met with King George II and Queen Caroline on August 1 and with Georgia's trustees on September 11 before sailing for home in late October. Verelst painted a group portrait of this meeting between the delegates and trustees. The portrait was likely painted from sketches in the months after the visit. Individual Trustees attended several sittings with Verelst while the portrait was completed. Verelst also painted a separate portrait of Tomochichi and his heir.

== Description ==
In this painting, the English trustees of Georgia Colony meet with a delegation of Creek Indians of the Yamacraw band at the trustees' headquarters in Whitehall. Twenty-four English trustees, wearing the powdered wigs and tailcoats of English gentry, gather on a slightly elevated area on the left side of the image, signifying the formality of the occasion and assumed superiority to their guests. The nine Indian delegates stand on the floor to the right and wear traditional attire of deerskin moccasins and robes, braided hair, and feathered or beaded accessories. Senauki, Tomochichi's wife and the sole woman in the group, wears a pink English-style jacket and petticoats. A black bear cub and a bald eagle are intended as gifts from the Indians that also signify their perceived quality of wildness. Tomochichi, his robe draped over one shoulder, extends an open hand, palm upward, signifying frankness and amity.

The youth with dark skin, positioned near the center of the painting and clasping the hand of one of the English trustees, is dressed in English formal wear. Mistaken as a "black attendant" by at least one scholar, he is Tooanahowi, the fifteen-year-old heir-designate of Tomochichi. Contemporaries described Tooanahowi as the chief's nephew, but he was actually Senauki's grandson (traditional Creek society was matrilineal). The youth received English schooling, delivered speeches in English during the expedition, and later fought alongside the British in the War of Jenkins' Ear.

The scene is set inside a Late Baroque building with high stone walls, marble-tiled floor, heavy draperies, and brass chandelier with a window giving a view of Westminster Abbey.

== Analysis ==
The painting is also known as the Common Council of Georgia receiving the Indian Chiefs. Commissioned by Georgia's trustees, it hung in the trustees' offices in London until the trustees dissolved after Georgia became a royal colony in 1752. Anthony Ashley Cooper, 4th Earl of Shaftesbury, acquired the portrait, which stayed in the Cooper family until it was purchased by Henry Francis du Pont circa 1930. The ninth earl presented a copy, painted by Edmund Dyer in 1826, to the State of Georgia in 1926.

The painting inspired the design of a towering and nearly nude statue of Tomochichi erected in Atlanta in 2022. Historians and members of the Muscogee Nation criticized the statue as historically inaccurate and its source material as "propaganda" intended to portray Native Americans as "weak and uncivilized."
