= John Vanderpool =

South Carolina state legislator

John Vanderpool was an American barber, laborer, and state legislator in South Carolina. He represented Charleston County, South Carolina in the South Carolina House of Representatives from 1872 to 1877.

He was part of a group of people authorized by South Carolina's general assembly to establish a wharf at Cainhoy on the Wando River.

He was also one of the incorporators of Toglio Ferry Company from Charleston to islands nearby.

== See also ==
- African American officeholders from the end of the Civil War until before 1900
