= Mary Musgrove =

American colonist

Coosaponakeesa
- Born: c. 1700; Coweta, Creek Nation (near present-day Macon, Georgia)
- Died: 1765
- Spouses: John Musgrove; Jacob Matthews; Reverend Thomas Bosomworth

Mary Musgrove (Muscogee name, Coosaponakeesa, c. 1700–1765) was a leading figure in the early history of colonial Georgia. She was the daughter of Edward Griffin, an English-born trader from Charles Town in the Province of Carolina, and a Muscogee Creek mother. Fluent in local Creek languages, as well as English, Mary became an important intermediary between Muscogee Creek Natives and the early colonists. Musgrove carved out a life that merged both cultures, making a significant contribution to the development of colonial Georgia.

== Early life ==
Mary Musgrove was born in the Creek Indian "Wind Clan" with the Creek name Coosaponakeesa in Coweta Town along the Ockmulgee River. She was the daughter of a Creek Native American woman and Edward Griffin, a trader from Charles Town in the Province of Carolina, of English descent. Her mother died when Mary was three years old and, soon after, she was taken into the custody of her grandmother. She later became known by her Christian and married names, Mary Griffin Musgrove Matthews Bosomworth.

Coweta was connected by a trading path to the Upper Creek town of Tuckabatchee. It is likely that Coosaponakeesa's family traveled, traded, and lived in both towns and had kin in each town, which may account for some historians considering her a Tuckabatchee Creek. Coosaponakeesa stated she was born in Coweta and lived with the Creeks until the age of seven when she, "was brought Down by her Father from the Indian Nation to Pomponne in South Carolina; There baptized, Educated and bred up in the principles of Christianity." After being baptized, her Christian name became Mary. Mary continued to live in Pon Pon until the Yamasee War of 1715 broke out. She then returned to Coweta and her Creek family there.

Colonel John Musgrove Sr. was a South Carolina Soldier, trader, and planter. He was employed by the Carolina Assembly to arrange peace between the Creeks and the Carolina colonists. Accompanying him to Coweta was his teenage son, John Musgrove Jr. Musgrove's party was welcomed in Coweta by "Chieftainess Qua", whom most historians have argued was the elder sister of Brims (Mary's aunt), if not her mother. Col. John Musgrove met with the Coweta headman Brims, whom the colonists had earlier designated as "Emperor" so (that in their eyes, at least) Brims could speak for the other Chiefs or headmen. In talks with Brims, it was decided a young niece from Brims' family would be betrothed to Musgrove's son, so as to maintain the native rules of kinship and reciprocity and thus help reinforce the peace treaty. Colonel Musgrove was married to a Creek woman and, therefore, his son John Musgrove Jr., like Mary, was of "mixed blood."

Mary and John Musgrove Jr., married and lived among her Coweta kin, which was the traditional practice of matrilineal cultures such as the Creeks. But in 1725, the couple moved to Pon Pon, an area now in Colleton County where Mary's father also had lived and where Mary lived for a period as a girl. By the 1730s, they had three sons, but none of their children lived to adulthood. In 1732, the couple were asked by the Carolina governor and the Yamacraws, a group of Creeks and Yamasees, to start a trading post near the Savannah River. Their trading post, Cowpen] , was well established by the time James Oglethorpe (1696–1785) and his colonists landed near Georgia.

== Cultural mediator ==
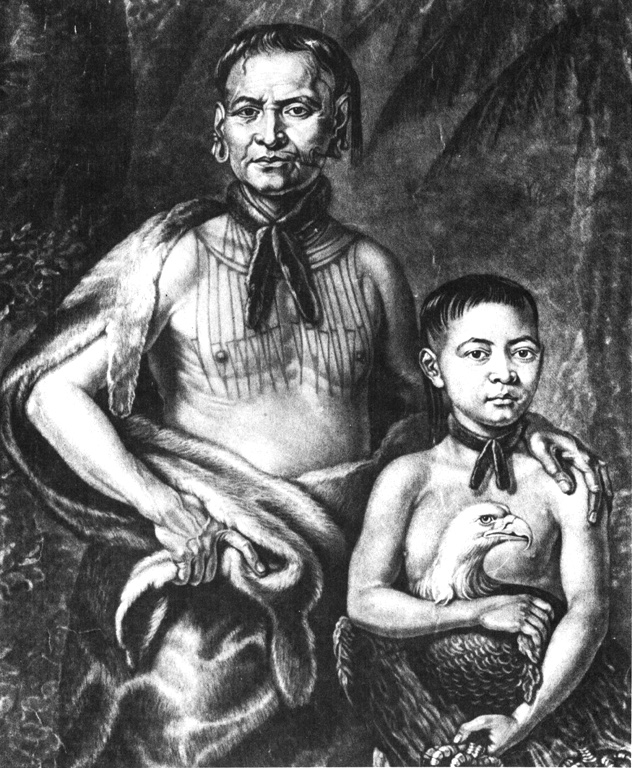
Tomochichi, chief of the Yamacraw

James Oglethorpe and a group of trustees had been granted a Royal charter by King George II (r. 1727–1760) to start a settlement colony in Georgia. Oglethorpe, a pastor, a physician and 114 colonists arrived in Charles Town in January 1733 before embarking south to ascertain a suitable site. Oglethorpe met the chief of the Yamacraws, Tomochichi (d. 1741) on February 1, 1733, and after several weeks of ritual kinship building on Tomochichi's part and Oglethorpe's responsive acts of reciprocity, quasi-kinship ties were established. Tomochichi granted land to Oglethorpe which violated previous Creek Treaties with South Carolina that prohibited colonial settlement south of the Savannah River. A three-day conference was held which resulted in the Articles of Peace and Commerce allowing Oglethorpe to settle "upon the river Savannah as far as the tide flowed and along the Sea Coast, excepting the three Islands, Sapalo [Sapelo], St. Catherine's and Ossabaw."

John Musgrove traveled as the interpreter for Tomochichi, his wife, and other Creeks who sailed with Oglethorpe to England to meet King George II in 1734. During this time the Musgrove's trading partner, Joseph Watson, drank heavily and caused extensive problems in the trading post; bragging that he helped an Indian drink himself to death, slandered Mary as a witch, tried to shoot her, and caused a sequence of events where Musgrove's slave Justice was killed. Mary filed actions against Watson, who was fined, but in the end he had to be jailed for his own protection.

On June 12, 1735, John Musgrove died of a fever. Mary married her former English indentured servant Jacob Matthews who was several years her junior in the spring of 1737. Between 1737 and 1738 Mary assisted Oglethorpe in securing land cessions from the Creeks. Under his request she established trading posts along the Altamaha so as to monitor Creek loyalty and Spanish activities. Both trading posts had to be eventually abandoned causing financial losses for Mary. For a decade Mary continued to be interpreter, mediator, and advisor to Oglethorpe helping him to secure treaties and land cessions. The minister John Wesley (1703–1791) also visited her and commented that "Tomochichi's interpreter was one Mrs. Musgrove. She understands both languages, being educated amongst the colonists. She can read and write, and is a well-civilized women. She is likewise to teach us the Indian tongue."

Mary became a widow once more in 1742. The next year Oglethorpe left for London and never returned to Georgia, leaving Mary £100, an unfulfilled promise of £100 a year, and the diamond ring from his finger. Though Oglethorpe had relied on Mary as an important intercessor who entertained important leaders and helped keep Creeks aligned with British interests, the remaining trustees and leaders did not.

== Later years ==
Mary Musgrove Matthews met the Reverend Thomas Bosomworth and they were married in July 1744. Bosomworth ignored his ministerial duties and concentrated on helping Mary with her many enterprises. Several years earlier, in 1738, Oglethorpe had met with Lower Creek town leaders. Mary had also attended as his interpreter, but she was also there as recipient of lands from the Yamacraws. The bestowing of Indian lands to Mary in the presence of Oglethorpe implied the endorsement of the colonists by default, and created a series of legal battles that would last for twenty years. Bosomworth now attempted to help his wife in securing a title to the land. While waiting for a response to their case Mary sent a memorial to Lieutenant Colonel Alexander Heron in Georgia requesting compensation for her past contributions to the Georgian colony and his Majesty's subjects. Colonel Heron also noted that he "had personal knowledge of her merit since my first arrival in this country, and I am highly sensible of the singular service she has done the country (a great part of the expense of her own private fortune) in continuing the Creek Indians in friendship and alliance with the English." While waiting on her replies from London, Mary received from Brims' successor, Malatchi, the three islands of St. Catherine, Sapelo, and Ossabaw. On St. Catherines Island she had moved cattle and started plowing fields and constructing buildings. After many memorials and petitions, Mary chose to invite Creek headmen to Savannah to collect their gifts and help convince the colonists to recognize her Creek land grants.

Malatchi and others arrived in the summer of 1749, but Mary was ignored as a translator and had to wait outside of the conference. After several hours, an angry and humiliated Mary interrupted the meeting and started to give her speech before the male assembly. One white eyewitness scorned her actions:

[She] rushed into the Room, in the most violent and outrageous manner, that a Woman spirited up with Liquor, Drunk with passion, and disappointed in her Views could be guilty of ... declared, She was Empress of the Upper and Lower Creeks, Yea, went so far in her imaginary Sovereignty, as to call herself King, and that she should command every Man in these Nations to follow her, and We should soon know it our cost.

Her angry outburst outraged the colonial magistrates, who then arrested her. Thomas Bosomworth had to publicly apologize for her and promise no future outbursts. Mary's behavior also estranged her from her male kin, and she spent the next year in the Creek Nation trying to restore her standing. By 1752, the Bosomworths were in Charles Town waiting to sail to England to plead their case in person. They were delayed for two years as they assisted the South Carolina governor in establishing peace between the Creek and the Cherokee. After a year in England, the Bosomworths came back to Savannah emptyhanded. With the arrival of Henry Ellis, the new governor of Georgia, in 1757, the problem was begrudgingly settled. Mary and Thomas were given title to St. Catherines Island and gave up the other two islands and the Yamacraw lands, which were to be sold and the proceeds given to Mary for her past salary and losses. The matter was finally resolved in 1759 with Mary's acceptance of £2100.00. Governor Ellis utilized Mary's talents as representative, interpreter and mediator a few last times before she settled quietly on St. Catherines. Mary Musgrove Matthews Bosomworth died in the summer of 1765.

== Lower Creek people ==
Creek is a name that the Muskogee people were known by amongst European settlers. Those living along the Tallapoosa and connecting rivers became known as the Upper Creeks, while those along the Chattahoochee River and to the east became known as the Lower Creeks. Mary Musgrove was a Lower Creek who stated she was born along the Oakmulgee (Ocmulgee) River.

Creek society was matrilineal; therefore a person's status and identity were determined through their mother. Fathers were not considered blood relatives, but only related by marriage. Both males and females traced their ancestral lineage through their mother and social connections were based on matrilineal kinships. Several matrilineal kinship groups claimed the same mythical ancestor thus forming a clan, such as the Wind, Bear, or Turtle clans. The Creeks consisted of many clans and there were over thirty to forty different known clans to have existed within the Creek nation. The Creeks, like many kinship-based societies, did not know how to behave or respond to people who were not connected by lines of kinship. Therefore, Creeks created kinship ties by adoption or marriage, but also through rituals fashioned to signify simulated kinship relationships. Mary Musgrove's first marriage was one such example of using marriage to create kinship ties with whites. Tomochichi's initial encounters with James Oglethorpe were designed to create fictitious lines of kinship to facilitate reciprocity.

Creek women could own land and possessions separate from their husbands. Mothers had control over their children and supervised their upbringing. Benjamin Hawkins, an Indian agent, felt "that a white man by marrying an Indian woman of the Creek nation so far from bettering his condition becomes a slave of her family." A more sympathetic onlooker was the naturalist William Bartram who noted that "the traders are fully sensible how greatly it is to their advantage to gain their [Creek women's] affections and friendship in matters of trade and commerce." White traders married Creek women to gain kinship ties and these mixed marriages produced children that technically spanned two cultures. Coosaponakeesa was one of these children.

== "Half breed" ==
The derogatory term "half breed" was coined by Europeans. Creeks did not see those children from mixed marriages or relationships as white or "mixed blood" but as nothing less than a full Creek. Those with Creek mothers meant they were Creek and had full rights as any clan member. Even white women who had been captives and then were adopted into a clan had full rights of any Creek. When they married Creek men their children also were considered entirely Creek, not necessarily because of their father, but because their white mother was considered a full Creek when she was adopted into a clan.

The only blood relatives in Creek society were that of the mother; fathers were not considered to be a blood relation but only related by marriage and the rules of kinship. Therefore, a child's closest and most important male relatives were their maternal uncles. Which was why Brims arranged the marriage of his niece and she referred to him in her demand to be recognized as an important Creek woman. "Mixed blood" Indians in white society and culture were considered important intermediates in the early development of European goals of colonization, trade, and land acquisition, but they were still not considered white and therefore maintained marginal status in the white world. "Mixed blood" children bridged two cultures, but because of the matrilineal customs there was no marginal status in Creek society for women like Mary Musgrove and others in the Muskogee world.

== Timeline ==
- c.1700 – Coosaponakeesa (later Mary Musgrove) born in Coweta, Creek Nation (now near Newnan, Georgia, USA).
- c.1703 – Mary's mother dies. She then is raised by her maternal grandmother in the Creek Nation.
- c.1707 – Mary's father, Edward Griffin, takes her to Pon Pon, SC, (now Colleton County, SC) to live. She is baptized as Mary Griffin.
- 1715 – The Yamasee War breaks out. Coosaponakeesa/Mary moves back to her Creek family in Coweta.
- c.1716 – Mary and John Musgrove Jr. meet in Coweta and subsequently marry.
- 1732 – John and Mary Musgrove establish a prosperous trading post, Cowpen, near present-day Savannah, GA.
- 1733 – General James Oglethorpe arrives in search of area to settle.
- 1733 – Oglethorpe hires Mary as intermediary / interpreter for negotiations with Indians.
- 1735 – John Musgrove dies of fever.
- 1737 – Mary marries Jacob Matthews.
- 1738 – Mary receives land from the Yamacraws.
- 1742 – Jacob Matthews dies.
- 1743 – Oglethorpe leaves Georgia and returns to England.
- 1744 – Mary marries Reverend Thomas Bosomworth.
- 1747 – Mary receives grant of St. Catherine, Sapelo, and Ossabaw Islands from the Creeks.
- 1760 – Mary settles back-pay claims and secures clear title to St. Catherine's Island from the British courts.
- 1765 – Mary dies in her sleep on St. Catherine's Island, She was 65 years old.

== See also ==
- Savannah Women of Vision
- Creek language
- Creek mythology
- Creek people
- History of Savannah, Georgia
- Savannah Belles Ferry
