= Yamacraw Bluff =

Cliff in Savannah, Georgia, United States

- Bluff
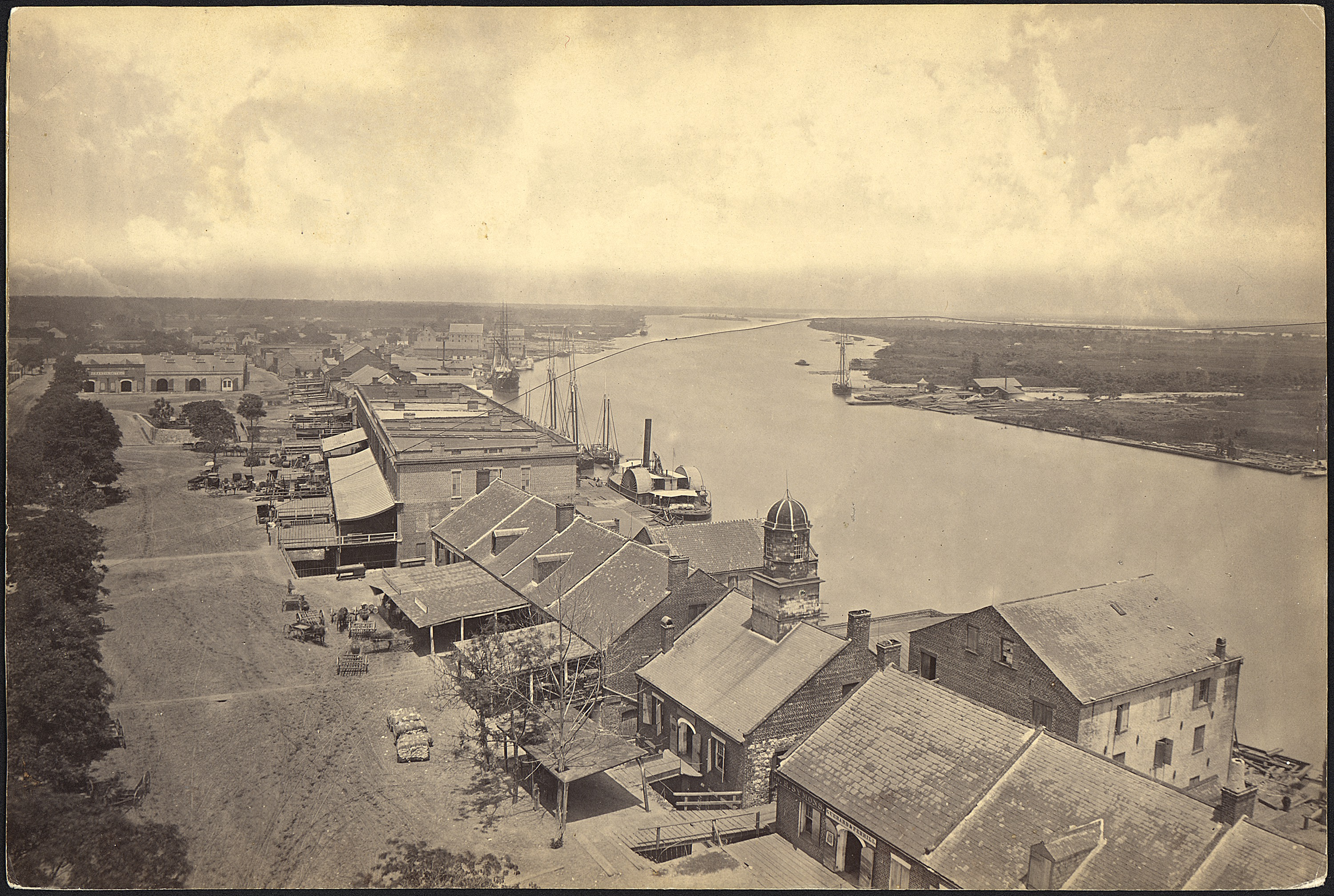
- Businesses on the bluff in the mid 19th century, looking northwest along the Savannah River

- Location within Georgia
- Coordinates: 32.081111°N 81.088611°W
- Location: Savannah, Georgia, U.S.

Yamacraw Bluff is a bluff situated on the southern bank of the Savannah River. Now completely enclosed within downtown Savannah, Georgia, the bluff is most notable for being the site upon which General James Oglethorpe arrived to settle the British colony of Georgia. The area was originally inhabited by the Yamacraw Indians. A stone marker and statue now adorn the bluff in honor of its historic significance.

== History ==
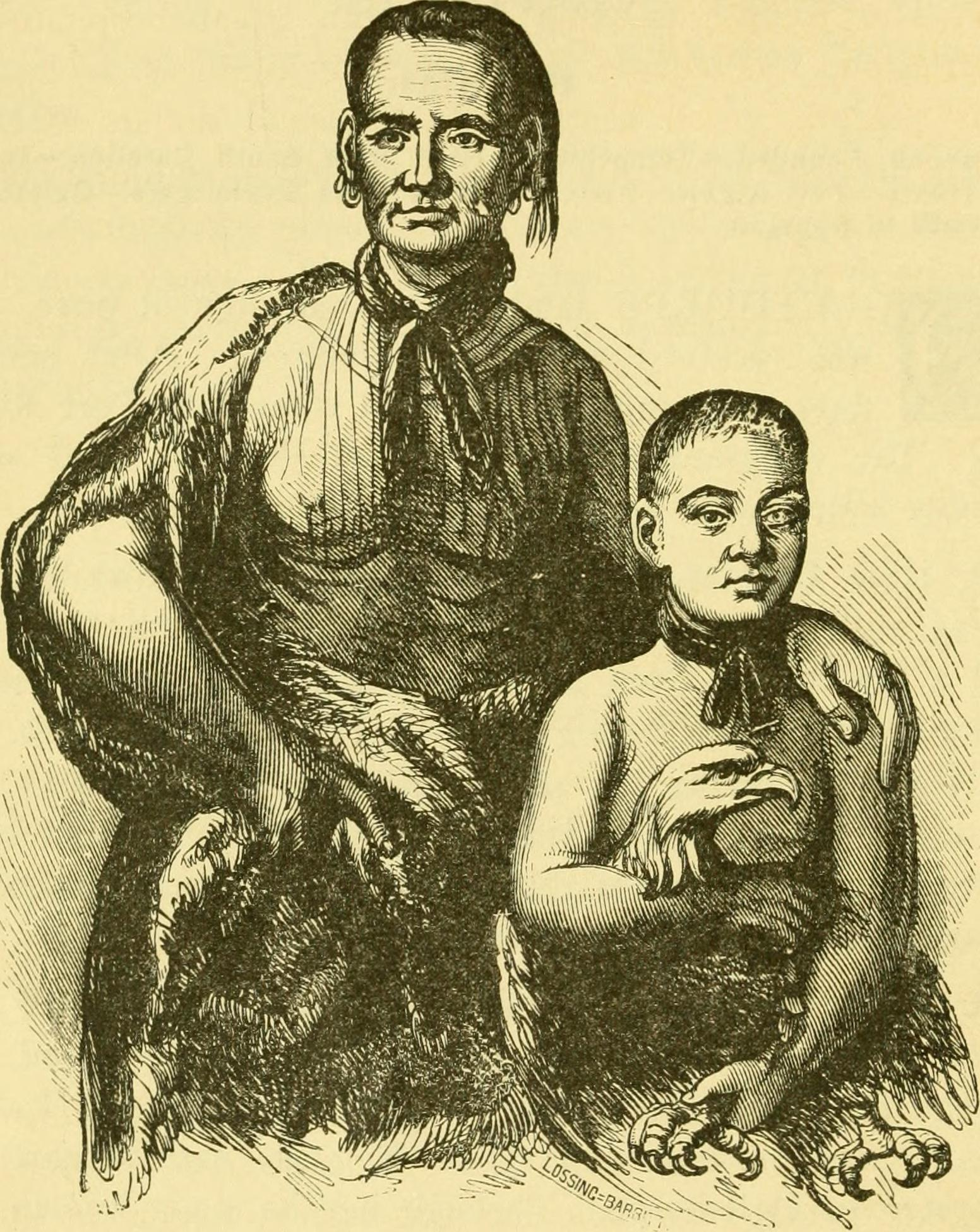
Tomochichi and his nephew, Toonahawi

Yamacraw Bluff was first inhabited around 1730 by a group of Creek Indians who named themselves after the bluff. Their chief, Tomochichi, was also the founder of the tribe. In 1733, General James Oglethorpe and 114 colonists landed on the bluff. The general went on to found the town of Savannah with the help of the chief and a local interpreter, Mary Musgrove. The Native Yamacraws eventually left the bluff to merge with a larger inland tribe, having occupied the bluff for less than two decades.

== Monuments and markers ==
In anticipation of the 1933 bicentennial celebration of Georgia's founding, a stone marker was laid on Bay Street in a small park just west of Savannah City Hall. The marker, erected in 1930, reads:

This is Yamacraw Bluff where the Colony of Georgia was founded, February 12, 1733, by Gen. James Edward Oglethorpe Voted by the Georgia Daughters of the American Revolution The Most Historic Spot in Georgia.

== See also ==
- Indian Street
