= Michael Cash =

Michael Cash may refer to:

- Michael Cash (swimmer)
- Michael Cash (stonemason)
