= Summer Chapel, Prince Frederick's Episcopal Church =

- U.S. National Register of Historic Places
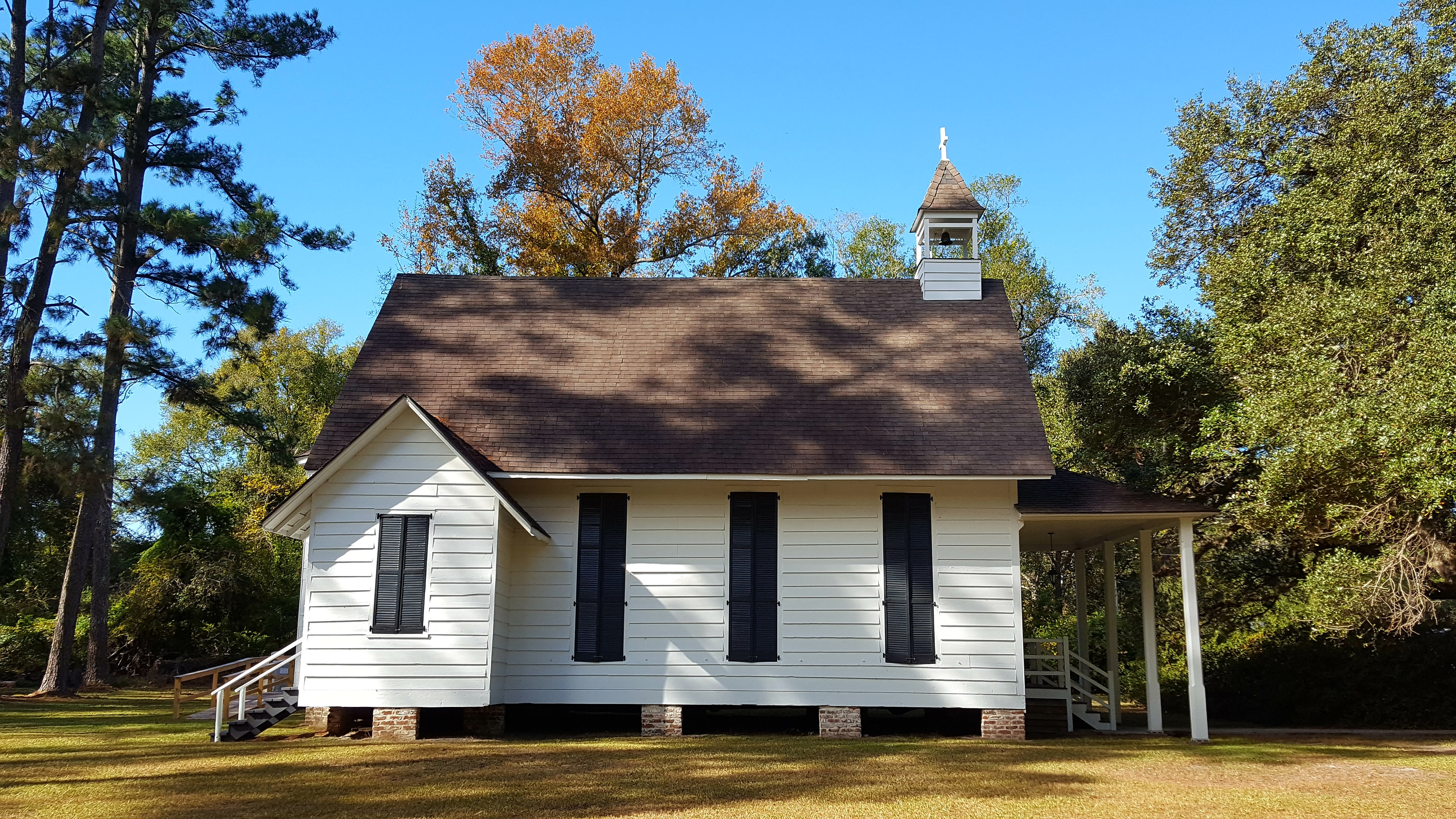

- Location within South Carolina Location within the United States
- Location: CR 52, Plantersville, South Carolina
- Coordinates: 33°33′17″N 79°12′42″W
- Area: 1.5 acres (0.61 ha)
- Built: c. 1836, 1877
- MPS: Georgetown County Rice Culture MPS
- NRHP reference No.: 88000535
- Added to NRHP: October 03, 1988

Summer Chapel, Prince Frederick's Episcopal Church is a historic Episcopal chapel associated with Prince Frederick's Episcopal Church and located on CR 52 in Plantersville, Georgetown County, South Carolina. It was finished by 1836, and is a one-story, frame chapel with clapboard exterior walls and standing seam metal gable roof. The entrance is sheltered by a hipped roof porch. In 1877 it was moved to Plantersville, to replace the summer chapel there, along with the Summer Chapel Rectory, Prince Frederick's Episcopal Church.

It was listed on the National Register of Historic Places in 1988.
