= Summer Chapel Rectory, Prince Frederick's Episcopal Church =

- U.S. National Register of Historic Places
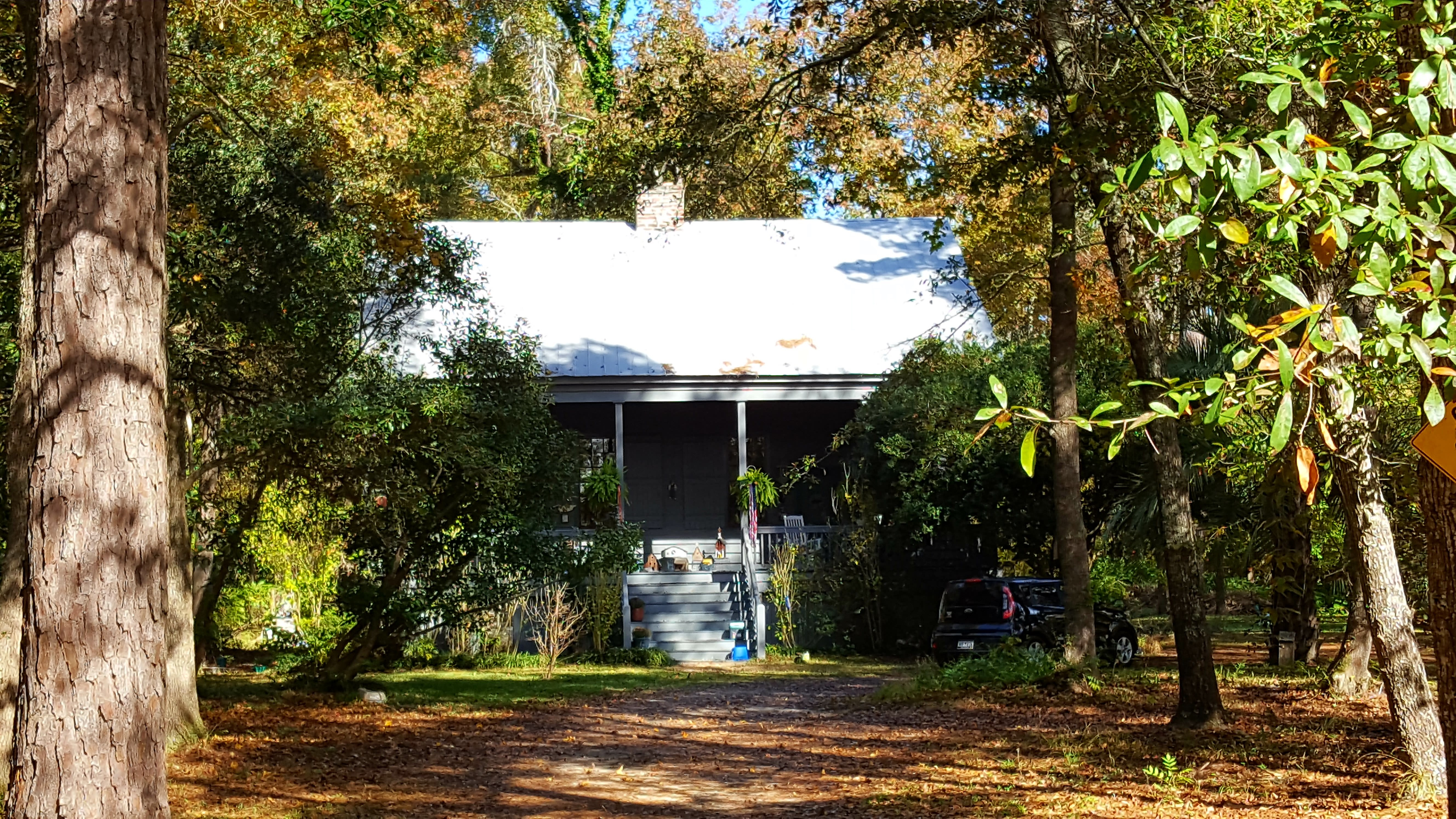

- Location within South Carolina Location within the United States
- Location: CR 52, Plantersville, South Carolina
- Coordinates: 33°33′18″N 79°12′53″W
- Area: 3.9 acres (1.6 ha)
- Built: c. 1850, 1877
- MPS: Georgetown County Rice Culture MPS
- NRHP reference No.: 88000536
- Added to NRHP: October 03, 1988

Summer Chapel Rectory, Prince Frederick's Episcopal Church is a historic rectory associated with Prince Frederick's Episcopal Church on CR 52 near Plantersville, Georgetown County, South Carolina. It was built about 1850, and is a 1 1/2-story, U-shaped frame building with a clapboard exterior on a raised brick foundation. It has a standing seam metal gable roof and a one-story engaged porch extends across the façade. The rectory was moved to its present location in 1877 after the original chapel was abandoned and served as the rectory for Summer Chapel, Prince Frederick's Episcopal Church.

It was listed on the National Register of Historic Places in 1988.
