= Statue of Tomochichi =

- Statue of Tomochichi (2023)
- Location: Atlanta, Georgia, United States
- Dedicated date: 2021
- Dedicated to: Tomochichi

A 20-foot (6.1 m) statue of Tomochichi was temporarily installed outside the Millennium Gate Museum in Atlanta, Georgia, in 2021. There are plans to relocate the artwork to Rodney Cook Sr. Park in Vine City.

== See also ==
- History of Atlanta
