= White Church, Cainhoy =

Historic church in South Carolina, United States

- White Church
- U.S. National Register of Historic Places
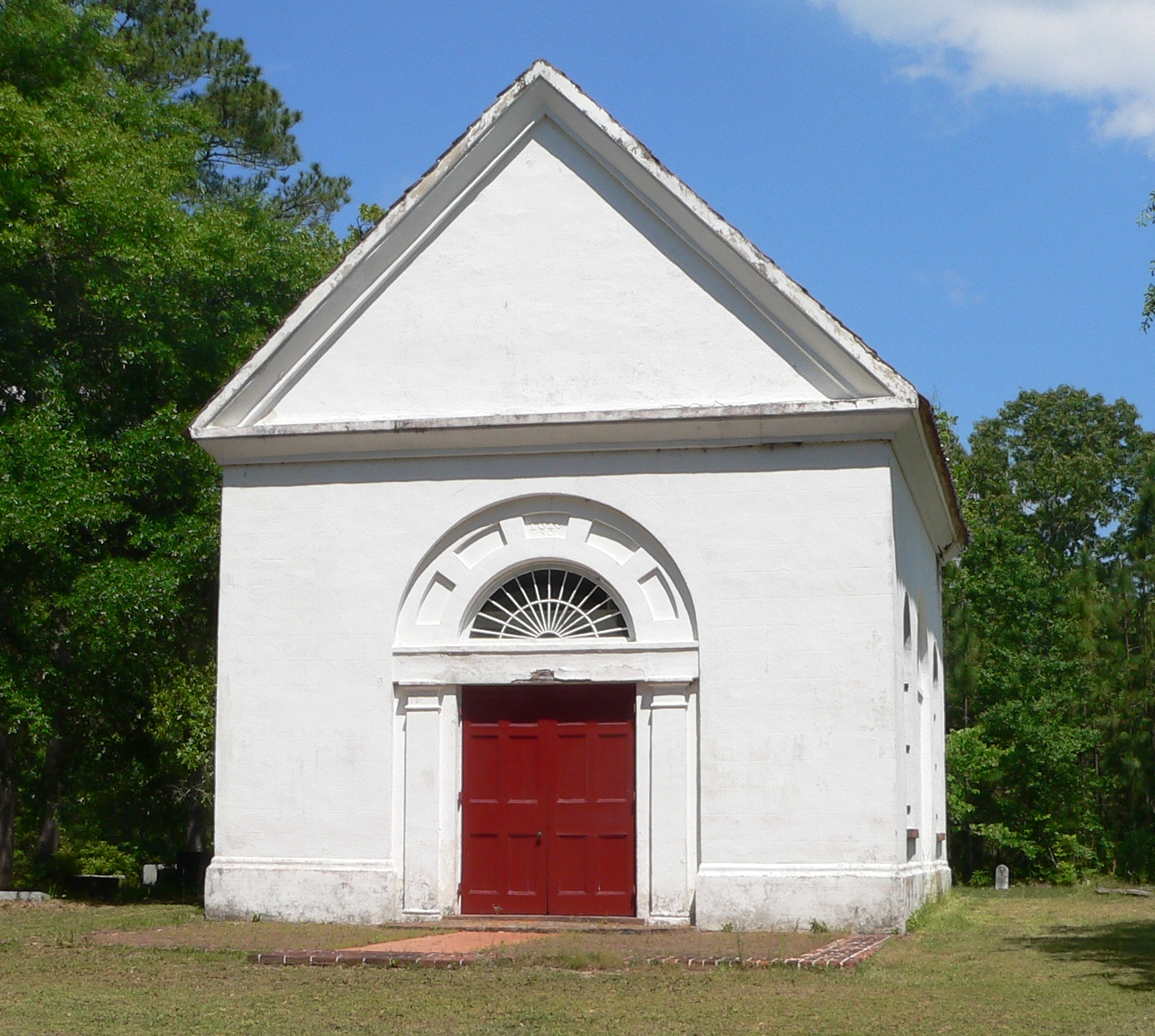

- Location within South Carolina Location within the United States
- Nearest city: Cainhoy, South Carolina
- Coordinates: 32°57′37″N 79°51′29″W
- Area: 1 acre (0.40 ha)
- Built: 1819
- NRHP reference No.: 72001193
- Added to NRHP: March 23, 1972

White Church, also known as The Brick Church, and formally as St. Thomas Episcopal Church and St. Thomas and St. Dennis Parish Church, is a historic church north of Cainhoy in Berkeley County, South Carolina.

It was built in 1819 as the parish church for St. Thomas and St. Dennis Parish and added to the National Register of Historic Places in 1972, together with its vestry building and cemetery.

== Reconstruction era ==
In October 1876 the church was the site of a planned Republican meeting, attended mostly by freedmen, which was interrupted by a large party of more than 150 white men, Democrats from Charleston who arrived by steamboat and demanded equal time. As this followed the massacre by whites of seven freedmen at Hamburg in Aiken County from July 4 to July 8, tensions were high. While efforts were made to have both sides lay down their arms, the tensions broke out into shooting, which resulted in the deaths of one African-American man and three to six whites. It "represented a rare instance during Reconstruction where the African American combatants got the better of their opponents."

It was one of several events during the campaign season in South Carolina in which violence was used to disrupt Republican meetings and suppress black voting, particularly in Edgefield County, which had a Republican/black majority. Typical of the times was a plan for Edgefield County by veteran General Martin W. Gary, who listed numerous activities to take place over several months by rifle clubs to disrupt Republican voting.
