= Senauki =

18th-century Native American leader

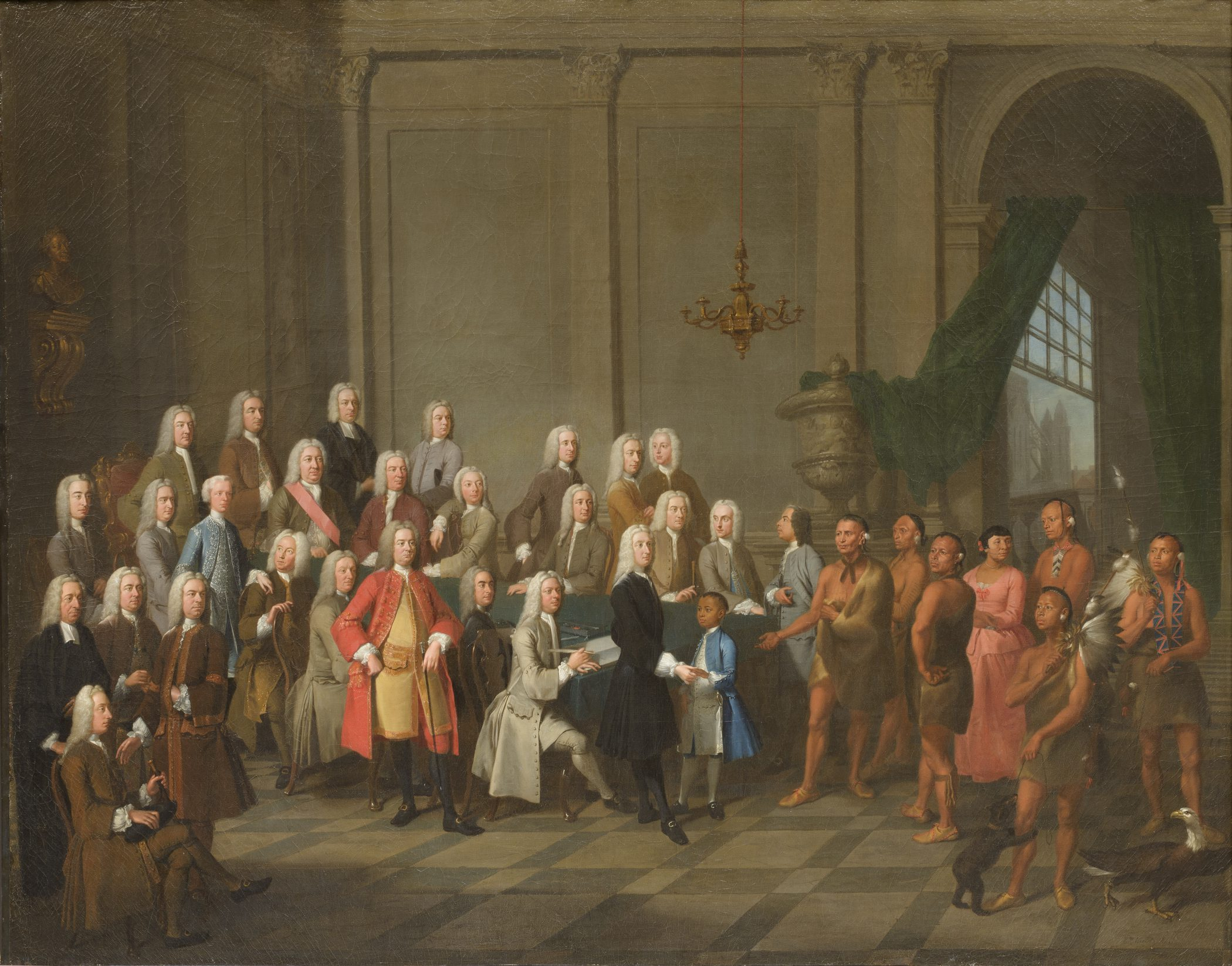
Audience Given by the Trustees of Georgia to a Delegation of Creek Indians. Senauki is on the right, wearing pink.

Senauki was a prominent Muscogee (Creek) woman in what was then the Province of Georgia in British America.

Senauki was the wife of the influential Muscogee leader Tomochichi. In 1734, Senauki traveled to London, England, as part of a Muscogee delegation. She also participated in negotiations between the Muscogee and early Georgia colonists. She is depicted in the William Verelst painting Audience Given by the Trustees of Georgia to a Delegation of Creek Indians (1734–35). Senauki on the right, wearing pink.

After Tomochichi's death on October 5, 1739, Senauki and Tomochichi's nephew Toonahowi took charge of the Muscogee tribe.

Senauki probably died in the late 1740s.
