= Pocosobo Town =

Archaeological site in South Carolina, United States

- U.S. National Register of Historic Places
- Nearest city: Sheldon, South Carolina
- Area: 14 acres (5.7 ha)
- MPS: Yamasee Indian Towns in the South Carolina Low Country MPS
- NRHP reference No.: 93001480
- Added to NRHP: January 21, 1994

Pocosobo Town, also known as The Rule Site, is a historic archaeological site located near Sheldon, Beaufort County, South Carolina. The site was occupied by the Yamasee, an Indigenous group that played a crucial role in the early colonial history of South Carolina. This site may have been occupied by the Yemasee as early as 1695, but it was definitely the location of Pocosabo Town from 1707 to 1715.

It was listed in the National Register of Historic Places in 1994.
