= John Bartlam =

British potter (1735-1781)

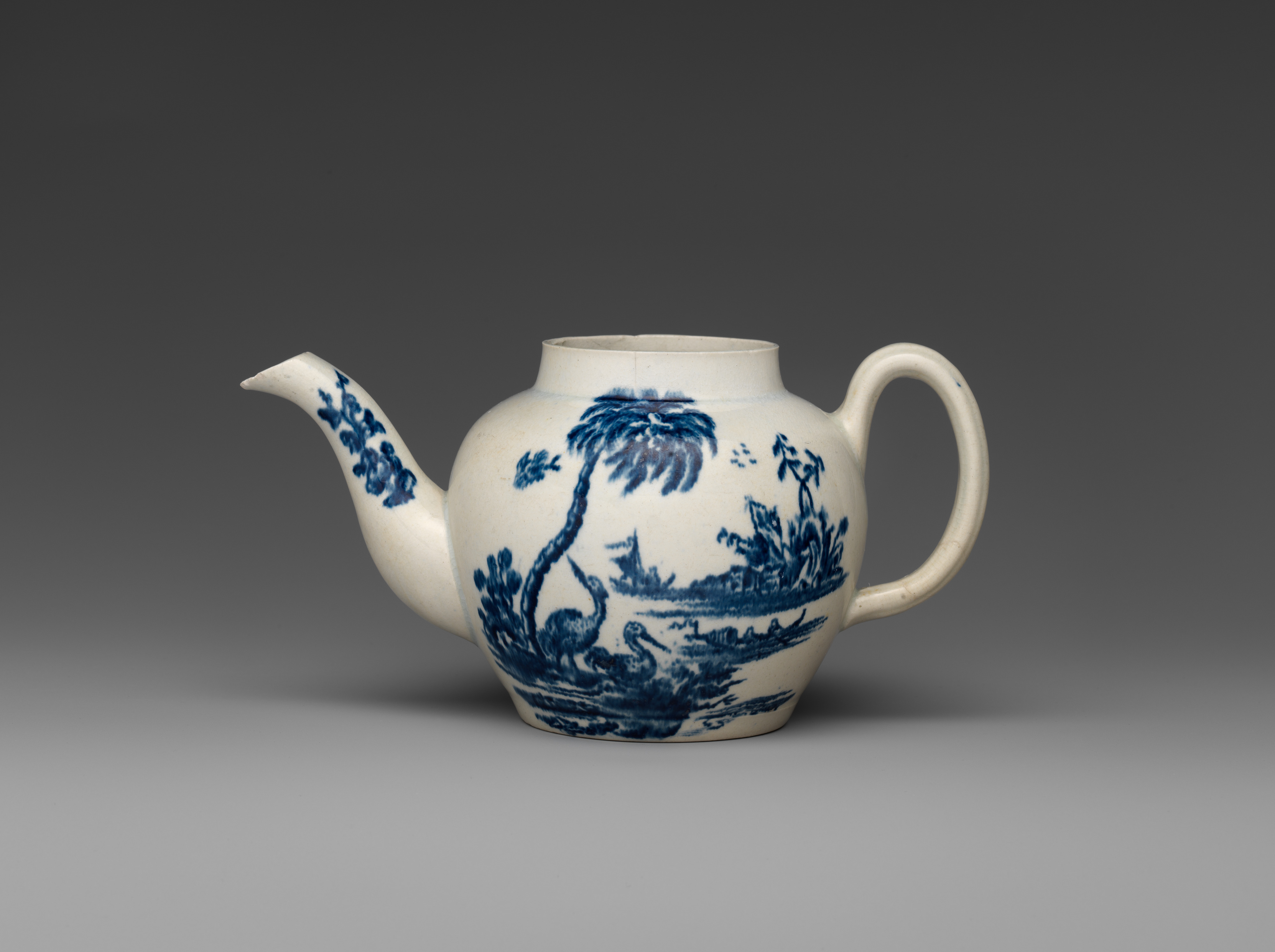
Teapot, ca. 1765–69

John Bartlam (1735–1781) was a British potter who emigrated to America in 1763, and established a factory in Cainhoy, then called Cain Hoy, nine miles north of Charleston, South Carolina before moving to Camden, South Carolina. His porcelain is the earliest ever produced on American soil.

== Early life ==
He was born in Stoke-on-Trent and worked for twelve years as a potter in Staffordshire. He married Mary Allen in 1754 and had a daughter, Honor, in 1761 and another, Betty Allen, two years later. Bartlam then emigrated in 1763.

== Porcelain from South Carolina ==
No high quality porcelain was being produced in America at the time, only basic stoneware. Luxury porcelains with underglaze blue decoration had to be exported to wealthy colonists in America from Britain. However suitable kaolin deposits had been discovered in the 1730s in the Carolinas, and some clay was even being shipped to England from Charleston. Bartlam first began his pottery enterprise in 1765 in Cain Hoy, employing African-Americans as apprentices in the business. Bartlam moved his business to Camden, South Carolina in 1772 where there were plentiful supplies of kaolin. From there he exported Queen's Ware “equal in quality and appearance and can be afforded as cheap, as any imported from England.” His products were regarded as a threat by Josiah Wedgwood.

== Allegiance in War of Independence ==
He was known to be a supporter of the British administration, but nevertheless joined the South Carolina militia in 1775. However he was reported as fighting on the British side. It is unknown if he was killed or executed, but he died in 1781. In 1783 the state declared him as a deceased deserter of the militia and confiscated £525 of property. After living in squalor, Mary moved to British Florida and tried to claim compensation from the British Government. She returned to Staffordshire with her daughters where she died in 1818.

== Valuation of Bartlam's products ==
2007 archaeologists discovered soft porcelain shards with blue and white decoration during excavations in Cainhoy. There is only speculation about the location of the Camden site. Only nine known whole examples exist of pottery produced by Bartlam in South Carolina during the late 1760s. All were discovered in Britain. The first intact Bartlam piece, a tea bowl, was found in 2010 by English porcelain specialist Roderick Jellicoe, who identified it by matching it with fragments found by the archaeologists. A further three tea bowls were then discovered in private collections. Once their manufacturer was proven, they were sold at high prices. One was bought by The Chipstone Foundation in Milwaukee and another by the Philadelphia Museum of Art for around $50,000 and $75,000 respectively. The third sold at Christie's in New York in 2013 for $120,000. A John Bartlam teapot with a broken handle and without a lid was sold at Woolley & Wallis' saleroom in Salisbury UK in 2018 for £460,000 before commission and VAT (total cost about $806,000).

== Further information ==
- YouTube video
