= Old Sheldon Church Ruins =

Historic church in South Carolina, United States

- Sheldon Church Ruins
- U.S. National Register of Historic Places
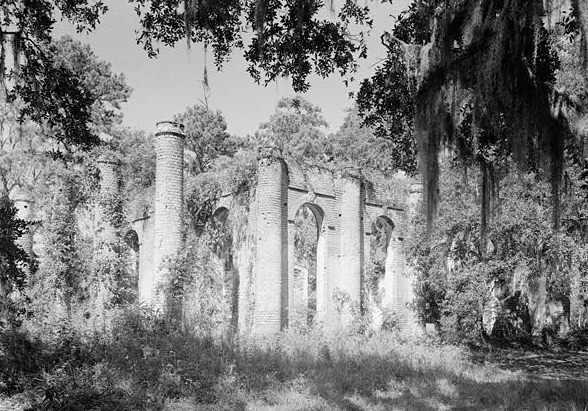
- Sheldon Church Ruins

- Location within South Carolina Location within the United States
- Location: Beaufort County, South Carolina, USA
- Nearest city: Yemassee, South Carolina
- Coordinates: 32°37′6.7″N 80°46′49.7″W
- Area: 4.5 acres (1.8 ha)
- Built: 1753
- Architectural style: Greek Revival
- NRHP reference No.: 70000562
- Added to NRHP: October 22, 1970

The Old Sheldon Church Ruins is a historic site located in northern Beaufort County, South Carolina, approximately 17 miles (30 km) north of Beaufort in the Sheldon area.

== History ==
Known also as the Sheldon Church or Old Sheldon Church, the building was originally known as Prince William's Parish Church. The church was built as a chapel of ease in the English Georgian style, using the Roman Tuscan or Doric order, between 1745 and 1753.

The traditional understanding is that Prince William's was burned by the British in 1779 during the Revolutionary War, rebuilt in 1826, and then burned again in 1865 during the Civil War by the Federal Army under General William T Sherman::

The official South Carolina report on the "Destruction of Churches and Church Property," after the War Between the States, described Sheldon's second burning: "All that was combustible was consumed ..., its massive walls survive the last as they did the former conflagration," Bishop Thomas wrote, "Exactly as it happened a hundred years before in 1779, when General Prevost, marching from Savannah into South Carolina burned the Church, so now in February 1865, General Sherman marching from Georgia into South Carolina, burned it a second time."

However, an alternative view has more recently come to light. In a letter dated February 3, 1866, Milton Leverett wrote that "Sheldon Church not burn't. Just torn up in the inside, but can be repaired." In this view, the inside of the church was apparently gutted to reuse materials to rebuild homes burnt by Sherman's army.

== Today ==
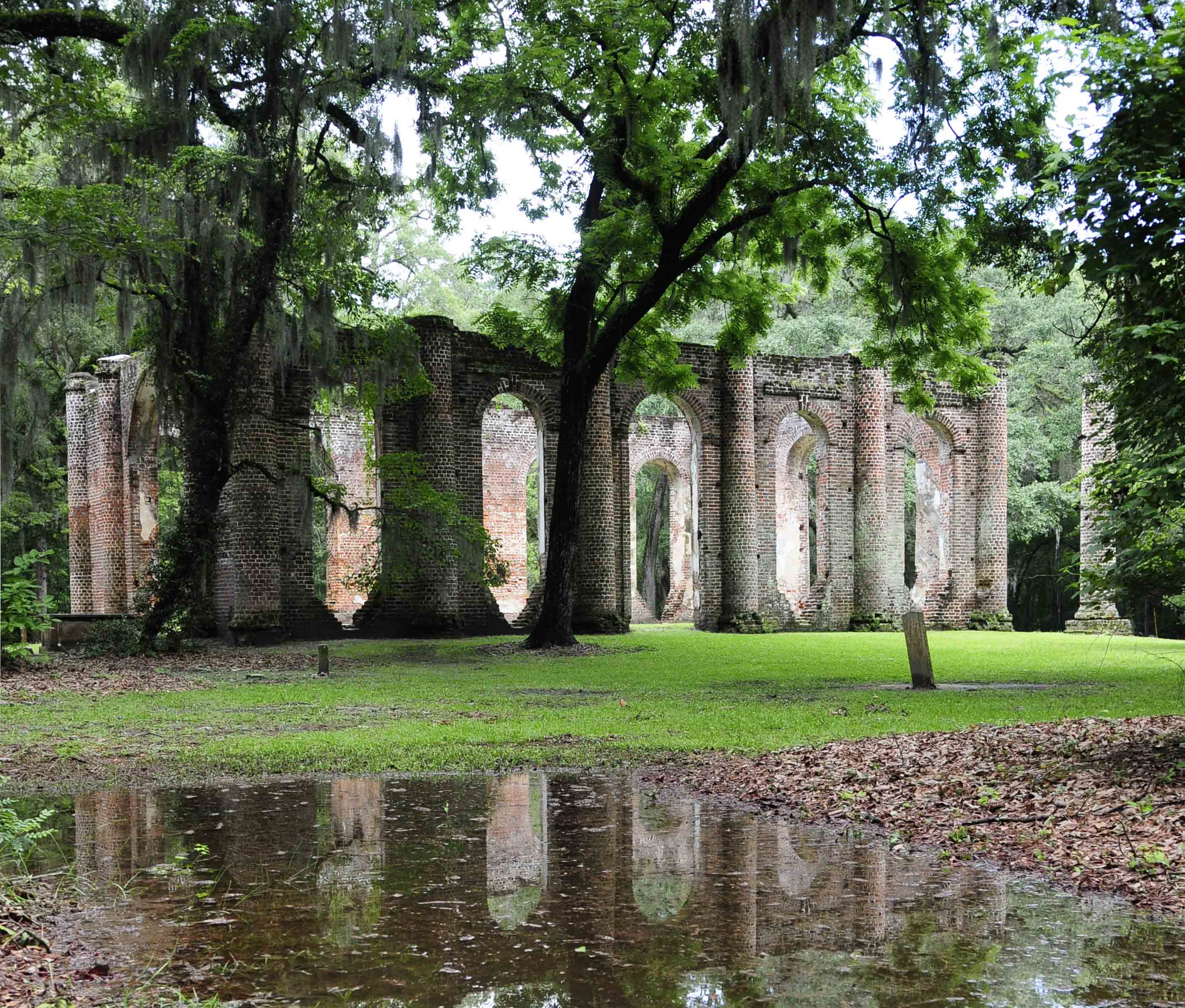
In 2012

The ruins lie among majestic oaks and scattered graves. Inside the ruins of the church lie the remains of Governor William Bull, who "greatly assisted General Oglethorpe in establishing the physical layout of Savannah, Georgia. Bull surveyed the land in 1733 to form the basic grid pattern of the streets and squares." The ruins proved to be a popular site in the Lowcountry for photographers and wedding ceremonies in contemporary times. As of October 2015, the Old Sheldon ruins are not available to the public for hosting wedding ceremonies; however, since 1925, an annual service has been held the second Sunday after Easter by clergy from the Parish Church of St. Helena in Beaufort.
