= Plantersville, South Carolina =

Coordinates: 33°33′20″N 79°12′55″W

- Unincorporated Community
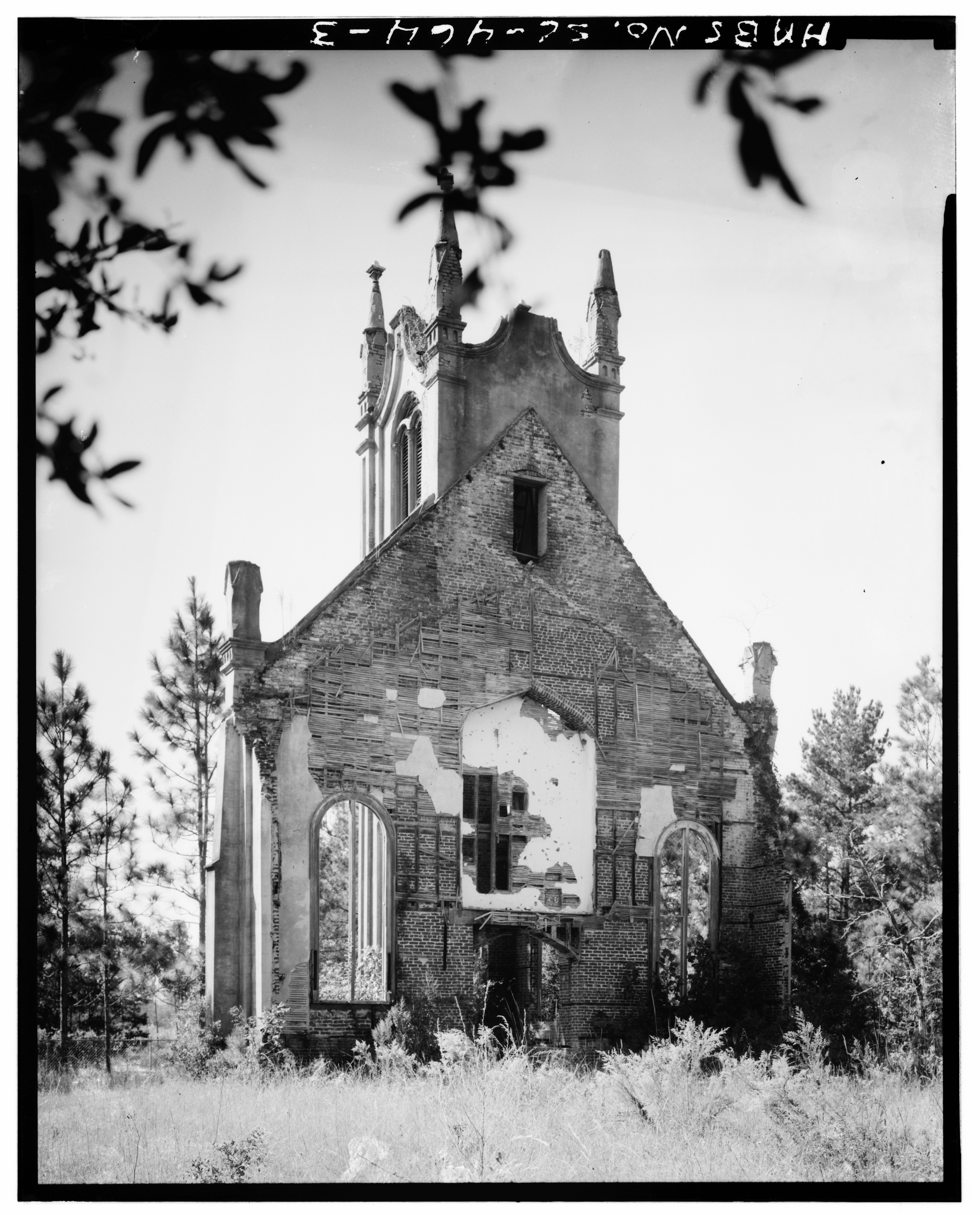
- Ruins of Prince Frederick's Capel on U.S. Route 52 in Plantersville, 1933
- Interactive map of Plantersville, South Carolina
- Country: United States
- State: South Carolina
- County: Georgetown
- Time zone: Eastern
- Area code: 843

Plantersville is an unincorporated community in Georgetown County, South Carolina, United States. The community is six miles north of Georgetown on U.S. Route 701. Plantersville is home to many plantations and rice fields. Plantersville Elementary School is also located within the community.

Prince Frederick's Chapel Ruins, Summer Chapel Rectory, Prince Frederick's Episcopal Church, and Summer Chapel, Prince Frederick's Episcopal Church are listed on the National Register of Historic Places.

== External References ==
Gullah Geechee: Descendants of slaves fight for their land https://www.bbc.co.uk/news/magazine-37994938
