= Sheldon, South Carolina =

Sheldon
- Census-designated place
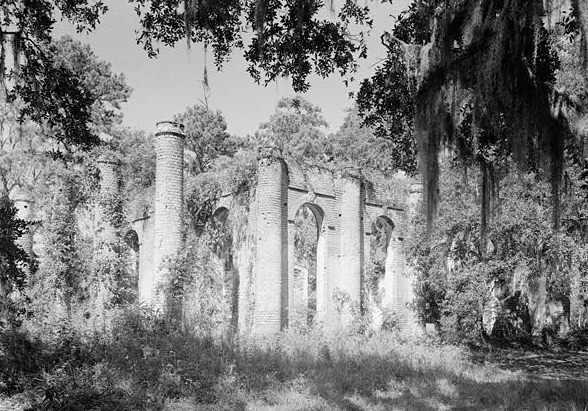
- Old Sheldon Church Ruins
- Interactive map of Sheldon
- Coordinates: 32°35′55″N 80°47′46″W
- Country: United States
- State: South Carolina
- County: Beaufort

Area
  - Total: 4.56 sq mi (11.81 km^{2})
  - Land: 4.53 sq mi (11.73 km^{2})
  - Water: 0.031 sq mi (0.08 km^{2})
- Elevation: 26 ft (7.9 m)

Population (2020)
  - Total: 579
  - Density: 127.8/sq mi (49.34/km^{2})
- Time zone: UTC-5 (Eastern (EST))
  - Summer (DST): UTC-4 (EDT)
- ZIP codes: 29941
- Area codes: 843, 854
- FIPS code: 45-65590
- GNIS feature ID: 2812936

Sheldon is an unincorporated community and census-designated place (CDP) in Beaufort County, South Carolina, United States. It was first listed as a CDP in the 2020 census with a population of 579.

A rural area in character, Sheldon was primarily a common gathering area for various plantation owners and slaves prior to the Civil War. It is renowned for the Old Sheldon Church Ruins.

The Pocosobo Town was listed on the National Register of Historic Places in 1994.

== Geography ==
Sheldon is located approximately halfway between Beaufort and Yemassee and just east of Interstate 95 in the heart of the Lowcountry region. U.S. Routes 17 and 21 run through the center of the community in a wrong-way concurrency.

== Demographics ==
Historical population
Census	Pop.	Note	%±
2020	579		—
U.S. Decennial Census; 2020

Sheldon first appeared as a census designated place in the 2020 U.S. census.

=== 2020 census ===
Sheldon CDP, South Carolina – Racial and ethnic composition Note: the US Census treats Hispanic/Latino as an ethnic category. This table excludes Latinos from the racial categories and assigns them to a separate category. Hispanics/Latinos may be of any race.
Race / Ethnicity (NH = Non-Hispanic)	Pop 2020	% 2020
White alone (NH)	153	26.42%
Black or African American alone (NH)	390	67.36%
Native American or Alaska Native alone (NH)	1	0.17%
Asian alone (NH)	2	0.35%
Pacific Islander alone (NH)	0	0.00%
Other race alone (NH)	2	0.35%
Mixed race or Multiracial (NH)	12	2.07%
Hispanic or Latino (any race)	19	3.28%
Total	579	100.00%
