= Tomochichi =

Creek chieftain (1644–1741)

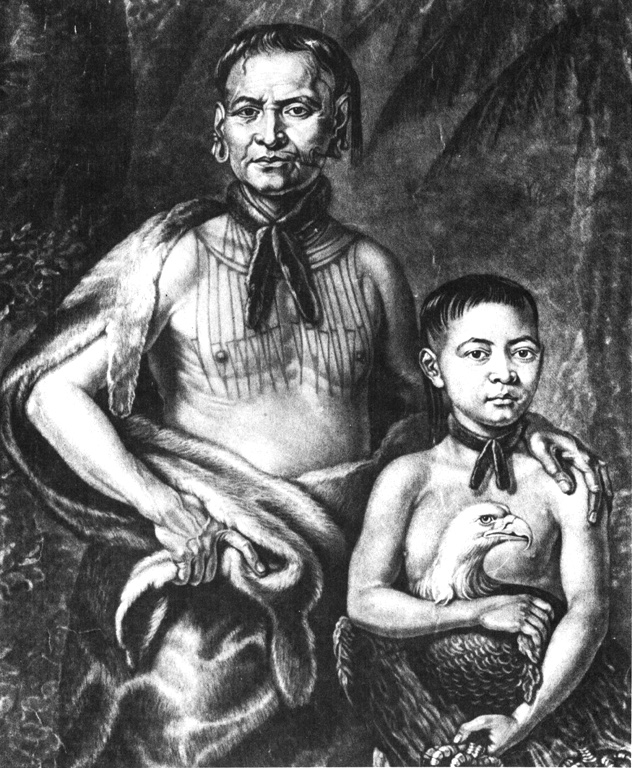
- Tomochichi and his nephew, Toonahawi
- Born: c. 1644
- Died: October 5, 1739
- Resting place: Wright Square, Savannah, Georgia, U.S.

Tomochichi (to-mo-chi-chi') (c. 1644 – October 5, 1739) was the head chief of a Yamacraw town on the site of present-day Savannah, Georgia, in the 18th century. He gave land on Yamacraw Bluff to James Oglethorpe to build the city of Savannah. He remains a prominent historical figure of early Georgia history. As the principal mediator between the native population and the new British settlers during the first years of settlement, he contributed much to the establishment of peaceful relations between the two groups and to the ultimate success of Georgia.

== Life ==
Although much of his early life is unknown, Tomochichi was exiled from the Creek nation for unclear reasons and, along with several followers, he first settled in what is now Savannah, Georgia. Presumably, he was Creek and participated in their early activities with settlers in the colony of Carolina. In about 1730 Tomochichi created his own tribe of Yamacraw from an assortment of Creek and Yamasee Indians after the two nations disagreed over future relations with the British and the Spanish. His group, approximately two hundred people, settled on the bluffs of the Savannah River because the location was the resting place of his ancestors and had close proximity to British traders. When General James Oglethorpe and his fellow settlers reached the region in February 1733, they realized the need to negotiate fairly with the neighboring Indian tribes or risk the success of their enterprise. Mary Musgrove, daughter of a Creek mother and an English father, and her husband, John, served as interpreters for the general and the chief. Tomochichi had had previous contact with British colonists, making him unafraid yet cautious. The aging warrior had several different options available, but he decided to receive the new arrivals and to give them permission to establish Savannah in order to take advantage of trading and diplomatic connections.

The colonial charter of Georgia was established in 1732 (the colonial charter was contributed in the same year), and Tomochichi remained a lifelong friend of the early British colonists, also helping the settlers in Georgia to negotiate a treaty with the Lower Creeks (as well as settling previous disagreements with the Creek).

James Oglethorpe wrote the following account in a letter dated June 9, 1737:

"There seems a Door opened to our Colony towards the Conversion of the Indians. I have had many Conversations with their chief Men, the whole Tenour of which shews there is nothing wanting to their Conversion, but one, who understands their Language well, to explain to them the Mysteries of Religion; for as to the moral Part of Christianity they understand it and assent to it. They abhor Adultery, and do not approve of Plurality of Wives. Theft is a thing not know among the Creek Nation, tho' frequent, and even honourable, amongst the Uchees. Murder they look upon as a most abominable Crime, but do not esteem the killing of an Enemy, or one that has injured them, Murder. The Passion of Revenge, which they call Honour, and Drunkenness, which they learnt from our Traders, seem to be the two greatest Obstacles to their being truly Christians: But upon both these Points they hear Reason; and with respect to drinking of Rum, I have weaned those near me a good deal from it. As for Revenge, they say, as they have no executive Power of Justice amongst them, they are forced to kill the Man who has injured them, in order to prevent others from doing the like; but they do not think that any Injury, except Adultery, or Murder, deserves Revenge. They hold, that if a Man commits Adultery, the injur'd Husband is oblig'd to have Revenge, by cutting off the Ears of the Adulterer, which if he is too sturdy and strong to submit to, then the injured Husband kills him the first Time that he has an Opportunity so to do with Safety. In Cases of Murder, the next in Blood is obliged to kill the Murderer, or else he is looked upon as infamous in the Nation where he lives; and the Weakness of the executive Power is such, that there is no other way of Punishment but by the Revenger of Blood, as the Scripture calls it. For there is no coercive power in any of their Nations. Their Kings can do no more than persuade. All the Power that they have is no more than to call their old Men and their Captains together, and to propound to them, without Interruption, the Measures they think proper. After they have done speaking, all the others have Liberty to give their Opinions also, and they reason together till they have brought each other into some unanimous Resolution. These Conferences in Matters of great Difficulty have sometimes lasted two Days, and are always carried on with great Temper and Modesty. IF they do not come into some unanimous Resolution upon the Matter, the Meeting breaks up: but if they are Unanimous (which they generally are) then they call in the young Men, and recommend to them the putting in Execution the Resolution, with their strongest and most lively Eloquence. And, indeed, they seem to me, both in Action and Expression, to be thorough Masters of true Eloquence; and, making Allowances for badness of Interpreters, many of their Speeches are equal to those which we admire most in the Greeks and Roman Writings. They generally in their Speeches use Similies and Metaphors. Their Similies were quite new to me, and generally wonderful proper and well carried on. But in the Conferences among their chief Men they are more Laconick and concise. In fine, in speaking to their young Men they generally address to the Passions; in speaking to their old Men they apply to Reason only. For Example, Tomo-chi-chi, in his first set Speech to me, among other Things said, Here is a little Present; and then gave me a Buffalo's Skin, painted on the Inside with the Head and Feathers of an Eagle. He desired me to accept it because the Eagle signified Speed, and the Buffalo Strength. That the English were as swift as the Bird, and as strong as the Beast, since, like the first, they flew from the utmost Parts of the Earth over the vast Seas; and, like the second, nothing could withstand them. That the Feathers of the Eagle were soft, and signified Love; and the Buffalo's Skin war, and signified protection, therefore he hoped that we would Love and Protect their little Families. One of the Indians of the Cherichee Nation being come down to the Governor upon the Rumour of the War, the Governor told him that he need fear nothing, but might speak freely. He answer'd smartly, 'I always speak freely; what should I fear? I am now among my Friends, and I never feared even among my Enemies.' Another Instance of their short manner of speaking was when I ordered one of the Carolina Boatmen, who was drunk, and had beaten an Indian, to be tied to a Gun till he was sober in order to be whipped; Tomo-chi-chi came to me to beg me to pardon the Boatman, which I refused to do, unless the Indian, who had been beaten, should also desire the Pardon for him. Tomo-chi-chi desired him so to do; but he insisted on Satisfaction by the Punishment of the Man; upon which Tomo-chi-chi said, 'O Fonseka (for that was his Name) this Englishman being drunk, has beat you; if he is whipt for so doing, the Englishman will expect, that, if an Indian should insult them when drunk, the Indian should be whipt for it. When you are drunk you are quarrelsome, and you know you love to be drunk, but you don't love to be whipt.' Fonseka was convinced and begged me to pardon the Man. As soon as I granted it, Tomo-chi-chi and Fonseka ran and untied him; which I perceived was done to shew that he owed his Safety to their Intercession."

Audience Given by the Trustees of Georgia to a Delegation of Creek Indians
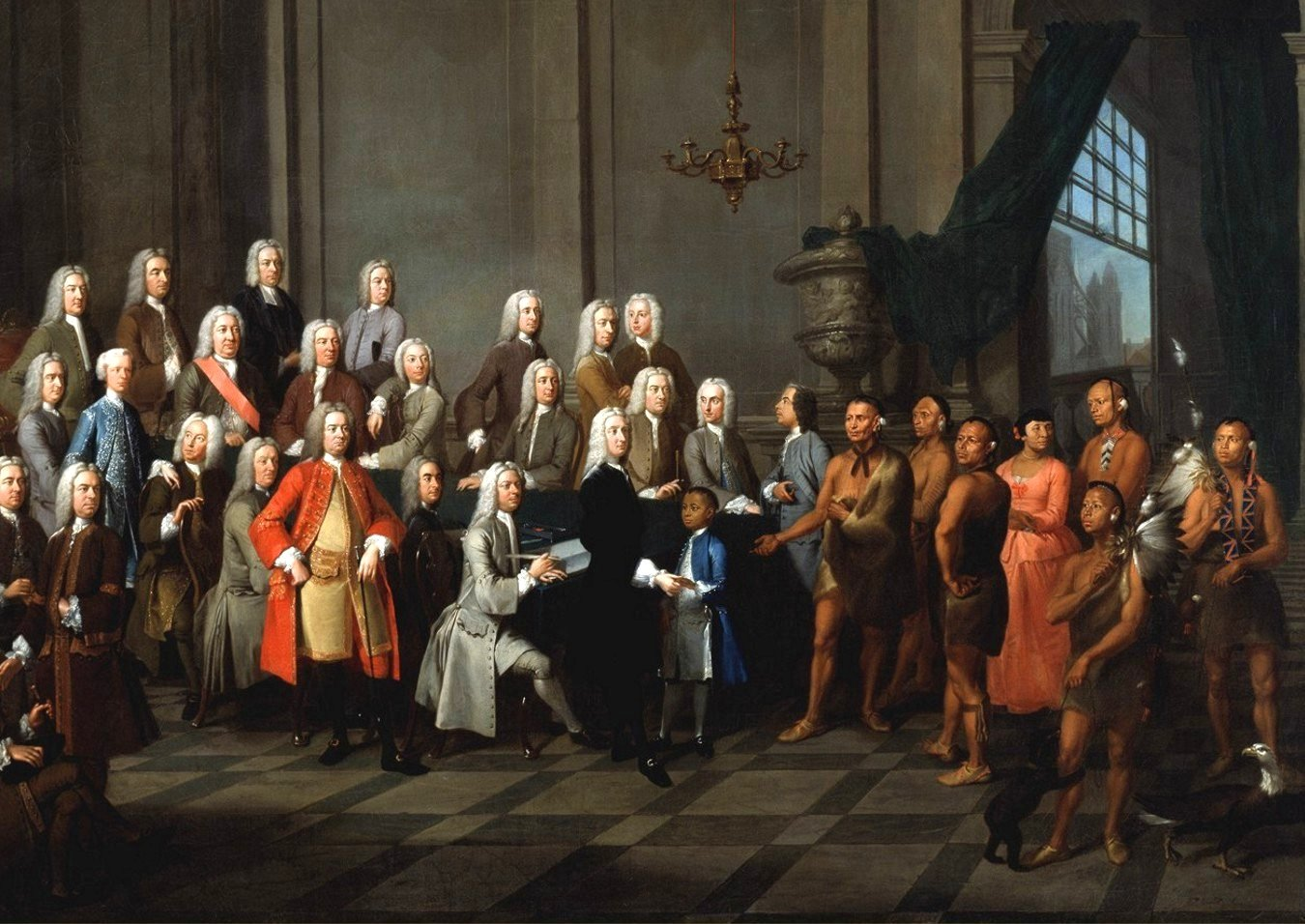
- Artist: William Verelst
- Completion date: c. 1736
- Medium: Oil on canvas
- Dimensions: 123.2 cm × 155.9 cm (48.5 in × 61.4 in)
- Location: Winterthur Museum, Garden and Library, Winterthur, Delaware

Tomochichi wanted his people to be educated. He worked with Benjamin Ingham, a friend of John Wesley and Charles Wesley, to create an Indian school at Irene that opened in September 1736.

During the first five years of British settlement, Tomochichi provided invaluable assistance to the new colony. One year after Oglethorpe's arrival, the Indian chief accompanied him back to England along with a small delegation of family and Lower Creek tribesmen. There, Tomochichi expertly fulfilled the position as mediator for his people during numerous meetings with important British dignitaries. He met King George II at Kensington Palace on August 1, 1734, and gave the King eagle feathers as a token of peace. Tomochichi's travel allowed him to be present for the ratification of the Articles of Friendship and Commerce, the treaty that both he and Oglethorpe established allowing British settlers to settle in Yamacraw Bluff in what would be named Savannah. He politely followed English mannerisms in his public appearances while pushing for recognition and realization of the demands of his people for education and fair trade. Upon his return to Georgia, Tomochichi met with other Lower Creek chieftains to reassure them of the honest intentions of these new arrivals and convinced them to establish an alliance with the British colonial authorities in Georgia.

After Oglethorpe returned to Georgia in February 1736, the chief received John Wesley, minister of Savannah, his brother Charles, and their friend Benjamin Ingham. Tomochichi reiterated his requests for Christian education for his tribe, but John Wesley rebuffed him with complex replies. Ingham, on the other hand, assisted in creating an Indian school at Irene, which opened in September 1736 much to the delight of the elderly chieftain. The same year, Tomochichi and Oglethorpe participated in an expedition to determine the southern boundaries of Georgia and helped mediate interactions with the Spanish. Tomochichi exerted his best efforts to maintain peace, and Oglethorpe regularly asked his friend for advice and assistance in achieving this goal. In February 1739, the subject met with a diplomatic delegation of Choctaws who were meeting with the British colonial authorities in Savannah. During the summer of 1739 Oglethorpe made an unprecedented journey to Coweta (present-day Columbus), deep in Indian Territory, to bolster his connections to the Lower Creeks, which resulted in a mutually favorable treaty. Tomochichi was unable to partake directly in Oglethorpe's negotiations; instead, he lay at home in his village fighting a serious illness.

== Death and legacy ==
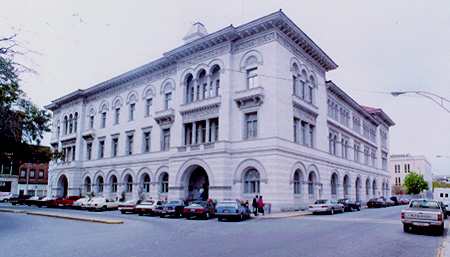
Tomochichi Federal Building and U.S. Courthouse (Chatham County, Georgia)

Tomochichi died on October 5, 1739, and while sources differ over his exact age, historians and contemporary observers generally agree that he was 95 when he died. (Lucian Lamar Knight estimates Tomochichi was 90 when Oglethorpe arrived on American shores). Before he died in 1739, he told the Creek Indians to remember how well the King treated them and he hoped that they would remain friends forever. It is believed one of his last wishes was to be "buried among the whites". He was given a public funeral by the colony, with Oglethorpe serving as one of the six pallbearers. His contributions to the colony of Georgia were celebrated with a British military funeral, and the grave site was commemorated with a marker of "a Pyramid of Stone" collected from the vicinity. Senauki, his wife, and his nephew, Toonahowi, were left in charge of the tribe, but he appointed no one to take his place as the impartial mediator between the Indians and the settlers.

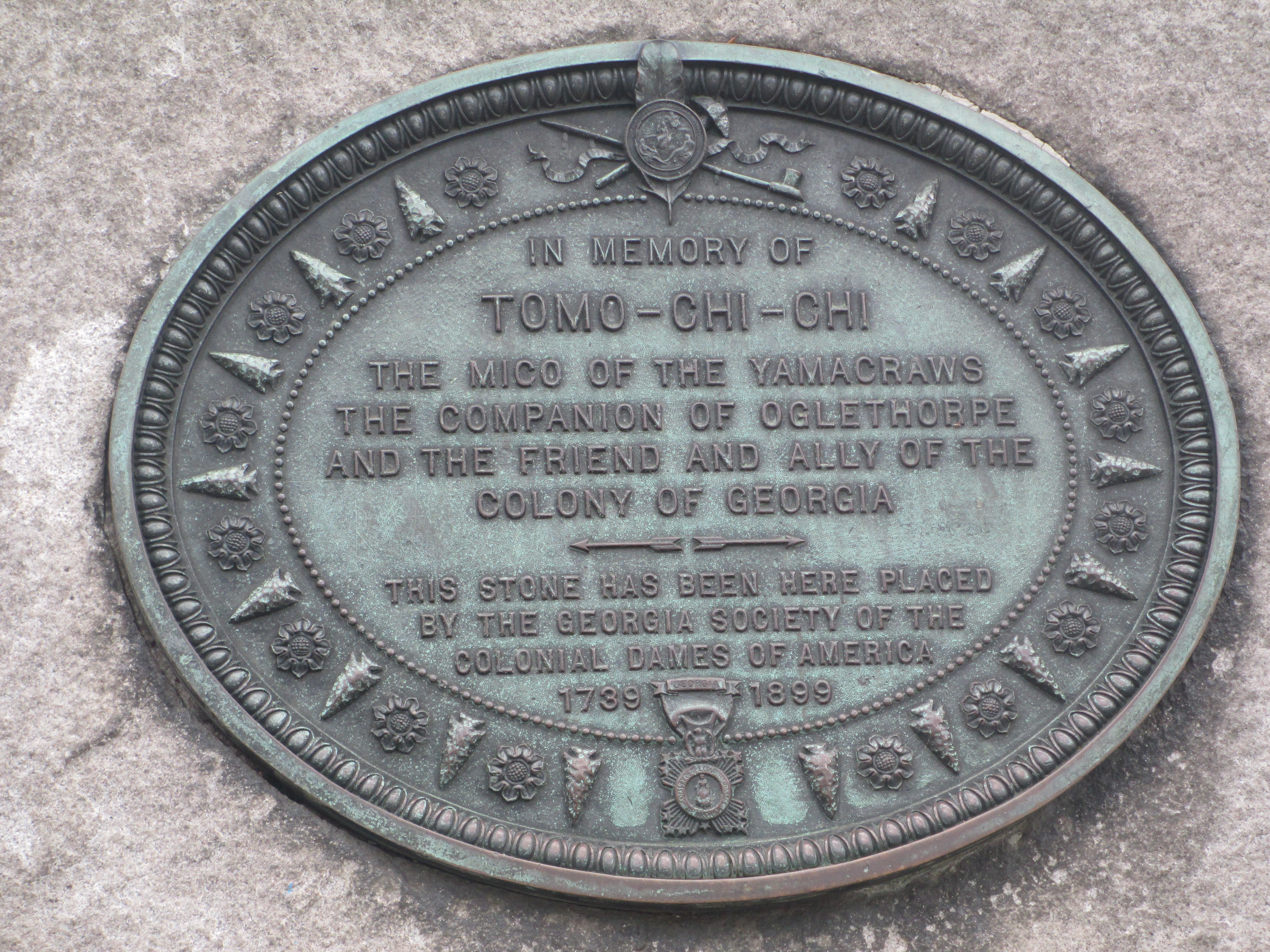
Plaque on the stone marker in Wright Square

The monument marking his gravesite was destroyed under unknown circumstances, the last known mention of the pyramid being in 1759. In the early 1870s, another monument was built on the site, this time an earthen mound with a decorative planter in the center, identical to at least four other mounds and planters built in other local squares. The planter is commonly mis-identified as the monument to Tomochichi, a mistake that arises from a 1937 Savannah Morning News article. The planter was later removed to make way for the William Washington Gordon Monument, honoring the founder of the Central of Georgia Railroad and the grandfather of Juliette Gordon Low, founder of the Girl Scouts. Upset with the lack of monument for Tomochichi, Gordon's daughter-in-law, Nellie Kinzie Gordon, had a new monument to his memory, a large granite boulder with a decorative copper plate, installed southeast of the original structure on April 21, 1899, by the Georgia Society of The National Society of The Colonial Dames of America. The Georgia Historical Commission later placed a large marker in Savannah's Wright Square, which details the achievements of the Yamacraw chieftain.

Savannah's Tomochichi Federal Building and U.S. Courthouse was named in his honor.

== See also ==
- Statue of Tomochichi
