= Jacksonboro, South Carolina =

- Census-designated place
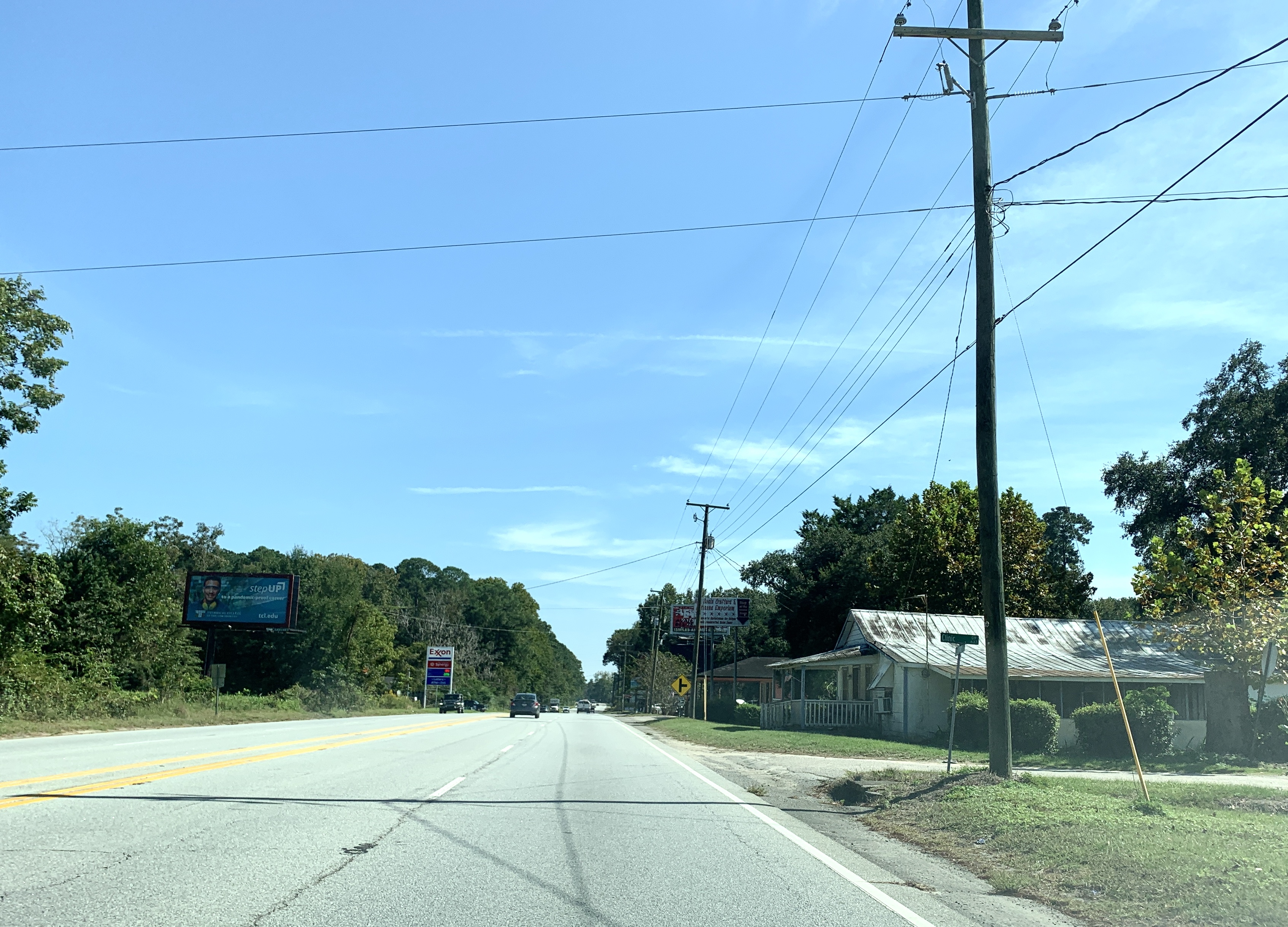
- Street scene in Jacksonboro

- Location within South Carolina Location within the United States
- Coordinates: 32°45′23″N 80°29′26″W
- Country: United States
- State: South Carolina
- County: Colleton

Area
  - Total: 14.47 sq mi (37.47 km^{2})
  - Land: 14.47 sq mi (37.47 km^{2})
  - Water: 0 sq mi (0.00 km^{2})
- Elevation: 13 ft (4.0 m)

Population (2020)
  - Total: 412
  - Density: 28.5/sq mi (10.99/km^{2})
- Time zone: UTC-5 (Eastern (EST))
  - Summer (DST): UTC-4 (EDT)
- ZIP code: 29446
- Area codes: 843 and 854
- GNIS feature ID: 2629834

Jacksonboro is an unincorporated community and census-designated place located in southeastern Colleton County, South Carolina, United States, along the west side of the Edisto River. Jacksonboro serves as a primary junction along U.S. Highway 17 between Charleston 32 miles (51 km) to the east and Beaufort 41 miles (66 km) to the southwest. Walterboro, the Colleton County seat, is 16 miles (26 km) to the northwest via South Carolina Highway 64. The population of Jacksonboro was 478 as of the 2010 census.

Jacksonboro was founded in the 1730s, and named after John Jackson, the original owner of the town site. The South Carolina General Assembly convened in the town, then known as "Jacksonborough," between January 8 and February 26, 1782 as British forces occupied Charleston following the Siege of Charleston. The Pon Pon Chapel was listed in the National Register of Historic Places in 1972.

== History ==
In 1663, Charles II granted eight proprietorships to eight Lords, including the county namesake, Sir John Colleton. Following a period of English, French and American emigration to the area between the late 1600's and 1720, enslaved people outnumbered the settlers (numbering 1,240) by more than 500 people, at 1,778.

Settlers first selected a location along the Chehaw river, but fled the area after the Yemassee War, a bloody conflict between settlers and surrounding indigenous populations. Settlers moved down the Edisto towards the cost, settling about 20 miles from the river's mouth - a location from which it is thought they would be able to more quickly seek refuge in the event of another attack.

Members of the Edisto Natchez-Kusso tribe, whom settlers would have encountered, referred to that final stretch of the river and the area surrounding it as "Pon Pon." However, settlers quickly renamed the town "Jacksonborough." John Jackson, the namesake, received 400 acres along the Edisto in a 1701 land grant.

== Demographics ==
Historical population
Census	Pop.	Note	%±
2020	412		—
U.S. Decennial Census
