= Michael Cash (stonemason) =

Irish stonemason

- Born: 1833; Blackwater, County Wexford, Ireland
- Died: 1880 (aged 46 or 47); Savannah, Georgia, U.S.
- Known for: Stonemasonry

Michael Cash (1833–1880) was an Irish stonemason who was active in the mid-19th century. His most notable work is the Factors Walk retaining wall in Savannah, Georgia, which was built between 1855 and (after interruption) 1869.

== Factors Walk retaining wall ==
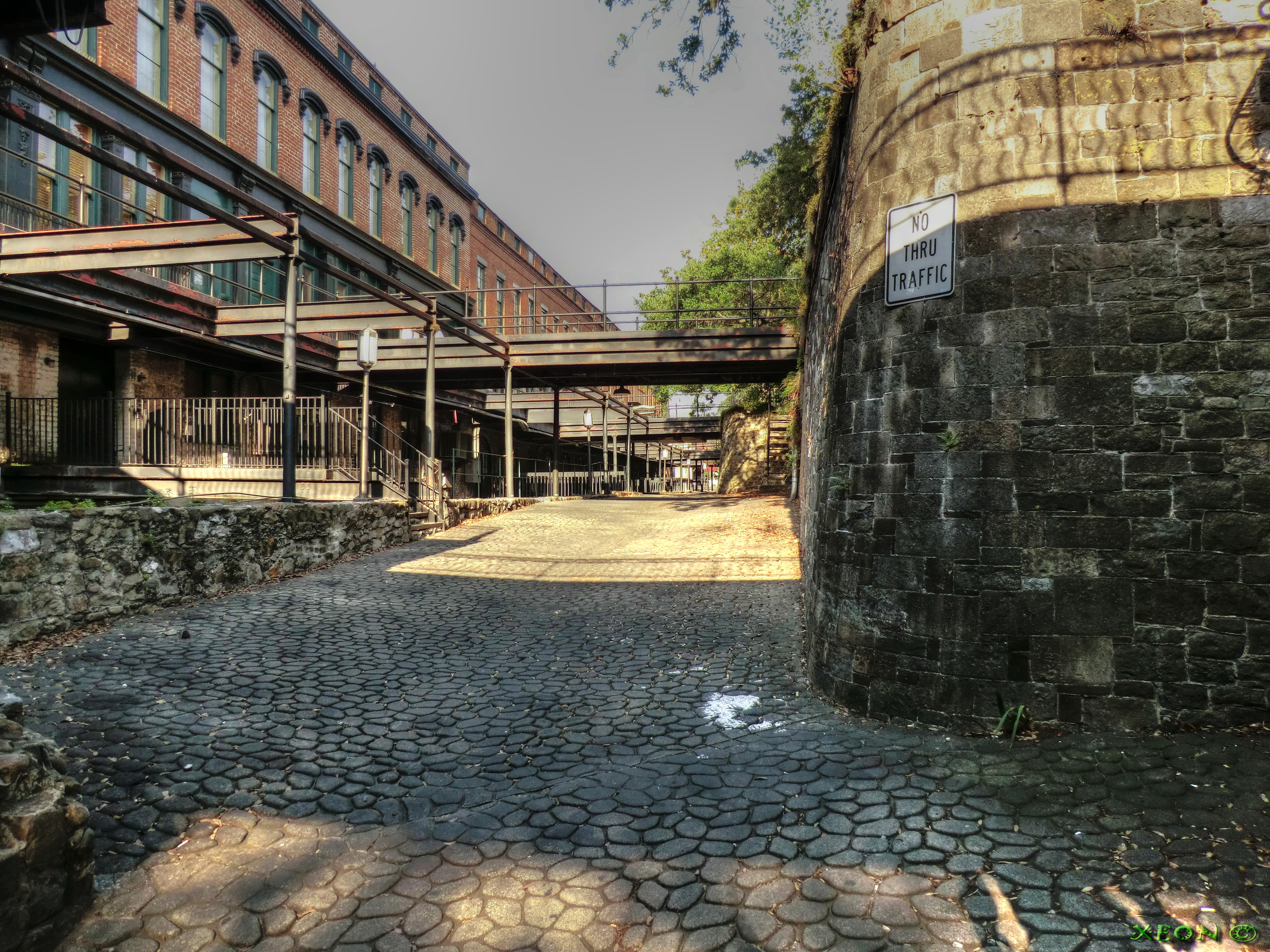
Part of the retaining wall, Cash's handiwork, is visible on the right

Cash's most notable work is the Factors Walk retaining wall that separates River Street and its working waterfront from the city of Savannah, Georgia, United States. The wall, which runs for 0.75 miles (1.21 km) and averages 19 feet (5.8 m) in height, is part of Savannah's Historic District. Its purpose was to provide access to shipping while also preventing erosion of the 40-foot-high bluff beside the Savannah River. Most of the wall was built from 1855, shortly after his arrival in the United States, to 1858, but it was not completed until 1869. The wall was partially dismantled by U.S. soldiers during the Civil War, with the blocks placed in the river to block Confederate vessels. It was repaired in 1866.

== War years and beyond ==
Cash served in the Confederate Army, and the subsequent post-war years provided more work for him: he was the contractor for work done on River Street and its docks, as well as several paving jobs, including that between East Broad and Drayton Streets, and the wooden pavement between Drayton and Whitaker Streets.

== Personal life ==
Cash was born in Blackwater, County Wexford, Ireland, in 1833. In the mid 1840s, he moved to Savannah. He worked out of a shop on Indian Street, which runs parallel to River Street near its western terminus. 81 per cent of the residential population in that area at that time was Irish-born, and almost half of that contingent was from County Wexford, according to a 2017 study.

He joined the Irish Union Society, and in 1872 he returned to his home town for the summer but fell ill.

Cash was found clinically insane towards the end of his life. He was taken to Savannah's county jail for "safe keeping," before a jury returned a verdict that found Cash insane and incapable of managing his estate. It is believed he was taken to an asylum in Baltimore or more locally in Milledgeville, Georgia.

== Later years and death ==
Cash eventually returned to Savannah and continued in the business of construction. He won a contract to build a new sewer at Perry and Barnard Streets, and to install a new stone pier and steps at the Exchange.

In 1880, Cash was injured while erecting some stonework. He died several weeks later, aged 46 or 47. His obituary in the Savannah Morning News described him as a "highly esteemed citizen and well-known contractor" who had "accumulated" in the city "a handsome competency" and "made many friends among all classes of our people".
