= Blackwater, County Wexford =

Village in County Wexford, Ireland

Blackwater An Abhainn Dubh
- Village
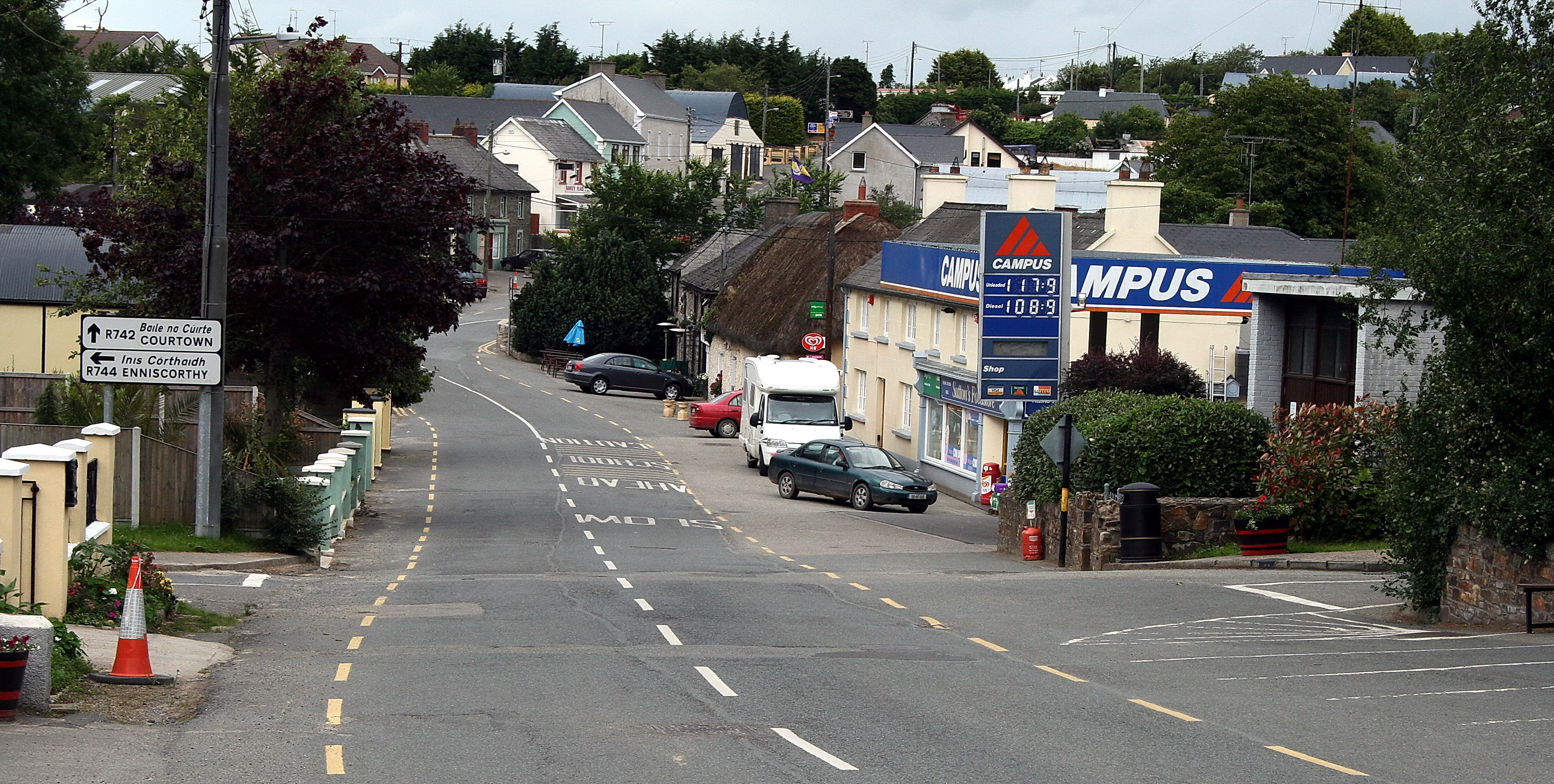
- The R742 passes through Blackwater

- Location in Ireland
- Coordinates: 52°26′42″N 6°21′00″W
- Country: Ireland
- Province: Leinster
- County: County Wexford
- Elevation: 48 m (157 ft)

Population (2022)
  - Total: 485
- (The environs of Blackwater village are sometimes labelled 'Castle Ellis' in census reports)
- Time zone: UTC+0 (WET)
  - Summer (DST): UTC-1 (IST (WEST))
- Irish Grid Reference: T121342

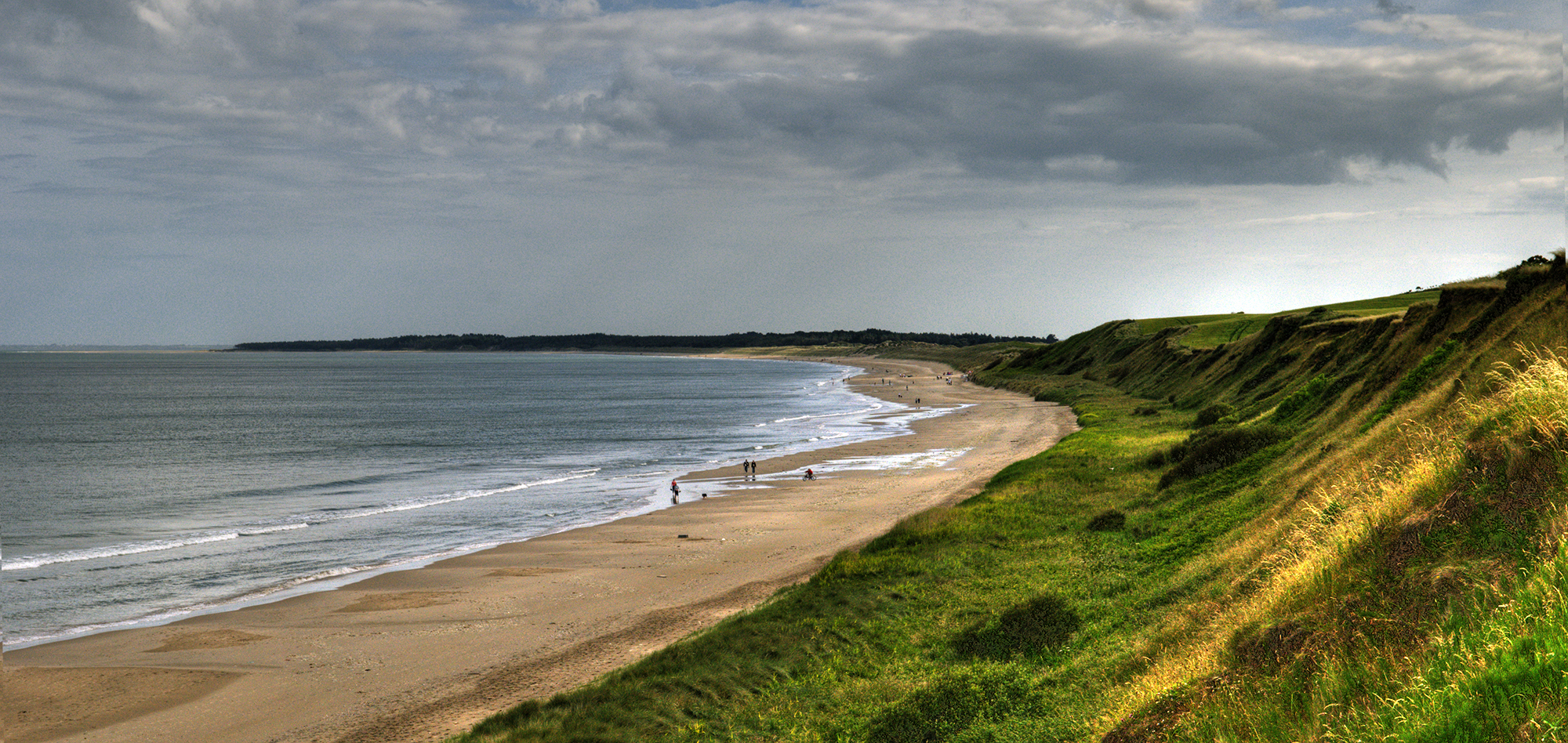
Ballinesker Beach, Blackwater, Co Wexford

Blackwater (Irish: An Abhainn Dubh, meaning 'the black river') is a rural village in County Wexford, Ireland. It lies mostly within the townland of Ballynaglogh (Irish: Baile na gCloch, meaning 'the town of the stones') on the R742 regional road 16 km (9.9 mi) north of Wexford town.

== History ==
Evidence of ancient settlement in the area includes a number of ringfort, holy well, motte and ecclesiastical enclosure sites in the townlands of Ballynaglogh, Inch, Glebe and Castletalbot. A church and graveyard site, in Glebe townland, contained a church that was standing as of the early 17th century but was in ruin by at least the mid-19th century.

Castletalbot, a country house built c. 1753 and historically associated with the Talbot family, is to the north of the village. St Brigid's Catholic Church, within the village, was built in 1831.

== Transport ==
Michael Gray operates a route linking the village with Wexford Mondays to Fridays inclusive Bus Éireann route 379 serves the village on Mondays and Saturdays only linking it to Wexford, Gorey and intermediate locations such as Courtown Harbour.

== Demographics ==
In the 10 years between the 2006 and 2016 census, the population of the village increased from 173 to 339 people. By 2022, it had a population of 485.

== Community ==
Blackwater has competed in "category B" (places with populations of between 201 and 1000 people) in the national Tidy Towns competition.

Blackwater is close to Ballyconnigar beach, and the stretch of beach from Ballyconnigar to Ballynaclash is used for bathing, walking and fishing. Species of fish recorded in the area include bullhuss, smoothhound, tope, bass, ray, codling, eels, and flounder. Other nearby beaches include Curracloe strand and Ballinesker beach, where the opening scene of the film "Saving Private Ryan" was filmed.

== Sports ==
The local GAA team is St. Brigid's Blackwater, established in 1885. The hurling team play in the Wexford Intermediate Hurling Championship. The Gaelic football team won the 2009 Wexford Junior Championship.

Blackwater has a par 3 golf course which is located outside of the village between Blackwater and Kilmuckridge. The golf course itself was opened in July 1993 although Blackwater Golf Society had its first outing in 1991. Blackwater Golf Course also has a FootGolf course.

There are a number of walking trails in the Coillte-managed forest to the east of Blackwater village.

== In popular culture ==
Blackwater served as a setting of Mary Kay Tuberty's 2015 novel Keeper of Coin.

== Notable people ==
- Michael Cash, stonemason
- Colm Tóibín, writer, holidayed here as a child and has a holiday home nearby.

== See also ==
- List of towns and villages in Ireland
