= Craven County, South Carolina =

Coordinates: 33.73°N 79.46°W

Craven County, South Carolina was one of the three original counties established by the Lords Proprietor of the English colony of Carolana in 1682 to include the colony's lands stretching from Awendaw Creek north to the western shore of Winyah Bay and inland. In 1685, the original county of Berkeley was expanded to include the southwestern part of Craven County, and in 1691, land was added to Craven County from the previously unorganized land to its northeast.

In 1706, the Lords Proprietor established the Church of England Parish system in South Carolina, reducing counties to geographic designations with no administrative functions; the southwestern half of Craven County was organized into St. James Santee Parish, and in 1721, Prince George Parish was organized for the former northeastern half of Craven County, extending into the unorganized territory to the north and east of the county.

In 1734 Prince Frederick Parish was organized from northwestern Prince George Parish, extending into the unorganized territory to the northwest of the county. In 1735 their common boundary was redefined and Prince George Parish reduced in extent when the border with the Province of North Carolina was established.

In 1769, judicial districts incorporating the parishes were established in the colony; St. James Santee Parish was taken into Charlestown District, and Prince George Parish into Georgetown District.

In 1785, the new State of South Carolina established counties within the judicial districts, with Washington and Marion counties taking in St. James Santee Parish of Charleston District, and Williamsburg and Winyaw (later spelled Winyah) counties taking in Prince George Parish of Georgetown District. These counties did not immediately become functional, and the judicial districts retained their administrative functions.

The 1868 South Carolina State Constitution gave the state districts the uniform designation of county, by which they are still known. In 1882, a new Berkeley County was formed from upland Charleston County, taking in land formerly in Marion and Washington counties; Charleston County retained the coastal lands originally included in Craven County. In 1893, Charleston County expanded northwestward into Berkeley County. The original Craven County's lands now lie in parts of Berkeley, Charleston, Georgetown, and Williamsburg counties.
