= Yamacraw, Kentucky =

Unincorporated community in Kentucky, United States

- Unincorporated community
- Location within Kentucky Location within the United States
- Coordinates: 36°43′1″N 84°32′15″W
- Country: United States
- State: Kentucky
- County: McCreary
- Elevation: 994 ft (303 m)
- Time zone: UTC-6 (Central (CST))
  - Summer (DST): UTC-5 (CST)
- GNIS feature ID: 516499

Yamacraw is an unincorporated community and coal town in McCreary County, Kentucky, United States. It was also known as Big South Fork. Their post office closed in 1950. The Lonesome post office was associated with the Yamacraw area.
