= USCGC Yamacraw =

Two ships of the United States Coast Guard were named Yamacraw:

- USRC Yamacraw, 1909, known as USCGC Yamacraw after 1915
- USCGC Yamacraw (WARC-333)
