= Prince Frederick's Chapel Ruins =

Historic ruins in South Carolina, United States

- U.S. National Register of Historic Places
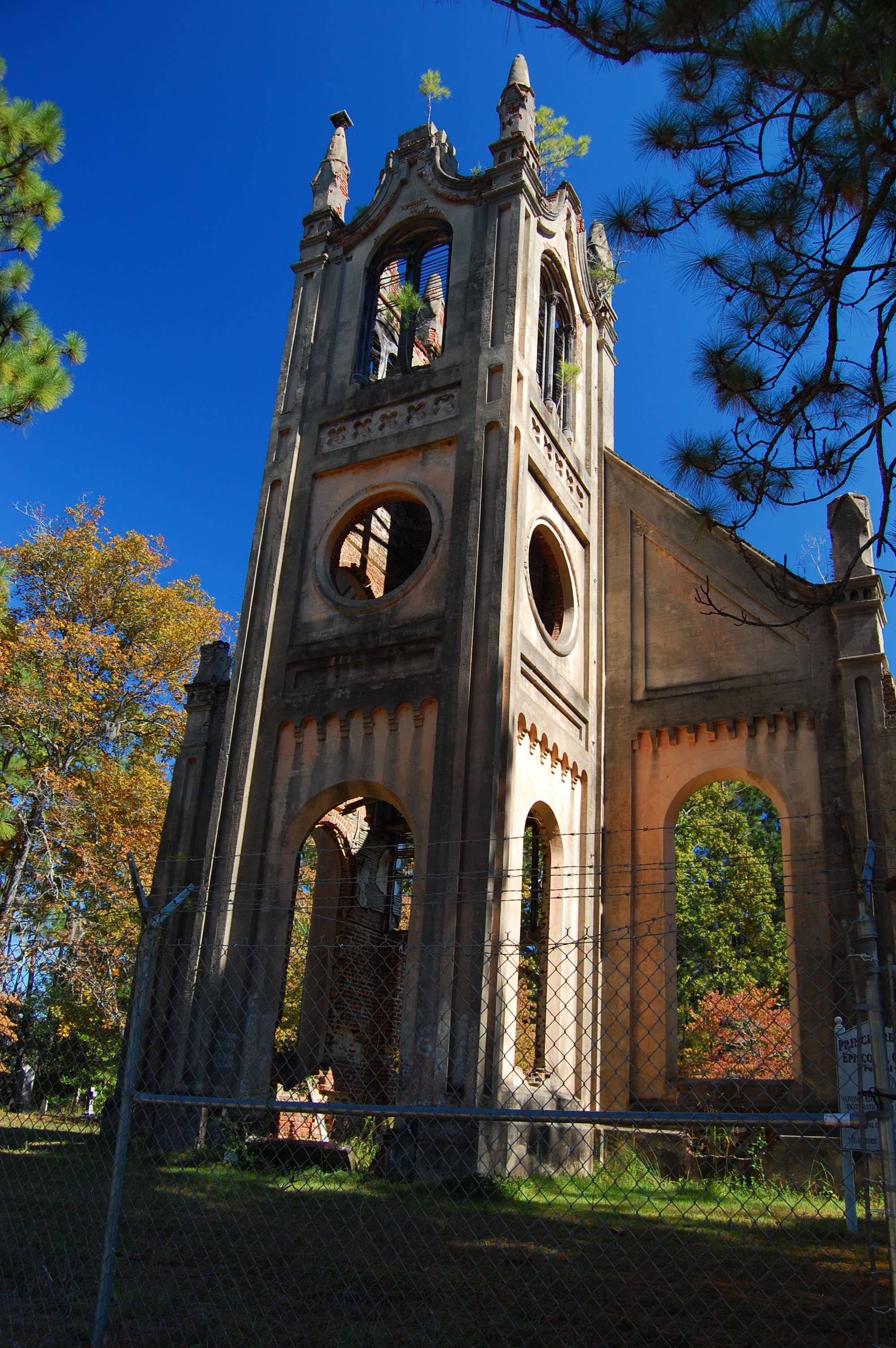
- Ruins at Prince Frederick's Chapel

- Location within South Carolina Location within the United States
- Location: Southeast of Plantersville on County Road 52, near Plantersville, South Carolina
- Coordinates: 33°30′20″N 79°10′49″W
- Area: 1.5 acres (0.61 ha)
- Built: 1859
- NRHP reference No.: 74001858
- Added to NRHP: August 28, 1974

Prince Frederick's Chapel Ruins is a historic site in Plantersville, South Carolina.

The first church on this site, known as Prince Frederick's Chapel, Pee Dee, was built in 1848 on a site donated by the Rev. Hugh Fraser in 1834. Most of the parishioners were rice planters along the Pee Dee River. These ruins are of the second church here, approved by a committee of Robert Francis Withers Allston, Davison McDowell, and Francis Weston and begun in 1859 but interrupted by the Civil War.

The Gothic Revival church designed by Louis J. Barbot was completed in 1876 with a gift of $1,700 by John Earle Allston. With the decline of rice planting the church gradually fell into disrepair and was eventually deemed unsafe. It was demolished in 1966, leaving only the front wall and tower.

The ruins were listed in the National Register of Historic Places in 1974.
