= Pon Pon Chapel =

- U.S. National Register of Historic Places
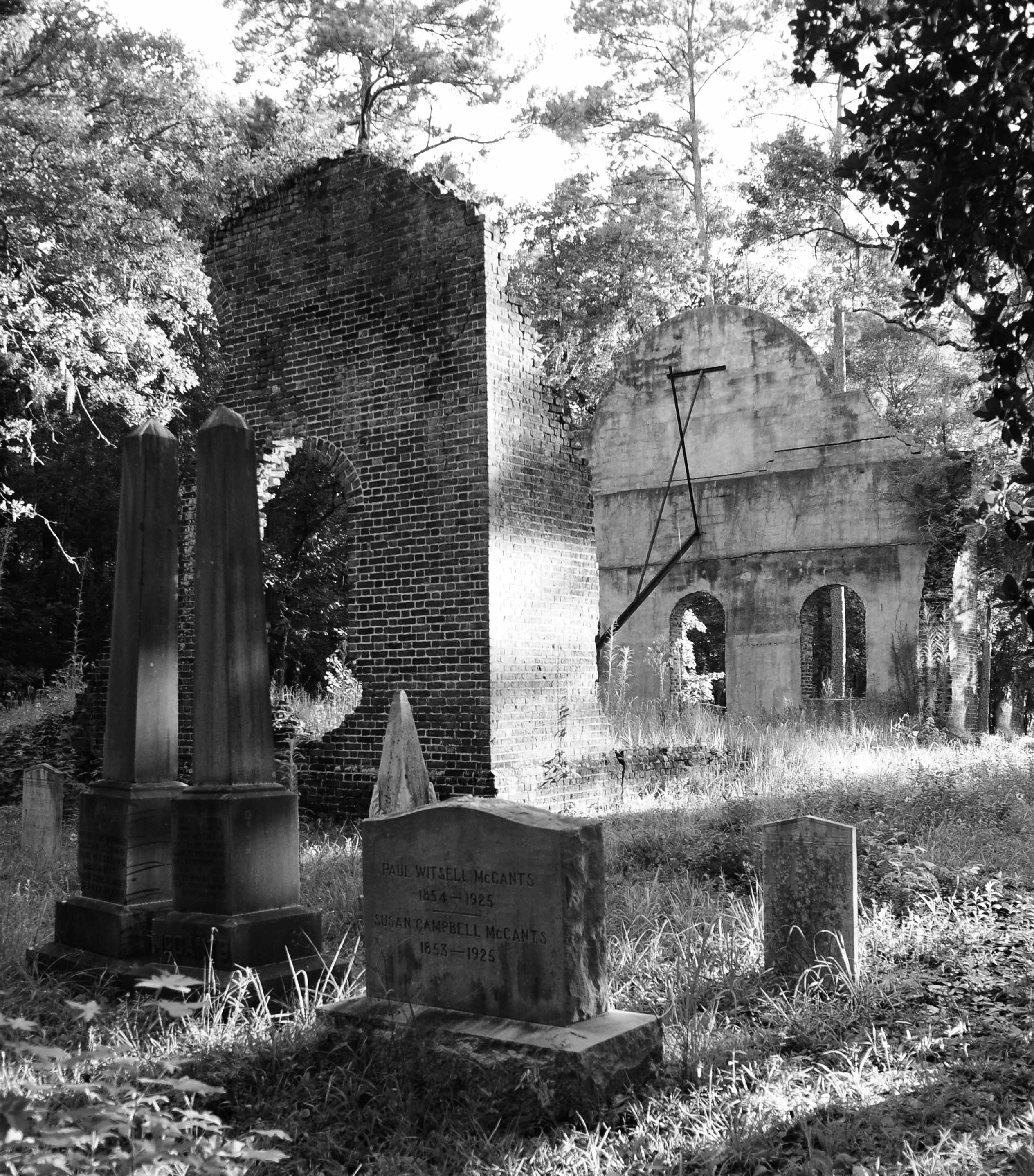

- Location within South Carolina Location within the United States
- Nearest city: Jacksonboro, South Carolina
- Coordinates: 32°48′30″N 80°29′33″W
- Area: 4.1 acres (1.7 ha)
- Built: 1820
- NRHP reference No.: 72001205
- Added to NRHP: January 5, 1972

Pon Pon Chapel was built in 1820 in Jacksonboro, South Carolina. It was located "on Parker’s Ferry Road, the busy stagecoach thoroughfare that connected Charleston, South Carolina and Savannah, Georgia." Today, Parker's Ferry Road is a barely paved road along the south side of a power line right of way, and the ruins of the chapel can be found along this road east of Jacksonboro Road (State Road S-15-40).

It was listed on the National Register of Historic Places in 1972.
