= Cainhoy Historic District =

Historic district in South Carolina, United States

- U.S. National Register of Historic Places
- U.S. Historic district
- Location within South Carolina Location within the United States
- Location: Southeast of Huger, near Huger, South Carolina
- Coordinates: 32°55′39″N 79°49′59″W
- Area: 30 acres (12 ha)
- Built by: How, John, et al.
- Architectural style: Federal
- NRHP reference No.: 82003832
- Added to NRHP: March 11, 1982

Cainhoy Historic District is a national historic district located near Huger, Berkeley County, South Carolina. It encompasses nine contributing buildings, which range in date from the mid-18th century through the early-20th century. They represent the development of the village from a ferry landing to a small but thriving river port. It was the site of America's first porcelain factory, established by John Bartlam in 1765. Each building is a vernacular specimen from its respective period, including the Federal style. Cainhoy's significance lies in its role as an early transportation link between inland Berkeley County and Charleston and in its fine collection of early buildings. In 1876, Cainhoy was the site of a political rally for Wade Hampton (1818-1902) which degenerated into a brawl between blacks and whites. Christened the "Cainhoy Massacre," the incident left seven men dead and sixteen wounded.

It was listed in the National Register of Historic Places in 1982. In 2014, plans were made to develop the environmentally significant and sensitive Cainhoy Peninsula.

== See also ==
- South Carolina civil disturbances of 1876
