= Yamacraw =

Former Native American band from 18th century

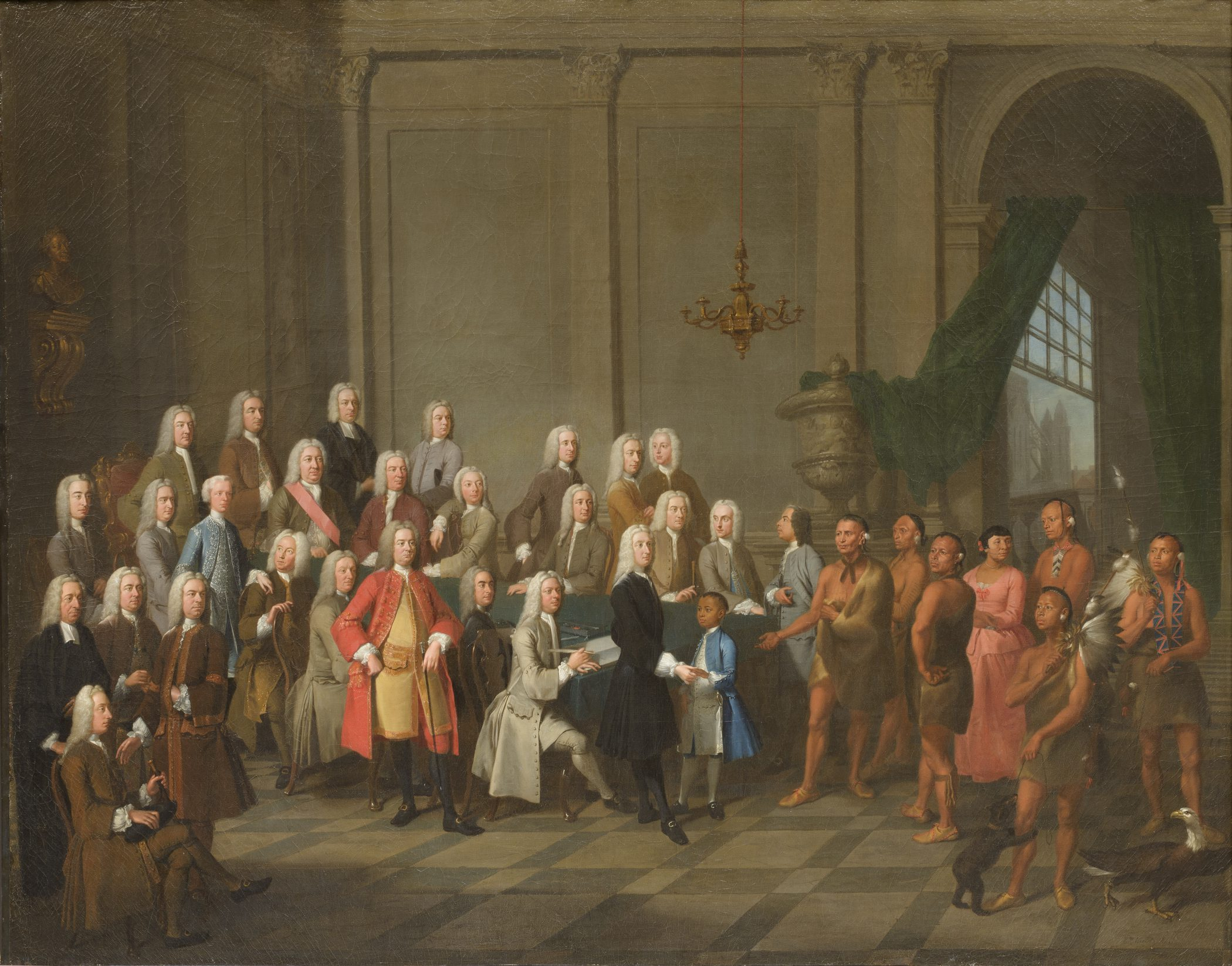
A Yamacraw delegation (right) meeting with the Trustees for the Establishment of the Colony of Georgia in America in 1734

The Yamacraw were a Native American tribe that emerged in the early 18th century, occupying parts of what became Georgia, specifically along the bluffs near the mouth of the Savannah River where it enters the Atlantic Ocean. They were made up of Lower Creek and Yamasee, and remained independent for about 20 years before integrating again with the main part of the Lower Creek people. Their area was later developed as the city of Savannah.

== History ==
The Yamacraw tribe was formed in the late 1720s by leader Tomochichi from some bands of Yamasee and Lower Creek people who had disagreed with the severing of friendship with the British during the Yamasee War of 1715. By 1728 the Yamacraw had settled along the Savannah River near its mouth. This was later developed as the present-day city of Savannah. In 1733 James Oglethorpe, interested in founding a colony at the site because of its strategic location on the water, negotiated with Tomochichi and the Yamacraw agreed to move their village upriver.

A mid-19th century history of Tomochichi noted dissension over the status of this name and people. Charles Colcock Jones wrote that the Creek did not acknowledge any people known as the Yamacraw. Also he said that neither the Maskoki (Muskogee) nor Yuchi dialects of the region used the "r" in such a way as in that name.
