= Clementia (disambiguation) =

Clementia is a Roman goddess. It can also refer to:

== People ==
- Clementia of Aquitaine (1048–1130), daughter of William VII, Duke of Aquitaine and Ermensinde de Longwy
- Clementia of Burgundy (c. 1078–c. 1133), countess of Flanders
- Clementia of Catanzaro (fl. 1145–1179/81), countess of Catanzaro in the Kingdom of Sicily
- Clementia of Hungary (1293–1328), queen of France and Navarre
- Clementia of Zähringen (died 1175), daughter of Conrad I, Duke of Zähringen and Clementia of Namur
- Clementia Killewald (1954–2016), German Benedictine nun, abbess and Doctor of the Church
- Clementia Taylor (1810–1908), English women's rights activist and radical
- Yannis Clementia (born 1997), Martiniquais football goalkeeper

== Other uses ==
- Clementia, South Carolina, United States, a ghost town

== See also ==
- De Clementia, essay written in AD 55–56 by Seneca the Younger
