= Charleston Light =

Lighthouse in South Carolina, US

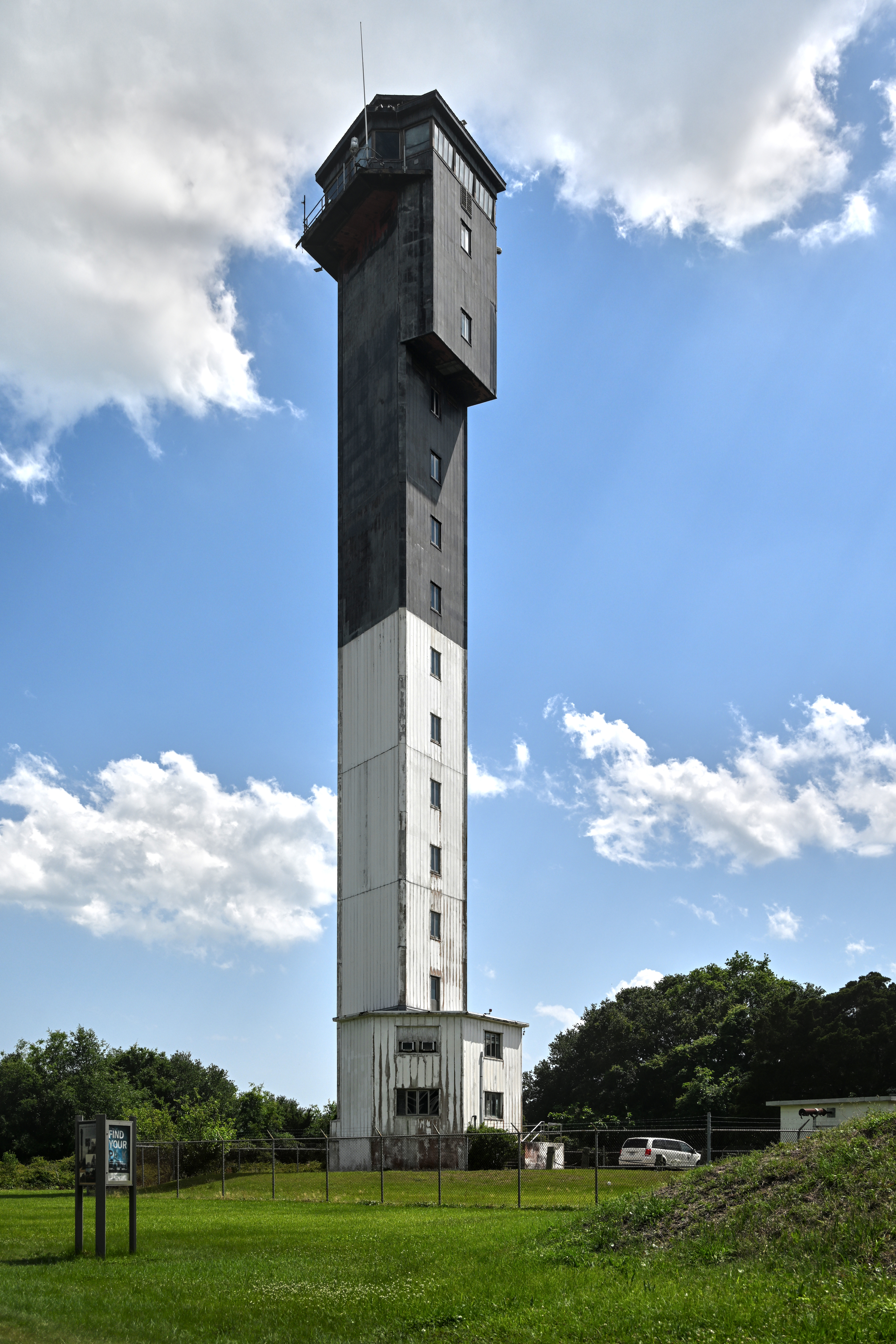
- Location: Sullivan's Island, South Carolina
- Coordinates: 32°45′28.5″N 79°50′35.7″W

Tower
- Constructed: 1960
- Foundation: Concrete
- Construction: Steel with aluminum alloy skin
- Automated: 1975
- Height: 140 feet (43 m)
- Shape: Triangular
- Markings: Upper half black, lower half white
- Fog signal: none

Light
- First lit: 1962
- Focal height: 163 feet (50 m)
- Lens: DCB 24
- Range: 26 nautical miles (48 km; 30 mi)
- Characteristic: Flashing white, 2 every 30 sec.

Charleston Light, also known as Sullivan's Island Lighthouse, is located on Sullivan's Island, South Carolina, which is the northern entrance to Charleston Harbor. Designed by Thomas Sullivan, the lighthouse was erected to replace the defunct Morris Island Light on Morris Island, which was at risk of being destroyed by erosion, but which remains standing and was stabilized in 2010. Construction of the Charleston Light was started in 1960, and it was first lit on June 15, 1962.

Charleston Light has a steel frame, an aluminum alloy skin, and a triangular cross section. It is 140 feet (43 m) tall. Its slim, triangular structure was built to withstand winds of 125 miles per hour, and the focal plane of the light is 163 feet (50 m) above mean sea level. Originally, it was painted white and red-orange, but was later repainted white and black after citizens complained about the distracting color of the upper half. It is the only U.S. lighthouse with an elevator and air conditioning, and was the last onshore manned lighthouse to be built by the Federal Government. The Texas Tower Offshore Lighthouses were the last offshore manned lighthouses and, were built later starting in 1961 with Buzzards Bay Entrance Light.

It was originally fitted with an Aerobeacon DCB-24 carbon-arc light producing 28 million candelas (candlepower) and was the second most powerful in the Western Hemisphere. As the light was actually too dazzling, the light was replaced by a Vega Industries Ltd VRB-25 VRB-25 rotating beacon and could still be seen over 20 nautical miles (37 km; 23 mi). Its characteristic is two 0.2 s flashes separated by 4.8 s every 30 s. The light was automated in 1975.

It is a non-contributing resource located in the U.S. Coast Guard Historic District. Now part of Fort Sumter and Fort Moultrie National Historical Park. Although it was donated by the Coast Guard to the National Park System in 2007, the Coast Guard continues to maintain the light of the lighthouse, while the National Park System protects its historical significance and overall physical upkeep.

Although this lighthouse is still a working light, many problems within its structure keep it from being open to the public. Currently it is fenced off from civilians, but visitors are able to explore the surrounding grounds, as well as the adjacent public beach access, in order to view the lighthouse.

== Images ==
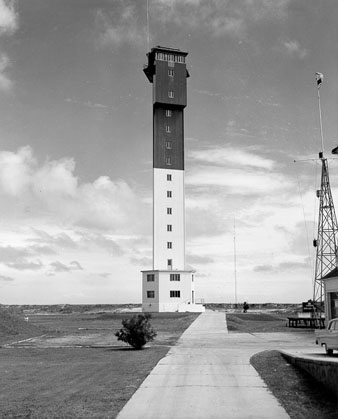
The lighthouse in 1962

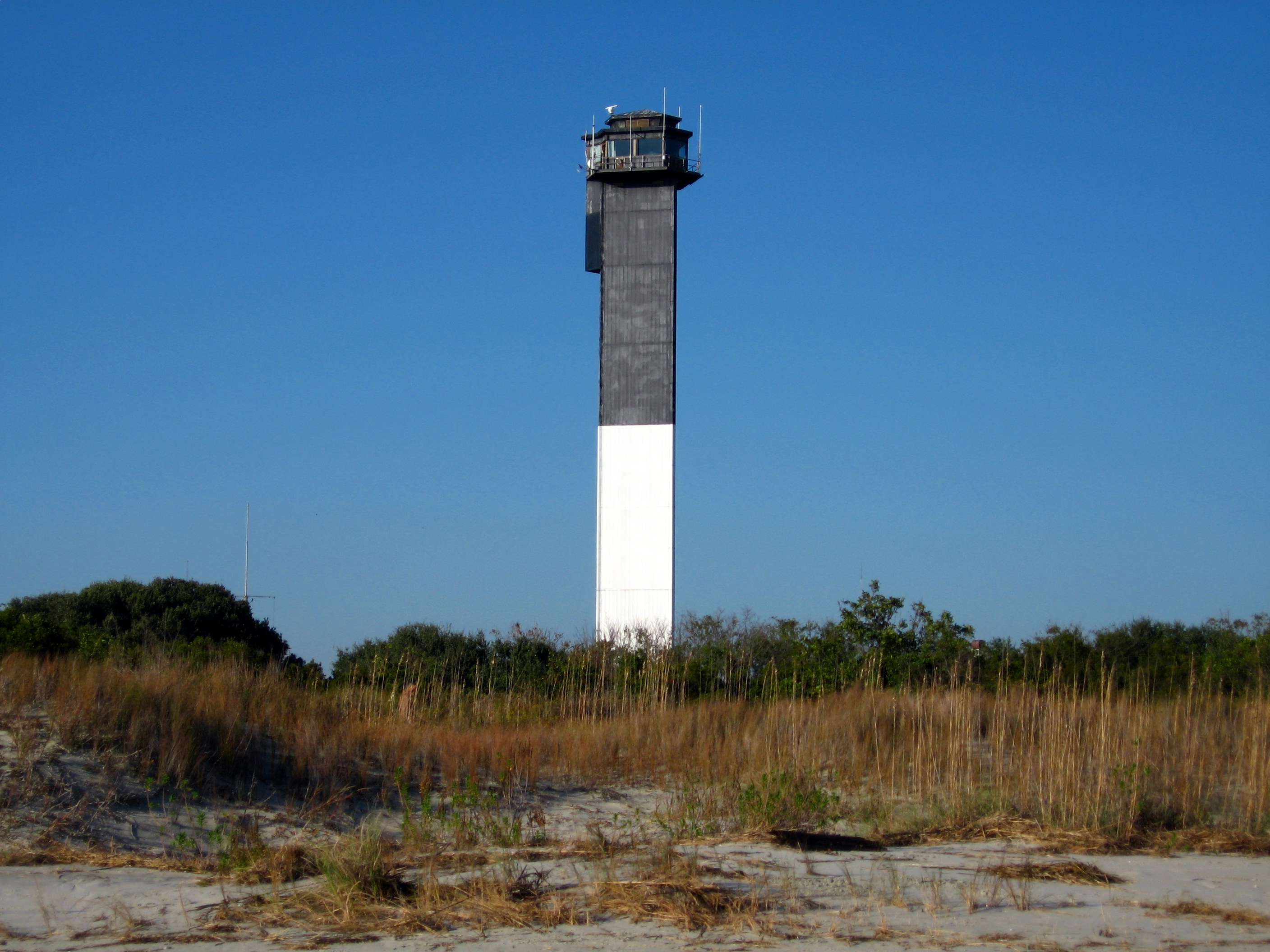
Charleston Light viewed from the beach

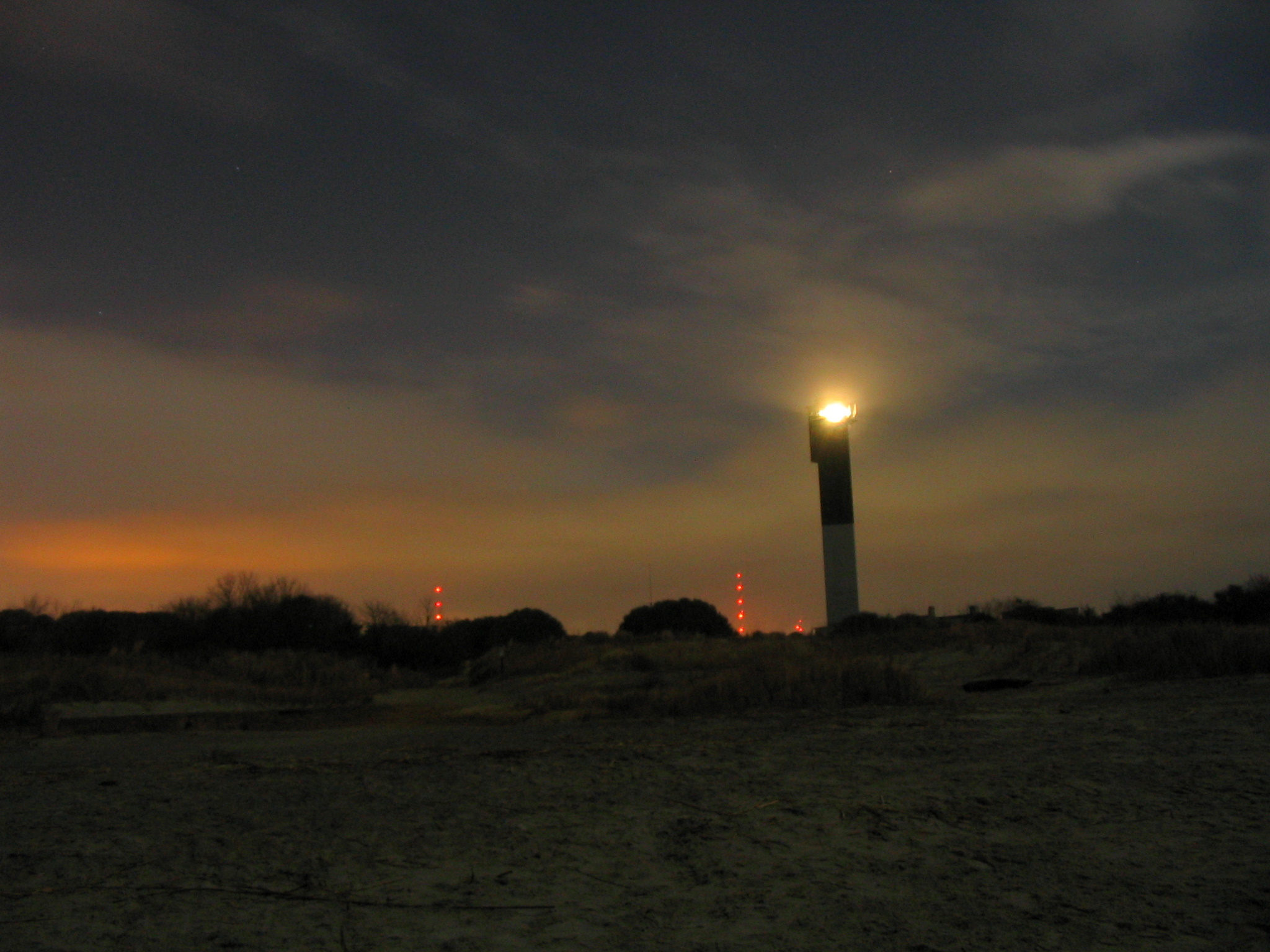
Charleston Light viewed from the beach at dusk

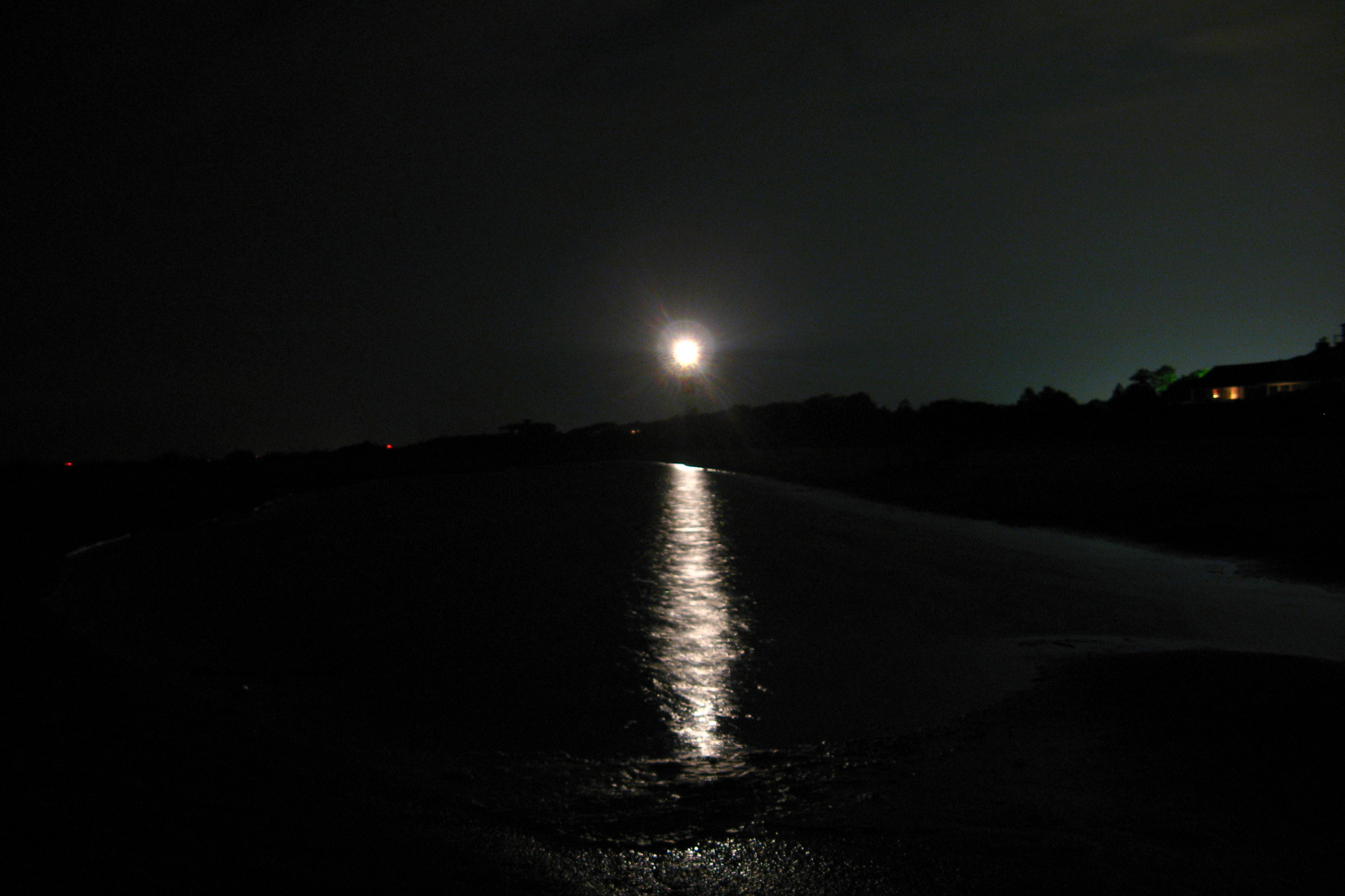
Charleston Light viewed from the beach at night

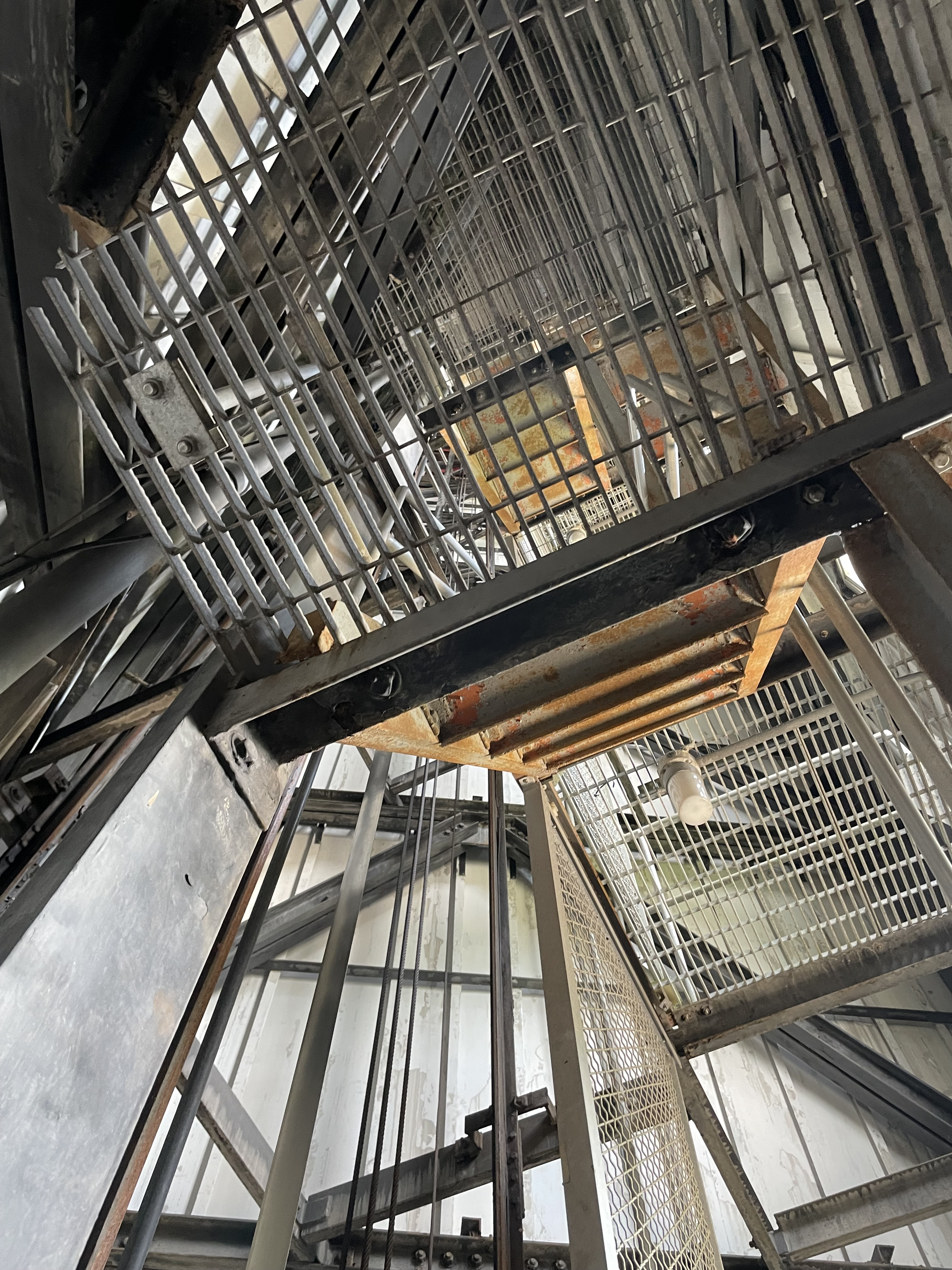
Staircase

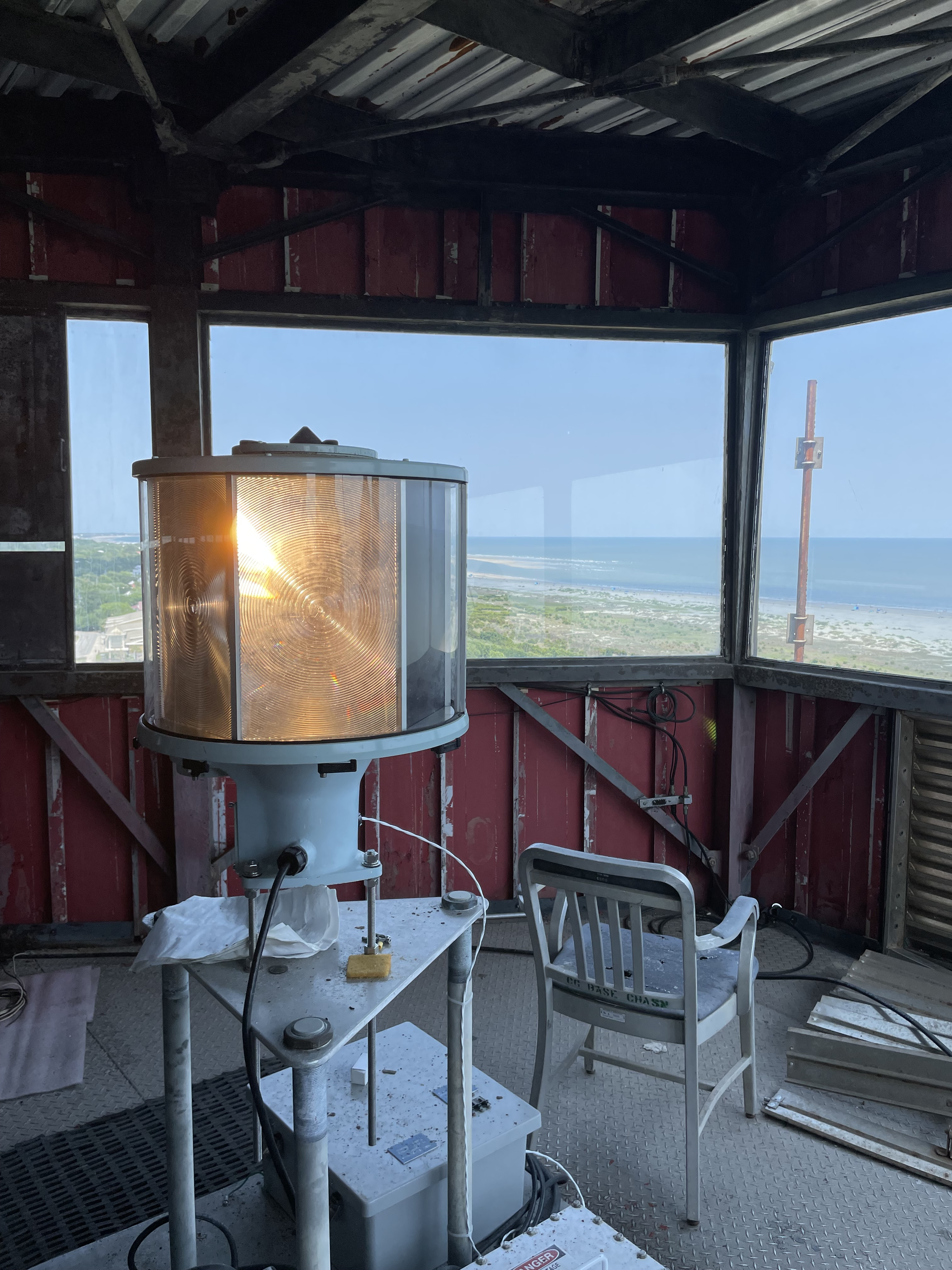
Beacon inside the lantern
