= Ashley River (disambiguation) =

The Ashley River is a river in South Carolina in the United States.

Ashley River may also refer to:

- Ashley River / Rakahuri, a river in the Canterbury region of New Zealand
- Ashley River, South Carolina, an unincorporated community in the United States
- Ashley River Historic District, Historic District in South Carolina, United States
