= Barrelville =

Barrelville may refer to:

- Barrelville, Maryland
- Barrelville, South Carolina
