= U.S. Coast Guard Historic District =

Historic district in South Carolina, United States

- U.S. National Register of Historic Places
- U.S. Historic district
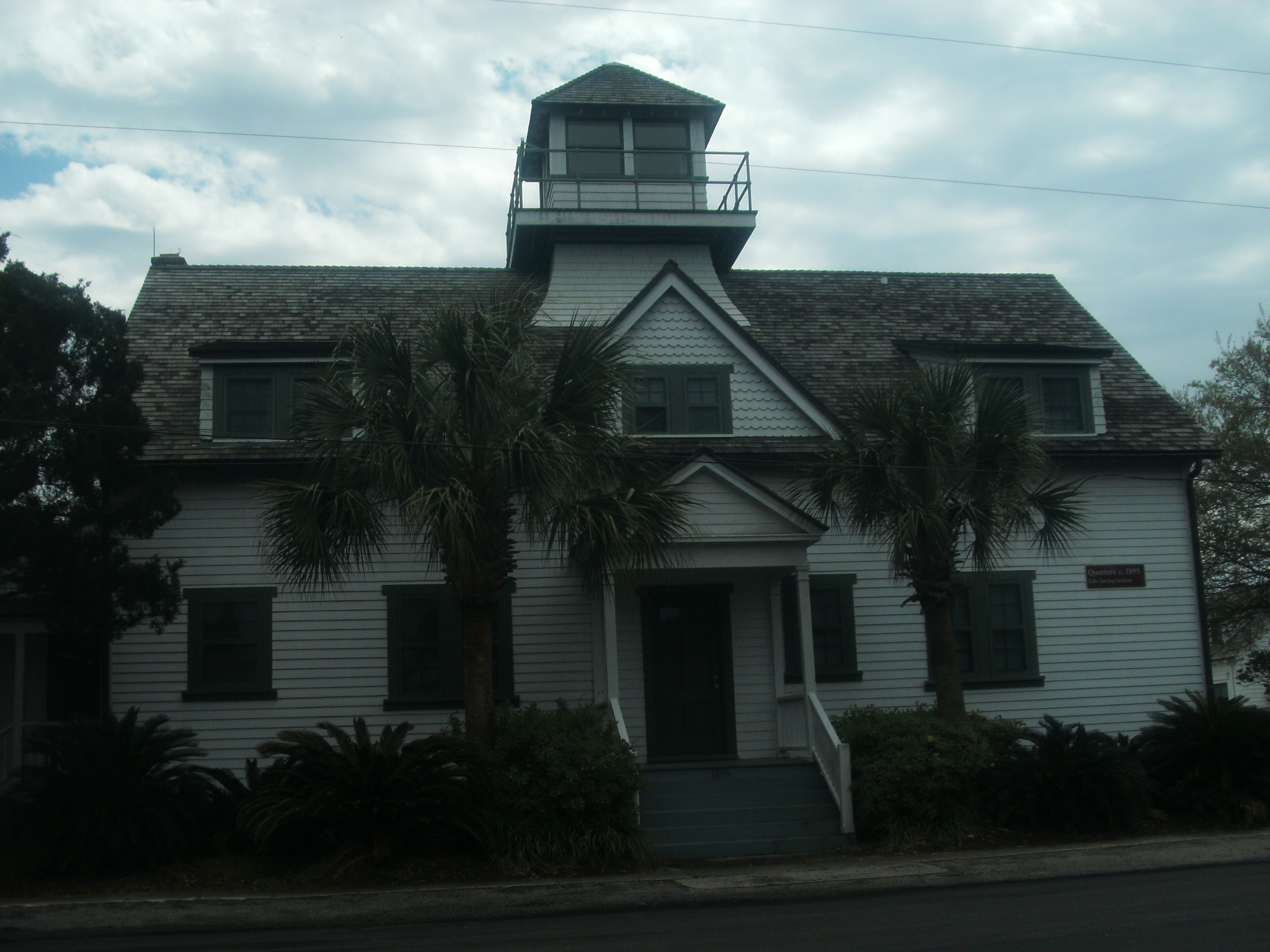
- Lifesaving station and quarters, March 2015

- Location within South Carolina Location within the United States
- Location: Ion Ave. between Station 18 and Station 18 1/2, Sullivan's Island, South Carolina
- Coordinates: 32°45′27″N 79°50′33″W
- Area: 5 acres (2.0 ha)
- Built: 1919
- NRHP reference No.: 73001703
- Added to NRHP: June 19, 1973

U.S. Coast Guard Historic District is a national historic district located at Sullivan's Island, Charleston County, South Carolina. The district encompasses three contributing buildings and one contributing structure on Sullivan's Island. The property was established as a life saving station in 1891. The district contains the station house/administration building (c. 1891), boathouse (c. 1891), garage (c. 1938), and signal tower (c. 1938), which are laid out in an L-shaped court loosely organized around the bunker/sighting station (c. 1898). Also on the property is the non-contributing Charleston Light (ca. 1962).

It was listed on the National Register of Historic Places in 1973.
