= Morris Island =

Uninhabited island in South Carolina, United States

Coordinates: 32°42′57″N 79°53′25″W

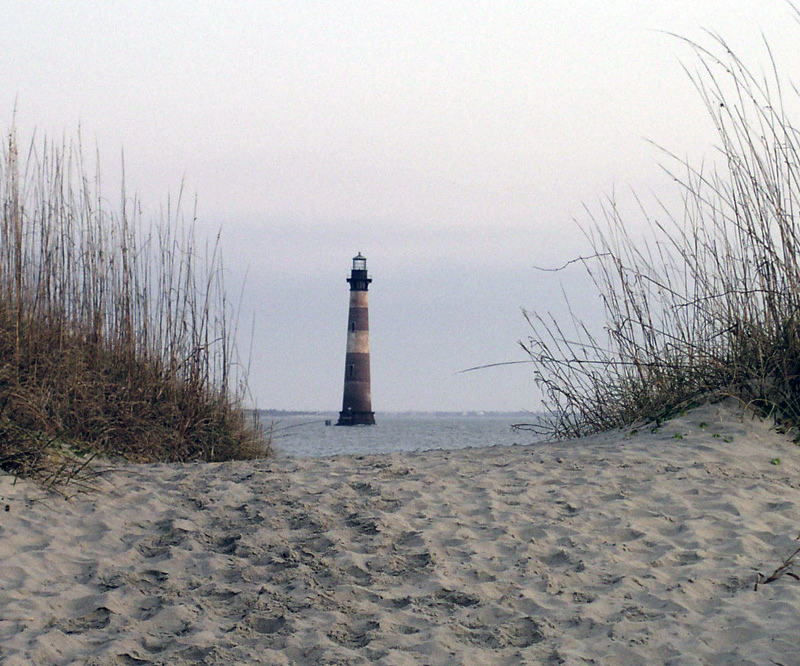
Morris Island Lighthouse

Morris Island is an 840-acre (3.4 km^{2}) uninhabited island in Charleston Harbor in South Carolina, accessible only by boat. The island lies in the outer reaches of the harbor and was thus a strategic location in the American Civil War. The island is part of the cities of Charleston and Folly Beach, in Charleston County.

== History ==
Morris Island was heavily fortified to defend Charleston Harbor, with the fortifications centered on Fort Wagner. Battery Gregg was also on the island. Morris Island had heavy fighting during the Union Army's campaign to capture Charleston, and is perhaps best known today as the scene of the ill-fated assault by the 54th Massachusetts Volunteer Infantry, an African-American regiment. The regiment and this assault, where it suffered over 50% casualties, was immortalized in the film Glory.

After the Confederates abandoned Morris Island in 1863, the Union occupied it. In the next year, they transferred 600 Confederate officers from Fort Delaware to Morris Island, 50 of whom were quickly exchanged. The others were utilized as human shields in an attempt to silence the Confederate artillery at Fort Sumter; in reaction to what the Confederacy did with POWs in Charleston to deter Union ships from firing on the city. None of these men were killed by artillery fire though several died of sickness. They soon became known in the South as the Immortal Six Hundred.

Beach erosion has destroyed any trace of the original fortifications on the island, including Fort Wagner.

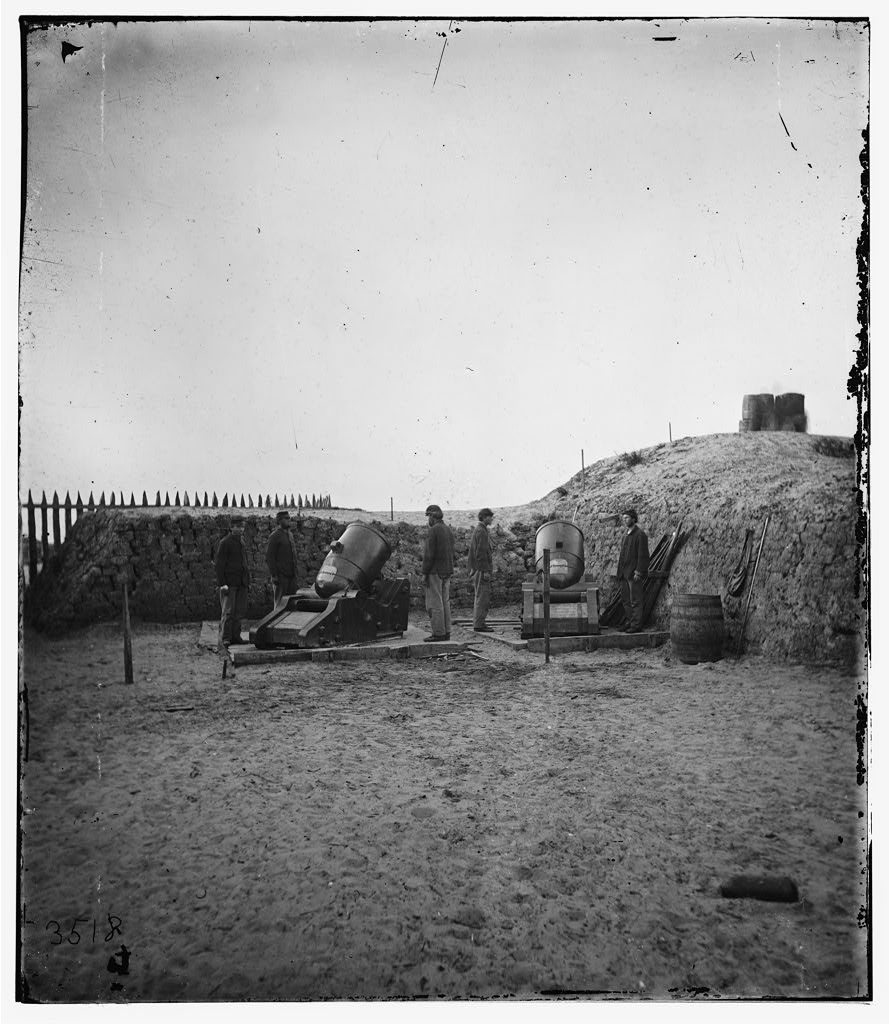
Union Army mortar battery on Morris Island, 1865

== Morris Island Light ==
Morris Island is home to Morris Island Light, a lighthouse that stands on the southern side of the entrance to Charleston Harbor, north of the town of Folly Beach.

== Ownership and preservation ==
Plans to commercially develop the 125 acres (506,000 m^{2}) of high ground on the northern tip of Morris Island as a luxury residential area resulted in several groups fighting to have the island declared a national historical park or added to Fort Sumter and Fort Moultrie National Historical Park.

In January 2005, Charleston developer Harry Huffman, listed the 125 acres (0.51 km^{2}) for sale on eBay for $12.5 million. Huffman was in negotiations to sell the island to a consortium of preservation groups, but claimed to have listed the island to see if there was any other interest. Huffman had waged a number of battles with the local development agencies to increase the zoning, which limited construction to five homes, but claimed to have grown tired of fighting and just wanted to sell.

On February 2, 2006, the Trust for Public Land (TPL), a non-profit private land conservation organization, announced the purchase of Morris Island for $4.5 million. Ginn Resorts had previously purchased the island for a reported $6.5 million. In May 2008, TPL and partners, including the South Carolina Conservation Bank, the South Carolina State Ports Authority, the American Battlefield Trust (then known as the Civil War Trust) and many private donors, purchased the island on behalf of the City of Charleston from Ginn Resorts for $3 million. In 2003, when a builder announced his plans to build houses on the tract, for which he had an option to buy, the Trust, local preservationist Blake Hallman and others formed the Morris Island Coalition, generated media attention and support for preservation and defeated the effort. Ginn Resorts was interested in developing the property, too, but ultimately decided to purchase it and then immediately sell it to the preservationists. According to TPL, the city and county are working "to complete a management plan to protect the island's nationally significant historical and natural resources."

== In Fiction ==
In the novel series Virals, by Kathy Reichs, the main characters all live on Morris Island.

== Bibliography ==
- Zeller, Bob (2017). Fighting the Second Civil War: A History of Battlefield Preservation and the Emergence of the Civil War Trust. Knox Press.
