= Wambaw Swamp =

Swamp in South Carolina, United States

Wambaw Swamp Wilderness
- IUCN category Ib (wilderness area)
- Location within South Carolina
- Location: Charleston County, South Carolina, USA
- Nearest city: McClellanville, South Carolina
- Coordinates: 33.1117703°N 79.6295859°W
- Area: 4,755 acres (19 km^{2})
- Established: 1980
- Governing body: U.S. Forest Service

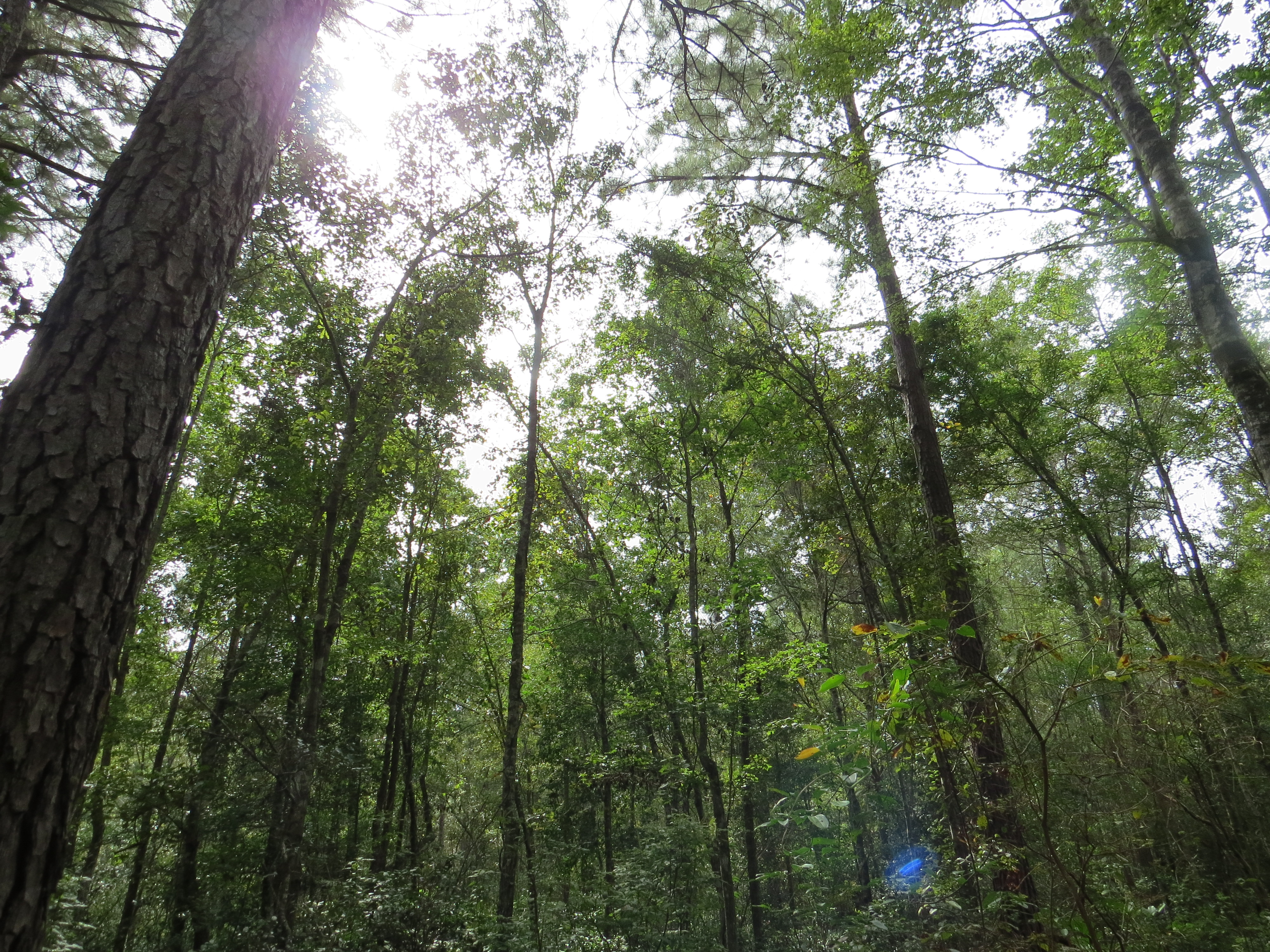
Typical river-bottom hardwood forest from the Little Wambaw Swamp Wilderness

Wambaw Swamp is a swamp in northeastern Charleston County, South Carolina. It is located entirely within the Francis Marion National Forest and contains 4,755 acres (19 km^{2}), all of which is designated as a wilderness area. This forest wetland is a mix of river-bottom hardwood and pine. To the southeast lies the Little Wambaw Swamp Wilderness, a 4,967 acres (20 km^{2}) wilderness area managed by the U.S. Forest Service. The area is similar to the main Wambaw Swamp ecologically with more high ground for walking and camping. Wambaw Creek Wilderness protects 1,832 acres (7 km^{2}) of the watershed along the Charleston and Berkeley County line as it leaves the swamps and empties into the South Santee River near Hampton Plantation State Historic Site.

== Geological setting ==
The Wambaw Swamp lies in a geological province known as the coastal terraces, with surface features derived from the Pleistocene inundations of the Atlantic Ocean. During this epoch, the Atlantic Ocean advanced and retreated over this area numerous times. The successive shorelines created alternating tidal flats and barrier islands, similar to those along the present coastline just to the southeast of the swamp; today these features, stranded on higher land once the ocean retreated, are marked by terraces and scarps, respectively. These scarps create barriers to drainage, capturing runoff and leading to the formation of swamps on their landward side. The Wambaw Swamp system is one such swamp.

The highest ground in the Wambaw Swamp system is the Little Wambaw Swamp, which formed on the Princess Anne Terrace, bounded on the south by the Mount Pleasant Scarp and the north by the Awendaw Scarp. The Little Wambaw Swamp drains north through a gap in the Awendaw Scarp into the Wambaw Swamp proper, which is contained between the Awendaw and Cainhoy Scarps on the Pamlico Terrace. The Wambaw Swamp drains east along the Pamlico Terrace, parallel to the scarps and coast, into the Santee River.
