= Charleston County, South Carolina =

County in South Carolina, United States

- County
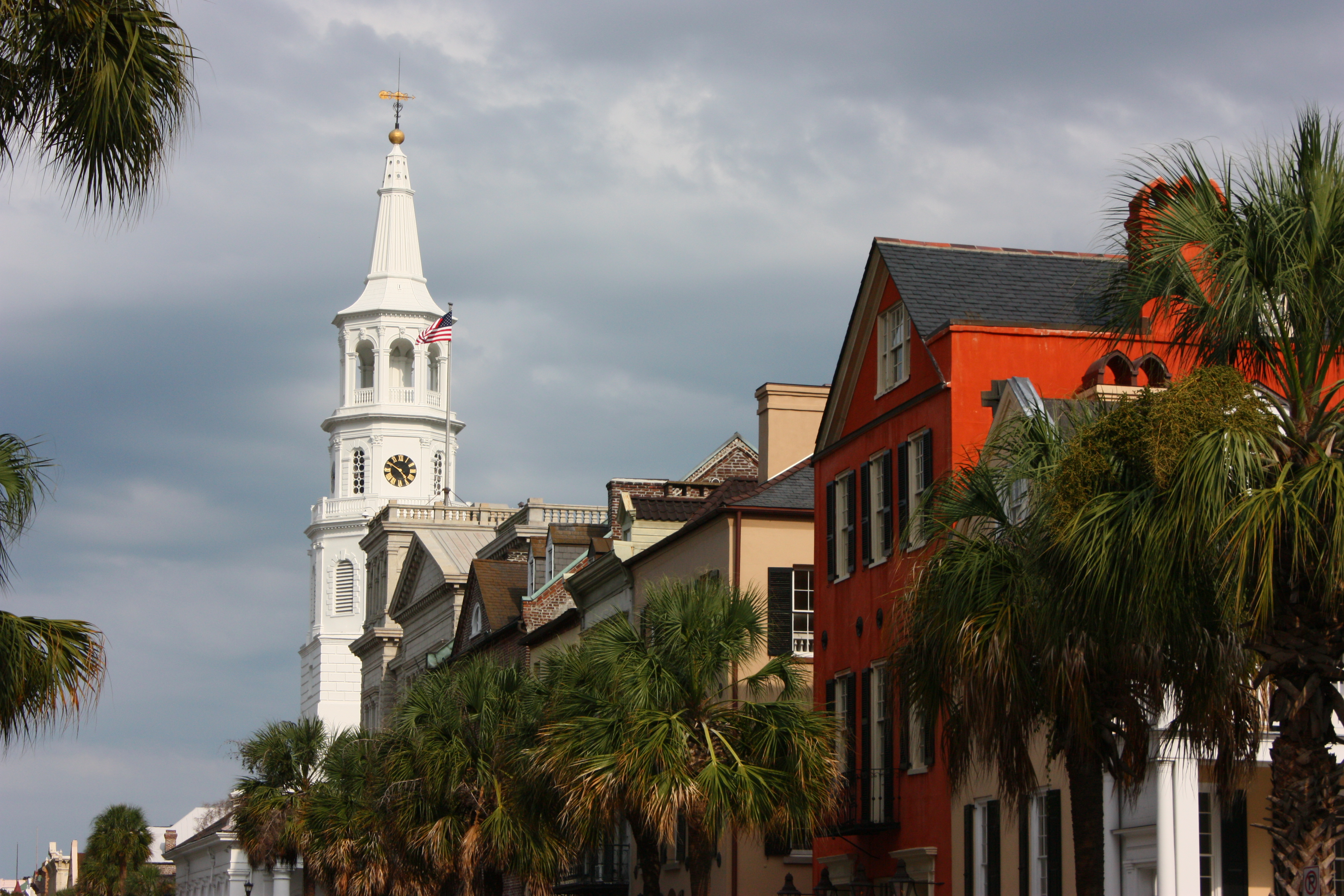
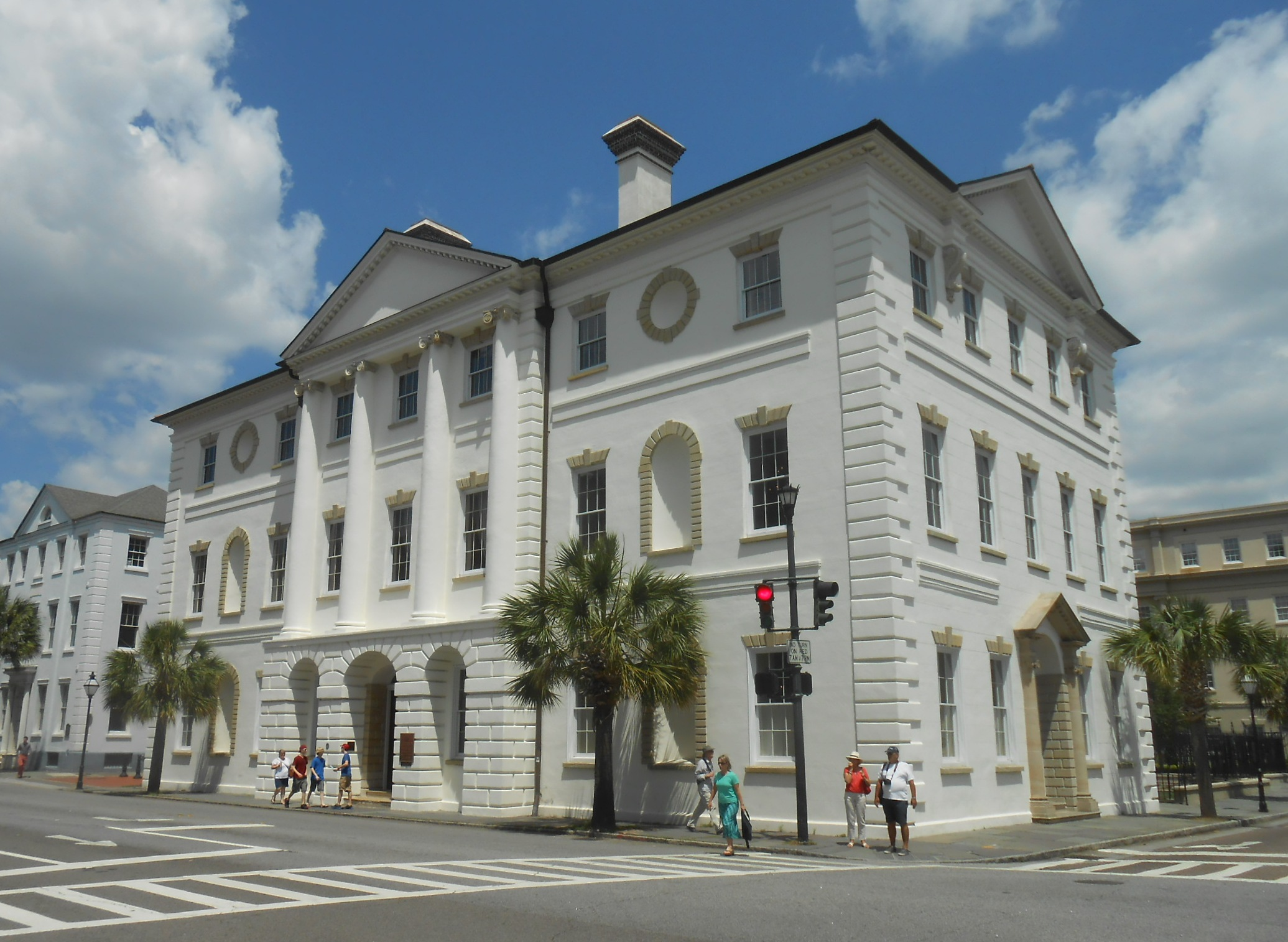
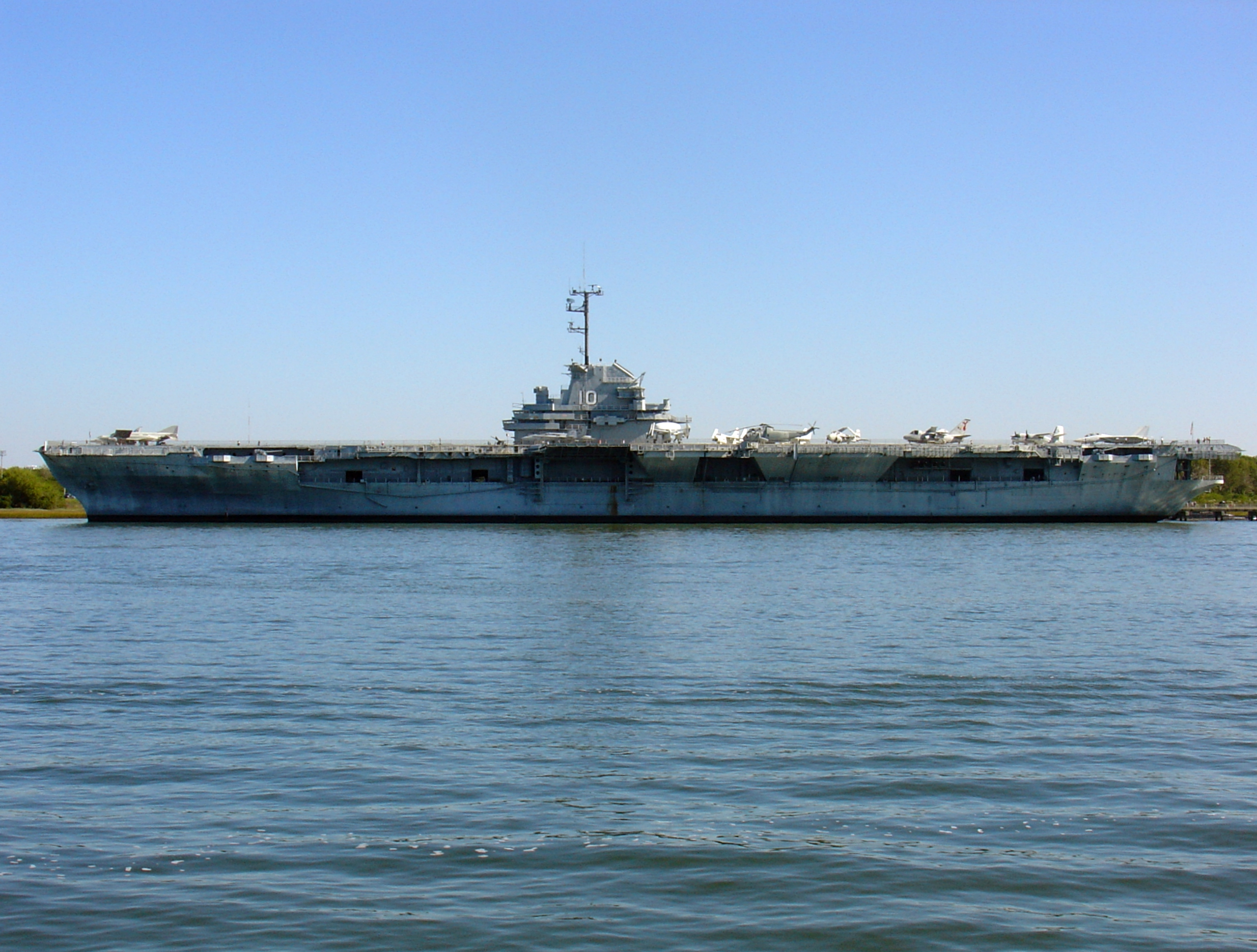
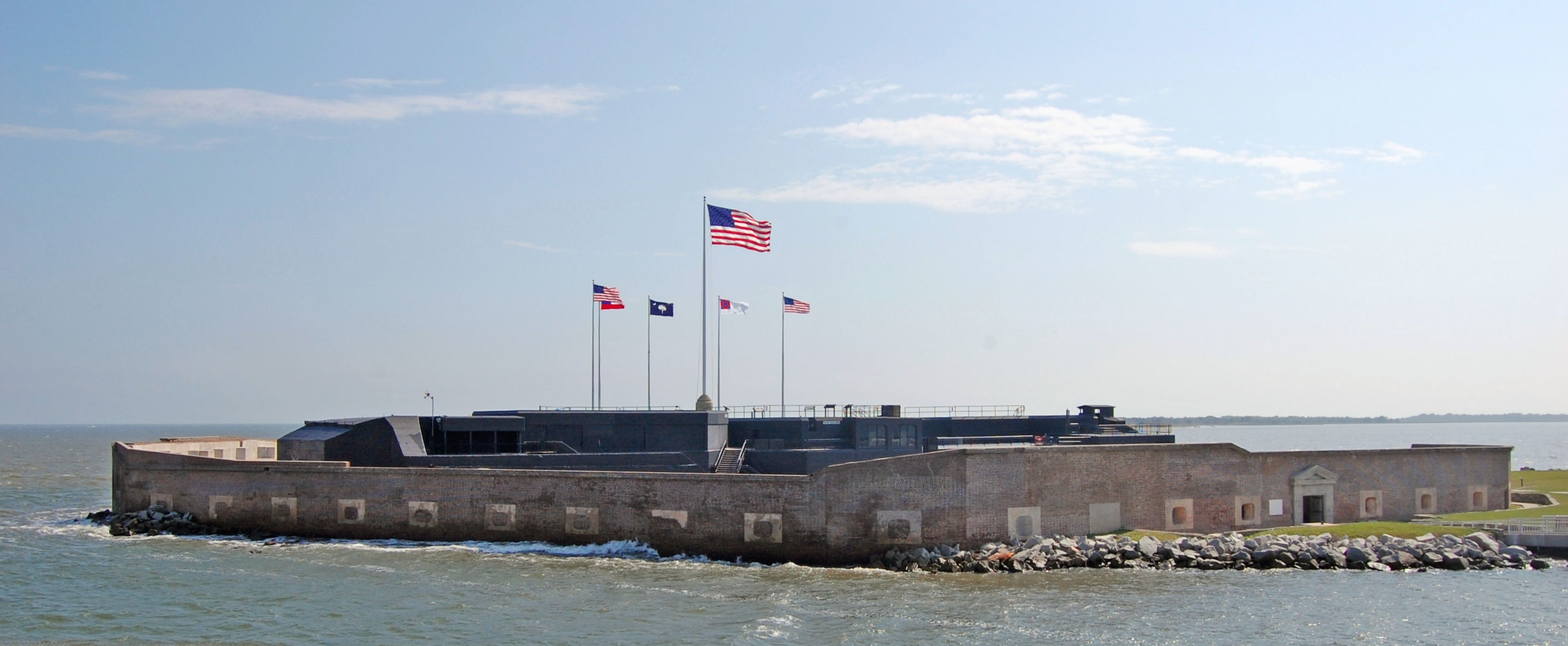
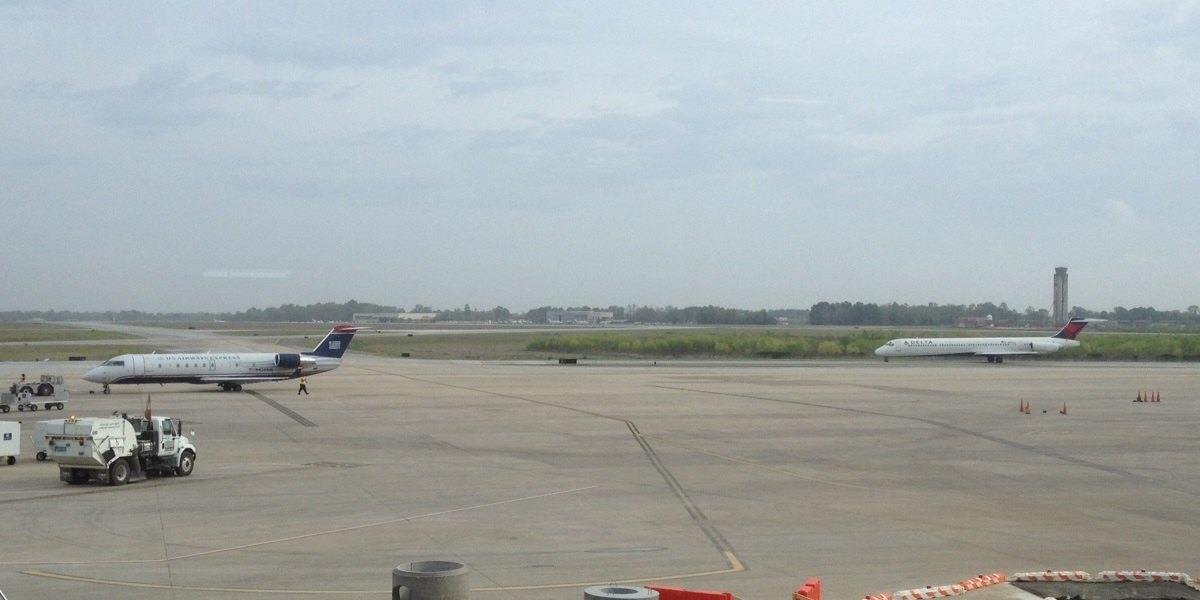
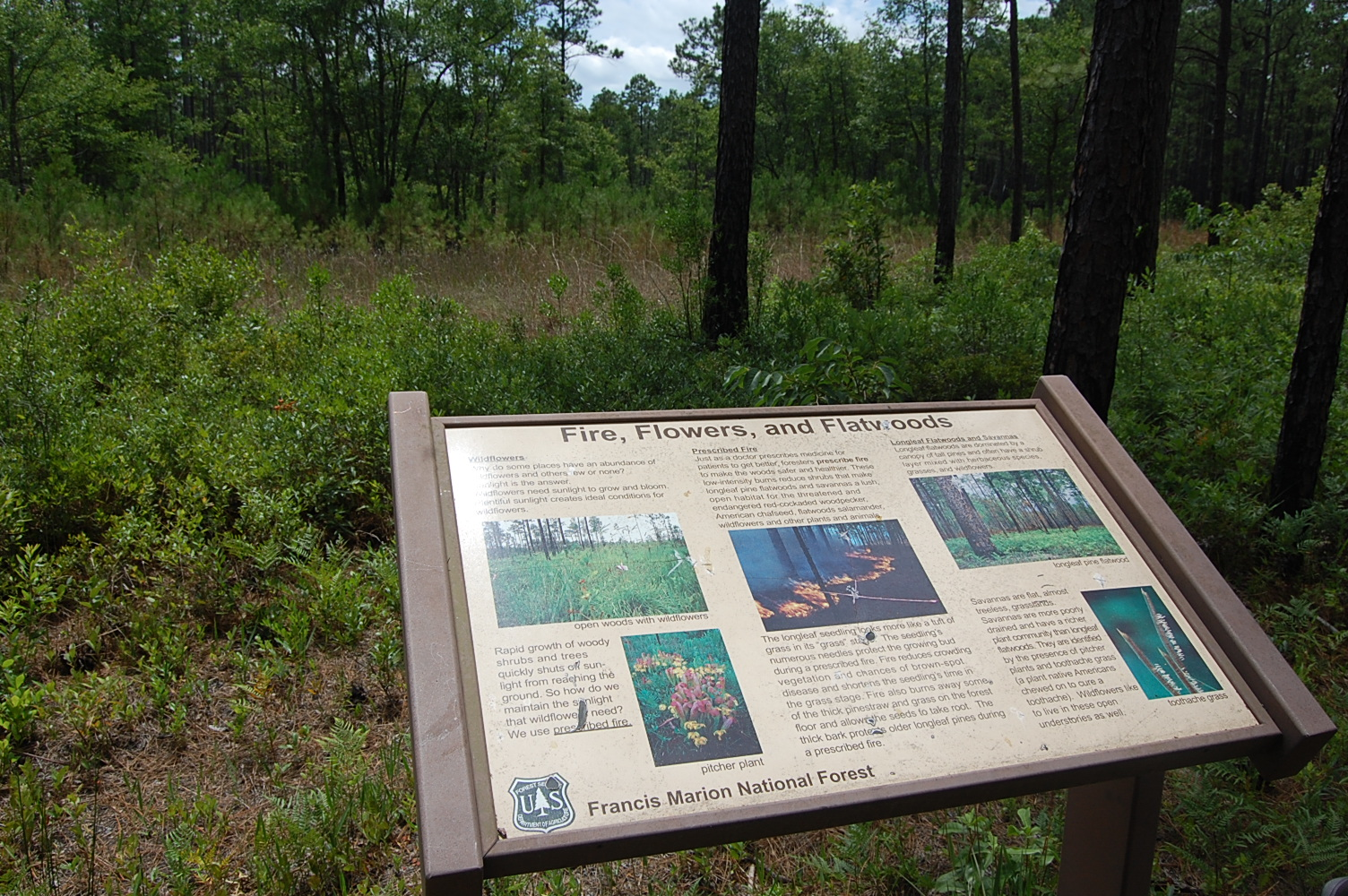
- Broad Street in Charleston Charleston County Courthouse USS Yorktown in Charleston Harbor Fort Sumter National Monument Charleston International Airport Francis Marion National Forest

- Seal Logo

- Location within the U.S. state of South Carolina
- Interactive map of Charleston County, South Carolina
- Coordinates: 32.80°N 79.94°W
- Country: United States
- State: South Carolina
- Founded: January 1, 1800
- Named for: King Charles II
- Seat: Charleston
- Largest community: Charleston

Area
  - Total: 1,357.99 sq mi (3,517.2 km^{2})
  - Land: 917.98 sq mi (2,377.6 km^{2})
  - Water: 440.01 sq mi (1,139.6 km^{2}) 32.40%

Population (2020)
  - Total: 408,235
  - Estimate (2025): 436,200 ▲
  - Density: 444.71/sq mi (171.70/km^{2})
- Time zone: UTC−5 (Eastern)
  - Summer (DST): UTC−4 (EDT)
- Congressional districts: 1st, 6th
- Website: www.charlestoncounty.gov

Charleston County is located in the U.S. state of South Carolina along the Atlantic coast. As of the 2020 census, the population was 408,235, making it the third-most populous county in South Carolina (behind Greenville and Richland counties). Its county seat is Charleston. It is also the largest county in the state by total area, although Horry County has a larger land area. The county was created in 1800 by an act of the South Carolina State Legislature. Charleston County is included in the Charleston, South Carolina metropolitan area. It is in the Lowcountry region of South Carolina.

== History ==
Charleston County was chartered in 1785 but was quickly dissolved after disputes by the residents about governance. The county was later redrawn in 1798 with the boundary lines taking effect on January 1, 1800. The county seat and largest city in both the county and state is Charleston. Both the county and town was named after King Charles II.

== Geography ==
According to the U.S. Census Bureau, the county has a total area of 1,357.99 square miles (3,517.2 km^{2}), of which 917.98 square miles (2,377.6 km^{2}) is land and 440.01 square miles (1,139.6 km^{2}) (32.40%) is water. It is the largest county in South Carolina by total land and water area.

=== National protected areas ===
- Cape Romain National Wildlife Refuge
- Charles Pinckney National Historic Site
- Ernest F. Hollings ACE Basin National Wildlife Refuge (part)
- Fort Sumter and Fort Moultrie National Historical Park
- Francis Marion National Forest (part)
- Little Wambaw Swamp Wilderness
- Wambaw Creek Wilderness (part)
- Wambaw Swamp Wilderness

=== State and local protected areas/sites ===
- Angel Oak Tree
- Bird Key - Stono Seabird Sanctuary
- Boone Hall Plantation & Gardens
- Botany Bay Plantation Heritage Preserve/Wildlife Management Area
- Buzzard Island Heritage Preserve
- Capers Island Heritage Preserve
- Crab Bank Seabird Sanctuary
- Charles Towne Landing State Historic Site
- Deveaux Bank Seabird Sanctuary
- Dungannon Plantation Heritage Preserve/Wildlife Management Area
- Edisto Beach State Park
- Folly Beach County Park
- Fort Lamar Heritage Preserve
- Hampton Plantation State Historic Site
- James Island County Park
- Lighthouse Inlet Heritage Preserve
- Magnolia Plantation and Gardens
- Morris Island Lighthouse
- North Charleston Wannamaker County Park
- Santee Coastal Reserve Wildlife Management Area
- Stono River County Park
- Waterfront Park

=== Major water bodies ===
- Ashley River
- Atlantic Ocean (North Atlantic Ocean)
- Cooper River
- Intracoastal Waterway
- Kiawah River
- South Edisto River
- South Santee River
- Stono River
- Wando River

=== Adjacent counties ===
- Berkeley County – north
- Georgetown County – northeast
- Colleton County – west
- Dorchester County – northwest

=== Major highways ===
- I-26
- I-526
- I-526 BS
- US 17
- US 52
- US 52 Conn.
- US 52 Spur
- US 78
- SC 30
- SC 41
- SC 45
- SC 61
- SC 61 Conn.
- SC 162
- SC 165
- SC 171
- SC 174
- SC 517
- SC 642
- SC 700
- SC 703

=== Major infrastructure ===
- Charleston International Airport (joint civil-military airport; also home to Boeing South Carolina)
- North Charleston Station
- Port of Charleston

== Demographics ==
Historical population
Census	Pop.	Note	%±
1790	66,985		—
1800	57,480		−14.2%
1810	63,179		9.9%
1820	80,212		27.0%
1830	86,338		7.6%
1840	82,661		−4.3%
1850	72,805		−11.9%
1860	70,100		−3.7%
1870	88,863		26.8%
1880	102,800		15.7%
1890	59,903		−41.7%
1900	88,006		46.9%
1910	88,594		0.7%
1920	108,450		22.4%
1930	101,050		−6.8%
1940	121,105		19.8%
1950	164,856		36.1%
1960	216,382		31.3%
1970	247,650		14.5%
1980	276,974		11.8%
1990	295,039		6.5%
2000	309,969		5.1%
2010	350,209		13.0%
2020	408,235		16.6%
2025 (est.)	436,200	▲	6.9%
U.S. Decennial Census; 1790–1960 1900–1990; 1990–2000 2010 2020

=== Racial and ethnic composition ===
Charleston County, South Carolina – Racial and ethnic composition Note: the US Census treats Hispanic/Latino as an ethnic category. This table excludes Latinos from the racial categories and assigns them to a separate category. Hispanics/Latinos may be of any race.
Race / Ethnicity (NH = Non-Hispanic)	Pop 1980	Pop 1990	Pop 2000	Pop 2010	Pop 2020	% 1980	% 1990	% 2000	% 2010	% 2020
White alone (NH)	176,370	185,343	188,542	217,260	263,560	63.68%	62.82%	60.83%	62.04%	64.56%
Black or African American alone (NH)	94,246	102,522	106,337	103,479	91,746	34.03%	34.75%	34.31%	29.55%	22.47%
Native American or Alaska Native alone (NH)	411	644	712	838	857	0.15%	0.22%	0.23%	0.24%	0.21%
Asian alone (NH)	1,892	2,534	3,410	4,660	7,461	0.68%	0.86%	1.10%	1.33%	1.83%
Native Hawaiian or Pacific Islander alone (NH)	x	x	142	246	319	x	x	0.05%	0.07%	0.08%
Other race alone (NH)	350	123	339	471	1,533	0.13%	0.04%	0.11%	0.13%	0.38%
Mixed race or Multiracial (NH)	x	x	3,053	4,378	13,479	x	x	0.98%	1.25%	3.30%
Hispanic or Latino (any race)	3,705	3,873	7,434	18,877	29,280	1.34%	1.31%	2.40%	5.39%	7.17%
Total	276,974	295,039	309,969	350,209	408,235	100.00%	100.00%	100.00%	100.00%	100.00%

=== 2020 census ===
As of the 2020 census, there were 408,235 people, 173,572 households, and 95,785 families residing in the county.

The median age was 38.3 years. 19.7% of residents were under the age of 18 and 17.5% of residents were 65 years of age or older. For every 100 females there were 94.0 males, and for every 100 females age 18 and over there were 91.6 males age 18 and over.

The racial makeup of the county was 65.8% White, 22.7% Black or African American, 0.4% American Indian and Alaska Native, 1.9% Asian, 0.1% Native Hawaiian and Pacific Islander, 3.8% from some other race, and 5.4% from two or more races. Hispanic or Latino residents of any race comprised 7.2% of the population.

90.9% of residents lived in urban areas, while 9.1% lived in rural areas.

Among the 173,572 households in the county, 25.4% had children under the age of 18 living with them and 31.3% had a female householder with no spouse or partner present. About 31.0% of all households were made up of individuals and 10.5% had someone living alone who was 65 years of age or older. There were 201,884 housing units, of which 14.0% were vacant; 60.7% of occupied units were owner-occupied and 39.3% were renter-occupied. The homeowner vacancy rate was 1.8% and the rental vacancy rate was 11.8%.

=== 2010 census ===
At the 2010 census, there were 350,209 people, 144,309 households, and 85,692 families residing in the county. The population density was 382.3 inhabitants per square mile (147.6/km^{2}). There were 169,984 housing units at an average density of 185.6 units per square mile (71.7 units/km^{2}). The racial makeup of the county was 64.2% white, 29.8% black or African American, 1.3% Asian, 0.3% American Indian, 0.1% Pacific islander, 2.7% from other races, and 1.6% from two or more races. Those of Hispanic or Latino origin made up 5.4% of the population. In terms of claimed ancestry, 11.3% were German, 11.0% were English, 10.2% were Irish, and 9.8% were American.

Of the 144,309 households, 27.8% had children under the age of 18 living with them, 40.5% were married couples living together, 14.7% had a female householder with no husband present, 40.6% were non-families, and 30.1% of all households were made up of individuals. The average household size was 2.36 and the average family size was 2.96. The median age was 35.9 years.

The median income for a household in the county was $48,433 and the median income for a family was $61,525. Males had a median income of $42,569 versus $34,195 for females. The per capita income for the county was $29,401. About 11.5% of families and 16.5% of the population were below the poverty line, including 24.5% of those under age 18 and 10.8% of those age 65 or over.

=== 2000 census ===
At the 2000 census, there were 309,969 people, 143,326 households, and 97,448 families residing in the county. The population density was 338 people per square mile (131 people/km^{2}). There were 141,031 housing units at an average density of 154 units per square mile (59 units/km^{2}). The racial makeup of the county was 61.9% White, 34.5% Black or African American, 0.26% Native American, 1.12% Asian, 0.06% Pacific Islander, 0.99% from other races, and 1.16% from two or more races. 2.40% of the population were Hispanic or Latino of any race. 9.6% were of American, 9.5% English, 9.1% German and 7.6% Irish ancestry.

There were 123,326 households, out of which 28.70% had children under the age of 18 living with them, 43.20% were married couples living together, 15.90% had a female householder with no husband present, and 37.20% were non-families. 28.30% of all households were made up of individuals, and 8.10% had someone living alone who was 65 years of age or older. The average household size was 2.42 and the average family size was 3.01.

In the county, the age distribution of the population shows 23.70% under the age of 18, 12.00% from 18 to 24, 30.30% from 25 to 44, 22.00% from 45 to 64, and 11.90% who were 65 years of age or older. The median age was 34 years. For every 100 females, there were 93.50 males. For every 100 females age 18 and over, there were 90.50 males.

The median income for a household in the county is $37,810, and the median income for a family was $47,139. Males had a median income of $32,681 versus $25,530 for females. The per capita income for the county was $21,393. About 12.40% of families and 16.40% of the population were below the poverty line, including 22.90% of those under age 18 and 12.70% of those age 65 or over.

In the 2000 census, the county population was classified as about 86% urban. The Charleston-North Charleston Metropolitan Statistical Area includes the populations of Charleston, Berkeley, and Dorchester counties.

== Law and government ==
From 1895 to 1973, when the state constitution was amended to provide for home rule in the counties, the counties had limited powers, under what was called "county purpose doctrine." Essentially the General Assembly governed the counties through their state legislative delegations and, with one state senator per county, the state senator was particularly powerful. In the 1940s, Charleston County adopted a council-manager form of county government to better handle its needs. In 1975 the state's Home Rule Act established a larger role for the county governments.

Charleston County has a large geographic area represented by a nine-member county council. From the turn of the 20th century into the 1960s, most African Americans were excluded from voting by the state's disenfranchising constitution and discriminatory practices. This gradually changed after passage of the federal Voting Rights Act of 1965.

Since 1969, members of the county commission have been elected in a modified at-large system for nine seats from four residency districts. Elections are held every two years for staggered four-year terms. Three Council seats are reserved for residents of the City of Charleston, three for residents of North Charleston, two for residents of West Ashley, and one for residents of East Cooper. The council elects a chairman from its members for a limited term of two years, but chairs can be re-elected.

Charleston County was "one of only three counties in South Carolina to elect its entire county council at-large. It was "the only county with a majority white population to do so." At-large positions favor candidates who can attract a majority of the votes, reducing representation from smaller portions of the population, or geographic areas.

In 1989 county residents proposed a referendum to change representation on the county council to election from single-member districts, which would have provided more opportunity for the sizable minority to elect candidates of their choice. This proposal was narrowly defeated in what both the county and the US government later defined as a racially polarized election. It was supported by 98% of the African-American minority voters; 75% of the white-majority voters rejected the referendum. In practice, the at-large system results in the dilution of votes of the significant minority of African-American voters, who comprise more than one-third of the electorate. In practice, the minority voters have been unable to elect a candidate of their choice in all but a few elections in the three decades since the system was established.

In January 2001, the US Department of Justice filed suit against the county government for racial discrimination based on the at-large system, which the suit contended violates Sec.2 of the Voting Rights Act of 1965 by diluting voting power. The department had tried to negotiate with the county over changes in November 2000. Four voters independently filed suit as plaintiffs against the county on the same basis, and the District Court combined the cases. Justice officials noted that the at-large seats dilute the voting strength of the African-American minority in the county, who in 2000 comprised 34.5% of the population. In all but a few cases over three decades, they have been unable to elect candidates of their choice to the county commission. Whites (European Americans) comprise 61.9 percent of the population in the county. Since the late 20th century, the white majority has elected Republican Party candidates.

The DOJ officials noted that the voting preference issue is not just a question of ethnicity; voters in black precincts in the county had rejected a Republican African American as a candidate for the council; they supported the Democratic at-large candidate. The suit noted that historically, black and white precincts in Charleston County have consistently supported different candidates for the council. It noted that, because of the white majority and the large geographic area, which increases costs for campaigning, "white bloc voting usually results in the defeat of candidates who are preferred by black voters." DOJ noted that blacks lived in compact areas of the county, were cohesive in voting, and could comprise the majority in three districts if the county seats were apportioned as nine single-member districts. They could vote and gain representation proportional to their part of the citizenry.

In United States v. Charleston County, SC (March 2003), the District Court ruled that Charleston County improperly diluted the voting strength of African-American voters "by maintaining an at-large voting system in a manner which violated Section 2." It enjoined the county from using that system, noting that the "Order is radically not a condemnation of the citizenry of Charleston County but rather a recognition that the specific bulwark of an at-large system, in twisted concert with the particular geographic and historical realities of this County, unlawfully and institutionally inhibit a community of voters in Charleston County from equal access to the electoral process."

The county appealed. In July 2003, the 4th Circuit Appeals Court found that historic voting in the county was racially polarized and that minority candidates had mostly not been successful in seeking office, two conditions that are recognized under the law as showing discriminatory effects of the voting system in the county. As of July of that year, the 4th Circuit Court affirmed the District Court's ruling, and on April 29, 2004, issued its written decision affirming the District Court. Based on historical and economic analysis, the courts found that race was a more important issue than partisanship in influencing the outcome of the elections. The county appealed to the US Supreme Court, and a certiorari was denied in November 2004.

The County Council system was changed in 2004 to elect individuals from nine single-member districts, with members serving four-year staggered terms. As of January 2015, elected members of the council include 4 White Republicans, 2 White Democrats and 3 African-American Democrats. Republican Elliott Summey was elected by council members as chairman, replacing Democrat Teddie Pryor, who had served for six years. Summey had served as his vice-chair for five years. Pryor was first elected to the council in 2004. Summey was first elected in 2008.

Charleston County is split between South Carolina's 1st congressional district, represented by Republican Nancy Mace, and South Carolina's 6th congressional district, represented by Democrat Jim Clyburn.

=== Politics ===
A largely urban area containing the cities of Charleston and North Charleston, Charleston County is one of the more Democratic-leaning counties in what is otherwise a solidly red state. In 2020, it voted for Joe Biden by nearly 13 points, the best Democratic performance in the county since 1944 and over 20 points more Democratic than the state as a whole. In 2024, Charleston County shifted towards Donald Trump in tandem with the rest of South Carolina, with Kamala Harris only winning the county by roughly 5.7 points, although it still voted to the left of the state by a similar margin. No Republican presidential candidate has won the county in over two decades as of 2025.

United States presidential election results for Charleston County, South Carolina
Year	Republican		Democratic		Third party(ies)	
Year	No.	%	No.	%	No.	%
1892	430	21.55%	1,564	78.40%	1	0.05%
1896	1,262	36.36%	1,660	47.82%	549	15.82%
1900	271	13.55%	1,729	86.45%	0	0.00%
1904	195	10.03%	1,750	89.97%	0	0.00%
1908	347	15.82%	1,814	82.68%	33	1.50%
1912	34	1.75%	1,760	90.35%	154	7.91%
1916	129	6.26%	1,929	93.64%	2	0.10%
1920	373	11.25%	2,929	88.36%	13	0.39%
1924	361	11.94%	2,554	84.49%	108	3.57%
1928	1,759	28.95%	4,298	70.75%	18	0.30%
1932	451	7.73%	5,351	91.74%	31	0.53%
1936	417	4.95%	8,015	95.05%	0	0.00%
1940	1,372	14.42%	8,145	85.58%	0	0.00%
1944	1,184	13.80%	6,260	72.95%	1,137	13.25%
1948	562	4.05%	2,660	19.15%	10,671	76.81%
1952	20,087	66.85%	9,959	33.15%	0	0.00%
1956	7,487	29.86%	4,028	16.07%	13,558	54.07%
1960	21,223	63.86%	12,010	36.14%	0	0.00%
1964	32,509	69.06%	14,564	30.94%	0	0.00%
1968	24,282	43.45%	18,343	32.83%	13,255	23.72%
1972	39,863	68.79%	16,855	29.09%	1,229	2.12%
1976	34,010	49.18%	34,328	49.64%	817	1.18%
1980	44,111	55.13%	32,727	40.90%	3,174	3.97%
1984	53,779	63.83%	29,481	34.99%	1,000	1.19%
1988	49,149	59.28%	32,977	39.77%	790	0.95%
1992	47,403	48.00%	40,095	40.60%	11,251	11.39%
1996	48,675	50.34%	43,571	45.06%	4,442	4.59%
2000	58,229	52.23%	49,520	44.42%	3,727	3.34%
2004	70,297	51.57%	63,758	46.77%	2,261	1.66%
2008	69,822	45.21%	82,698	53.55%	1,914	1.24%
2012	77,629	48.01%	81,487	50.39%	2,591	1.60%
2016	75,443	42.78%	89,299	50.64%	11,603	6.58%
2020	93,297	42.63%	121,485	55.51%	4,075	1.86%
2024	99,265	46.27%	111,427	51.94%	3,829	1.78%

=== Law enforcement ===
Sheriff Kristin Graziano was elected in 2020, becoming the first woman and first openly gay person to serve as a sheriff in South Carolina. She was later defeated in 2024 by Carl Ritchie.

== Emergency services ==
=== Volunteer Rescue Squad ===
The Volunteer Rescue Squad consists of over 50 members and a physician. Members are certified in a variety of emergency skills, and many members are first responders.

=== EMS and local hospitals ===
Emergency medical services (EMS) for the city are provided by Charleston County Emergency Medical Services (CCEMS) & Berkeley County Emergency Medical Services (BCEMS). The city is served by the EMS and 911 services of both Charleston and Berkeley counties since the city is part of both counties.

Charleston is the primary medical center for the eastern portion of the state. The city has several major hospitals located in the downtown area: Medical University of South Carolina Medical Center (MUSC), Ralph H. Johnson VA Medical Center, and Roper Hospital. MUSC is the state's first school of medicine, the largest medical university in the state, and the sixth-oldest continually operating school of medicine in the United States. The downtown medical district is experiencing rapid growth of biotechnology and medical research industries coupled with substantial expansions of all the major hospitals. Additionally, more expansions are planned or underway at another major hospital located in the West Ashley portion of the city: Bon Secours-St Francis Xavier Hospital. The Trident Medical Center, located in North Charleston, and East Cooper Medical Center, located in Mount Pleasant, also serve the needs of residents of the city of Charleston.

== Economy ==
In 2022, the GDP of Charleston County was $41 billion (approx. $100,607 per capital). In chained 2017 dollars, its real GDP was $35.1 billion (about $85,956 per capita). From 2022 through 2024, its unemployment rate has fluctuated between 2-3.3%.

As of April 2024, some of the largest employers within the county include Boeing, Booz Allen Hamilton, Charleston County School District, College of Charleston, CVS Pharmacy, Harris Teeter, Medical University of South Carolina, Mercedes-Benz Group, Publix, United States Department of Defense, United States Department of Veterans Affairs, and Walmart.

Employment and Wage Statistics by Industry in Charleston County, South Carolina
Industry	Employment Counts	Employment Percentage (%)	Average Annual Wage ($)
Accommodation and Food Services	36,926	13.4	32,240
Administrative and Support and Waste Management and Remediation Services	19,902	7.2	44,512
Agriculture, Forestry, Fishing and Hunting	240	0.1	42,796
Arts, Entertainment, and Recreation	6,103	2.2	30,992
Construction	15,078	5.5	75,452
Educational Services	19,571	7.1	56,680
Finance and Insurance	8,134	3.0	106,288
Health Care and Social Assistance	43,511	15.8	65,884
Information	4,417	1.6	91,468
Management of Companies and Enterprises	2,305	0.8	89,700
Manufacturing	17,164	6.2	88,452
Mining, Quarrying, and Oil and Gas Extraction	47	0.0	90,948
Other Services (except Public Administration)	7,563	2.7	50,752
Professional, Scientific, and Technical Services	21,576	7.8	93,756
Public Administration	16,347	5.9	74,880
Real Estate and Rental and Leasing	6,670	2.4	66,508
Retail Trade	29,556	10.7	42,484
Transportation and Warehousing	11,760	4.3	59,280
Utilities	1,315	0.5	79,612
Wholesale Trade	7,395	2.7	81,588
Total	275,580	100.0%	62,132

== Education ==
Charleston County School District is the school district for the entire county.

== Recreation ==
The Charleston County Park and Recreation Commission (CCPRC) operates numerous facilities within Charleston County.

Beach parks

- Kiawah Beachwalker County Park, Kiawah Island, South Carolina
- Isle of Palms County Park, Isle of Palms, South Carolina
- Folly Beach County Park, Folly Beach, South Carolina

Fishing piers

- Folly Beach Fishing Pier, Folly Beach, South Carolina
- Mt. Pleasant Pier, Mount Pleasant, South Carolina

Marinas and boat landings

- Cooper River Marina
- Multiple county-wide boat landings

Day parks

- Palmetto Islands County Park, Mount Pleasant, South Carolina
- Caw Caw Nature and History Interpretive Center, Ravenel, South Carolina
- North Charleston Wannamaker County Park, North Charleston, South Carolina
- Mullet Hall Equestrian Center, Johns Island, South Carolina
- James Island County Park, Charleston, South Carolina
- Old Towne Creek County Park, West Ashley, Charleston, South Carolina

Water parks

- Splash Island at Palmetto Islands County Park
- Splash Zone at James Island County Park
- Whirlin' Waters at North Charleston Wannamaker County Park

Off-leash dog parks are offered at James Island, Palmetto Islands, and North Charleston Wannamaker County Park.

James Island County Park, approximately 11 minutes by car from downtown Charleston, features a 50-foot climbing wall and bouldering cave; cabin, RV, and tent camping facilities; rental facilities, fishing dock, challenge course, kayaking programs, summer camps, paved trails, and many special events such as the Lowcountry Cajun Festival (usually the first weekend in April), East Coast Canoe and Kayak Festival (3rd weekend in April), Holiday Festival of Lights (mid-November through the first of the year), and the summer outdoor reggae concerts.

== Communities ==
=== Communities by Population ranking ===
The incorporated cities and towns of the county as well as the census-designated places are listed below by population. The population ranking is based on the 2020 census of Charleston County.

† = county seat

Rank	Name	Type	Population (2020 census)
1	† Charleston	City	150,227
2	North Charleston	City	114,852
3	Mount Pleasant	Town	90,801
4	Summerville	Town	50,915
5	Ladson	CDP	15,550
6	James Island	Town	11,621
7	Hollywood	Town	5,339
8	Isle of Palms	City	4,347
9	Ravenel	Town	2,542
10	Folly Beach	City	2,078
11	Seabrook Island	Town	2,050
12	Kiawah Island	Town	2,013
13	Sullivan's Island	Town	1,891
14	Awendaw	Town	1,399
15	Meggett	Town	1,390
16	Lincolnville	Town	1,147
17	McClellanville	Town	605
18	Adams Run	CDP	421
19	Rockville	Town	141

=== Unincorporated communities ===
- Ashley River
- Barrelville
- Edisto Island
- Johns Island

=== Former communities ===
- Atlanticville
- Clementia

=== Districts ===
- Awendaw-McClellanville Consolidated Fire District, made up of unincorporated parts of Northern Charleston County, the Town of Awendaw, and the Town of McClellanville.
- James Island Public Service District, made up of unincorporated parts of the island.
- North Charleston Public Service District, responsible for sewer lines and treatment in the City of North Charleston.
- St. John's Fire District, serving Kiawah Island, Seabrook Island, unincorporated John's Island, and Wadmalaw Island.
- Saint Andrews Public Service District, made up of unincorporated parts of West Ashley.
- St. Pauls Fire District, made up of all of the Towns of Hollywood, Ravenel, Meggett and unincorporated parts of the southern end of Charleston County.
- West Ashley

== Notable people ==
- Pernessa C. Seele (born 1954), immunologist, founder and CEO of the Balm in Gilead, Inc., an international organization based in Harlem, New York

== See also ==
- List of counties in South Carolina
- National Register of Historic Places listings in Charleston County, South Carolina
