= Francis Marion National Forest =

U.S. national forest in South Carolina

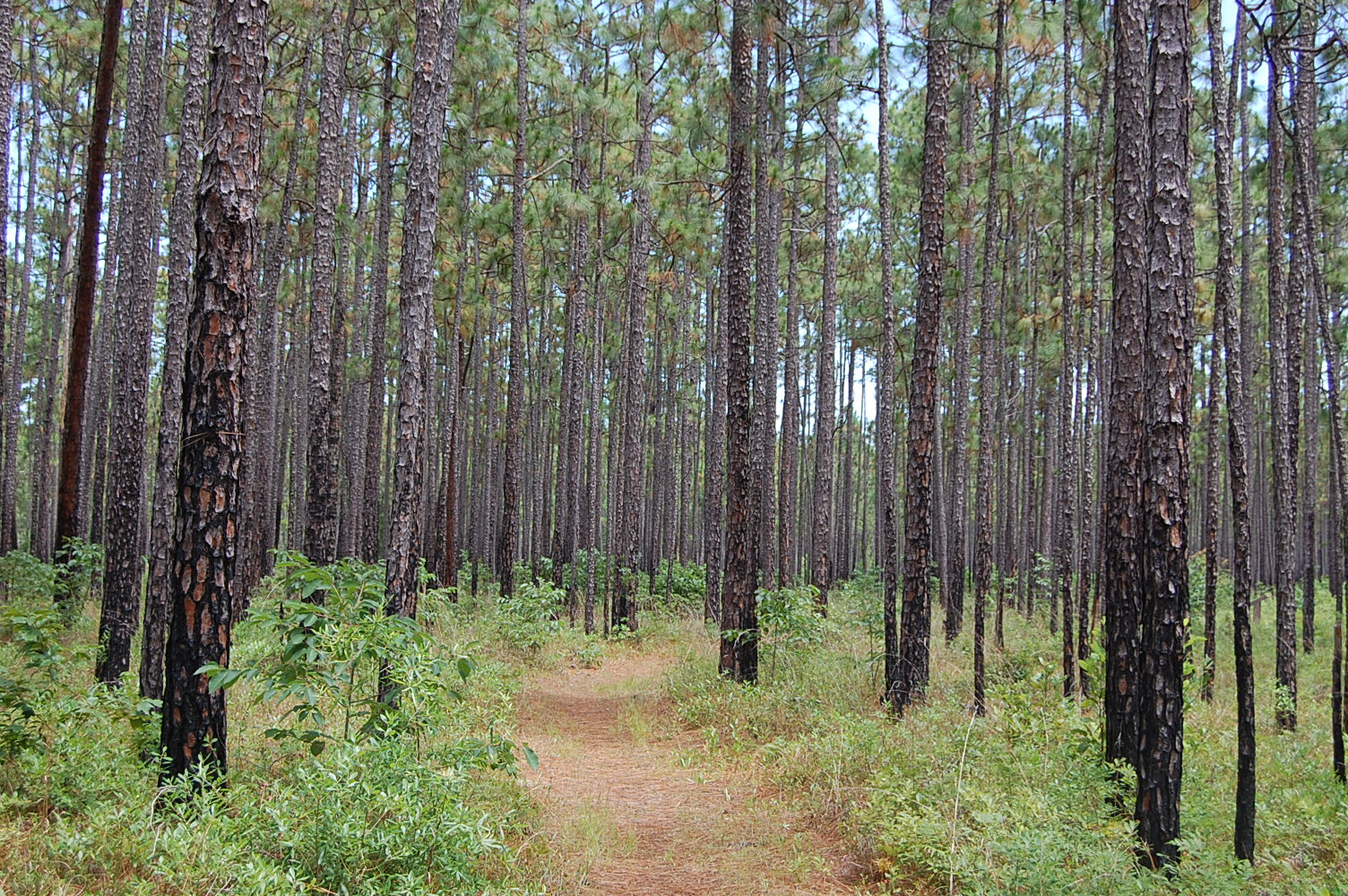
- Palmetto Trail

- Location within the United States
- Location: South Carolina, United States
- Nearest city: Charleston, SC
- Coordinates: 33.166667°N 79.666667°W
- Area: 263,904 acres (1,067.98 km^{2})
- Max. elevation: 80 ft. (24 m), 33.3912, -79.9054
- Established: July 10, 1936
- Governing body: U.S. Forest Service
- Website: Francis Marion and Sumter National Forests

The Francis Marion National Forest is located north of Charleston, South Carolina. It is named for revolutionary war hero Francis Marion, who was known to the British as the Swamp Fox. It lies entirely within the Middle Atlantic coastal forests ecoregion. The forest is also entirely in the Subtropical coniferous forest.

This National Forest is contained entirely in the counties of Charleston and Berkeley and is 263,904 acres (1,070 km^{2}) in size. The forest is near the towns of Awendaw, Huger, Jamestown, and McClellanville. Charleston provides emergency services to the southeastern portions of the forest. Forest headquarters are located in Columbia, together with those of Sumter National Forest. Thelocal ranger district office is located in Huger.

In 1989, the forest was nearly destroyed by Hurricane Hugo; only the young growth survived the storm and its aftermath. Today, most trees in the forest do not predate this hurricane.

The forest is a multiple use area. Recreation opportunities include campsites, rifle ranges, boat ramps, and several trails for hiking, horseback riding, mountain biking, including the Palmetto Trail, as well as off-road motorcycling and ATV riding specifically at the Wambaw Cycle Trailhead. (OHV) The Forest Service also administers wilderness areas, experimental forests, timber production, and protection and management of wildlife and the watershed.

== Wilderness areas ==
There are four officially designated wilderness areas lying within Francis Marion National Forest that are part of the National Wilderness Preservation System.

- Hell Hole Bay Wilderness
- Little Wambaw Swamp Wilderness
- Wambaw Creek Wilderness
- Wambaw Swamp Wilderness
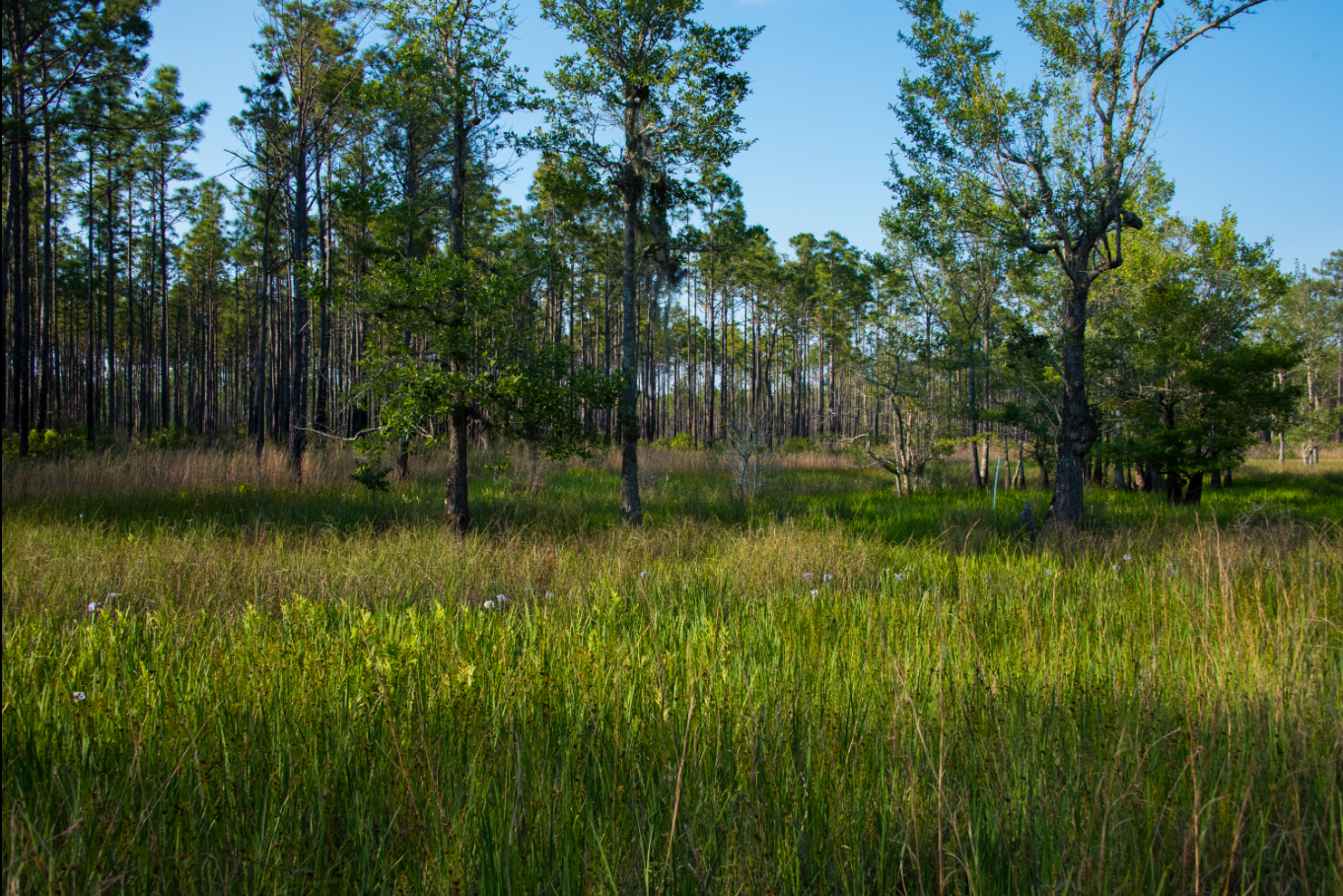
A temporarily flooded wetland in the forest's longleaf pine ecosystem in 2019.

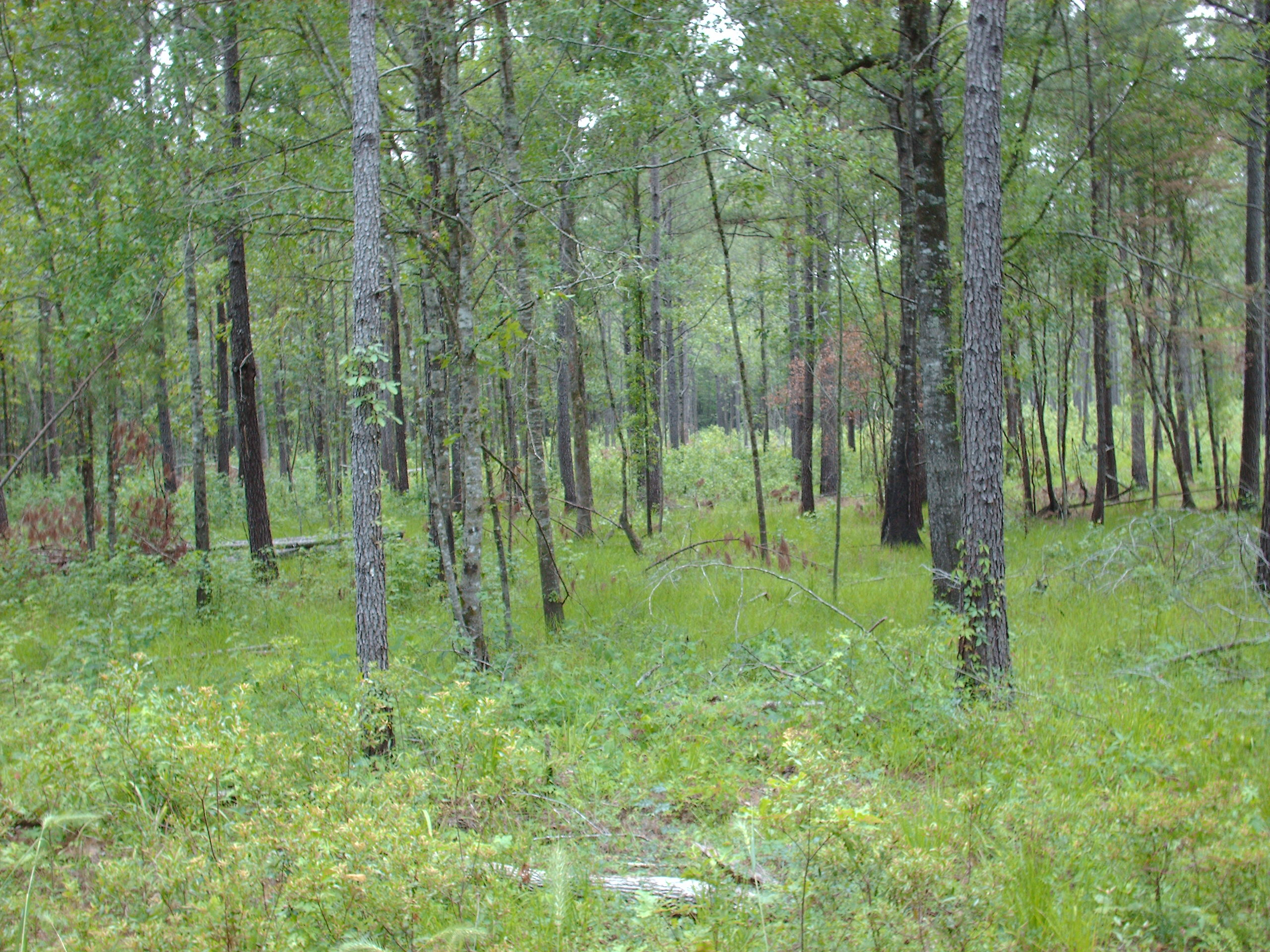
An image of the forest next to the Santee River in Berkeley County.

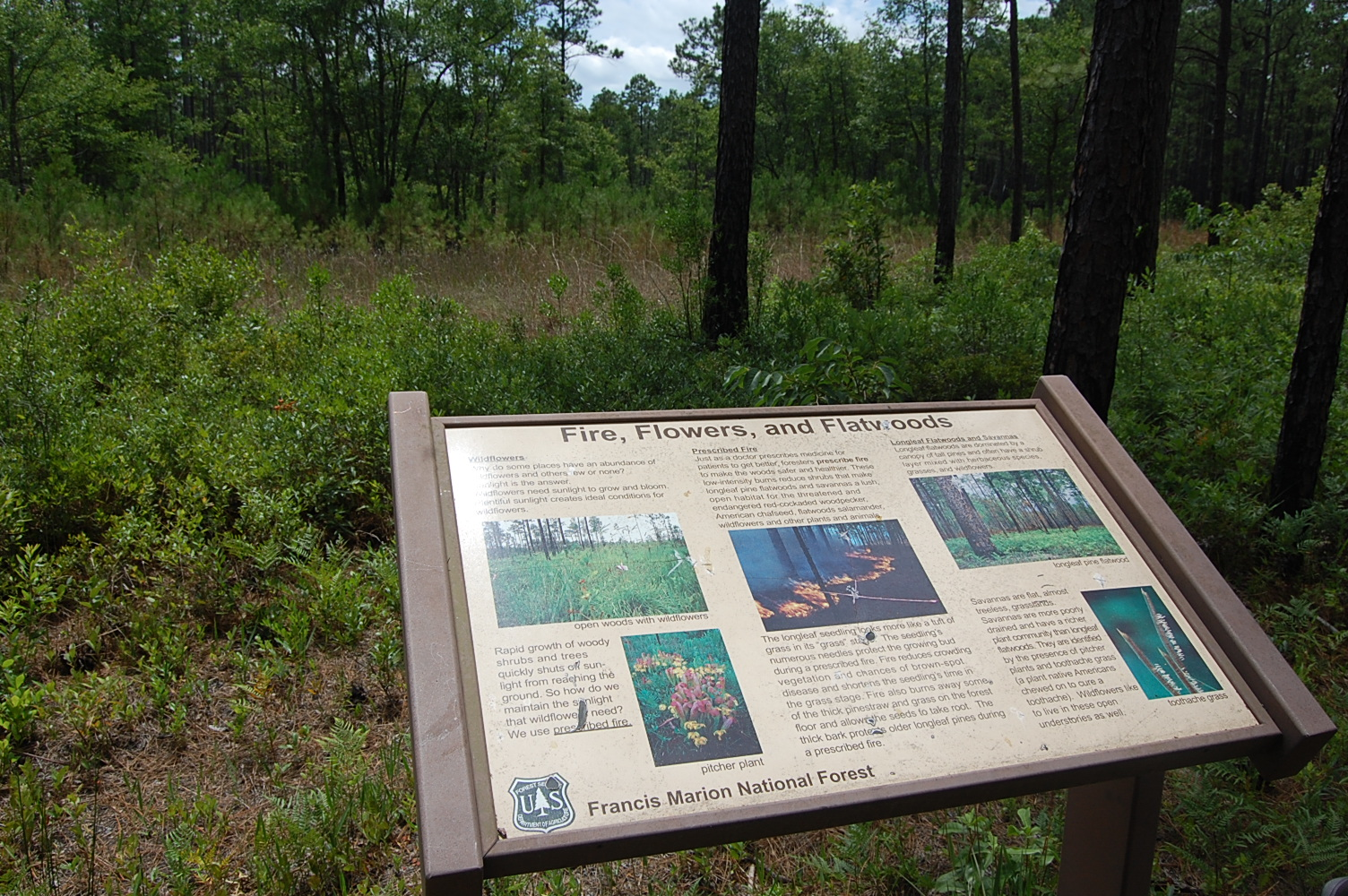
Information on Palmetto Trail.

== See also ==
- List of national forests of the United States

== Bibliography ==
- Jerman, Patricia (2000). South Carolina Nature Viewing Guide. Charleston: University of South Carolina Press.
- (1941). South Carolina: A Guide to the Palmetto State. New York: Oxford University Press.
