= Capers Island, South Carolina =

American barrier island on the Atlantic coast

Capers Island
- Location within South Carolina

Geography
- Location: Atlantic Ocean
- Coordinates: 32.852°N 79.697°W
- Area: 1.66 sq mi (4.3 km^{2})
- Length: 3.11 mi (5.01 km)
- Width: .53 mi (0.85 km)

Administration
- United States
- State: South Carolina
- County: Charleston County

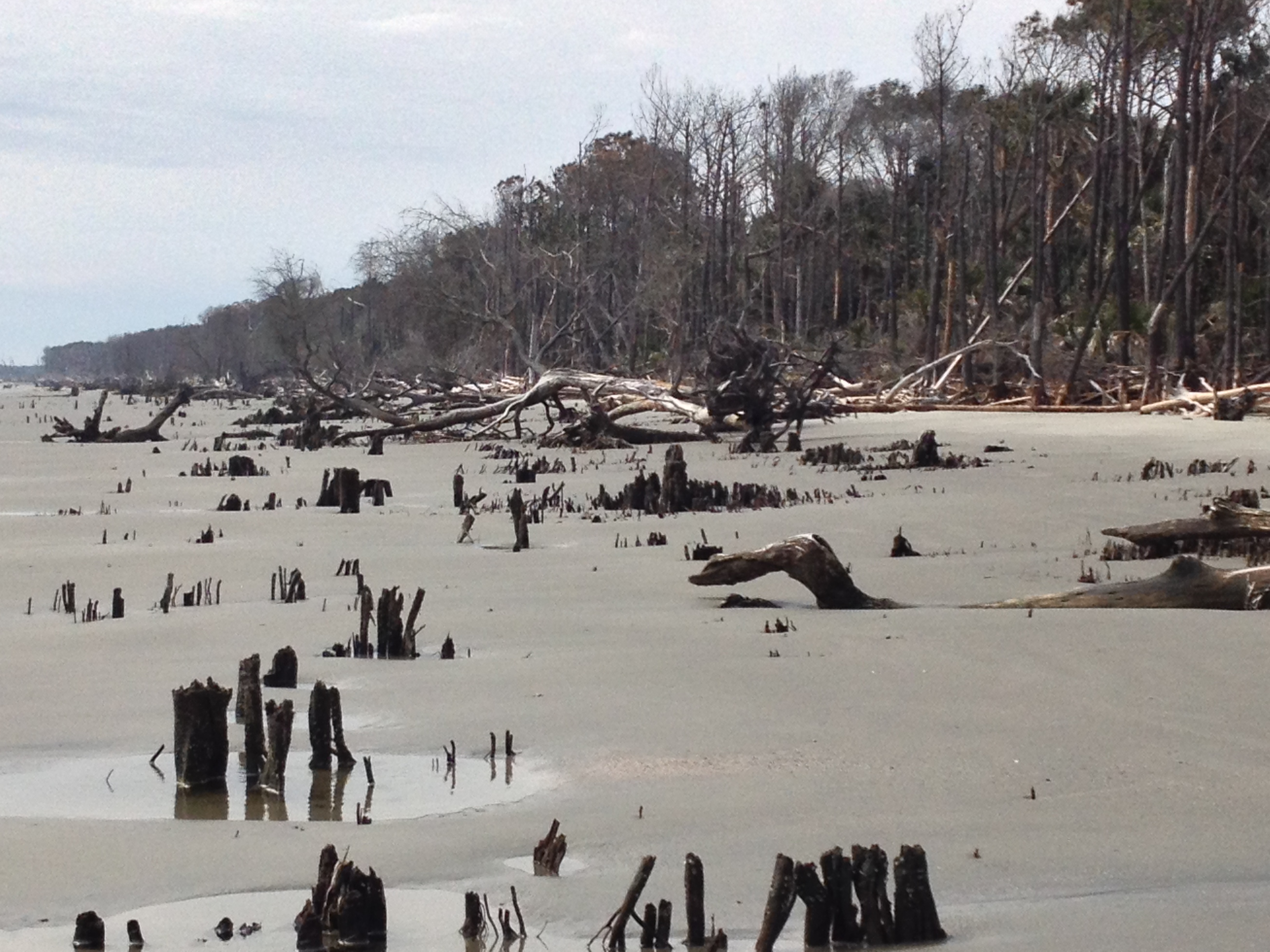
View Southwest down the beach on Capers Island

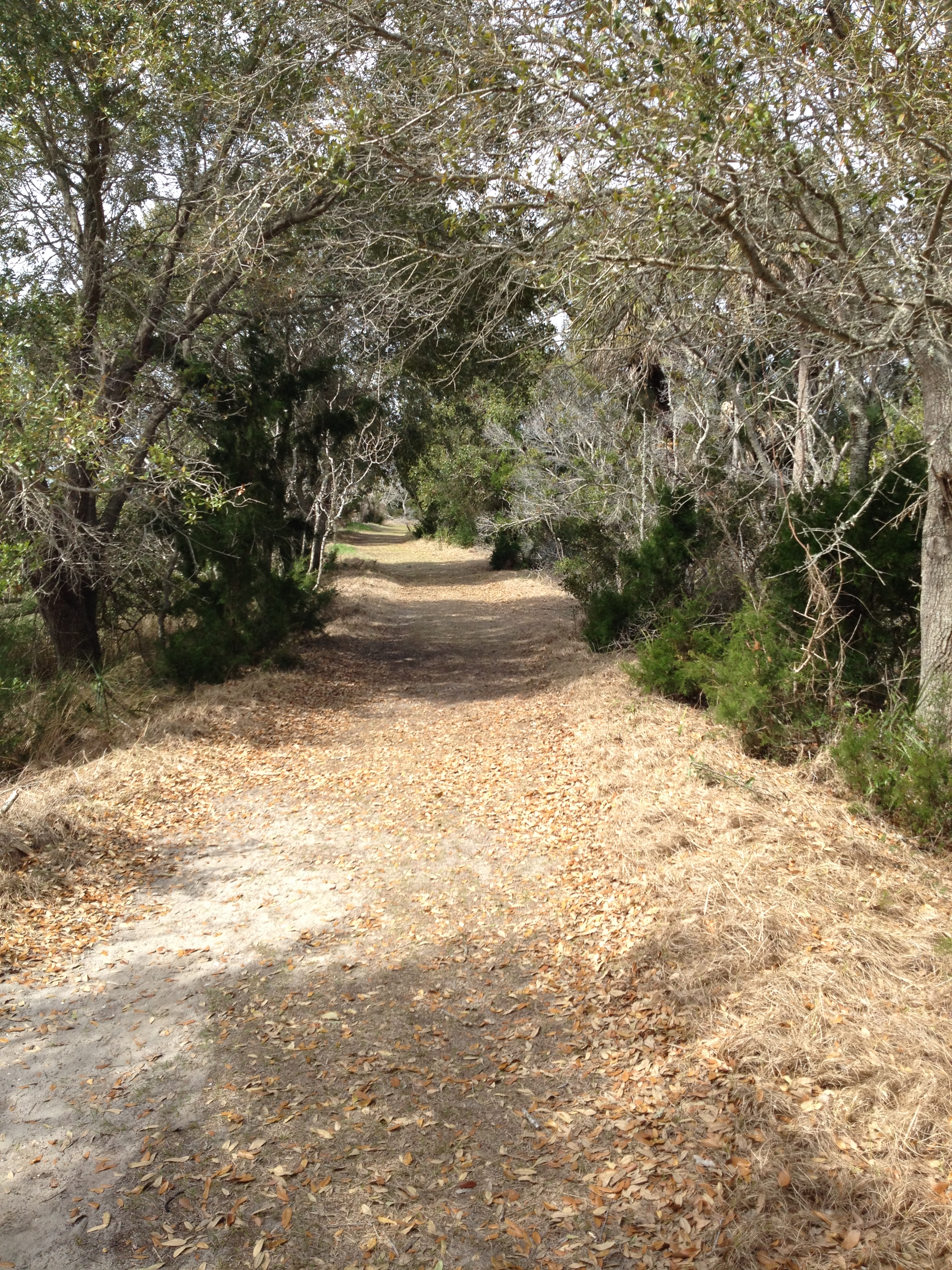
Nature Trail on Capers Island

Capers Island is a state-owned barrier island on the Atlantic Ocean in Charleston County, South Carolina about 15 miles north of the city of Charleston. It is separated from the mainland by salt marshes and the Intracoastal Waterway. To the southwest it is separated from the barrier island Dewees Island by Capers Inlet. To the northwest, it is separated from the barrier island Bulls Island by Price Inlet.

The island is named for French Huguenot immigrants Gabriel, Richard and William Capiers that settled there in 1697.

== Visiting ==
Capers Island is undeveloped and maintained by the State of South Carolina. There is a small dock on Capers Inlet that has a boardwalk across the marsh to an unpaved nature trail which leads to the beach approximately 1 mile to the southeast. Primitive camping is permitted. However, a free permit must be acquired from the State Department of Natural Resources and is limited to 80 campers per night in no more than 20 groups.

== Natural Habitat ==
Capers Island is a barrier island with a number of discrete habitats including:

- Maritime uplands
- Sandy beach
- Salt marsh
- Brackish ponds

=== Flora ===
Plant species on the island include:

- Sabal palm

=== Fauna ===
Numerous animal species inhabit the island and surrounding waters and marshes on a seasonal or permanent basis.

==== Mammals ====
- Raccoon
- White-tailed deer
- Bottlenose dolphins

==== Birds ====
- Bald eagle
- Osprey
- Egret
- Heron
- Ibis
- Bittern
- Brown pelican

==== Reptiles ====
- American alligator
- Loggerhead sea turtle
- eastern diamondback rattlesnake
- timber rattlesnake
- carolina pygmy rattlesnake
- cottonmouth

==== Fish ====
- Bull shark
- White shark
- Bonnethead shark
- Sea trout
- Red drum
- Flounder
- Black drum
- King whiting
- Spot
- Pompano
- Croaker

red drum

==== Crustaceans ====
- Shrimp
- Ghost crab
- Blue crab
- Fiddler crab

==== Mollusks ====
- Oyster
