= Atlanticville, South Carolina =

Historic community in Charleston County, South Carolina

Coordinates: 32.764°N 79.833°W

Atlanticville is a historic community in Charleston County, South Carolina. Its post office operated sporadically from 1903 to 1924, 1925–37, and 1938–42.

== Sources ==
- Journal of the American Philatelist, published monthly. State College, Pennsylvania. Use form US-T154/MMYYYY/p#. 072000/p648
- Atlanticville, South Carolina. Geographic Names Information System, U.S. Geological Survey.
