= Trident Medical Center =

Hospital in North Charleston, South Carolina

- Trident Health System
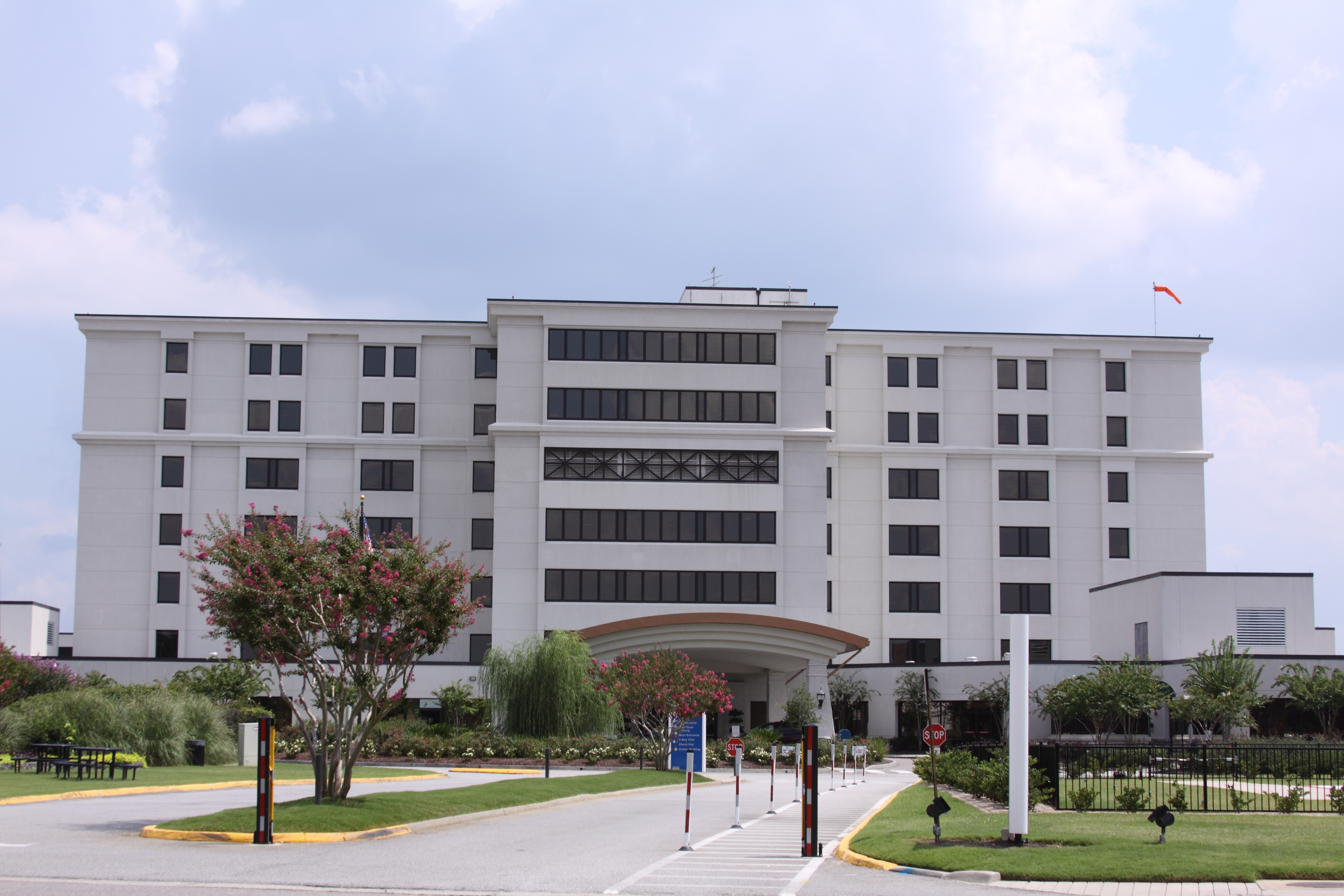

Geography
- Location: 9330 Medical Plaza Drive; North Charleston, South Carolina
- Coordinates: 32°58′34″N 80°4′23″W

Organisation
- Care system: Public
- Type: General

Services
- Emergency department: II
- Beds: 321

History
- Opened: 1975

Links
- Website: tridenthealthsystem.com

Trident Medical Center is a for-profit, 321-bed hospital in North Charleston, South Carolina owned and operated by HCA Healthcare through its subsidiary Trident Health System.

== History ==
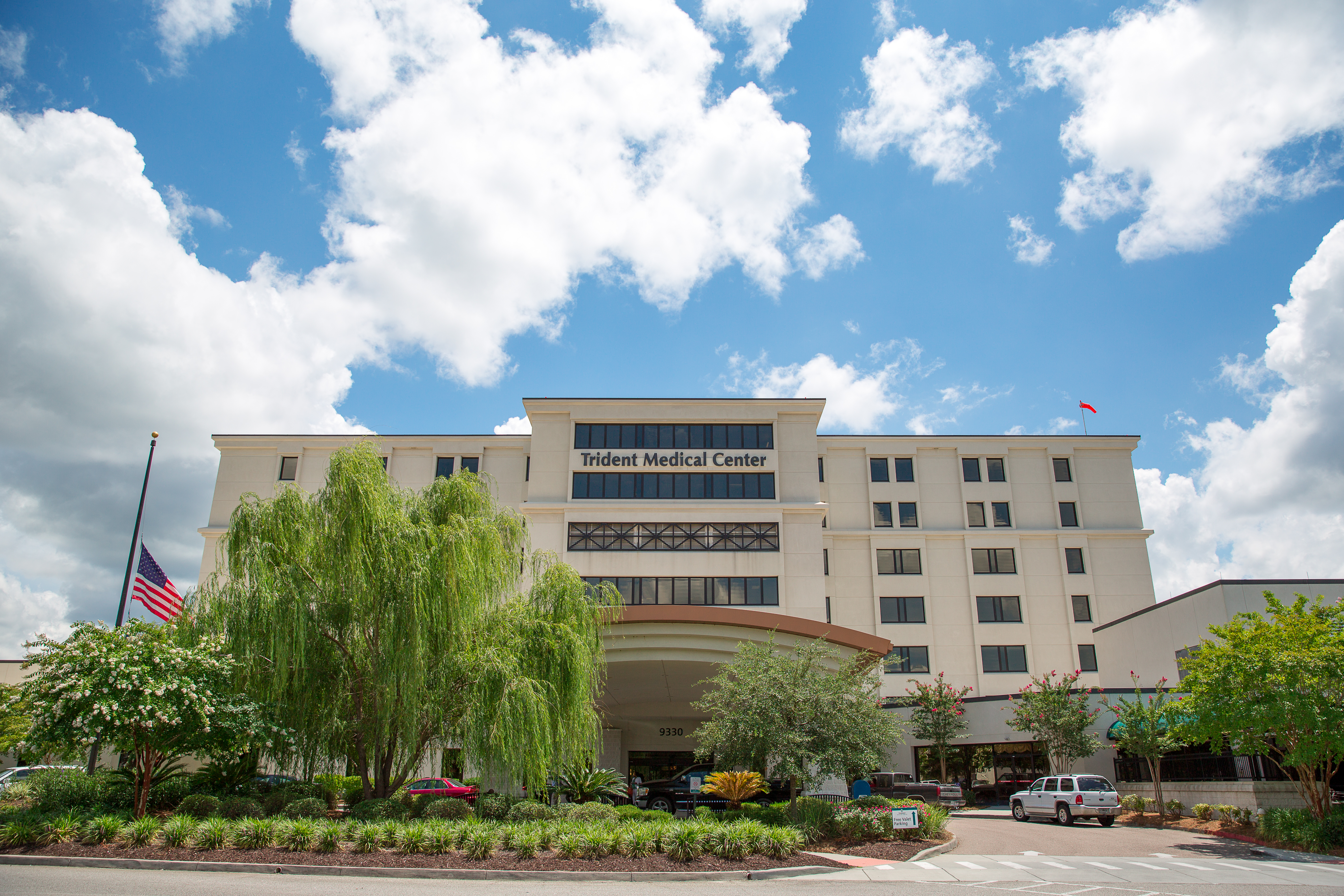
The hospital in 2015

Trident Medical Center originally opened in 1975. In 2015 it celebrated its 40th anniversary and a celebration was held. It is directly across the street from Charleston Southern University.

== Facilities ==
The hospital has been an American College of Surgeons-verified Level II trauma center since 2016.
