= Morris Island Lighthouse =

Lighthouse in South Carolina, US

Morris Island Light
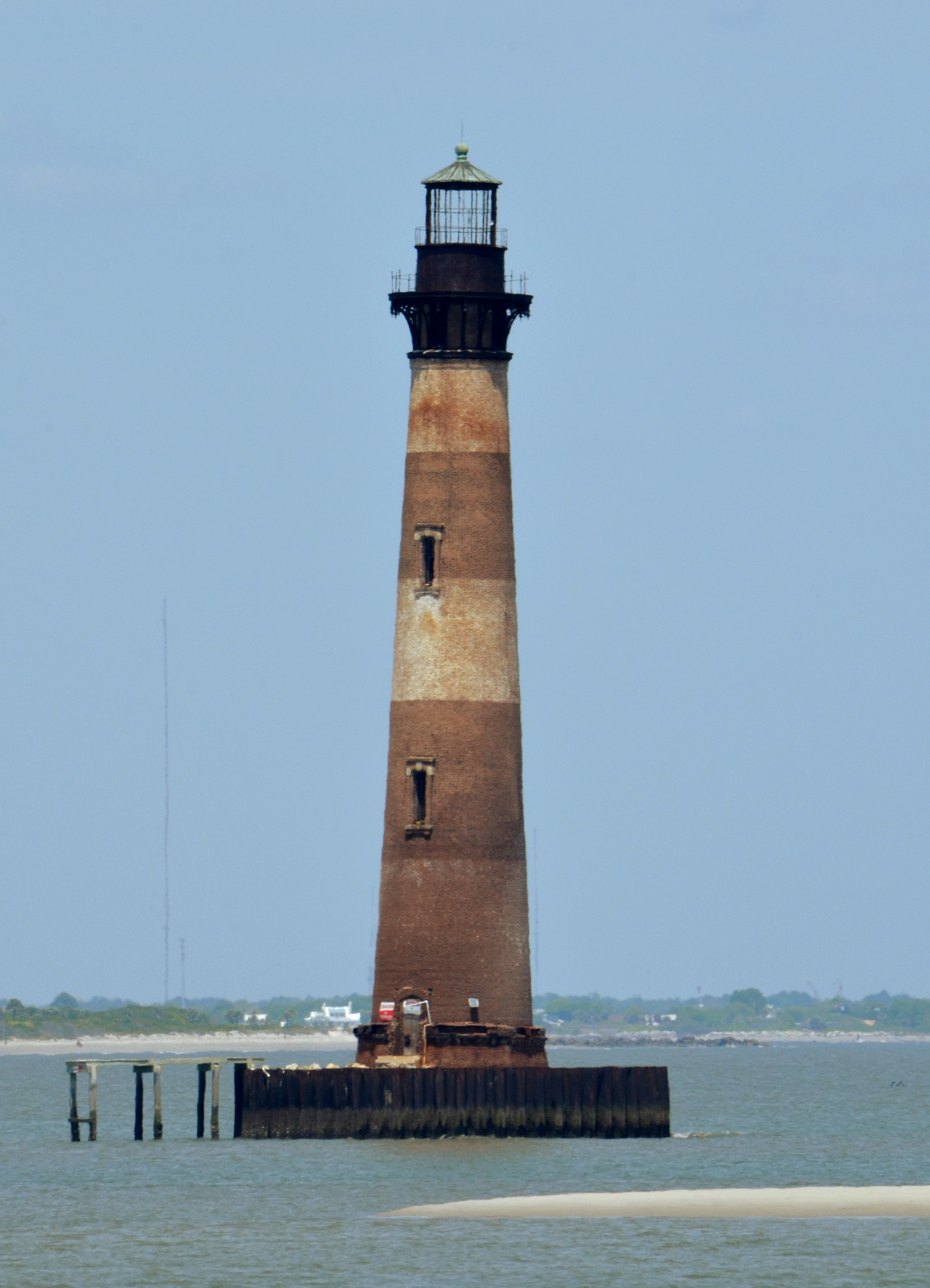
- Morris Island Lighthouse
- Location: Morris Island, South Carolina (Charleston harbor entrance)
- Coordinates: 32°41′43″N 79°53′1″W

Tower
- Constructed: 1767
- Foundation: Timber piling, concrete base
- Construction: Dressed stone
- Automated: 1938
- Height: 161 feet (49 m)
- Shape: Conical
- Heritage: National Register of Historic Places listed place

Light
- First lit: 1876
- Deactivated: 1962
- Lens: First-order Fresnel, 1858
- Morris Island Lighthouse
- U.S. National Register of Historic Places
- Nearest city: Charleston, South Carolina
- Area: less than one acre
- Built: 1876
- NRHP reference No.: 82003837
- Added to NRHP: June 28, 1982

The Morris Island Lighthouse is a lighthouse on Morris Island in South Carolina. The light stands on the southern side of the entrance to Charleston Harbor, north of the City of Folly Beach. At 161 ft (49 m), it is the tallest lighthouse in South Carolina. The lighthouse was named to the National Register of Historic Places in 1982.

Although the lighthouse now stands several hundred feet offshore, it was originally inside a much larger island. When constructed in 1876, the light was approximately 1,200 feet (370 m) from the water's edge. However, the construction in 1889 of the jetties which protect the shipping lanes leading to Charleston Harbor altered ocean currents, resulting in the rapid erosion of Morris Island and the destruction of many structures and historical sites (such as Fort Wagner). By 1938 the shoreline had reached the lighthouse, forcing its automation as it was no longer safe or practical to keep it staffed. In 1962 the Morris Island Light was decommissioned and replaced by the new Charleston Light, located on Sullivan's Island at the north end of the harbor.

== History ==
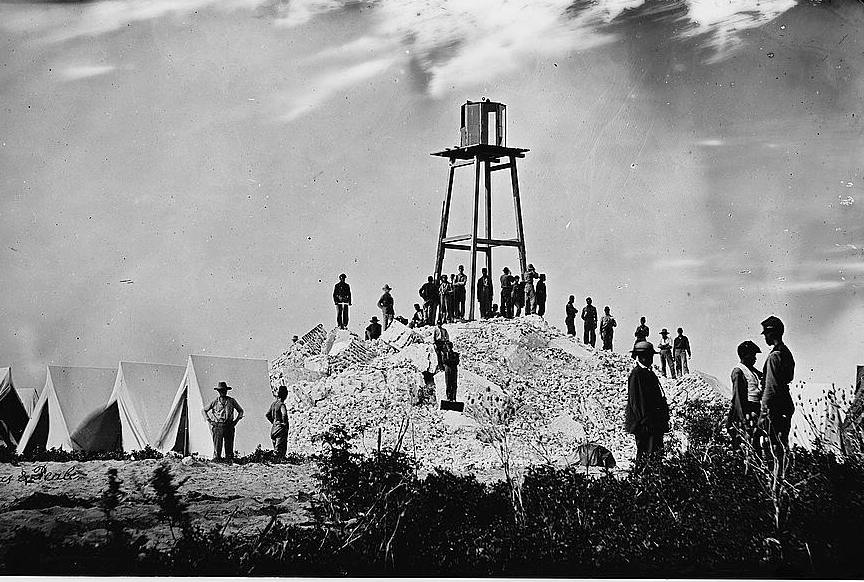
An observation tower built on the lighthouse ruins during the Civil War

The Morris Island Light, located on Morris Island, at the entrance to the harbor of Charleston, SC, was one of the colonial lights turned over to the Federal Government under the terms of the act of August 7, 1789. The light was in a brick tower, built by the Colony of South Carolina in 1767. On May 7, 1800, Congress appropriated $5,000 for repairing the lighthouse. In 1838 the light was described as a revolving light, the tower being 102 feet (31 m) from the base to the lantern. A new first-order lens was installed in the tower on January 1, 1858.

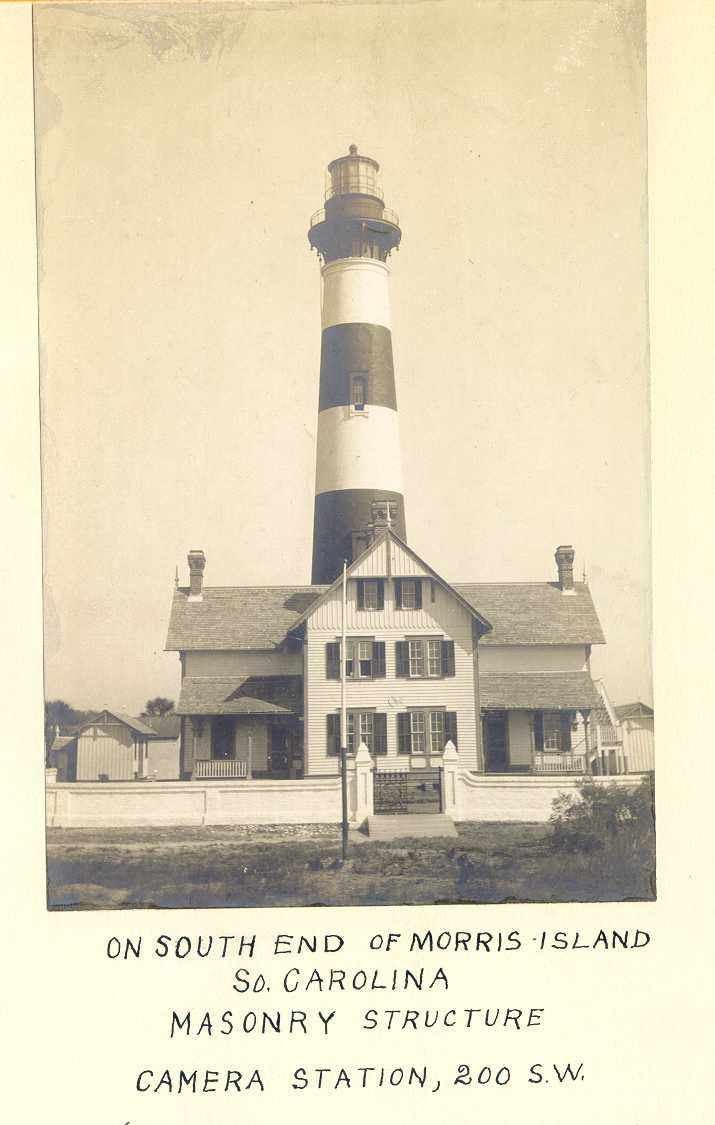
Charleston Light Station, 1914

On December 20, 1860, on receiving reports from the lighthouse inspector at Charleston regarding the probable seizure of the lighthouse property by the Confederacy, the Secretary of the Lighthouse Board wrote the Secretary of the Treasury that he would not recommend "that the coast of South Carolina be lighted by the Federal Government against her will." Ten days later the inspector at Charleston informed the Board that "the Governor of the State of South Carolina has requested me to leave the State. I am informed that forcible possession has been taken of the lights, buoys, etc., of this harbor, and that similar measures will be adopted in regard to all lights in the State." Early in January 1861, the Rattlesnake Shoal Lightship was towed into Charleston and the lighthouse tenders were seized. By the latter part of April 1861, practically all lights were extinguished, lightships removed, and other aids removed or destroyed from the Chesapeake to the Rio Grande, with the exception of some of the lights on the Florida coast and reefs.

In 1862 the Lighthouse Board reported "Charleston, lens and lantern destroyed." In all, 164 lights were forcibly discontinued during the Civil War on the southern coasts. These were relighted from time to time, and by 1866, the greater part had been restored. The Charleston Channel was re-marked promptly on the occupation of the city by Union troops in February 1865. In 1865 the Lighthouse Board reported "that an almost total change had taken place, leaving no channel in the harbor as it was in 1860, and opening new ones. Under this altered state of things it became necessary to establish lights temporarily at such places as would be useful guides through existing channels and omit all other.

On March 3, 1873, Congress made the first of three appropriations for a new lighthouse on Morris Island. $60,000 was granted on that date for "commencing the rebuilding of a first-order seacoast light on Morris Island destroyed during the war." Two other appropriations totaling $90,000 in 1874 and 1875 were for completing the work. The new structure was to be at or near the same spot as the old tower, 150 feet (46 m) high and built of brick, with a first-order flashing light. Foundation piles were driven and the space between them filled with concrete 8 feet (2.4 m) thick. The new tower, when completed in 1876, was 161 feet (49 m) in height and the cost was $149,993.50. A first-order Fresnel lens was installed. In 1884 the illuminating apparatus was changed for the use of mineral oil instead of lard oil.

The cyclone (hurricane) of August 25, 1885, destroyed the rear beacon of the Morris Island range, overturned part of the brick wall which enclosed the tower and dwelling of the main light, carried away the bridge between the beacons, and destroyed a large part of the plank walks connecting the several lights and dwellings, and overturned the boathouse. The range was reestablished 3 days later by a temporary beacon. A new wooden skeleton structure 40 feet (12 m) high was built in 1885.

The 1886 Charleston earthquake threw the lens of the main light out of position and cracked the tower extensively in two places, but not so as to endanger its stability. The lens was replaced and the cracks repaired without delay. Erosion of land caused the Coast Guard to begin construction of a new Charleston Light in 1960. The new light was commissioned on June 15, 1962. The tower stands 140 feet (43 m) high on the north side of Charleston Harbor entrance on Sullivan's Island.

=== Decommissioned ===
Since being decommissioned, hurricanes have destroyed portions of the complex. However, all structures except the lighthouse tower itself were all gone before the 1960s. The dock remained until Hurricane Irma struck in 2017.

==== Save the Light, Inc. ====
In 1999 Save The Light, Inc. purchased the historic lighthouse for $75,000 in order to preserve it. In 2000, the lighthouse was transferred to the State of South Carolina through the Department of Natural Resources. The lighthouse was leased to Save The Light, Inc. for 99 years to coordinate the stabilization, erosion control, restoration and to raise the necessary funds for that work. Starting in 2007, Save The Light, Inc. has periodically lit up the lighthouse.

===== Restoration efforts =====
In August, 2010, a project was completed that stabilized the lighthouse by placing a ring of concrete around it at a cost of $734,313 (USD). In addition, 68 micropiles were placed through the existing foundation. After Hurricane Irma, efforts focused on repairing the dock which was repaired in 2019. Additionally, a study was done to determine the stability of one of the light house's stairs. Restoration costs are estimated to be $7 million.
