= Barrelville, South Carolina =

Settlement in South Carolina, United States

Coordinates: 32°41′11″N 80°21′03″W

Barrelville is an unincorporated community in Charleston County, in the U.S. state of South Carolina.

== History ==
Barrelville originally was built up at the site of a barrel factory, and was named for its chief industry.
