= Clementia, South Carolina =

Former settlement in South Carolina, United States

Coordinates: 32.7583°N 80.1670°W

Clementia is an extinct community in Charleston County, in the U.S. state of South Carolina.

== History ==
The community was named after Moultrie Clement, the original owner of the town site. There was no actual "town" at Clementia; "Clementia Village" was a business.
