= Ashley River, South Carolina =

Ashley River
- Unincorporated community
- Location within South Carolina Location within United States
- Coordinates: 32.808°N 80.023°W
- Country: United States
- State: South Carolina
- County: Charleston
- Time zone: UTC-5 (Eastern Time Zone)
  - Summer (DST): UTC-4 (Eastern Daylight Time)
- ZIP code: 29407

Ashley River is an unincorporated community in Charleston County, South Carolina. Its zip code is 29407.
