= Fort Sumter and Fort Moultrie National Historical Park =

National Historical Park of the United States

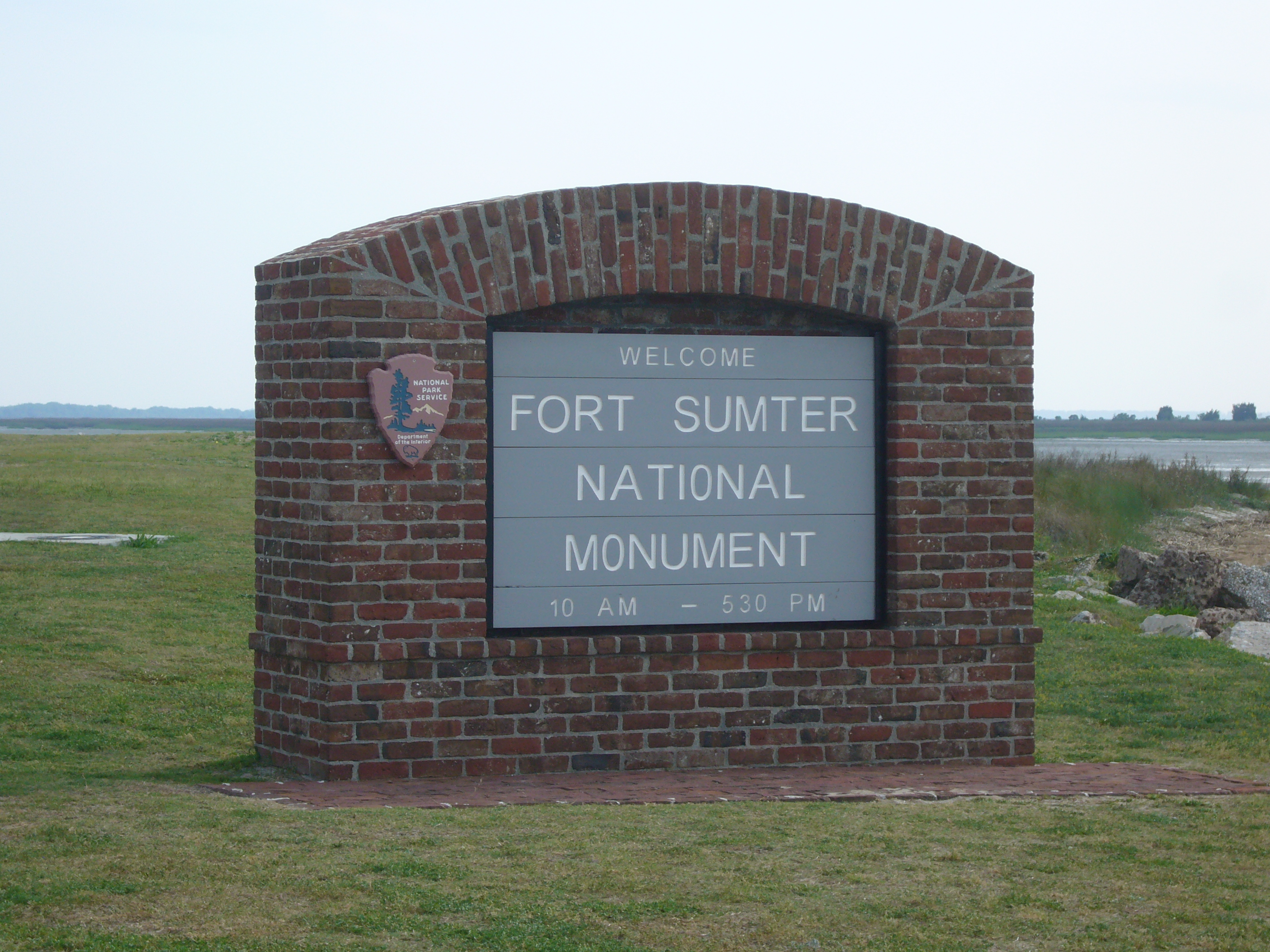

- Location within South Carolina Location within the United States
- Nearest city: Charleston, South Carolina
- Coordinates: 32°45′8″N 79°52′29″W
- Area: 199.57 acres (80.76 ha)
- Established: 1948
- Visitors: 814,658 (in 2025)
- Governing body: National Park Service
- Website: Fort Sumter and Fort Moultrie National Historical Park

Fort Sumter and Fort Moultrie National Historical Park is a United States National Historical Park located in Charleston County, in coastal South Carolina. It mainly protects Fort Sumter, Fort Moultrie, the Charleston Light and Liberty Square. It was known as Fort Sumter National Monument until it was renamed in the John D. Dingell Jr. Conservation, Management, and Recreation Act, signed March 12, 2019.

== Amenities ==
=== Fort Sumter Visitor Education Center ===
The Fort Sumter Visitor Education Center is located at 340 Concord Street, Liberty Square, Charleston, South Carolina, on the banks of the Cooper River. The center features museum exhibits about the disagreements between the North and South that led to the incidents at Fort Sumter, particularly in South Carolina and Charleston. Displays include slavery and the plantation culture, major figures, politics, and how the Confederate Army was formed. This site is also the main departure point for tour boats heading to Fort Sumter in Charleston Harbor. Park rangers and volunteers offer topical programs throughout the week for every boat.

=== Museum ===
The museum at Fort Sumter itself focuses on the activities at the fort, including its construction and role during the American Civil War. The fort is open to the public only via concession tour boat; access from private watercraft or via the low-tide sandbar is not permitted.

=== Fort Moultrie Visitor Center ===
The Fort Moultrie Visitor Center is located at 1214 Middle Street, Sullivan's Island across from the fort itself. There is a self-guiding brochure available and interpretive wayside exhibits posted throughout the fort. Guided tours are offered daily at 11:00 am and 2:30 pm, based on staff availability. The center offers an orientation film and museum exhibits about American seacoast defenses from 1809 to 1947, and the history of the first two forts. There is an information desk staffed by NPS Rangers, a book/souvenir store and bathrooms.

=== Charleston Light ===
Charleston Light is not open to the public but can be viewed from its surrounding grounds, which also allow beach access.
