= Pinopolis Dam =

Dam in Berkeley County, South Carolina, US

Coordinates: 33°15′53″N 80°06′02″W

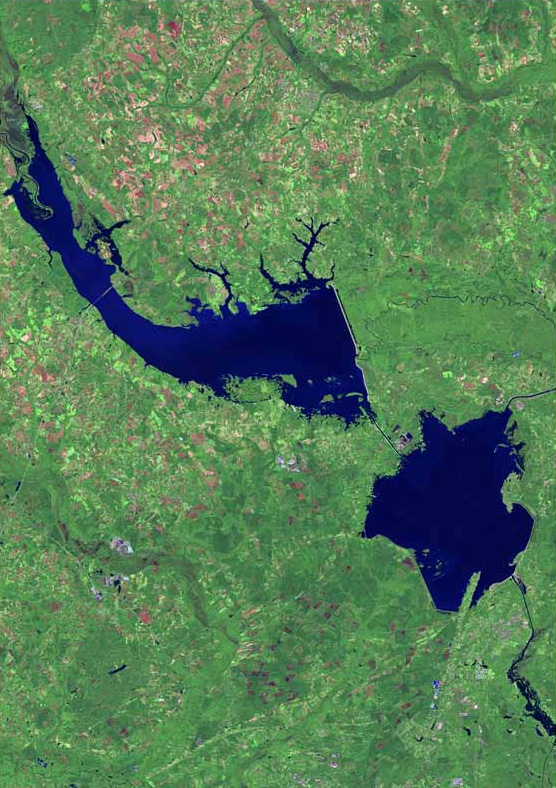
View of Lake Marion (upper left) and Lake Moultrie (bottom right)

Pinopolis Dam is a dam in Berkeley County, South Carolina.

The earthen and concrete dam was completed in 1941 by Santee Cooper, the state-owned electric and water utility also known as South Carolina Public Service Authority. The dam is 138 feet (42 m) high and 11,500 feet (3,500 m) long at its crest.

Broadly speaking, the dam impounds the Cooper River and creates Lake Moultrie. Specifically, Lake Moultrie is fed directly from Lake Marion by a diversion canal built concurrently with the dam. This artificial rerouting of the Cooper River basin has effectively unified the Santee and Cooper River systems into a single hydrological drainage entity.

The overall New Deal-era Santee Cooper Power and Navigation Project improved navigation, provided hydroelectric power, and improved the general health, recreation, and economy of the area. The project was the largest land-clearing project in U.S. history up to that point, with over 12,500 workers clearing over 177,000 acres (720 km^{2}) of swamp and forestland. 42 miles (68 km) of dams and dikes were constructed, including a 26-mile (42 km), 78-foot-tall (24 m) earthen dike. The Pinopolis Dam included the hydroelectric station and navigation lock, the highest single-lift lock in the world. In completing the largest earth-moving project in the nation's history, 42,000,000 cubic yards (32,000,000 m^{3}) of earth were moved, and 3.1 million cubic yards (2,400,000 m^{3}) of concrete were poured.

The $48.2 million project (55 percent federal loan, 45 percent federal grant) first generated electricity on February 17, 1942. As transmission lines were built, power flowed to customers in Berkeley, Georgetown and Horry counties, and ultimately to electric cooperatives serving customers in 46 counties.

The Pinopolis generating station was renamed Jefferies Hydroelectric Station in 1996 after Richard Manning Jefferies, former Governor of South Carolina and executive of Santee Cooper. It produced 419 GWh of electricity in 2022.

The project also flooded the Santee Canal, the cemeteries and plantations of St John's Parish Berkeley, and other historic resources.
