= Strawberry Chapel and Childsbury Town Site =

Archaeological site in South Carolina, United States

- Strawberry Chapel
- U.S. National Register of Historic Places
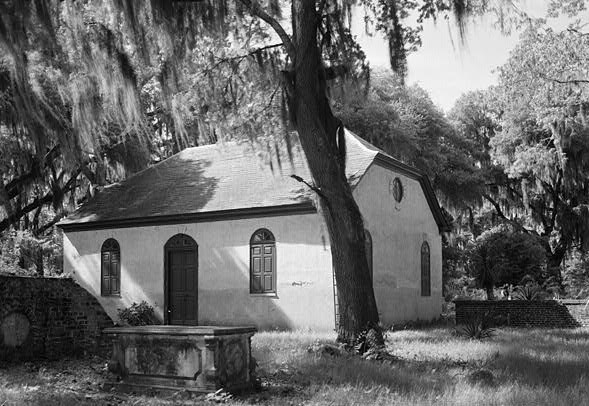
- Strawberry Chapel

- Location within South Carolina Location within the United States
- Location: Berkeley County, South Carolina
- Nearest city: Goose Creek / Moncks Corner
- Coordinates: 33°5′36″N 79°56′7″W
- Built: 1707 (Childsbury); 1725 (Chapel)
- NRHP reference No.: 72001194
- Added to NRHP: April 26, 1972

Strawberry Chapel is a parochial chapel of ease in the lower part of St. John's, Berkeley Parish in Berkeley County, South Carolina that was built in 1725. It is on Strawberry Chapel Road between South Carolina State Highway 8-44 and the West Branch of the Cooper River. Bordering Strawberry's property is the South Carolina State owned historic site of the "Town of Childsbury." It was a planned community that was settled in 1707. The town no longer exists. They were named to the National Register of Historic Places on April 26, 1972. Strawberry Chapel, graveyard and lands are private property and only open to the public on special occasions and annual church services.

== History ==
James Child, an English settler, was granted a tract of 1,200 acres (490 ha) on Strawberry Bluff overlooking the Cooper River. This location was the furthest upstream that ships could travel. He established a ferry across the river.

The town of Childsbury was planned for the bluff. At one time, the town had a tavern, school, chapel, race track, general store, and ferry. A tanner, butcher, shoemaker and carpenters lived in the town. Due to the growth of nearby plantations, the town withered. By 1750, the chapel and tavern continued to be used. Fairs were held until the mid-1750s.

The chapel was a parochial chapel of ease of the Parish of St. John's, Berkeley. The parish church at the time was Biggin Church, which is about 10 mi (16 km) away. The designation of "parochial" meant that it had the authority to baptize and bury the dead.

By 1825, Strawberry Chapel replaced Biggin Church as the parish church. The town is now a South Carolina Heritage Preserve.

== Town plan ==
The town was planned to have twenty-four blocks on Strawberry Bluff. At its center was a market square. Two other squares were named Child's Square and Dixe's Square. The streets were 66 ft (20 m) wide.

Property was assigned for a college, a free school, a church, and a minister's house. Child designated 600 acres (240 ha) for farms and pastures and 100 acres (40 ha) on the bluff for a future citadel. A sketch of the plan for the town has been published.

== Chapel architecture ==
The chapel is a simple, rectangular brick building covered in stucco. It has a jerkin-head roof. The south-facing facade has a double three-paneled door with a flush fanlight. There are shuttered windows on either side of this door. The west end has a single door flanked by a pair of windows. There is decorative rosette window above. The east end has two windows with the rosette window above. Extending from the north wall is a small anteroom for the vestry.

A mural tablet in memory of an early rector of the parish was moved from Biggin Church to Strawberry Chapel. The silver Communion service from Biggin Church, which had been hidden at the end of the Civil War, was found buried in a barn at the Comingtee Plantation in 1947. It is not used at services at Strawberry Chapel but it is on loan to the Charleston Museum.

Additional pictures of the chapel are available.

In preparation for the Chapel's 300th Anniversary, its once-in-a-century restoration project should be completed by 2025.

== Management ==
Strawberry Chapel has Ball, Harleston, Waring and Stoney descendants actively working to protect its historic 1725 structure and graves. A major renovation should be completed by the Chapel's 300th Anniversary in 2025. Steps began in 2018 to dry-out the Chapel walls from years of water intrusion. Four communion services are held annually which visitors may attend. Strawberry Chapel and its burial grounds are on private property and not open to the public. Although the chapel and graveyard property share a property line with the Childbury Township land, the two are completely separate entities. The historic Childsbury Township property is open to the public and owned by the State of South Carolina. It section is not part of Strawberry Chapel's private property.
