= Pimlico, South Carolina =

- Census-designated place
- Location within South Carolina Location within the United States
- Coordinates: 33°05′56″N 79°57′38″W
- Country: United States
- State: South Carolina
- County: Berkeley

Area
  - Total: 0.83 sq mi (2.14 km^{2})
  - Land: 0.69 sq mi (1.78 km^{2})
  - Water: 0.14 sq mi (0.36 km^{2})
- Elevation: 13 ft (4.0 m)

Population (2020)
  - Total: 1,208
  - Density: 1,759.9/sq mi (679.51/km^{2})
- Time zone: UTC-5 (Eastern (EST))
  - Summer (DST): UTC-4 (EDT)
- ZIP Code: 29461 (Moncks Corner)
- Area codes: 843/854
- FIPS code: 45-56545
- GNIS feature ID: 2812938

Pimlico is a housing development and census-designated place (CDP) in Berkeley County, South Carolina, United States. It was first listed as a CDP prior to the 2020 census with a population of 1,208.

The CDP is in central Berkeley County, on the west bank of the West Branch of the Cooper River. It is 5 miles (8 km) east of the Strawberry section of Moncks Corner and 29 miles (47 km) north of Charleston.

== Demographics ==
Historical population
Census	Pop.	Note	%±
2020	1,208		—
U.S. Decennial Census; 2020

Pimlico first appeared as a census designated place in the 2020 U.S. census.

=== 2020 census ===
Pimlico CDP, South Carolina – Demographic Profile (NH = Non-Hispanic)
Race / Ethnicity	Pop 2020	% 2020
White alone (NH)	1,097	90.81%
Black or African American alone (NH)	25	2.07%
Native American or Alaska Native alone (NH)	0	0.00%
Asian alone (NH)	3	0.25%
Pacific Islander alone (NH)	0	0.00%
Some Other Race alone (NH)	3	0.25%
Mixed Race/Multi-Racial (NH)	48	3.97%
Hispanic or Latino (any race)	32	2.65%
Total	1,208	100.00%

Note: the US Census treats Hispanic/Latino as an ethnic category. This table excludes Latinos from the racial categories and assigns them to a separate category. Hispanics/Latinos can be of any race.
