= Biggin Church Ruins =

Historic ruins in South Carolina, United States

- U.S. National Register of Historic Places
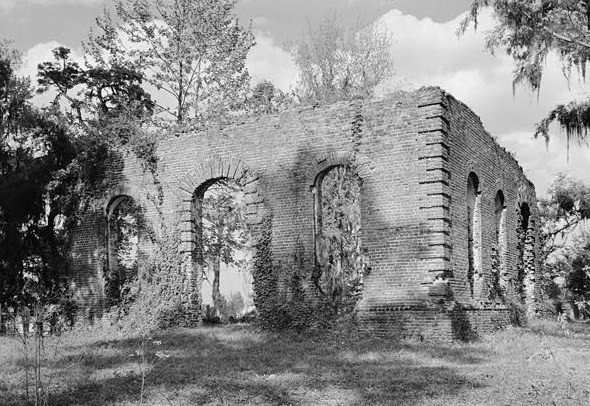
- Biggin Church Ruins in 1940

- Location within South Carolina Location within the United States
- Location: 2 miles northeast of Moncks Corner on South Carolina Highway 402, near Moncks Corner, South Carolina
- Coordinates: 33°12′45″N 79°58′1″W
- Built: ca. 1761
- NRHP reference No.: 77001215
- Added to NRHP: December 13, 1977

The Biggin Church Ruins are the ruins of a church in Berkeley County, South Carolina. Biggin Church is its name in the USGS Geographic Names Information System. The ruins are about 2 mi (3 km) from Moncks Corner, South Carolina, near the intersection of South Carolina Highway 402 and State Highway 8-376. The church has been burned three times since it was first constructed in about 1711. It was the church of the parish of St. John's, Berkeley (Strawberry Chapel.) The ruins are from the church built in 1761 and its reconstruction in 1781. It was included in the National Register of Historic Places on December 13, 1977. UPDATE 11/2019: Biggin Church Ruins remain part of Strawberry Chapel’s land.

== History ==
The site for the church, Biggin Hill, is probably named for Biggin Hill in the London Borough of Bromley. The Parish of St. John's, Berkeley was created in the South Carolina Assembly Act of 1704 and the Church Act of 1706. St. John's, Berkeley had the largest area of the original ten parishes of the Province. These parishes served both religious and civil functions in the colony. The land for the church was donated by the Landgrave John Colleton.

The first church was built around 1711 to replace a wooden building that had been used for religious services. This church burned in a forest fire around 1755.

The church was replaced with a new building in 1761. In this period, parishioners included Henry Laurens and William Moultrie. During the Revolutionary War, British troops used the church as a depot. As they retreated, the church and stores were burned in 1781. The church was rebuilt.

The church was used up to the Civil War. During the war, the furniture was removed and the church building was damaged. The church was neglected. Around 1886, 1890, or the 1890s. the church was burned in a forest fire. After the fire, its bricks were scavenged for other construction projects.

== Architecture ==
The church was a rectangular brick building about 30 ft (9 m) by 60 ft (18 m). It was originally done in English bond. Currently, only two walls remain. One wall was probably the main entrance. It has a large portal with Gibbs surround that is flanked by two windows on the left and on the right. The windows are arched with brick voussoirs. The other wall is the end of the church with a door flanked by windows on the left and right. There are quoins at the corner and a water table, which is horizontal projecting band, made with rounded bricks near the base of the wall.

A mural tablet in memory of an early rector of the parish was moved from Biggin Church to its former chapel of ease, Strawberry Chapel, which is about 10 mi (16 km) away. The silver Communion service from Biggin Church, which had been hidden at the end of the Civil War, was found buried in a barn at the Combahee Plantation in 1947. The silver was returned to Strawberry Chapel's vestry and is currently (2019) on display at the Charleston Museum.

There is a cemetery nearby that is still used. It includes the grave of Sir John Colleton III, the great grandson of the Lord Proprietor.

Additional photographs of the ruins are available.
