= Sangaree =

Sangaree may refer to:

- Sangaree, a cocktail with etymology related to the wine beverage sangria
- Sangaree, a common name of Sri Lankan Tamil National Alliance leader Veerasingham Anandasangaree
- Sangaree (film), 1953 3-D color period costume drama
- Sangaree, South Carolina, United States, an unincorporated community in Berkeley County
