= Lester Bates =

Influential Mayor of Columbia, South Carolina

Lester Lee Bates Sr. (September 7, 1904 – February 24, 1988) was an insurance agent who served as the mayor of Columbia, South Carolina. He served three terms as Columbia's mayor. Before that he served on the city council.

He was born in the Hell Hole Swamp area to Alfred G. Bates and Ella Cumbee. He helped establish the Columbia Metropolitan Airport in 1962, He helped advocate for incorporate the U.S. Army to incorporate Fort Jackson into Columbia's city limits. He was also involved in establishing the Carolina Coloseum. He established committees to work toward peaceful desegregation. He received an honorary Doctor of Laws degree from the University of South Carolina. He died in Columbia on February 24, 1988. He was buried Eccles United Methodist Churchyard in Moncks Corner.

He lived at 2408 Marion Street. Lester Bates Park is named for him. A section of Freeway is named for him.

He married Julia Burk and they had two children. His son Leater L. Bates Jr. was interviewed in 2005 about his father.

Lester Bates Jr. was a lawyer, judge, and historian.
