= Gumville, South Carolina =

- Unincorporated community
- Location within the state of South Carolina
- Coordinates: 33°16′52″N 79°43′40″W
- Country: United States
- State: South Carolina
- County: Berkeley
- Elevation: 40 ft (12 m)
- Time zone: UTC-5 (Eastern (EST))
  - Summer (DST): UTC-4 (EDT)
- ZIP code: 29453
- Area codes: 843, 854

Gumville is an unincorporated community in Berkeley County, South Carolina, United States. It is located approximately 2 miles west of Jamestown on U.S. Route 17 Alternate. Gumville was made famous as the birthplace of L. Mendel Rivers, the longtime Representative of the 1st congressional district. When queried about where he was born by reporters, Rivers would reply "I'm from Gumville. It's near Hell Hole Swamp. If you don't know where it is, look it up."

Gumville is part of the Charleston–North Charleston–Summerville Metropolitan Statistical Area.

== Geography ==
Gumville is located at 33°16′52″N 79°43′40″W (33.281111, -79.727778).

A road named Gumville Road runs from Gumville, at the intersection with US 17A, south for three miles to the junction with Calestown Road.
