= Cypress Gardens (South Carolina) =

Historic botanical garden in Moncks Corner, South Carolina, United States

Coordinates: 33°3′23″N 79°57′21″W

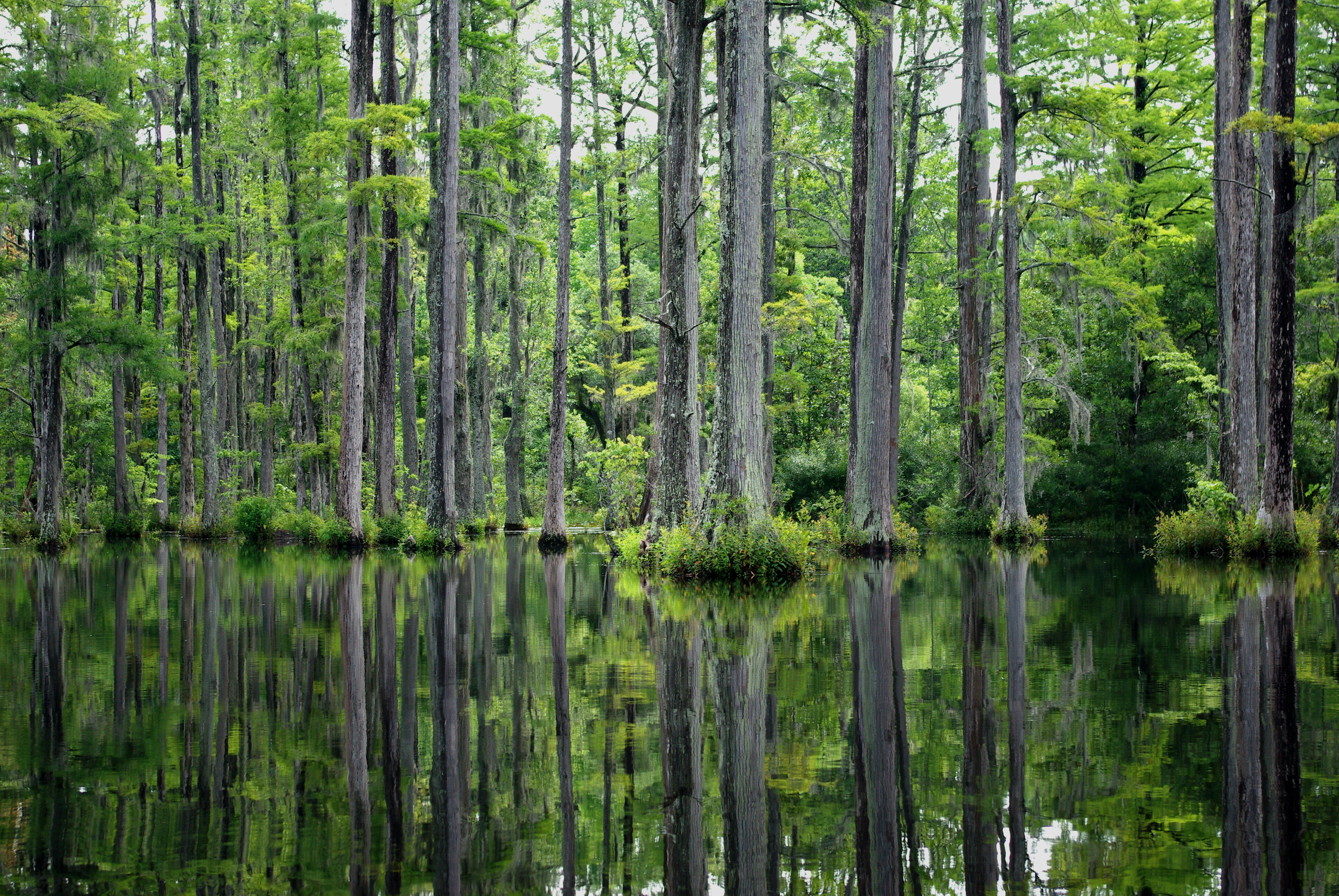
- Interactive map of Cypress Gardens
- Location: 3030 Cypress Gardens Road, Moncks Corner, South Carolina
- Area: 170 acres (69 ha)
- Website: Official website

Cypress Gardens is a 170-acre (69 ha) preserve and gardens located at 3030 Cypress Gardens Road, Moncks Corner, South Carolina, United States. The centerpiece of the garden is the 80 acres (32 ha) blackwater bald cypress/tupelo swamp, surrounded with both boat and foot trails.

== History ==
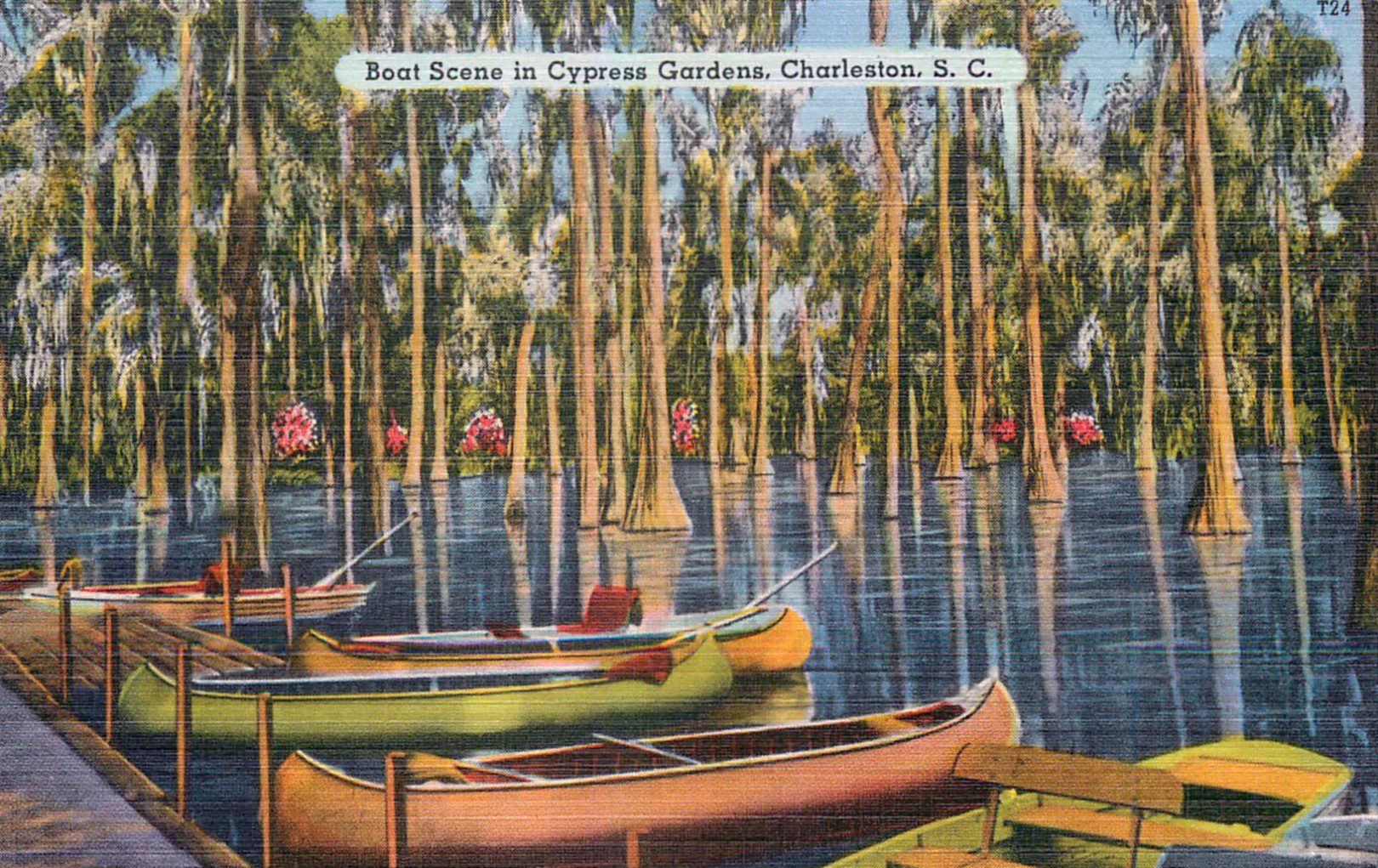
Boat scene from a historical postcard. The back of the postcard mentions Cypress Gardens, which is 23 miles north of Charleston.

The gardens were originally part of the 1750 Dean Hall rice plantation, which depended on fresh water from the Cooper River. The area that is now a swamp was dug out and fitted with water gates to become a fresh water reservoir. The property had fallen into disuse when, in 1909, Benjamin Kittredge purchased it to use as a duck hunting reserve. During the Great Depression, over 200 workers built 4.5 miles (7.2 km) of trails around the swamp. The property was opened to the public in 1931.

The gardens were originally part of the 1750 Dean Hall rice plantation, which depended on fresh water from the Cooper River. The area that is now a swamp was dug out and fitted with water gates to become a fresh water reservoir. The property had fallen into disuse when, in 1909, Benjamin Kittredge purchased it to use as a duck hunting reserve. During the Great Depression, over 200 workers built 4.5 miles (7.2 km) of trails around the swamp. The property was opened to the public in 1931.

on June 1, 1963, Kittredge's son, Benjamin Rufus Kittredge Jr. (1900–1981), donated the property to the City of Charleston. In the 1970s, the house at Dean Hall was moved to Beaufort County for preservation.

Hurricane Hugo in 1989 severely affected the park, causing it to close for a year. Berkeley County took over ownership when the City of Charleston no longer wanted to support the garden.

In October 2015, historic flooding hit the state of South Carolina that greatly impacted the botanical preserve. On October 13, it was announced that the attraction would be closed indefinitely following an assessment of millions of dollars of damage. Cypress Gardens officials announced intentions to apply for FEMA assistance. Though they hoped to reopen by the summer of 2016, the park remained closed for nearly four years.

On April 13, 2019, Cypress Gardens reopened. Over 3,000 people visited for the Grand Opening. Berkeley County Officials announced the park would remain free for Berkeley County residents until June 30.

== Features and facilities ==
The gardens are viewed via flat-bottom boat or footpaths. Plantings around the swamp include azaleas, blueberries, a camellia garden, daffodils, a daylily island, dogwoods, pitcher plants, redbud, a small rice field, and a rose garden, as well as the following major features:

- Swamparium (1998) – features native and exotic fish, reptile and amphibian species from swamp habitats, including common local venomous snakes and large aquatic salamanders called sirens. The Swamparium holds approximately 24,000 US gallons (91,000 L; 20,000 imp gal) of water.
- Aviary – houses African grey parrots and a sulfur-crested cockatoo, former pets.
- Butterfly House (1997) – a 2,500-square-foot (230 m^{2}) indoor exhibit housing butterflies, birds, koi, goldfish and turtles.

The gardens also include picnic tables, rental facilities, and 4.5 miles (7.2 km) of walking paths and nature trails.

== Movies and television ==
Cypress Gardens has hosted over 16 major movies and television series, including:

- The Patriot
- Cold Mountain
- The Notebook
- North and South
- Swamp Thing

== Gallery ==
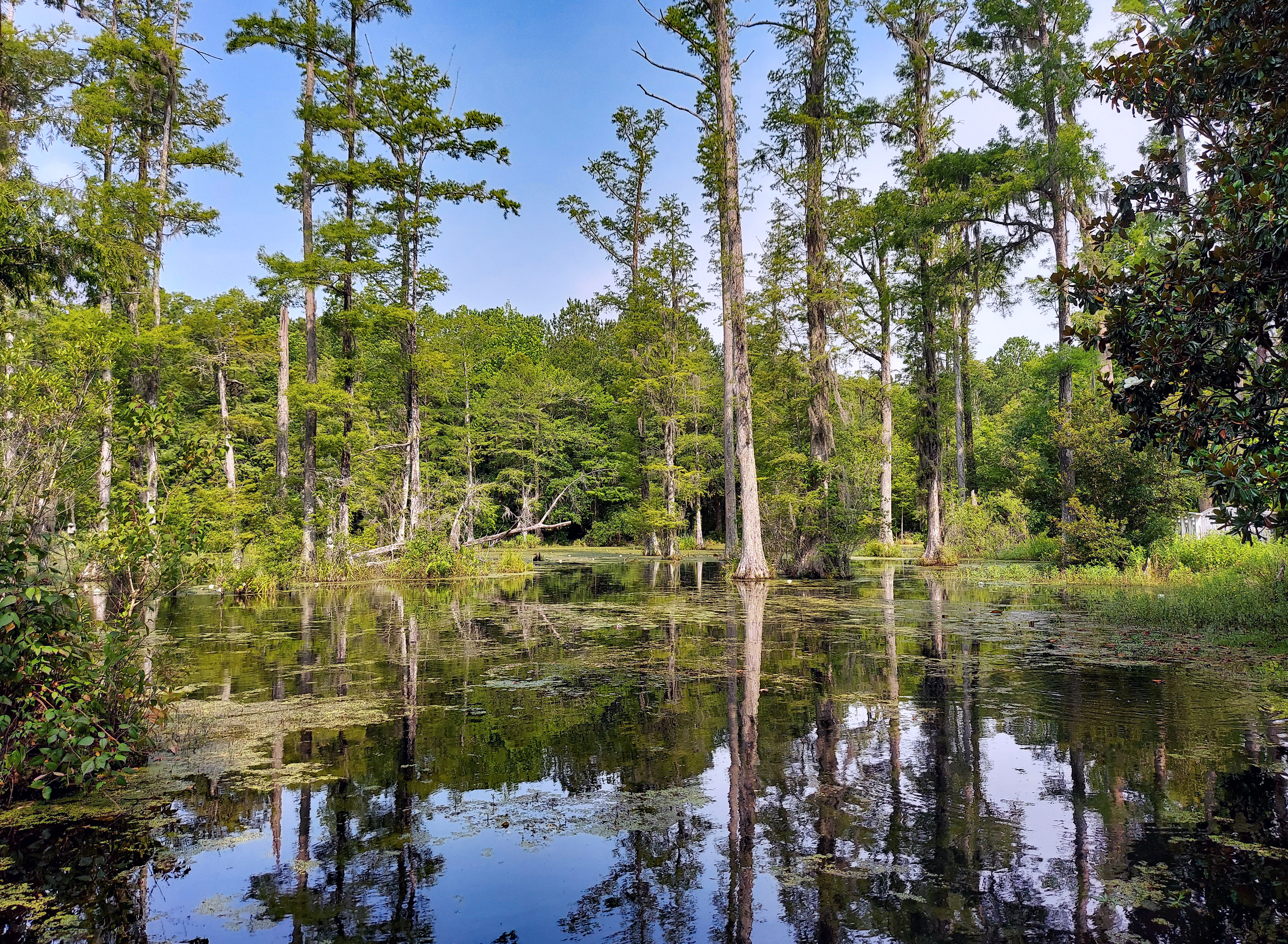
Part of the preserve

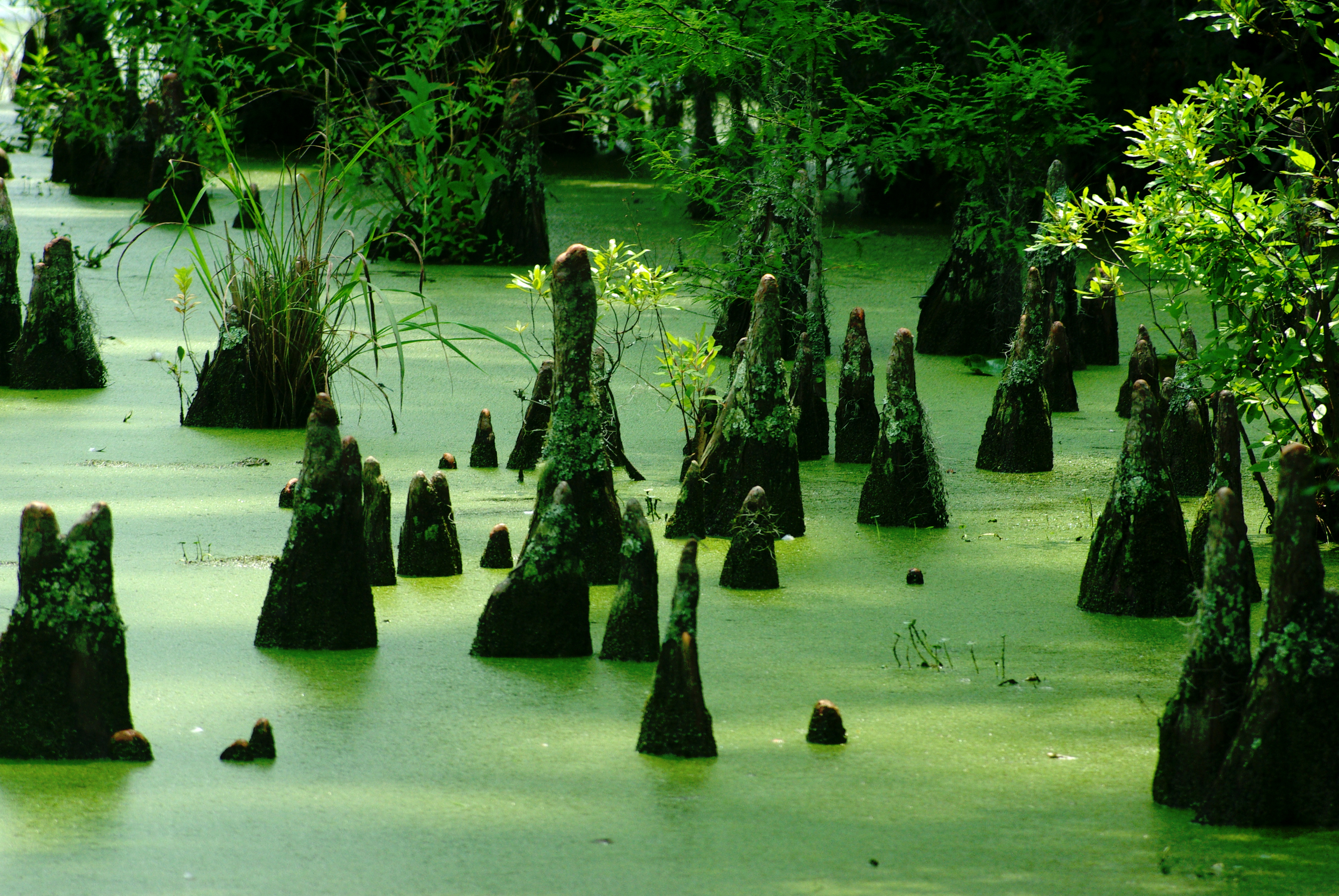
Cypress Knees

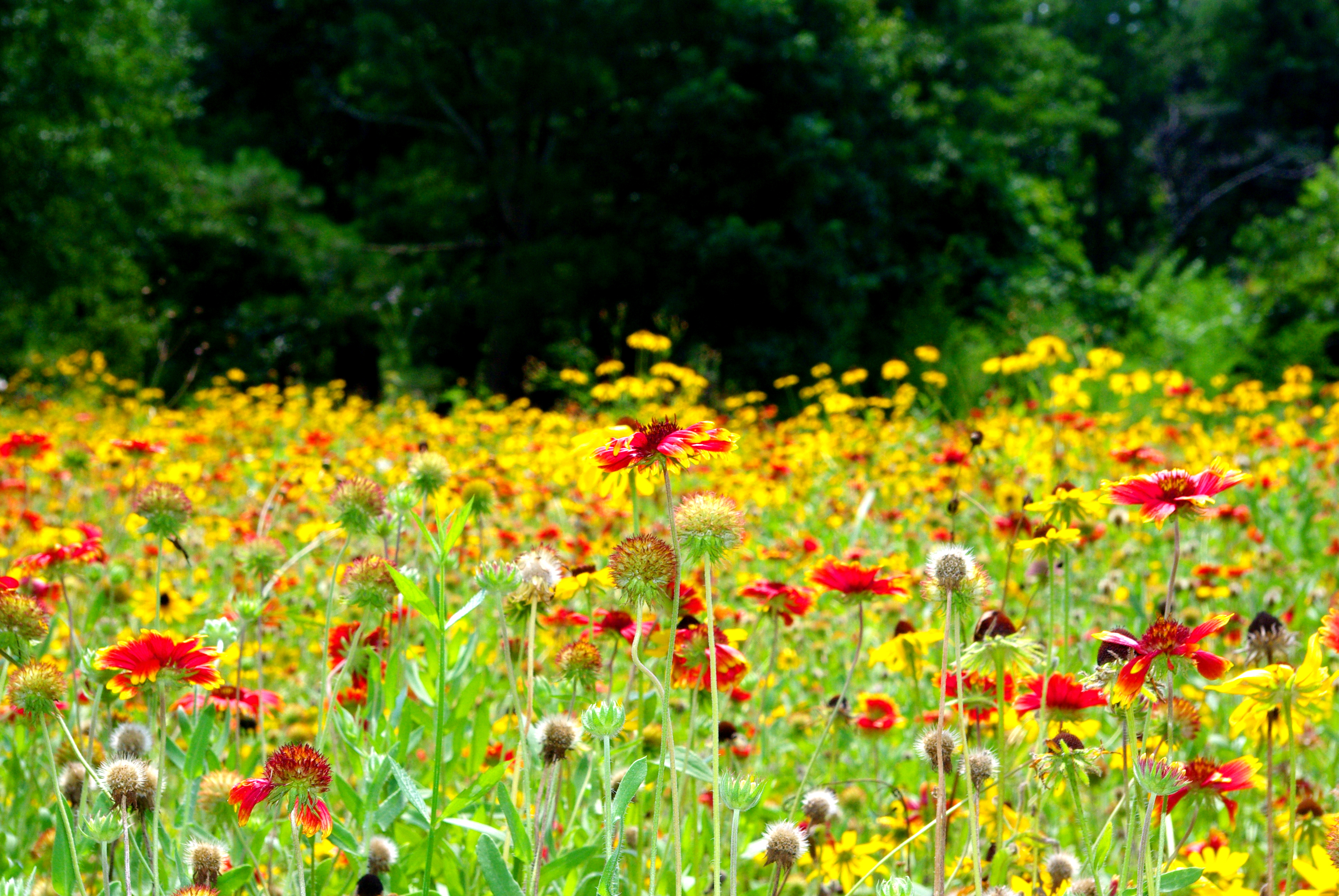
Wildflower Field

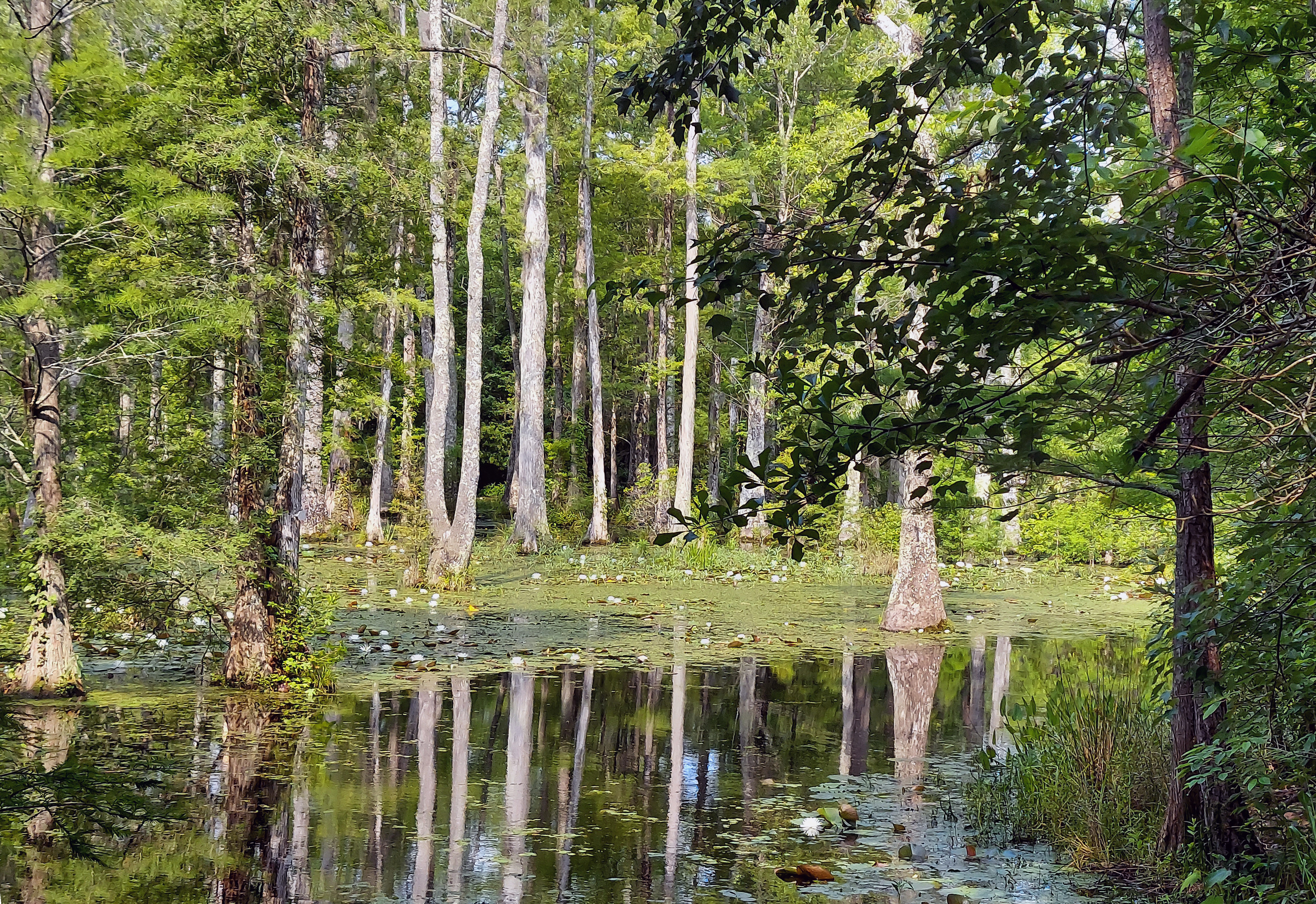
Several boat trails available.
