= Hell Hole Swamp =

Swamp in Berkeley County, South Carolina

Hell Hole Bay Wilderness
- IUCN category Ib (wilderness area)
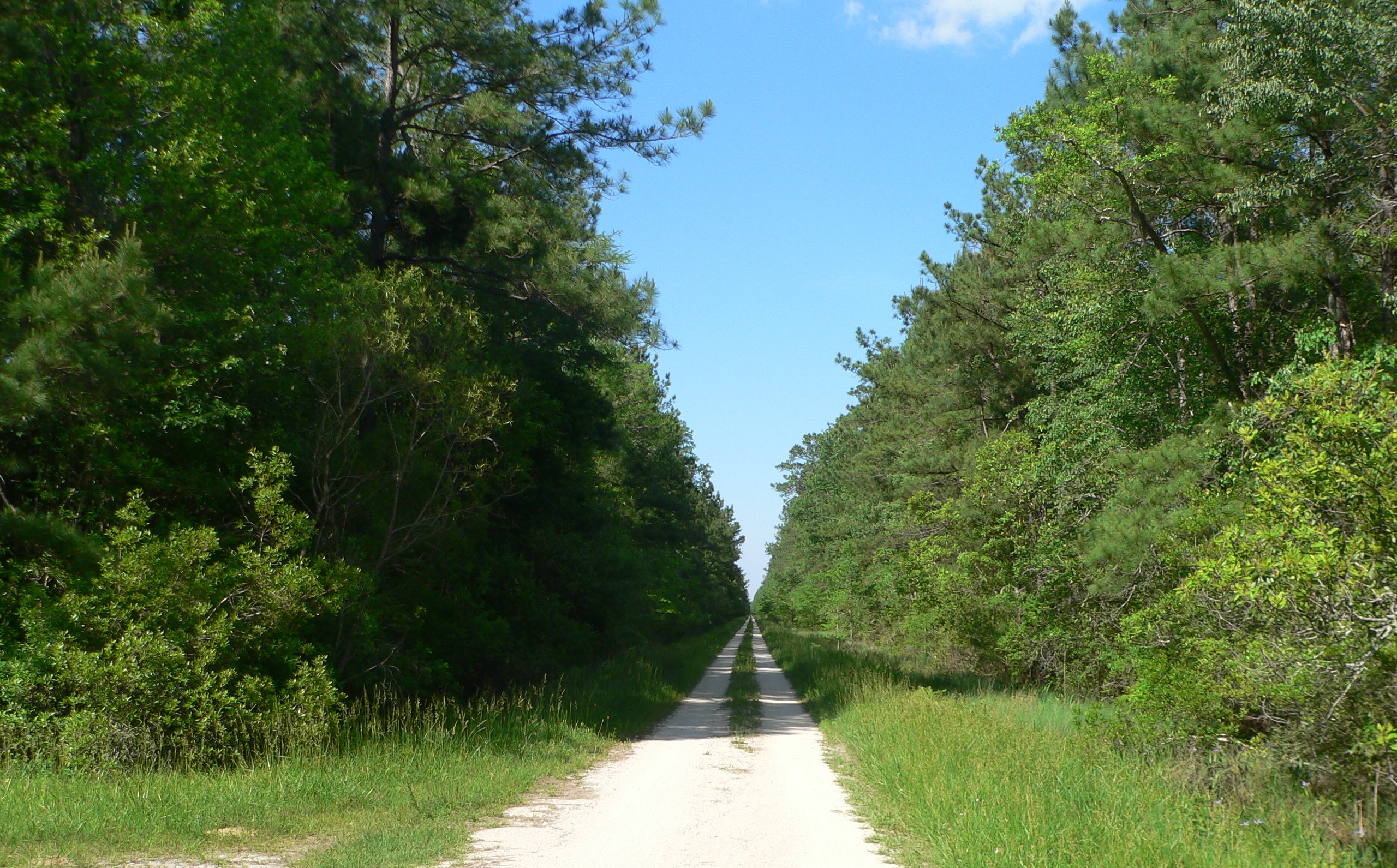
- Hell Hole Road (FS158). Hellhole Bay Wilderness Area begins on the southeast (right) side of the road.

- Location within the United States
- Location: Berkeley County, South Carolina, USA
- Nearest city: Jamestown, South Carolina
- Coordinates: 33°13′40″N 79°42′12″W
- Area: 2,125 acres (9 km^{2})
- Governing body: U.S. Forest Service

Hell Hole Swamp is a swamp in northeastern Berkeley County, South Carolina famous for its unique name. It is located entirely within the Francis Marion National Forest and contains 2,125 acres (9 km^{2}), all of which is designated as a wilderness area.

== Origin ==
The name dates back to at least 1757, appearing on a map of the South Carolina and Georgia coastline. In 1761, on March 3, James Colladon received a grant of 500 acres on Hell Hole Swamp. The origin of the name Hell Hole Swamp is unknown, although there are a couple of theories. One account says that the swamp got its name during the American Revolutionary War from Colonel Banastre Tarleton because the British had great difficulty finding the elusive General Francis Marion. Another explanation is that it was named for being a repository for bootleggers during the Prohibition. Both theories are proved false because they are predated by the 1773 James Cook Map of South Carolina which locates the Hell Hole Swamp.

== Hell Hole Swamp Festival ==
The Hell Hole Swamp Festival takes place during the first weekend in May at Jamestown, on the northern edge of the swamp. It is a typical Southern festival complete with a cocoa spitting contest, arm wrestling, beauty contests and much more. One unique event of the festival is the Hell Hole Gator Trot 10k, colloquially called the Redneck Run. It began in 1976 and is one of the oldest road races in South Carolina.

== Hell Hole Swamp Gang ==
A group of native sons of Berkeley County boasted of their membership in the Hell Hole Swamp Gang. They were 1st congressional district Representative L. Mendel Rivers, Governor of South Carolina Robert Evander McNair, state Senator Rembert Dennis, and Columbia mayor Lester Bates. Rivers was especially proud of the uniqueness of being born in this remote area and would tell reporters that he was "from Gumville. It's near Hell Hole Swamp. If you don't know where it is, look it up."
