= Quinby Plantation House-Halidon Hill Plantation =

Historic house in South Carolina, United States

- U.S. National Register of Historic Places
- Location within South Carolina Location within the United States
- Location: 3 miles west of Huger, near Huger, South Carolina
- Area: 1,960 acres (790 ha)
- Built: c. 1800, 1954
- Architectural style: Federal
- NRHP reference No.: 85003122
- Added to NRHP: October 10, 1985

Quinby Plantation House-Halidon Hill Plantation is a historic plantation house located near Huger, Berkeley County, South Carolina. The house was built about 1800, and is a 2 1/2-story, five-bay, frame Federal style plantation house. It sits on a low brick foundation and has a gable roof. In 1954, in order to save Quinby Plantation from destruction, the owners moved it approximately four miles to Halidon Hill Plantation. Halidon Hill Plantation is associated with the lowcountry rice culture and was historically part of Middleburg Plantation. The property is privately owned and not open to the public.

It was listed in the National Register of Historic Places in 1985.
