= Bonneau, South Carolina =

- Town
- Motto: Where the living is easy...
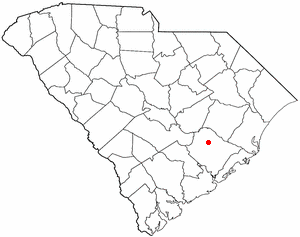
- Location of Bonneau, South Carolina
- Coordinates: 33°18′29″N 79°57′26″W
- Country: United States
- State: South Carolina
- County: Berkeley

Area
  - Total: 3.12 sq mi (8.07 km^{2})
  - Land: 3.02 sq mi (7.83 km^{2})
  - Water: 0.093 sq mi (0.24 km^{2})
- Elevation: 56 ft (17 m)

Population (2020)
  - Total: 431
  - Density: 142.6/sq mi (55.04/km^{2})
- Time zone: UTC-5 (Eastern (EST))
  - Summer (DST): UTC-4 (EDT)
- ZIP code: 29431
- Area codes: 843, 854
- FIPS code: 45-07525
- GNIS feature ID: 2405302

Bonneau is a town in Berkeley County, South Carolina, United States. As of the 2020 census, Bonneau had a population of 431. It is part of the Charleston–North Charleston–Summerville Metropolitan Statistical Area.

== History ==
The community was named after the family of Floride Bonneau Calhoun, wife of U.S. politician John C. Calhoun.

== Geography ==
Bonneau is located in north-central Berkeley County on the east shore of Lake Moultrie. The town is on the western edge of the Francis Marion National Forest. U.S. Route 52 passes through the town, leading south 41 miles (66 km) to Charleston and north 71 miles (114 km) to Florence.

According to the United States Census Bureau, the town has a total area of 3.1 square miles (7.9 km^{2}), of which 3.0 square miles (7.8 km^{2}) is land and 0.039 square miles (0.1 km^{2}), or 1.74%, is water.

== Demographics ==
Historical population
Census	Pop.	Note	%±
1940	493		—
1950	408		−17.2%
1960	402		−1.5%
1970	365		−9.2%
1980	401		9.9%
1990	374		−6.7%
2000	354		−5.3%
2010	487		37.6%
2020	431		−11.5%
U.S. Decennial Census

As of the census of 2000, there were 354 people, 156 households, and 99 families residing in the town. The population density was 125.6 inhabitants per square mile (48.5/km^{2}). There were 176 housing units at an average density of 62.5 per square mile (24.1/km^{2}). The racial makeup of the town was 76.55% White, 20.34% Black, 0.85% Native American, 1.13% from other races, and 1.13% from two or more races. Hispanic or Latino of any race were 0.85% of the population.

There were 156 households, out of which 26.9% had children under the age of 18 living with them, 45.5% were married couples living together, 13.5% had a female householder with no husband present, and 36.5% were non-families. 30.8% of all households were made up of individuals, and 10.9% had someone living alone who was 65 years of age or older. The average household size was 2.27 and the average family size was 2.85.

In the town, the population was spread out, with 21.2% under the age of 18, 9.6% from 18 to 24, 24.3% from 25 to 44, 29.9% from 45 to 64, and 15.0% who were 65 years of age or older. The median age was 41 years. For every 100 females, there were 100.0 males. For every 100 females age 18 and over, there were 92.4 males.

The median income for a household in the town was $30,938, and the median income for a family was $36,250. Males had a median income of $33,333 versus $25,833 for females. The per capita income for the town was $15,799. About 21.4% of families and 19.4% of the population were below the poverty line, including 20.0% of those under age 18 and 32.7% of those age 65 or over.

== Climate ==
The climate in this area is characterized by relatively high temperatures and evenly distributed precipitation throughout the year. According to the Köppen Climate Classification system, Bonneau has a Humid subtropical climate, abbreviated "Cfa" on climate maps.
