= Pimlico (disambiguation) =

Pimlico is a district in London.

Pimlico may also refer to:

== Places ==
- Pimlico, New South Wales, Australia
- Pimlico, Queensland, Australia, a suburb of Townsville
- Pimlico, Hertfordshire, a hamlet in Hertfordshire, England, north of Bedmond
- Pimlico, Lancashire, England, a village to the north of Clitheroe
- Pimlico, Dublin, Ireland, an area of Dublin
- Pimlico, Baltimore, Maryland, United States, a neighborhood
- Pimlico, South Carolina, United States, a census-designated place

== Schools ==
- Pimlico State High School, Townsville, Australia
- Pimlico Academy, formerly Pimlico School, a secondary school and sixth form with academy status in London's Pimlico district

== Other uses ==
- Pimlico Race Course, a horse racetrack in Baltimore, Maryland, United States
- Pimlico tube station, in London's Pimlico district
- Pimlico (publishing imprint), an imprint of publisher Random House
- Operation Pimlico, a plan used to extract double agent Oleg Gordievsky after he was recalled to the Soviet Union under suspicion
- "Pimlico", a 1996 song by David Devant & His Spirit Wife

== See also ==
- Pimlico Sound, a lagoon in North Carolina, United States
