= Cooper River Historic District =

Historic district in South Carolina, United States

- U.S. National Register of Historic Places
- U.S. Historic district
- Location within South Carolina Location within the United States
- Location: Along the East and West Branches of the Cooper River, near Moncks Corner, South Carolina
- Coordinates: 33°13′52″N 80°02′04″W
- Area: 30,820 acres (12,470 ha)
- Architectural style: Colonial, Early Republic, Southern Vernacular
- MPS: Cooper River MPS
- NRHP reference No.: 02000571
- Added to NRHP: February 5, 2003

Cooper River Historic District is a national historic district located along the East and West Branches of the Cooper River near Moncks Corner, Berkeley County, South Carolina. It encompasses 32 contributing buildings, 77 contributing sites, 8 contributing structures, and 4 contributing objects and is a remarkably intact historic and cultural landscape. The district includes many historic buildings, structures, and objects from the 18th, 19th, and 20th centuries and archaeological remains of settlements, machines, barns, and other structures that supported agricultural activity. In addition, there are landscape features dating to the 18th and 19th centuries such as rice fields, banks, canals, dams, reservoirs or reserves, causeways, roads, avenues, upland fields, fence lines, and cemeteries.

It was listed in the National Register of Historic Places in 2002.
