= Pompion Hill Chapel =

Historic church in South Carolina, United States

- U.S. National Register of Historic Places
- U.S. National Historic Landmark
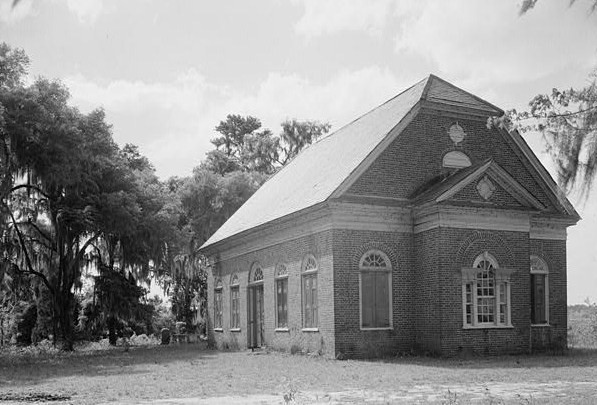
- Pompion Hill Chapel

- Location within South Carolina Location within the United States
- Location: 0.5 mi. SW of jct. of SC 41 and 402, Huger, South Carolina
- Coordinates: 33°5′12″N 79°50′12″W
- Area: 5 acres (2.0 ha)
- Built: 1763
- Architectural style: Georgian
- NRHP reference No.: 70000567

Significant dates
- Added to NRHP: April 15, 1970
- Designated NHL: April 15, 1970

Pompion (pronounced "punkin") Hill Chapel is small "back parish" church near Huger, South Carolina. Built in 1763, it is a virtually unaltered example of a brick Georgian parish church, retaining interior and exterior finishes. It was declared a National Historic Landmark in 1970.

== Description and history ==
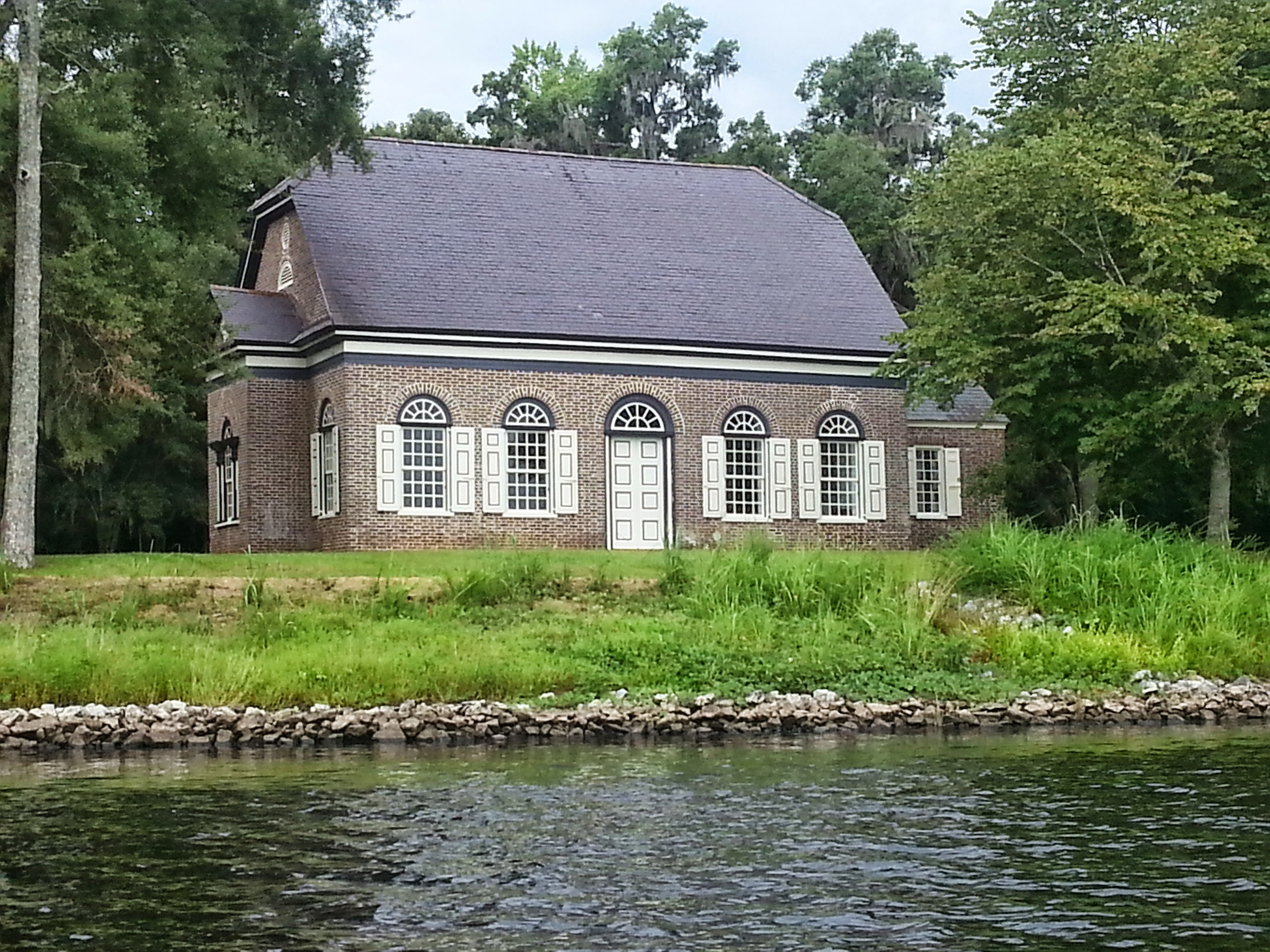
Pompion Hill Chapel, 0.5 miles southwest of the junction of South Carolina Highways 41 and 402 HugerA view from the river

The Pompion Hill Chapel is located in a rural area, overlooking the Cooper River a few miles southwest of the hamlet of Huger. It is a rectangular brick building, with a clipped-gable roof, measuring 35 by 48 feet (11 m × 15 m). The brick is laid in Flemish bond, and the roof is original slate. It has matching entrances on the long sides, at the center of the five-bay facades. The doors and windows are all set in openings with rounded arch tops, the windows topped by fanlights. A small chancel area projects from the building's eastern end, topped by a gable roof, and with a Palladian window in its eastern wall. It is built in Georgian style.

The interior has a brick floor, laid in a herringbone pattern, with crossing aisles laid in red tile placed diagonally. The walls are plaster, rising to a cove ceiling. The interior woodwork and furnishings, including pews and pulpit are all original. The only significant alteration to the building is the reconstruction of the vestry at its western end, which was done using the original bricks.

The chapel was built in 1763-65, and was the second church to stand on the site. When the Province of South Carolina became officially Anglican (Episcopalian) in 1706, the church built here was the seat of St. Thomas' Parish, one of nine into which the province was divided. This church replaced the original wooden church, and was built by mason William Axson, with bricks provided by Zachariah Villepontoux from the nearby Parnassus Plantation.

== See also ==
- List of National Historic Landmarks in South Carolina
- National Register of Historic Places listings in Berkeley County, South Carolina
