= The Barrows, South Carolina =

Settlement in South Carolina, United States

Coordinates: 33°08′27″N 80°03′49″W

The Barrows is an unincorporated community in Berkeley County, in the U.S. state of South Carolina.

== History ==
The community was so named on account of barrows (tumuli) near the original town site.
