= Huger, South Carolina =

Unincorporated community in South Carolina, US

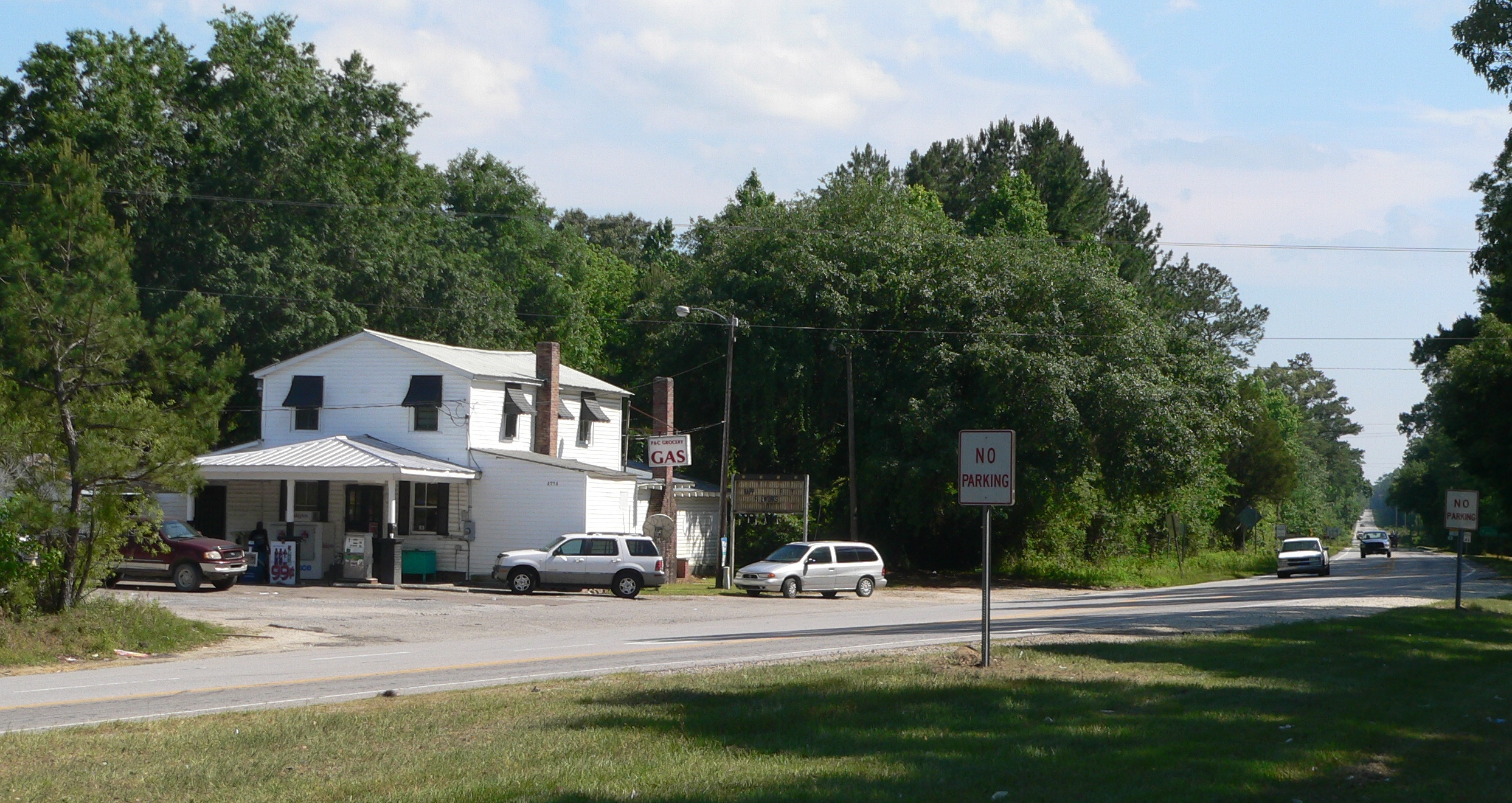
Downtown Huger: intersection of South Carolina Highways 41 and 402

Huger (locally /ˈhuːdʒi/ HOO-jee) is an unincorporated community in Berkeley County, South Carolina, United States. It is part of the Charleston–North Charleston–Summerville Metropolitan Statistical Area. The ZIP Code for Huger is 29450.

The Cainhoy Historic District, Middleburg Plantation, Pompion Hill Chapel, Quinby Plantation House-Halidon Hill Plantation, and White Church are listed on the National Register of Historic Places.
