= Strawberry, South Carolina =

Unincorporated community in South Carolina, US

Coordinates: 33°05′30″N 80°01′50″W

Strawberry is an unincorporated community in Berkeley County, in the U.S. state of South Carolina.

== History ==
A post office called Strawberry was established in 1879, and remained in operation until it was discontinued in 1936. Strawberry was originally the name of a nearby plantation.
