= Cooper River (South Carolina) =

Tidal river of South Carolina, United States

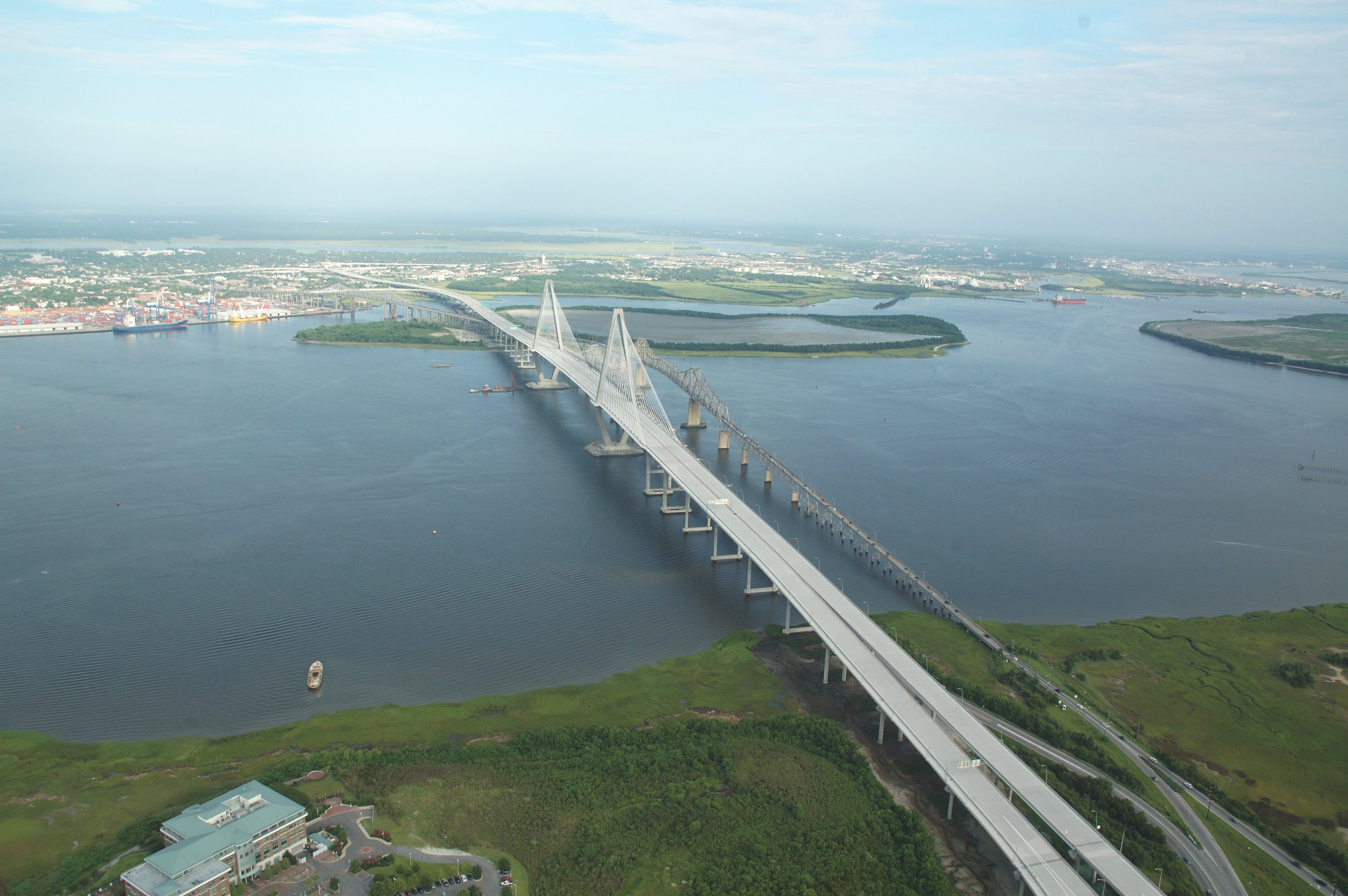
- The Arthur Ravenel Jr. Bridge over the Cooper River in Charleston, South Carolina

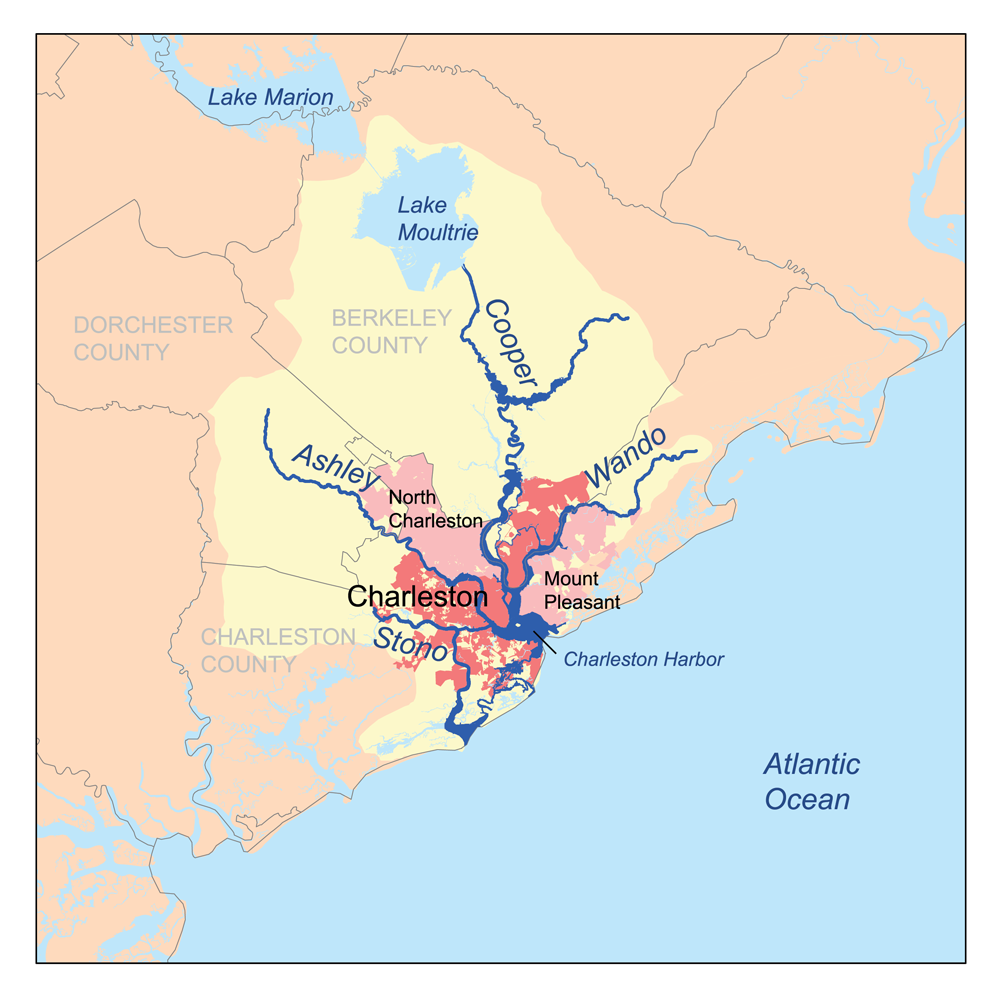
- Map of the Charleston Harbor watershed showing Cooper River.

- Location of outlet.

Location
- Country: United States
- State: South Carolina
- County: Berkeley, Charleston

Physical characteristics
- Source
  - coordinates: 33°04′01″N 79°55′23″W
- Mouth
  - location: Charleston Harbor, Atlantic Ocean
  - coordinates: 32°45′43″N 79°54′14″W
  - elevation: 0 ft (0 m)

The Cooper River is a mainly tidal river in the U.S. state of South Carolina. The cities of Mt. Pleasant, Charleston, North Charleston, Goose Creek, Moncks Corner, and Hanahan are located along the river. Short and wide, the river is joined first by the blackwater East Branch and then farther downstream at the tidal Wando River. Almost immediately thereafter, the Cooper River widens into its estuary and unites with the Ashley River to form the Charleston Harbor.

Long used as an important commercial waterway, the West Branch of the Cooper River was initially connected to the Santee River near its navigation head by the Santee Canal, built in the late 18th century. Though the West Branch still rises as a blackwater swamp in central Berkeley County, its main headwaters have been shifted to Lake Moultrie by the 1940s vintage Tail Race Canal. Lake Moultrie is, in turn, fed from Lake Marion by a diversion canal built around the same time period. This artificial rerouting of the Cooper River basin has essentially unified the Santee and Cooper River systems into a single hydrological drainage entity.

The river was named for Anthony Ashley Cooper, 1st Earl of Shaftesbury and chief Lord Proprietor of the Carolina Colony. Charleston was founded on the western bank of the Ashley River in 1670 (at Charles Towne Landing), before moving across to its current peninsular location ten years later.

Rice and indigo were the primary commodity crops cultivated on the plantations surrounding the brackish marshland of the Cooper River from the early Colonial through the end of the Civil War periods. Former plantations along the river include Lewisfield, Mulberry, Middleburg, Quinby and Mepkin, which is now operated as Mepkin Abbey, a Trappist monastery. Many of these and other structures contribute to the Cooper River Historic District, a national historic district that encompasses areas along both branches of the river. In addition to the Mepkin Abbey Botanical Garden, nearby attractions include the Cypress Gardens and the Old Santee Canal Park.

Daniel Island and Drum Island (uninhabited) are adjacent to the river. Cargo terminals, a paper mill, and the former Charleston Naval Base line its shore. The Patriot's Point naval and maritime museum is located at the mouth of the river. Berthed at Patriot's Point are four museum ships, most notably the USS Yorktown, a World War II aircraft carrier.

Goose Creek, a tributary of the Cooper River, was the site of a U.S. Navy submarine base through the late 1990s. It operated as a nuclear weapons handling facility servicing fleet ballistic submarines until the advent of the larger Trident submarine-launched ballistic missile. Since the Ohio-class submarines required a deeper draft, the nuclear weapons handling had to move to another facility.

== Crossings ==
Formerly traffic across the river was limited to ferries. The John P. Grace Memorial Bridge was opened for service on August 8, 1929, as automobiles and trucks became an increasingly important mode of transportation. It was named for the commissioner who inspired the state's highway system. The State of South Carolina built a parallel span that opened on April 29, 1966, the Silas N. Pearman Bridge constructed a few yards (meters) to the south. For more than a quarter of a century, the only connection between Charleston and its rapidly growing northern suburb of Mt. Pleasant was by these two bridges. In 1992, the Don Holt Bridge was completed a few miles upriver as part of the I-526 corridor, and became the third bridge to span the river.

The cable-stayed Arthur Ravenel, Jr. Bridge (or "New Cooper River Bridge") opened to traffic on July 16, 2005, to replace the two older bridges. Demolition of the Grace and Pearman bridges began shortly afterwards and was completed in late 2007. A popular 10k run across the bridge is held each spring, and is known as the Cooper River Bridge Run.

The Holt and Ravenel bridges carry all motor vehicular traffic across the river in the Charleston metropolitan area. Further north, the Dennis C. Bishop Bridge carries US 52-US 17 Alternate traffic across the Tail Race canal just below the Pinopolis Dam on Lake Moultrie in northern Berkeley County.

A CSX Transportation trestle bridge traverses the upper reaches of the West Branch, 13 miles (21 km) below the Pinopolis Dam. Another rail bridge crosses the Tail Race Canal less than a mile below the dam.
