= Bethera, South Carolina =

- Unincorporated community
- Location within South Carolina Location within the United States
- Coordinates: 33°12′06″N 79°47′17″W
- Country: United States
- State: South Carolina
- Counties: Berkeley
- Elevation: 49 ft (15 m)
- Time zone: UTC-5 (Eastern (EST))
  - Summer (DST): UTC-4 (EDT)
- Area codes: 843, 854
- GNIS feature ID: 1246810

Bethera is an unincorporated community in Berkeley County in the Lowcountry of South Carolina about 40 miles (64 km) north of Charleston. The elevation of the community is 49 feet (15 m)

== History ==
The name "Bethera" is an amalgamation of the names of two local churches, namely Bethel Baptist and Berea Methodist.

In 1925, Bethera had 22 inhabitants.
