= Bonneau Beach, South Carolina =

- Census-designated place
- Location within the state of South Carolina
- Coordinates: 33°19′21″N 79°59′43″W
- Country: United States
- State: South Carolina
- County: Berkeley

Area
  - Total: 2.39 sq mi (6.18 km^{2})
  - Land: 2.35 sq mi (6.08 km^{2})
  - Water: 0.042 sq mi (0.11 km^{2})
- Elevation: 79 ft (24 m)

Population (2020)
  - Total: 1,982
  - Density: 845.0/sq mi (326.25/km^{2})
- Time zone: UTC-5 (Eastern (EST))
  - Summer (DST): UTC-4 (EDT)
- ZIP code: 29431
- Area codes: 843, 854
- FIPS code: 45-07535
- GNIS feature ID: 2584530

Bonneau Beach is a census-designated place (CDP) in Berkeley County, South Carolina, United States. The population was 1,929 at the 2010 census. It is located on the shore of Lake Moultrie.

== Demographics ==
Historical population
Census	Pop.	Note	%±
2020	1,982		—
U.S. Decennial Census
