= Pringletown, South Carolina =

- Unincorporated community
- Location within South Carolina Location within the United States
- Coordinates: 33°08′38″N 80°18′21″W
- Country: United States
- State: South Carolina
- County: Berkeley
- Named after: Pringle family
- Elevation: 56 ft (17 m)
- Time zone: UTC-5 (Eastern (EST))
  - Summer (DST): UTC-4 (EDT)
- ZIP code: 29472
- Area code: 843 and 854
- GNIS feature ID: 1250248

Pringletown is an unincorporated community in Berkeley County, South Carolina, United States. It is located along Old Gilliard Road (SC 27), north of Interstate 26 (exit 187). Formally spelled "Pringle Town," the community was named after the Pringle family, which lived in the area.

The community is the closest populated place to both the MacDougall Correctional Institution, located north along Old Gilliard Road, and the Volvo Cars - South Carolina Factory, located east via Autonomous Drive.
