= Santee Canal =

- U.S. National Register of Historic Places
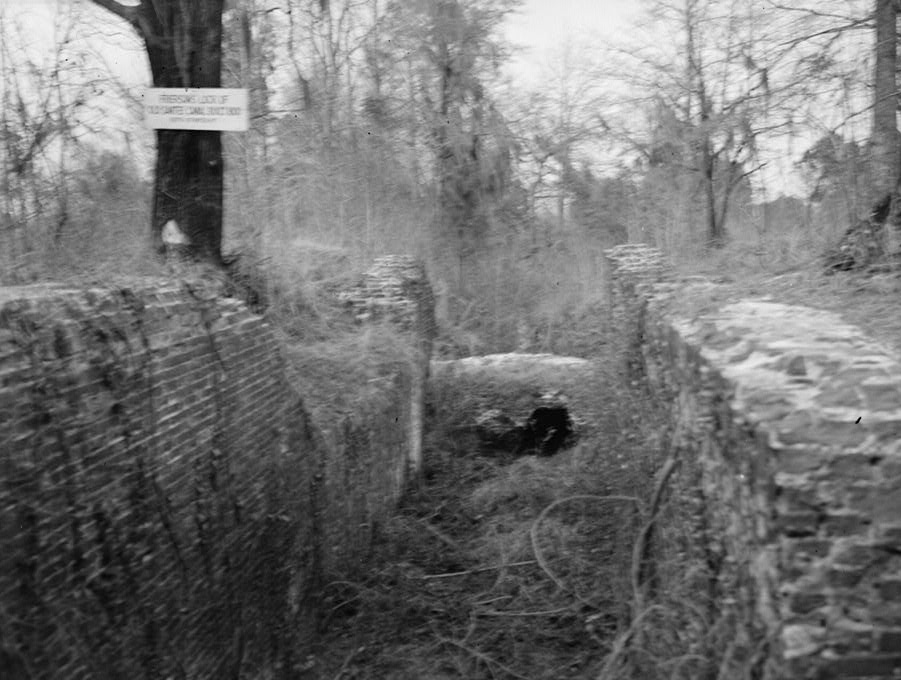
- Frierson's Lock on the Old Santee Canal

- Location within South Carolina Location within the United States
- Location: Berkeley County, South Carolina, US
- Nearest city: Moncks Corner, South Carolina
- Coordinates: 33°25′36″N 80°6′7″W
- Area: 50 acres (20 ha)
- Built: 1793-1800
- Architect: Col. John Christian Senf
- NRHP reference No.: 82003833
- Added to NRHP: August 11, 1982

The Santee Canal was one of the earliest canals built in the United States. It was built to provide a direct water route between Charleston and Columbia, the new state capital of South Carolina. It was named to the National Register of Historic Places in 1982.

== History ==
In 1786, the South Carolina General Assembly chartered a company to construct and maintain an inland canal linking the Cooper River near Charleston with the Santee River. The Santee River connects to the Congaree River and the City of Columbia. Construction started in 1793, directed by Engineer Col. John Christian Senf. It opened in 1800.

It was 22 miles (35 km) long. It had two double locks and eight single locks. Its width was 35 feet (11 m) at the water's surface and 20 feet (6.1 m) at the bottom. Its depth was 4 feet (1.2 m).

Due to sparse traffic, poor construction, and droughts, the canal was not a financial success. The construction of railroads sealed its fate. It lost its state charter in 1853 and was not used after 1865. Much of it was later covered by the Lake Moultrie reservoir.

Additional pictures and information are available from the Historic American Buildings Survey at the Library of Congress. Old Santee Canal Park is located in Moncks Corner, South Carolina. The park is situated at Stony Landing, the former southernmost section of the canal.

== See also ==
- List of canals in the United States
