= Sangaree, South Carolina =

- Census-designated place
- Location within South Carolina Location within the United States
- Coordinates: 33°01′58″N 80°07′20″W
- Country: United States
- State: South Carolina
- County: Berkeley

Area
  - Total: 2.03 sq mi (5.26 km^{2})
  - Land: 2.03 sq mi (5.26 km^{2})
  - Water: 0 sq mi (0.00 km^{2})
- Elevation: 72 ft (22 m)

Population (2020)
  - Total: 7,781
  - Density: 3,830.3/sq mi (1,478.89/km^{2})
- Time zone: UTC-5 (Eastern (EST))
  - Summer (DST): UTC-4 (EDT)
- Area codes: 843, 854
- GNIS feature ID: 2584535

Sangaree is a census-designated place and unincorporated community in Berkeley County, South Carolina, United States. Its population was 8,220 as of the 2010 census.

Sangaree has a public library, a branch of the Berkeley County Library System.

== Demographics ==
Historical population
Census	Pop.	Note	%±
2020	7,781		—
U.S. Decennial Census

=== 2020 census ===
Sangaree racial composition
Race	Num.	Perc.
White (non-Hispanic)	4,733	60.83%
Black or African American (non-Hispanic)	1,714	22.03%
Native American	45	0.58%
Asian	86	1.11%
Pacific Islander	4	0.05%
Other/Mixed	476	6.12%
Hispanic or Latino	723	9.29%

As of the 2020 United States census, there were 7,781 people, 2,836 households, and 2,148 families residing in the CDP.
