= Middleburg Plantation =

Historic house in South Carolina, United States

- U.S. National Register of Historic Places
- U.S. National Historic Landmark
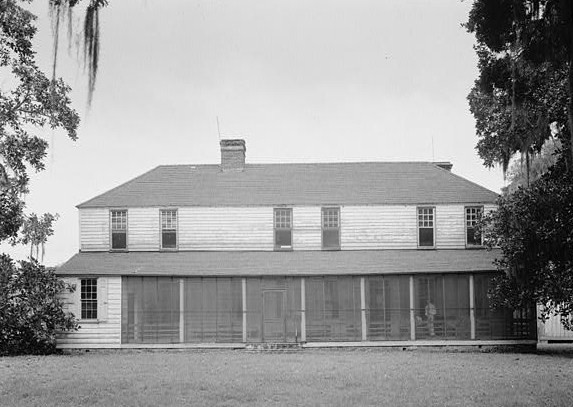
- Middleburg Plantation, HABS photo, 1940

- Location within South Carolina Location within the United States
- Location: 2 miles southwest of Huger on the East Branch of the Cooper River, near Huger, South Carolina
- Coordinates: 33°4′52″N 79°50′35″W
- Area: 400 acres (160 ha)
- Built: 1699
- Architectural style: Colonial
- NRHP reference No.: 70000568

Significant dates
- Added to NRHP: April 15, 1970
- Designated NHL: April 15, 1970

Middleburg Plantation is a historic colonial-era plantation on the Cooper River near Huger, South Carolina. The plantation house, built in 1697 by the French Huguenot Benjamin Simons, is probably the oldest standing wood-frame building in South Carolina, and is consequently an architecturally important example of period construction. It was declared a National Historic Landmark in 1970.

== Description and history ==
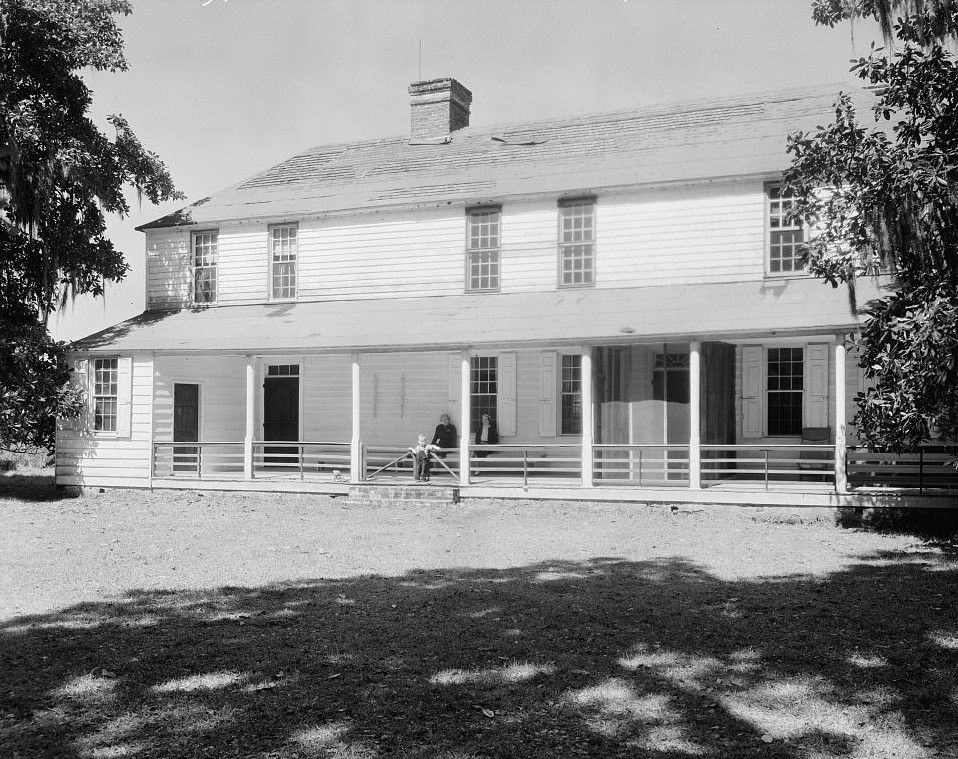
Middleburg Plantation

Middleburg Plantation is located southwest of Huger, between Cainhoy Road and the Cooper River. The plantation occupies about 400 acres (160 ha) of lowlands fronting on the river. The main house is a two-story timber-frame structure, measuring about 64 by 20 feet (19.5 m × 6.1 m). It is topped by a hip roof, and is three rooms wide and one deep, with single-story porches on both of its long sides. The walls are sheathed in wooden clapboards, and it has two chimneys. Its plan is a precursor to what became the typical Charleston "single house". Each floor has three rooms, with the stairwell on the north side of the central room, and a narrow hallway extending on the upper level's north side. Exterior walls are plastered, and floors are made of wide boards. Extending to the west is an ell that was added in the late 18th century, the last significant alteration to the building.

Middleburg was established in 1699 by Benjamin Simons, a French Huguenot refugee, who named it after the Dutch city of Middelburg, the capital of the Province of Zeeland, Walcheren Island where Simons fled to from France before crossing the Ocean to America. At the time of its designation as a National Historic Landmark in 1970, the house was still in the hands of Simons' descendants. The plantation includes two later outbuildings: a 19th-century carriage house with fine jigsawn woodwork, and a brick commissary building that includes a slave jail in its rear.

== See also ==
- List of the oldest buildings in South Carolina
- List of National Historic Landmarks in South Carolina
- National Register of Historic Places listings in Berkeley County, South Carolina
