= Jamestown, South Carolina =

- Town
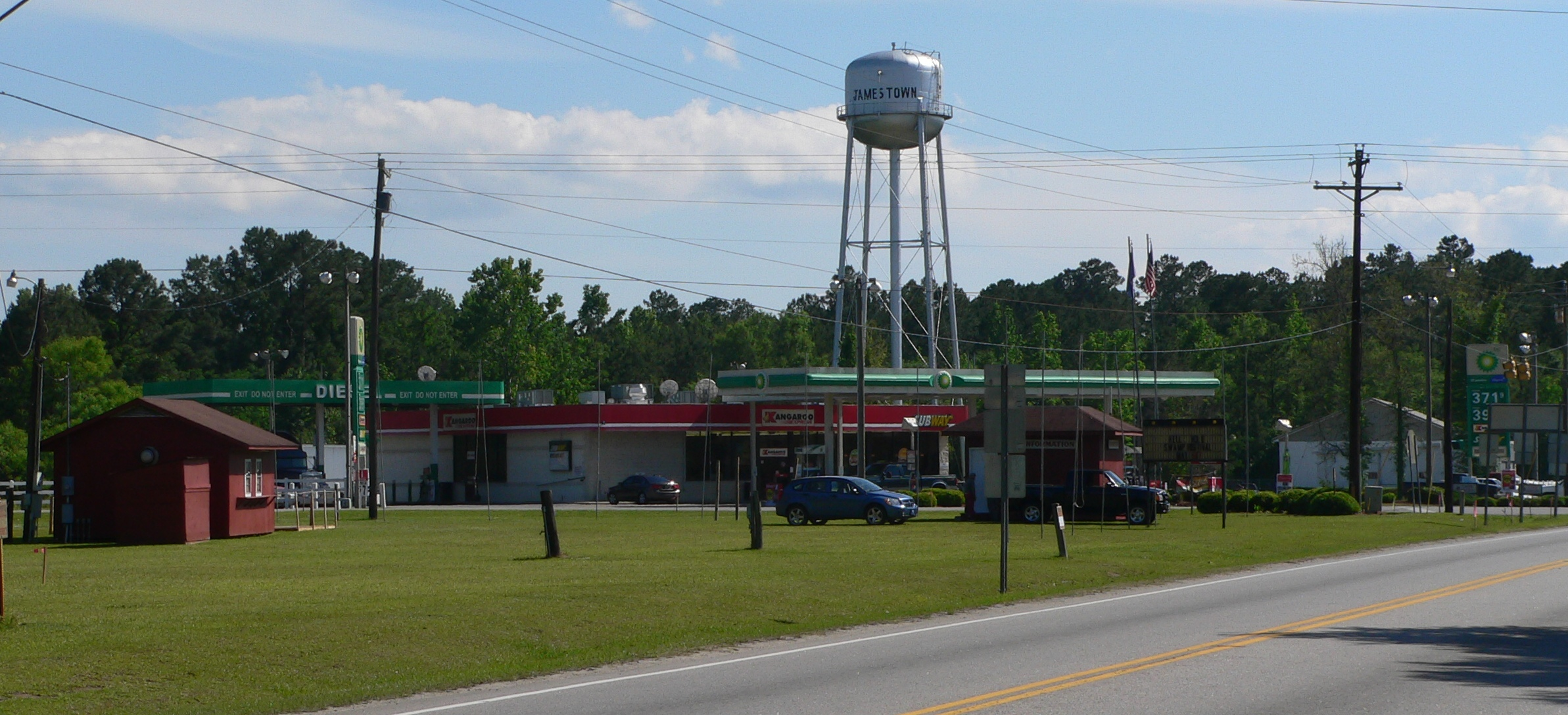
- Downtown Jamestown

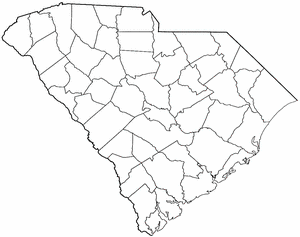
- Location of Jamestown, South Carolina
- Coordinates: 33°17′09″N 79°41′41″W
- Country: United States
- State: South Carolina
- County: Berkeley

Area
  - Total: 0.61 sq mi (1.57 km^{2})
  - Land: 0.61 sq mi (1.57 km^{2})
  - Water: 0 sq mi (0.00 km^{2})
- Elevation: 36 ft (11 m)

Population (2020)
  - Total: 68
  - Density: 112.3/sq mi (43.35/km^{2})
- Time zone: UTC-5 (Eastern (EST))
  - Summer (DST): UTC-4 (EDT)
- ZIP code: 29453
- Area codes: 843, 854
- FIPS code: 45-36475
- GNIS feature ID: 2405903
- Website: https://www.jamestownsc.gov/

Jamestown is a town in Berkeley County, South Carolina, United States. As of the 2020 census, Jamestown had a population of 68.

Jamestown is included within the Charleston-North Charleston-Summerville metropolitan area.

== History ==
Originally settled by Huguenot refugees from France in the 17th century, the area was established as St. James Santee in 1706, the first parish of the Church of England in Carolina outside Charleston.

== Geography ==
Jamestown is located in northeastern Berkeley County 1 mile (1.6 km) south of the Santee River. U.S. Route 17 Alternate passes through the town, leading east 29 miles (47 km) to Georgetown and west 21 miles (34 km) to Moncks Corner, the Berkeley County seat. South Carolina Highway 41 leads south from Jamestown 32 miles (51 km) to Mount Pleasant in the Charleston area and north 14 miles (23 km) to Andrews. The town is within Francis Marion National Forest.

According to the United States Census Bureau, Jamestown has a total area of 0.62 square miles (1.6 km^{2}), all of it land.

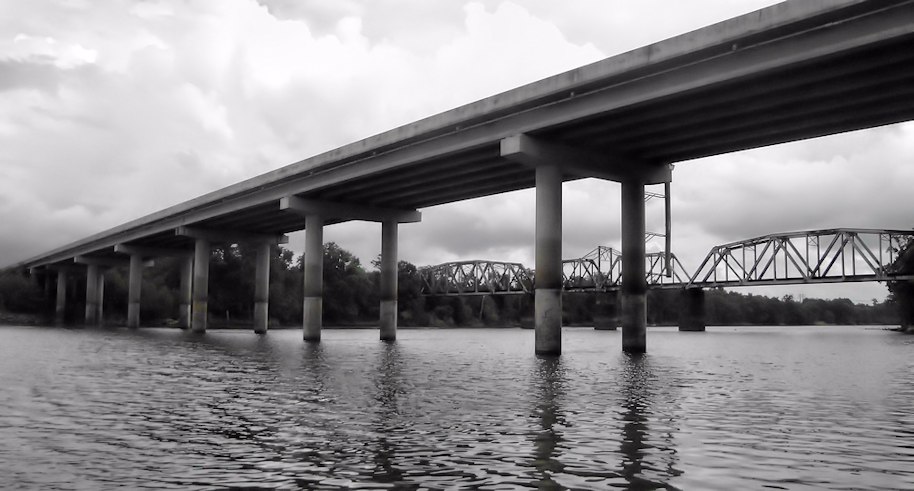
Bridge over the Santee River near boat ramp north of Jamestown

== Demographics ==
Historical population
Census	Pop.	Note	%±
1960	184		—
1970	190		3.3%
1980	193		1.6%
1990	84		−56.5%
2000	97		15.5%
2010	72		−25.8%
2020	68		−5.6%
U.S. Decennial Census

As of the census of 2000, there were 97 people, 42 households, and 28 families residing in the town. The population density was 168.7 inhabitants per square mile (65.1/km^{2}). There were 51 housing units at an average density of 88.7 per square mile (34.2/km^{2}). The racial makeup of the town was 55.67% White, 43.30% African American, 1.03% from other races. Hispanic or Latino of any race were 1.03% of the population.

There were 42 households, out of which 33.3% had children under the age of 18 living with them, 35.7% were married couples living together, 31.0% had a female householder with no husband present, and 31.0% were non-families. 28.6% of all households were made up of individuals, and 14.3% had someone living alone who was 65 years of age or older. The average household size was 2.31 and the average family size was 2.83.

In the town, the population was spread out, with 27.8% under the age of 18, 5.2% from 18 to 24, 28.9% from 25 to 44, 23.7% from 45 to 64, and 14.4% who were 65 years of age or older. The median age was 39 years. For every 100 females, there were 73.2 males. For every 100 females age 18 and over, there were 75.0 males.

The median income for a household in the town was $16,250, and the median income for a family was $13,542. Males had a median income of $19,375 versus $16,875 for females. The per capita income for the town was $7,021. There were 41.9% of families and 52.5% of the population living below the poverty line, including 91.9% of under eighteens and none of those over 64.

== Events ==
Every year Jamestown holds the Hell Hole Swamp Festival on the first full weekend in May. It is a family event with children's games, cocoa-spitting contest (organizers say tobacco was discontinued due to lack of participation), horseshoe pitching, arm wrestling, beauty contests, a parade, talent contest, exhibits (including a confiscated moonshine still, which is also the festival's logo), and arts and crafts. The festival started in 1972, and 2011 was the 40th anniversary. A 10k Gator Run began in 1976 and is billed as the oldest road race in South Carolina; winners get real alligator heads as trophies.

== Reputation as a speed trap ==
Jamestown has garnered a reputation as a speed trap for motorists. As of 2009, Jamestown generates 62% of its annual operating budget ($195,000 of $313,000) through writing tickets. Jamestown uses its placement along an alternate route to popular vacation destination Myrtle Beach to trap unwary drivers. Entering the town, the speed limit drops from 55 miles per hour (89 km/h) to 40 miles per hour (64 km/h). Many motorists complain that the speed limit change is poorly marked along with poorly marked pedestrian cross walks. Jamestown police officers often sit in convenience store or church parking lots near the intersection of SC Route 41 and U.S. Highway 17-A, particularly at night, and catch drivers as they slow down to turn. Speeding tickets in Jamestown generally run anywhere from $180 to $300, and drivers can usually avoid having points added to their license by paying anywhere from $50 to $200 extra.
