= Lake Marion (South Carolina) =

Largest lake in South Carolina, United States

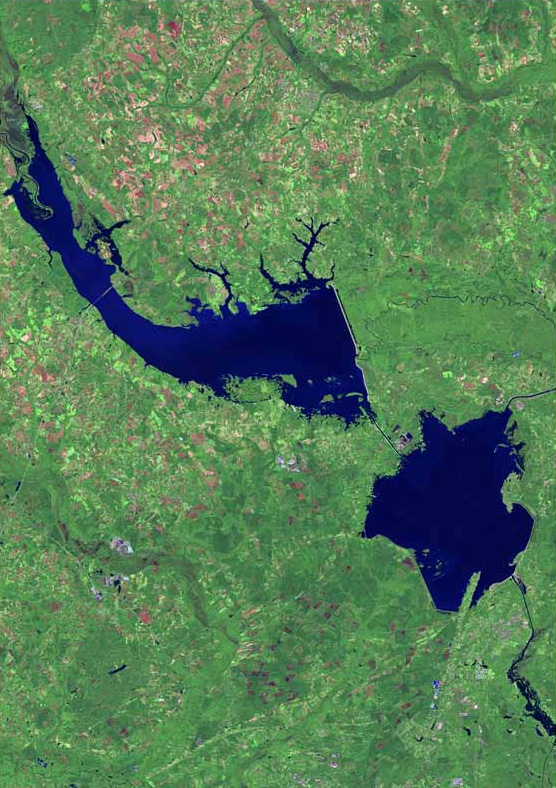
- Lake Marion (top) and Lake Moultrie (bottom right) from space

- Location within South Carolina
- Location: Clarendon / Orangeburg / Berkeley / Calhoun / Sumter counties, South Carolina, US
- Coordinates: 33°27′14″N 80°09′50″W
- Type: reservoir
- Basin countries: United States
- Surface area: 110,000 acres (45,000 ha)
- Average depth: 13.12 ft (4.00 m)
- Max. depth: 76.77 ft (23.40 m)
- Surface elevation: 75 ft (23 m)

Lake Marion is a large man-made lake in central South Carolina. It has a 315-mile (507 km) shoreline and covers nearly 110,000 acres (450 square kilometers or 173.7 square miles) of rolling farmlands, former marshes, and river valley landscape. With territory spanning five counties, the lake is referred to as South Carolina's inland sea.

The Santee River was dammed in the 1940s to supply hydroelectric power, as part of the rural electrification efforts initiated under President Franklin D. Roosevelt's New Deal during the Great Depression. This created Lake Marion, one of the fifty largest lakes in the United States, whether natural or man-made reservoirs. At current capacity it is only about a third of the area of what, if filled to capacity, would be the fifteenth largest lake in the U.S.

== History ==
Lake Marion was created by the construction of the Santee Dam in November 1941, part of the state-owned electric and water utility Santee Cooper's Hydroelectric and Navigation Project. The project also included construction of the Pinopolis Dam (Cooper River Dam) to create Lake Moultrie, immediately downstream, and a diversion canal seven and a half miles long to connect the two. This was one of the infrastructure projects supported by President Franklin D. Roosevelt during the Great Depression to provide jobs and invest in the future.

The dam at Wilson's Landing is eight miles long and has 62 Tainter gates. Despite its size, the Santee Dam generates only 1.92 megawatts of hydropower. Hydroelectric facilities at Pinopolis Dam were designed to produce the lion's share of power under the original scheme: it generates about 128 megawatts. In 1985, as part of a large-scale rediversion and redesign, the United States Army Corps of Engineers installed the St. Stephen Dam hydro facility to recapture lost generating capacity of another 84 megawatts.

Lake Marion is fed by many tributaries, including Wyboo Creek and the Santee River, and also by numerous springs, including Eutaw Springs. The lake is named for the American Revolutionary War General Francis Marion, known legendarily as the "Swamp Fox". His former home of Pond Bluff was one of those flooded when the lake was created.

== Location ==
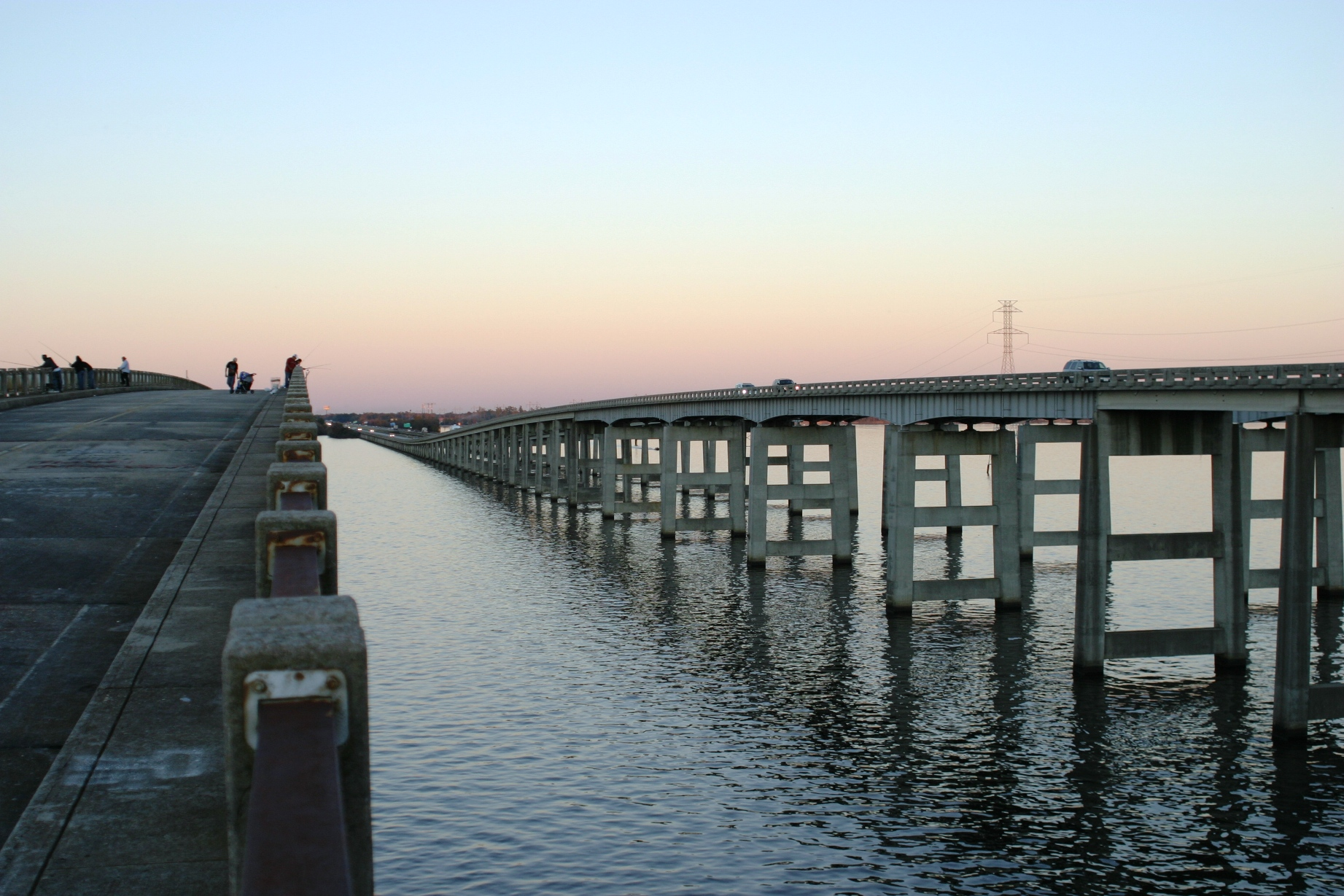
Interstate 95 bridge over Lake Marion, Santee, SC; the old bridge (left) is now a pedestrian bridge and fishing pier

The lake is located in five South Carolina counties: Berkeley, Calhoun, Clarendon, Orangeburg, and Sumter.

Public access is provided through several public boat ramps, Santee State Park, and the Santee National Wildlife Refuge. Interstate 95 (As well as U.S. Routes 15 and 301 which are Concurrent with I-95) cross the man-made lake near the town of Santee.

Lake Marion is home to several communities and camps for youth and students. Religious groups, fraternal organizations, and rowing teams come to Lake Marion each spring and summer due to its sheltered location, calm waters, and temperate climate.

== Fish and wildlife ==
The state fishing record for largemouth bass (16.2 lbs) was set at this lake. Other fish that abound are striped bass, white perch, white bass, crappie, channel catfish, Arkansas blue catfish, shellcrackers, bream and chain pickerel (jack).

Wildlife at Lake Marion include deer, fox, squirrel, turtle, dove, wild turkey, alligator, and various species of duck, hawk, eagle, egret, and osprey.

Conditions vary from shallow swamps and blackwater ponds to vast open water, with a multitude of underwater structures. The area was not completely cleared when Lake Marion was created. As a result, there are many stumps, standing dead tree trunks, and live cypress trees.

== See also ==
- Lake Moultrie
- List of lakes in South Carolina
