= Lake Moultrie =

Man-made reservoir in South Carolina, United States

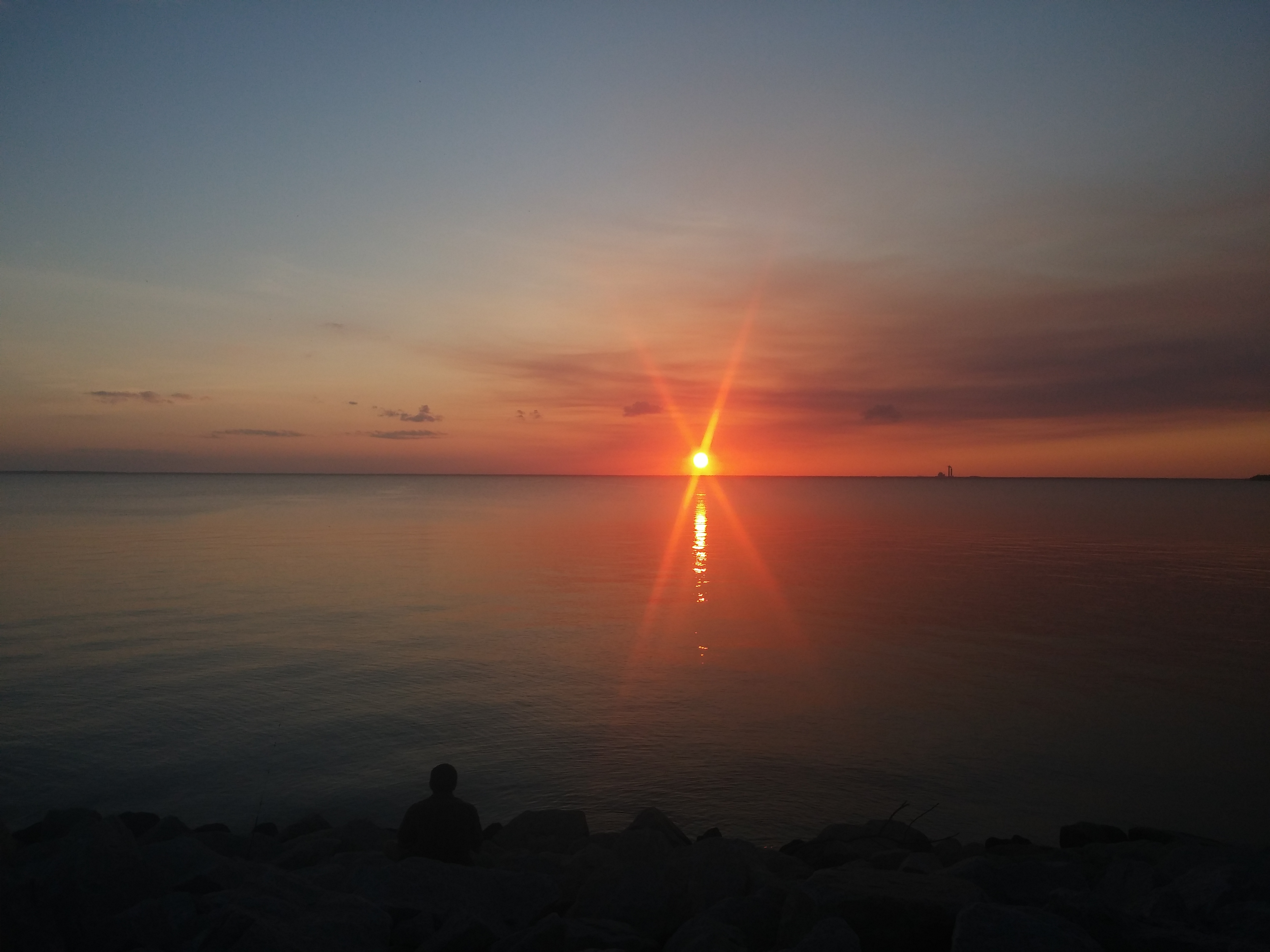
- Sunset at Lake Moultrie from the southeast shore

- Location within South Carolina
- Location: Berkeley County, South Carolina
- Coordinates: 33°18′N 80°3′W
- Type: reservoir
- Basin countries: United States
- Surface area: 60,000 acres (240 km^{2})
- Average depth: 18.7 feet (5.7 m)
- Max. depth: 75.46 feet (23.00 m)
- Surface elevation: 69 ft (21 m)

Lake Moultrie is a large man-made lake in South Carolina. Created in the 1940s by a state utility project to provide electricity to rural South Carolina by damming the Santee River, it covers more than 60,000 acres (240 km^{2}). The third-largest lake in the state, it provides a wide variety of recreational opportunities, including fishing.

== Location ==
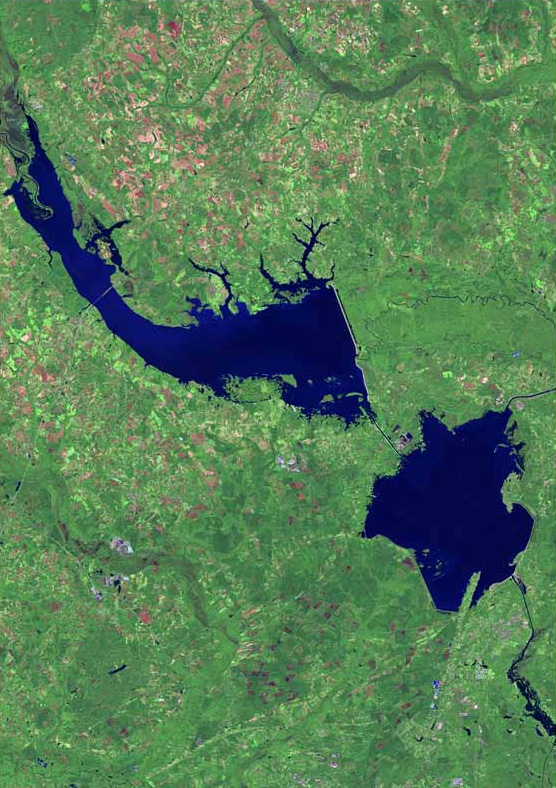
Lake Moultrie (bottom right) and Lake Marion (top) from space

Lake Moultrie is located in Berkeley County, South Carolina. It is fed by the Santee River through Lake Marion and a diversion canal.

Nearby towns include Moncks Corner, Bonneau Beach, Cross, and St. Stephen.

== History ==
Lake Moultrie was created in the early 1940s by the South Carolina Public Service Authority. It was formed by construction of Pinopolis Dam as part of a flood control and hydroelectric power project. It didn't dam the Cooper River but a tributary created by the damming of the Santee River on Lake Marion. It covers about 60,000 acres (240 km^{2}). It was named for Governor William Moultrie. The reservoir or lake offers extensive recreational opportunities as well.

== Fishing ==
Lake Moultrie offers a varied fishing environment. It has areas of shallow swamps, blackwater ponds, thousands of tree stumps and live cypress trees, as well as large open areas of water. This lake does not form ice in the winter. A world-record channel catfish weighing 58 lb (26 kg) was caught from this lake. The lake also holds the state record for black crappie (5 lb; 2.3 kg).

== See also ==
- Lake Marion
- List of lakes in South Carolina
