= Moncks Corner, South Carolina =

- Town
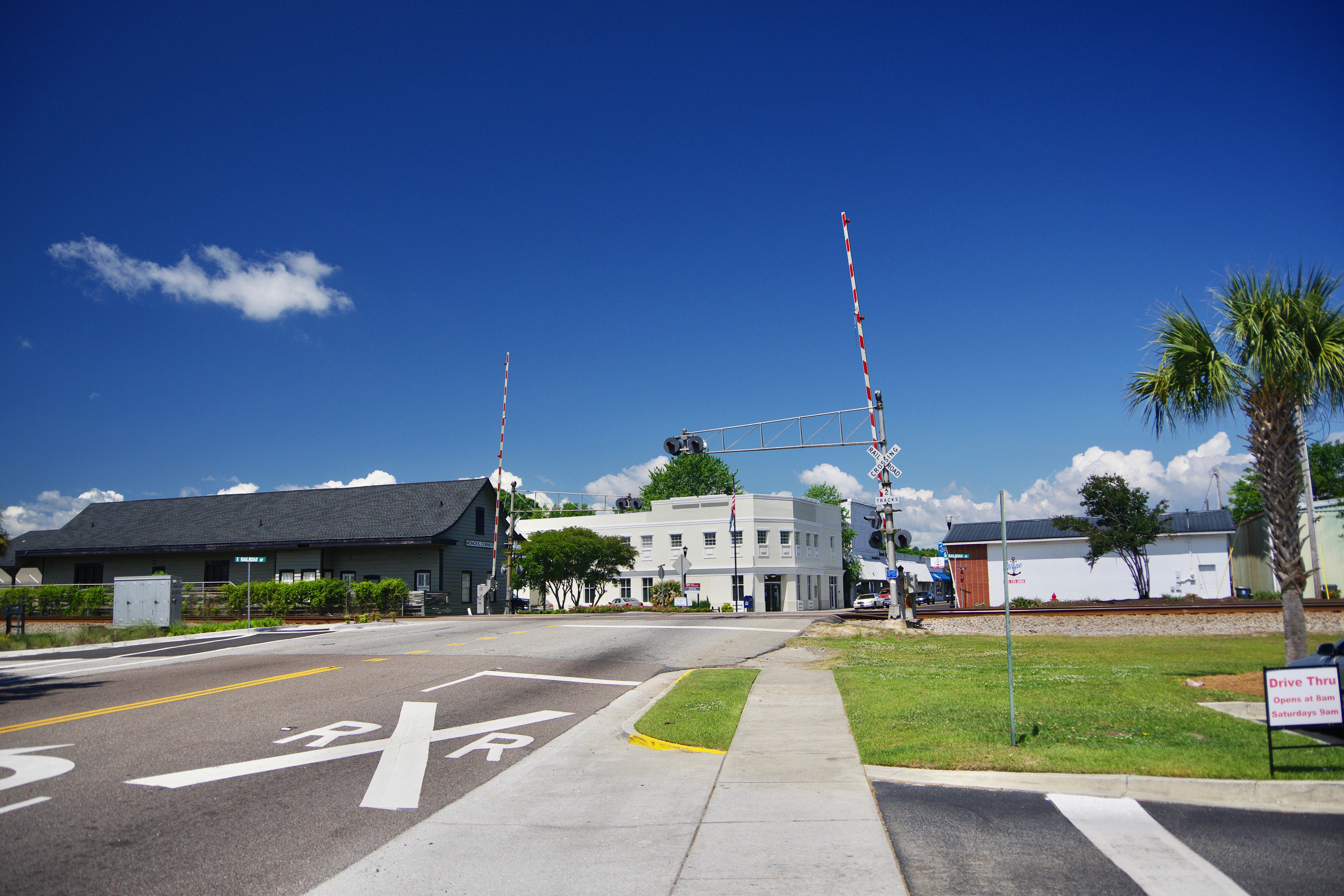
- Level crossing on Main Street

- Flag Seal
- Nickname: "The Lowcountry's Hometown"
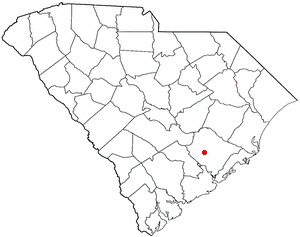
- Location of Moncks Corner, South Carolina
- Coordinates: 33°11′34″N 80°00′17″W
- Country: United States
- State: South Carolina
- County: Berkeley

Government
  - Type: Mayor–council

Area
  - Total: 11.50 sq mi (29.79 km^{2})
  - Land: 11.37 sq mi (29.46 km^{2})
  - Water: 0.13 sq mi (0.33 km^{2})
- Elevation: 33 ft (10 m)

Population (2020)
  - Total: 13,297
  - Density: 1,169.1/sq mi (451.41/km^{2})
- Time zone: UTC−5 (Eastern (EST))
  - Summer (DST): UTC−4 (EDT)
- ZIP codes: 29430, 29461
- Area codes: 843, 854
- FIPS code: 45-47275
- GNIS feature ID: 2406176
- Website: www.monckscornersc.gov

Moncks Corner is a town in and the county seat of Berkeley County in South Carolina, United States. It lies south of Lake Moultrie in the Charleston metropolitan area. As of the 2020 census, the town had a population of 13,297.

== History ==
The area in which Moncks Corner lies was historically occupied by the Edisto people, a sub-tribe of the Cusabo. Descendants of the Edisto form part of the Wassamasaw Tribe of Varnertown Indians, a community located between Moncks Corner and Summerville. The 1,500-member tribe was recognized by the state as an Indian tribe in 2009.

During the colonial era, Moncks Corner became a major settlement area of French Protestant Huguenots, who came to South Carolina between 1684 and 1688 as refugees due to religious persecution in France. Many family surnames in Berkeley and adjacent counties are of French origin. The Huguenots soon began to intermarry with the English colonists.

The town of Moncks Corner dates back to 1728 and is named for landowner Thomas Monck. The town began as a trading post with a few taverns and stores. The Battle of Monck's Corner was fought here in 1780, associated with the Siege of Charleston.

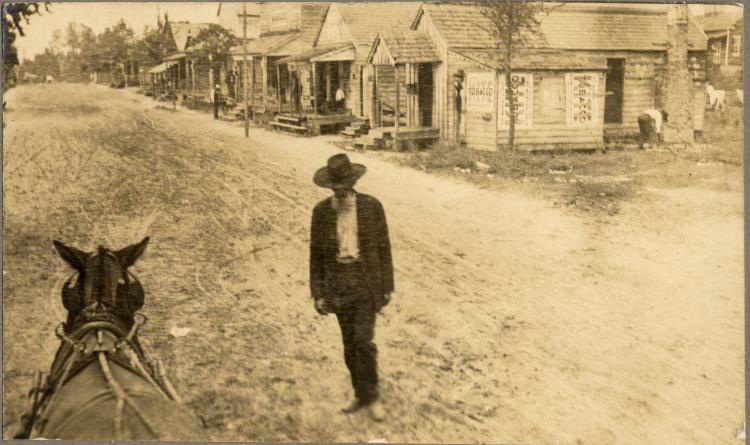
Street view of Moncks Corner, 1904

The Northeastern Railroad, which ran between Charleston, South Carolina, and Siler City, North Carolina, laid its tracks in 1856, and the train depot became the center of the new town of Moncks Corner. The town of Moncks Corner was chartered on December 26, 1885, and incorporated December 15, 1909.

Moncks Corner was granted the trademark "Capital of Santee Cooper Country" by the South Carolina Secretary of State September 9, 1999, and again October 21, 2004. The trademark is a symbol of its abundant outdoor activities, such as horseback riding, hiking, water sports, boating and freshwater fishing. Moncks Corner is also the home of Santee Cooper's corporate office complex.

The Biggin Church Ruins, Cooper River Historic District, Lewisfield Plantation, Mulberry Plantation, Santee Canal, and Strawberry Chapel and Childsbury Town Site are listed on the National Register of Historic Places.

== Geography ==
Moncks Corner is located near the center of Berkeley County. Its boundary extends east to the West Branch of the Cooper River, 3 miles (5 km) south of the outlet of Lake Moultrie.

US 52 is the main highway through the town, leading south 32 miles (51 km) to Charleston and north 80 miles (130 km) to Florence. When the new highway was completed in 1975, it split the historic Perry Hill community in two. US 17 Alt also passes through the town, leading east 49 miles (79 km) to Georgetown and southwest 16 miles (26 km) to Summerville. SC 6 leads northwest from Moncks Corner along the south and west sides of Lakes Moultrie and Marion 39 miles (63 km) to I-95 at Santee.

According to the United States Census Bureau, Moncks Corner has a total area of 7.4 square miles (19.2 km^{2}), of which 7.3 square miles (18.9 km^{2}) is land and 0.12 square miles (0.3 km^{2}), or 1.81%, is water.

== Climate ==
Moncks Corner is a humid subtropical climate (Cfa) according to the Köppen climate classification system. The town's climate is similar to that of Charleston, of which it is a suburb. However, due to the distance from the coast compared to Charleston, it is noticeably hotter in the summer.

Climate data for Moncks Corner, South Carolina (1991–2020 Normals, extremes 1994–present)
Month	Jan	Feb	Mar	Apr	May	Jun	Jul	Aug	Sep	Oct	Nov	Dec	Year
Record high °F (°C)	83 (28)	87 (31)	90 (32)	92 (33)	102 (39)	102 (39)	104 (40)	105 (41)	97 (36)	98 (37)	89 (32)	83 (28)	105 (41)
Mean maximum °F (°C)	76.6 (24.8)	78.7 (25.9)	84.2 (29.0)	89.3 (31.8)	94.1 (34.5)	98.8 (37.1)	99.7 (37.6)	99.4 (37.4)	94.9 (34.9)	89.7 (32.1)	83.5 (28.6)	78.9 (26.1)	100.9 (38.3)
Mean daily maximum °F (°C)	58.7 (14.8)	61.8 (16.6)	68.7 (20.4)	77.5 (25.3)	84.3 (29.1)	89.9 (32.2)	93.1 (33.9)	91.1 (32.8)	86.0 (30.0)	77.6 (25.3)	68.3 (20.2)	61.0 (16.1)	76.5 (24.7)
Daily mean °F (°C)	48.6 (9.2)	51.1 (10.6)	57.3 (14.1)	65.4 (18.6)	73.3 (22.9)	80.1 (26.7)	83.4 (28.6)	81.8 (27.7)	76.7 (24.8)	67.2 (19.6)	57.4 (14.1)	50.9 (10.5)	66.1 (19.0)
Mean daily minimum °F (°C)	38.4 (3.6)	40.5 (4.7)	45.9 (7.7)	53.2 (11.8)	62.4 (16.9)	70.3 (21.3)	73.7 (23.2)	72.4 (22.4)	67.4 (19.7)	56.8 (13.8)	46.5 (8.1)	40.8 (4.9)	55.7 (13.2)
Mean minimum °F (°C)	20.4 (−6.4)	25.9 (−3.4)	30.1 (−1.1)	37.9 (3.3)	47.6 (8.7)	59.6 (15.3)	65.4 (18.6)	65.3 (18.5)	56.2 (13.4)	41.5 (5.3)	29.9 (−1.2)	26.2 (−3.2)	19.6 (−6.9)
Record low °F (°C)	13 (−11)	11 (−12)	20 (−7)	30 (−1)	40 (4)	48 (9)	58 (14)	55 (13)	45 (7)	30 (−1)	22 (−6)	15 (−9)	11 (−12)
Average precipitation inches (mm)	3.66 (93)	3.44 (87)	3.49 (89)	3.03 (77)	3.56 (90)	5.42 (138)	6.76 (172)	6.25 (159)	5.82 (148)	4.10 (104)	2.87 (73)	3.92 (100)	52.32 (1,330)
Average precipitation days	8.8	9.1	8.3	7.7	8.2	10.4	11.9	11.9	8.9	7.5	7.4	9.6	109.7
Source: NOAA (mean maxima/minima 2006–2020)

== Demographics ==
Historical population
Census	Pop.	Note	%±
1890	118		—
1900	202		71.2%
1910	232		14.9%
1920	309		33.2%
1930	623		101.6%
1940	1,165		87.0%
1950	1,818		56.1%
1960	2,030		11.7%
1970	2,314		14.0%
1980	4,179		80.6%
1990	5,607		34.2%
2000	5,952		6.2%
2010	7,885		32.5%
2020	13,297		68.6%
2025 (est.)	20,612	▲	55.0%
U.S. Decennial Census

=== 2020 census ===
As of the 2020 census, Moncks Corner had a population of 13,297. The median age was 32.9 years. 28.8% of residents were under the age of 18 and 10.6% of residents were 65 years of age or older. For every 100 females there were 93.7 males, and for every 100 females age 18 and over there were 89.6 males age 18 and over.

68.6% of residents lived in urban areas, while 31.4% lived in rural areas.

There were 4,598 households in Moncks Corner, of which 43.9% had children under the age of 18 living in them. Of all households, 49.5% were married-couple households, 14.5% were households with a male householder and no spouse or partner present, and 29.6% were households with a female householder and no spouse or partner present. About 20.2% of all households were made up of individuals and 7.3% had someone living alone who was 65 years of age or older.

There were 4,902 housing units, of which 6.2% were vacant. The homeowner vacancy rate was 1.8% and the rental vacancy rate was 6.5%.

Moncks Corner racial composition
Race	Num.	Perc.
White (non-Hispanic)	7,297	54.88%
Black or African American (non-Hispanic)	4,397	33.07%
Native American	59	0.44%
Asian	169	1.27%
Pacific Islander	10	0.08%
Other/Mixed	634	4.77%
Hispanic or Latino	731	5.5%

=== 2000 census ===
As of the census of 2000, there were 5,952 people, 2,103 households, and 1,491 families residing in the town. The population density was 1,333.1 inhabitants per square mile (514.7/km^{2}). There were 2,334 housing units at an average density of 522.8 per square mile (201.9/km^{2}). The racial makeup of the town was 57.33% White, 36.59% African American, 0.64% Native American, 0.55% Asian, 0.05% Pacific Islander, 2.97% from other races, and 1.86% from two or more races. Hispanic or Latino of any race were 4.20% of the population.

There were 2,103 households, out of which 40.6% had children under the age of 18 living with them, 43.6% were married couples living together, 23.1% had a female householder with no husband present, and 29.1% were non-families. 25.6% of all households were made up of individuals, and 9.6% had someone living alone who was 65 years of age or older. The average household size was 2.61 and the average family size was 3.09.

In the town, the population was spread out, with 28.9% under the age of 18, 10.5% from 18 to 24, 30.0% from 25 to 44, 18.1% from 45 to 64, and 12.5% who were 65 years of age or older. The median age was 32 years. For every 100 females, there were 87.5 males. For every 100 females age 18 and over, there were 81.8 males.

The median income for a household in the town was $31,711, and the median income for a family was $37,335. Males had a median income of $30,634 versus $21,796 for females. The per capita income for the town was $15,202. About 16.5% of families and 17.6% of the population were below the poverty line, including 26.6% of those under age 18 and 11.7% of those age 65 or over.

== Education ==
Moncks Corner has a public library, a branch of the Berkeley County Library System.

== Notable people ==
- Kwame Brown, basketball player
- Omar Brown, National Football League (NFL) player
- Charlamagne tha God (born 1978), radio and TV personality
- Kathryn Dennis, reality TV star (Southern Charm)
- Andre Ellington, NFL player
- Bruce Ellington (born 1991), NFL player
- Steven Furtick, pastor of Elevation Church
- Willie J. Hill Jr. (born 1951), bishop of the Reformed Episcopal Church Diocese of the Southeast
- Robin Kenyatta, jazz musician
- Ryan Stewart, NFL player, 2 Live Stews radio personality with brother Doug
- Isaac Wright Jr. (born 1962), lawyer
