= Berkeley County, South Carolina =

County in South Carolina, United States

- County
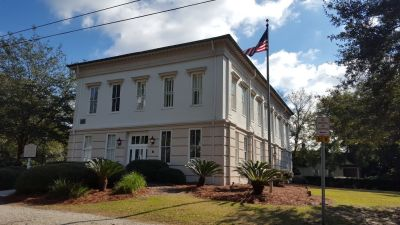
- Old Berkeley County Courthouse

- Seal Logo
- Mottoes: "One Berkeley" "Rich History. Bright Future."
- Location within the U.S. state of South Carolina
- Interactive map of Berkeley County, South Carolina
- Coordinates: 33.21°N 79.95°W
- Country: United States
- State: South Carolina
- Founded: 1882
- Named for: Sir William Berkeley
- Seat: Moncks Corner
- Largest community: Goose Creek

Government
  - County Supervisor: Johnny Cribb

Area
  - Total: 1,233.88 sq mi (3,195.7 km^{2})
  - Land: 1,103.62 sq mi (2,858.4 km^{2})
  - Water: 130.26 sq mi (337.4 km^{2}) 10.56%

Population (2020)
  - Total: 229,861
  - Estimate (2025): 274,666 ▲
  - Density: 208.279/sq mi (80.4170/km^{2})
- Time zone: UTC−5 (Eastern)
  - Summer (DST): UTC−4 (EDT)
- Congressional district: 1st
- Website: www.berkeleycountysc.gov

Berkeley County is a county in the U.S. state of South Carolina. As of the 2020 census, its population was 229,861. Its county seat is Moncks Corner, and the largest community is Goose Creek.

After two previous incarnations of Berkeley County, the current county was created in 1882. Berkeley County is included in the Charleston, South Carolina metropolitan area.

== History ==
Berkeley County was established in 1682. It was named after John and William Berkeley, co-owners of the Province of Carolina. It became part of the Charleston District in 1769. It did not exist as a District during most of the 19th century and generally was part of the Low Country culture.

St. John's Berkeley Parish was a parish that grew with agricultural development using enslaved labor. It was eventually absorbed into what became Berkeley County.

In 1882, after Democrats regained control of the state legislature following the Reconstruction era, they established the current incarnation of Berkeley County, with its seat at Mount Pleasant. The county seat was moved in 1895 to Moncks Corner. Berkeley is also known for Revolutionary War connections. The Old Berkeley County Courthouse was listed on the National Register of Historic Places in 1971.

== Geography ==
According to the U.S. Census Bureau, the county has a total area of 1,233.88 square miles (3,195.7 km^{2}), of which 1,103.62 square miles (2,858.4 km^{2}) is land and 130.26 square miles (337.4 km^{2}), or 10.56%, is water.

=== National protected areas ===
- Francis Marion National Forest (part)
- Hell Hole Bay Wilderness
- Wambaw Creek Wilderness (part)

=== State and local protected areas/sites ===
- Bonneau Ferry Wildlife Management Area
- Canal Wildlife Management Area
- Childsbury Towne Heritage Preserve
- Cypress Gardens
- Hatchery Wildlife Management Area
- Moultrie Hunt Unit Wildlife Management Area
- Old Santee Canal Park
- Site of Francis Marion Tomb
- Wee Tee Wildlife Management Area (part)

=== Major water bodies ===
- Cooper River
- Goose Creek Reservoir
- Lake Marion
- Lake Moultrie
- Santee River
- South Santee River
- Wambaw Creek
- Wando River

=== Adjacent counties ===
- Georgetown County – east
- Williamsburg County – northeast
- Clarendon County – north
- Orangeburg County – northwest
- Dorchester County – west
- Charleston County – south

=== Major highways ===
- I-26
- I-526
- US 17 Alt.
- US 17 Alt. Truck
- US 52
- US 176
- SC 6
- SC 6 Truck
- SC 16
- SC 27
- SC 41
- SC 45
- SC 165
- SC 311
- SC 402

=== Major infrastructure ===
- Seed Orchard Helibase

== Demographics ==
Historical population
Census	Pop.	Note	%±
1890	55,428		—
1900	30,454		−45.1%
1910	23,487		−22.9%
1920	22,558		−4.0%
1930	22,236		−1.4%
1940	27,128		22.0%
1950	30,251		11.5%
1960	38,196		26.3%
1970	56,199		47.1%
1980	94,727		68.6%
1990	128,776		35.9%
2000	142,651		10.8%
2010	177,843		24.7%
2020	229,861		29.2%
2025 (est.)	274,666	▲	19.5%
U.S. Decennial Census; 1790–1960 1900–1990; 1990–2000 2010 2020

=== Racial and ethnic composition ===
Berkeley County, South Carolina – Racial and ethnic composition Note: the US Census treats Hispanic/Latino as an ethnic category. This table excludes Latinos from the racial categories and assigns them to a separate category. Hispanics/Latinos may be of any race.
Race / Ethnicity (NH = Non-Hispanic)	Pop 1980	Pop 1990	Pop 2000	Pop 2010	Pop 2020	% 1980	% 1990	% 2000	% 2010	% 2020
White alone (NH)	67,793	92,460	95,314	113,553	137,840	71.57%	71.80%	66.82%	63.85%	59.97%
Black or African American alone (NH)	23,064	30,909	37,739	44,023	51,784	24.35%	24.00%	26.46%	24.75%	22.53%
Native American or Alaska Native alone (NH)	172	374	700	910	1,035	0.18%	0.29%	0.49%	0.51%	0.45%
Asian alone (NH)	1,796	2,391	2,636	3,981	5,353	1.90%	1.86%	1.85%	2.24%	2.33%
Native Hawaiian or Pacific Islander alone (NH)	x	x	98	146	173	x	x	0.07%	0.08%	0.08%
Other race alone (NH)	15	43	177	536	1,720	0.02%	0.03%	0.12%	0.30%	0.75%
Mixed race or Multiracial (NH)	x	x	2,052	3,939	11,628	x	x	1.44%	2.21%	5.06%
Hispanic or Latino (any race)	1,887	2,599	3,935	10,755	20,328	1.99%	2.02%	2.76%	6.05%	8.84%
Total	94,727	128,776	142,651	177,843	229,861	100.00%	100.00%	100.00%	100.00%	100.00%

=== 2020 census ===
As of the 2020 census, there were 229,861 people and 57,117 families residing in the county. The median age was 36.6 years, with 24.3% of residents under the age of 18 and 14.5% 65 years of age or older. For every 100 females there were 97.8 males, and for every 100 females age 18 and over there were 95.6 males age 18 and over.

The racial makeup of the county was 61.5% White, 22.8% Black or African American, 0.7% American Indian and Alaska Native, 2.4% Asian, 0.1% Native Hawaiian and Pacific Islander, 4.7% from some other race, and 7.9% from two or more races. Hispanic or Latino residents of any race comprised 8.8% of the population.

77.9% of residents lived in urban areas, while 22.1% lived in rural areas.

There were 85,539 households in the county, of which 35.0% had children under the age of 18 living with them and 26.3% had a female householder with no spouse or partner present. About 22.8% of all households were made up of individuals and 8.2% had someone living alone who was 65 years of age or older.

There were 93,623 housing units, of which 8.6% were vacant. Among occupied housing units, 71.7% were owner-occupied and 28.3% were renter-occupied. The homeowner vacancy rate was 1.8% and the rental vacancy rate was 9.3%.

=== 2010 census ===
At the 2010 census, there were 177,843 people, 65,419 households, and 47,141 families living in the county. The population density was 161.8 inhabitants per square mile (62.5/km^{2}). There were 73,372 housing units at an average density of 66.8 per square mile (25.8/km^{2}). The racial makeup of the county was 66.5% white, 25.0% black or African American, 2.3% Asian, 0.6% American Indian, 0.1% Pacific islander, 2.8% from other races, and 2.7% from two or more races. Those of Hispanic or Latino origin made up 6.0% of the population.

Of the 65,419 households, 38.0% had children under the age of 18 living with them, 51.3% were married couples living together, 15.3% had a female householder with no husband present, 27.9% were non-families, and 22.0% of households were made up of individuals. The average household size was 2.66 and the average family size was 3.10. The median age was 34.5 years.

The median household income was $50,777 and the median family income was $56,869. Males had a median income of $40,534 versus $30,997 for females. The per capita income for the county was $22,865. About 9.9% of families and 12.6% of the population were below the poverty line, including 18.2% of those under age 18 and 10.3% of those age 65 or over.

=== 2000 census ===
At the 2000 census, there were 142,651 people, 49,922 households, and 37,691 families living in the county. The population density was 130 people per square mile (50 people/km^{2}). There were 54,717 housing units at an average density of 50 per square mile (19/km^{2}). The racial makeup of the county was 68.00% White, 26.63% Black or African American, 0.52% Native American, 1.87% Asian, 0.08% Pacific Islander, 1.20% from other races, and 1.70% from two or more races. 2.76% of the population were Hispanic or Latino of any race. 16.4% were of American, 10.0% German, 8.4% Irish and 7.7% English ancestry according to Census 2000. Of the 49,922 households 39.20% had children under the age of 18 living with them, 56.70% were married couples living together, 14.20% had a female householder with no husband present, and 24.50% were non-families. 19.40% of households were one person and 5.60% were one person aged 65 or older. The average household size was 2.75 and the average family size was 3.15.

The age distribution was 28.00% under the age of 18, 11.70% from 18 to 24, 31.20% from 25 to 44, 21.20% from 45 to 64, and 7.90% 65 or older. The median age was 32 years. For every 100 females, there were 103.20 males. For every 100 females age 18 and over, there were 102.20 males.

The median household income was $39,908 and the median family income was $44,242. Males had a median income of $31,583 versus $22,420 for females. The per capita income for the county was $16,879. About 9.70% of families and 11.80% of the population were below the poverty line, including 15.60% of those under age 18 and 12.90% of those age 65 or over.

== Government and politics ==
County government (as of 2025):

Berkeley County Council:

- District 1: Dan Owens (R)
- District 2: Jarrod Brooks (R)
- District 3: Phillip Obie II (R)
- District 4: Tommy Newell (R)
- District 5: Amy Stern (R)
- District 6: Marshall West (R)
- District 7: Caldwell Pinckney, Jr. (D)
- District 8: Steve Davis (D)

Other Elected Officials:

- 9th Circuit Solicitor: Scarlett A Wilson (R)
- County Auditor: Janet Brown Jurosko (R)
- County Supervisor: Johnny Cribb (R)
- Clerk of Court: Leah Guerry Dupree (R)
- County Coroner: Darnell Hartwell (R)
- Probate Judge: Hon. Keith Kornahrens (R)
- Register of Deeds: Cindy Forte (R)
- Sheriff: S. Duane Lewis (R)
- Treasurer: Carolyn Umphlett (R)

In 2020, Joe Biden received 43.3% of the vote, the best performance for a Democrat since Jimmy Carter in 1976.

United States presidential election results for Berkeley County, South Carolina
Year	Republican		Democratic		Third party(ies)	
Year	No.	%	No.	%	No.	%
1892	1,171	52.30%	1,037	46.32%	31	1.38%
1896	183	25.96%	513	72.77%	9	1.28%
1900	112	19.18%	472	80.82%	0	0.00%
1904	115	14.74%	665	85.26%	0	0.00%
1908	235	27.84%	609	72.16%	0	0.00%
1912	5	1.47%	323	94.72%	13	3.81%
1916	6	1.30%	457	98.70%	0	0.00%
1920	24	4.20%	548	95.80%	0	0.00%
1924	26	4.93%	501	95.07%	0	0.00%
1928	42	13.21%	276	86.79%	0	0.00%
1932	22	2.28%	941	97.72%	0	0.00%
1936	8	1.15%	690	98.85%	0	0.00%
1940	91	15.66%	490	84.34%	0	0.00%
1944	32	4.47%	521	72.77%	163	22.77%
1948	58	3.02%	323	16.83%	1,538	80.15%
1952	2,482	59.24%	1,708	40.76%	0	0.00%
1956	1,055	28.24%	902	24.14%	1,779	47.62%
1960	2,422	48.79%	2,542	51.21%	0	0.00%
1964	6,100	63.30%	3,537	36.70%	0	0.00%
1968	4,021	28.89%	5,089	36.56%	4,808	34.55%
1972	9,345	66.66%	4,497	32.08%	177	1.26%
1976	6,981	41.60%	9,741	58.05%	59	0.35%
1980	12,830	55.63%	9,850	42.71%	384	1.66%
1984	16,972	69.24%	7,380	30.11%	159	0.65%
1988	16,779	63.81%	9,312	35.41%	206	0.78%
1992	18,048	50.87%	12,533	35.33%	4,898	13.81%
1996	17,691	53.22%	13,358	40.18%	2,193	6.60%
2000	24,796	57.24%	17,707	40.88%	813	1.88%
2004	32,104	60.65%	20,142	38.05%	691	1.31%
2008	36,205	55.89%	27,755	42.84%	821	1.27%
2012	38,475	56.42%	28,542	41.85%	1,178	1.73%
2016	44,587	56.07%	30,705	38.61%	4,225	5.31%
2020	57,397	54.95%	45,223	43.29%	1,838	1.76%
2024	64,777	57.41%	46,416	41.14%	1,641	1.45%

== Economy ==
In 2022, the GDP of Berkeley County was $10.6 billion (approx. $46,147 per capita). In chained 2017 dollars, its real GDP was $9 billion (about $39,335 per capita). From 2022 through 2024, its unemployment rate has fluctuated around 3%.

As of April 2024, some of the largest employers in the county include Blackbaud, Booz Allen Hamilton, Nucor, Publix, Volvo Cars, and Walmart.

Employment and Wage Statistics by Industry in Berkeley County, South Carolina
Industry	Employment Counts	Employment Percentage (%)	Average Annual Wage ($)
Accommodation and Food Services	6,306	10.6	23,088
Administrative and Support and Waste Management and Remediation Services	2,507	4.2	41,756
Agriculture, Forestry, Fishing and Hunting	96	0.2	62,504
Arts, Entertainment, and Recreation	1,031	1.7	28,808
Construction	3,757	6.3	72,072
Finance and Insurance	1,519	2.6	79,092
Health Care and Social Assistance	4,243	7.1	57,096
Information	1,886	3.2	124,384
Management of Companies and Enterprises	376	0.6	95,680
Manufacturing	9,406	15.8	79,976
Mining, Quarrying, and Oil and Gas Extraction	132	0.2	78,156
Other Services (except Public Administration)	2,238	3.8	56,888
Professional, Scientific, and Technical Services	5,911	9.9	91,988
Public Administration	2,964	5.0	51,636
Real Estate and Rental and Leasing	889	1.5	75,556
Retail Trade	8,271	13.9	36,036
Transportation and Warehousing	3,881	6.5	59,956
Utilities	1,517	2.6	92,560
Wholesale Trade	2,487	4.2	70,824
Total	59,417	100.0%	62,118

== Education ==
All of the county is in the Berkeley County School District.

== Attractions ==
- Cypress Gardens
- Mepkin Abbey
- Berkeley County Museum and Heritage Center

== Communities ==
=== Cities ===
- Charleston (mostly in Charleston County)
- Goose Creek (largest community)
- Hanahan
- North Charleston (partly in Dorchester County and Charleston County)

=== Towns ===
- Bonneau
- Jamestown
- Moncks Corner (county seat)
- St. Stephen
- Summerville (partly in Dorchester County and Charleston County)

=== Census-designated places ===
- Bonneau Beach
- Ladson (partly in Charleston County and Dorchester County)
- Pimlico
- Pinopolis
- Russellville
- Sangaree

=== Unincorporated communities ===
- Bethera
- Cross
- Gumville
- Huger
- Pineville
- Pringletown
- Cane Bay
- Macedonia

== See also ==
- List of counties in South Carolina
- National Register of Historic Places listings in Berkeley County, South Carolina
- Wassamasaw Tribe of Varnertown Indians, state-recognized tribe that resides in the county
