= National Register of Historic Places listings in Berkeley County, South Carolina =

Location of Berkeley County in South Carolina

This is a list of the National Register of Historic Places listings in Berkeley County, South Carolina.

This is intended to be a complete list of the properties and districts on the National Register of Historic Places in Berkeley County, South Carolina, United States. The locations of National Register properties and districts for which the latitude and longitude coordinates are included below, may be seen in a map.

There are 27 properties and districts listed on the National Register in the county, including 5 National Historic Landmarks. Another 2 properties and districts were once listed but have been removed.

This National Park Service list is complete through NPS recent listings posted March 14, 2025.

== Current listings ==
	Name on the Register	Image	Date listed	Location	City or town	Description
1	Biggin Church Ruins	Biggin Church Ruins	December 13, 1977 (#77001215)	2 miles northeast of Moncks Corner on South Carolina Highway 402; 33°12′45″N 79°58′02″W	Moncks Corner	
2	Cainhoy Historic District		March 11, 1982 (#82003832)	Southeast of Huger; 32°55′39″N 79°49′59″W	Huger	
3	Maude Callen Clinic		October 6, 2023 (#100009408)	2669 SC 45; 33°26′25″N 80°03′40″W	Pineville	
4	Cooper River Historic District		February 5, 2003 (#02000571)	Along the East and West Branches of the Cooper River; 33°04′55″N 79°52′35″W	Moncks Corner	
5	Gippy Plantation	Gippy Plantation	June 23, 2016 (#16000414)	366 Avenue of Oaks; 33°10′19″N 80°00′22″W	Moncks Corner vicinity	
6	Keller Site		February 1, 1980 (#80003654)	Address Restricted	St. Stephen	
7	Lawson's Pond Plantation	Lawson's Pond Plantation	December 13, 1977 (#77001213)	5 miles north of Cross off South Carolina Highway 6; 33°22′13″N 80°13′22″W	Cross	
8	Lewisfield Plantation	Lewisfield Plantation	May 9, 1973 (#73001678)	About 2.5 miles south of Moncks Corner on U.S. Route 52; 33°09′36″N 79°59′37″W	Moncks Corner	
9	Loch Dhu	Loch Dhu	September 22, 1977 (#77001214)	North of Cross off South Carolina Highway 6; 33°23′28″N 80°12′49″W	Cross	
10	Medway	Medway	July 16, 1970 (#70000569)	East of Mount Holly off U.S. Route 52; 33°01′52″N 79°58′14″W	Mount Holly	
11	Middleburg Plantation	Middleburg Plantation	April 15, 1970 (#70000568)	2 miles southwest of Huger on the East Branch of the Cooper River; 33°04′54″N 79°50′35″W	Huger	
12	Mulberry Plantation	Mulberry Plantation	October 15, 1966 (#66000697)	Off U.S. Route 52 on the Cooper River; 33°08′37″N 79°59′21″W	Moncks Corner	
13	Otranto Plantation		February 17, 1978 (#78003191)	18 Basilica Ave. 32°58′04″N 80°02′23″W	Hanahan	
14	Otranto Plantation Indigo Vats		December 21, 1989 (#89002150)	Secondary Road 503, east of Goose Creek; 32°59′02″N 79°55′57″W	Goose Creek	
15	Pineville Historic District	Pineville Historic District	February 10, 1992 (#92000024)	Road S-8-204 south of its junction with South Carolina Highway 45; 33°25′33″N 80°01′39″W	Pineville	
16	Pinopolis Historic District North		August 19, 1982 (#82003834)	Lake View St. south to Lake Moultrie; 33°13′52″N 80°02′04″W	Pinopolis	
17	Pinopolis Historic District South		August 19, 1982 (#82003835)	County Road 5; 33°13′52″N 80°02′04″W	Pinopolis	
18	Pompion Hill Chapel	Pompion Hill Chapel	April 15, 1970 (#70000567)	0.5 miles southwest of the junction of South Carolina Highways 41 and 402; 33°05′00″N 79°50′17″W	Huger	
19	Quinby Plantation House-Halidon Hill Plantation		October 10, 1985 (#85003122)	3 miles west of Huger; 33°03′36″N 79°50′18″W	Huger	
20	Richmond Plantation		November 24, 1980 (#80003653)	Southeast of Cordesville; 33°04′43″N 79°51′34″W	Cordesville	
21	William Robertson House	William Robertson House	August 19, 1982 (#82003836)	County Road 5; 33°13′52″N 80°02′14″W	Pinopolis	
22	St. James' Church, Goose Creek	St. James' Church, Goose Creek	April 15, 1970 (#70000566)	South of Goose Creek; 32°58′31″N 80°01′47″W	Goose Creek	
23	St. Stephen's Episcopal Church	St. Stephen's Episcopal Church	April 15, 1970 (#70000570)	On South Carolina Highway 45; 33°24′19″N 79°55′00″W	St. Stephen	
24	Santee Canal	Santee Canal	May 5, 1982 (#82003833)	Northeast of Moncks Corner; 33°21′00″N 80°03′38″W	Moncks Corner	
25	Strawberry Chapel and Childsbury Town Site	Strawberry Chapel and Childsbury Town Site	April 26, 1972 (#72001194)	Southeast of Moncks Corner on County Road 44, north of the Tee of the Cooper River; 33°05′33″N 79°54′12″W	Moncks Corner	
26	Taveau Church	Taveau Church	February 14, 1978 (#78002493)	South of Cordesville on South Carolina Highway 44; 33°06′21″N 79°56′23″W	Cordesville	
27	White Church	White Church	March 23, 1972 (#72001193)	2 miles north of Cainhoy on County Road 98; 32°57′37″N 79°51′29″W	Cainhoy	

== Former listings ==
	Name on the Register	Image	Date listed	Date removed	Location	City or town	Description
1	Calais Milestones		March 14, 1973 (#73001677)	December 8, 2005	On CR 98 and 44	Cainhoy	
2	Dean Hall	Dean Hall	April 7, 1971 (#71001068)	October 7, 1971	SE of Oakley	Oakley	Delisted after being relocated

== See also ==
- List of National Historic Landmarks in South Carolina
- National Register of Historic Places listings in South Carolina
