= Keller =

Keller may refer to:

== People ==
- Keller (surname)
- Keller (given name)

== Places ==
=== United States ===
- Keller, Georgia, an unincorporated community
- Keller, Indiana, an unincorporated community
- Keller, Texas, a city
- Keller, Virginia, a town
- Keller, Washington, an unincorporated community and census-designated place

=== Elsewhere ===
- Keller, Shopian, India, a village
- Keller, Zonguldak, Turkey, a village
- Keller Inlet, Palmer Land, Antarctica
- Keller Lake, Northwest Territories, Canada
- Keller Island, an islet near Ushant, a French island in the English Channel

== Other uses ==
- Keller (automobile)
- Keller beer, a style of beer
- Keller Golf Course, a public golf course in Maplewood, Minnesota, United States
- Keller Graduate School of Management, a former school of DeVry University from 1970 to 1990
- Keller High School, Keller, Texas
- Keller Group, a British-based ground engineering company
- Kevin Keller (character), a fictional character in the Archie Comics universe
- Rachel Keller, a fictional character in The Ring film series

== See also ==
- Keller Ferry, a ferry crossing on Franklin D. Roosevelt Lake in Washington state, United States
- Keller House (disambiguation)
- Tour Keller, a high-rise building in Paris
- Keller's reagent, used in organic chemistry
- Keller Sisters and Lynch, an American pop music group in the 1920s and 1930s
- Gottfried-Keller-Preis, one of the oldest Swiss literary awards
