= Keller Site =

Keller Site may refer to:

- Keller Site (Calion, Arkansas), listed on the National Register of Historic Places in Calhoun County, Arkansas
- Keller Site (St. Stephen, South Carolina), listed on the National Register of Historic Places in Berkeley County, South Carolina

== See also ==
- Keller House (disambiguation)
