= Gippy Plantation =

Historic house in South Carolina, United States

- U.S. National Register of Historic Places
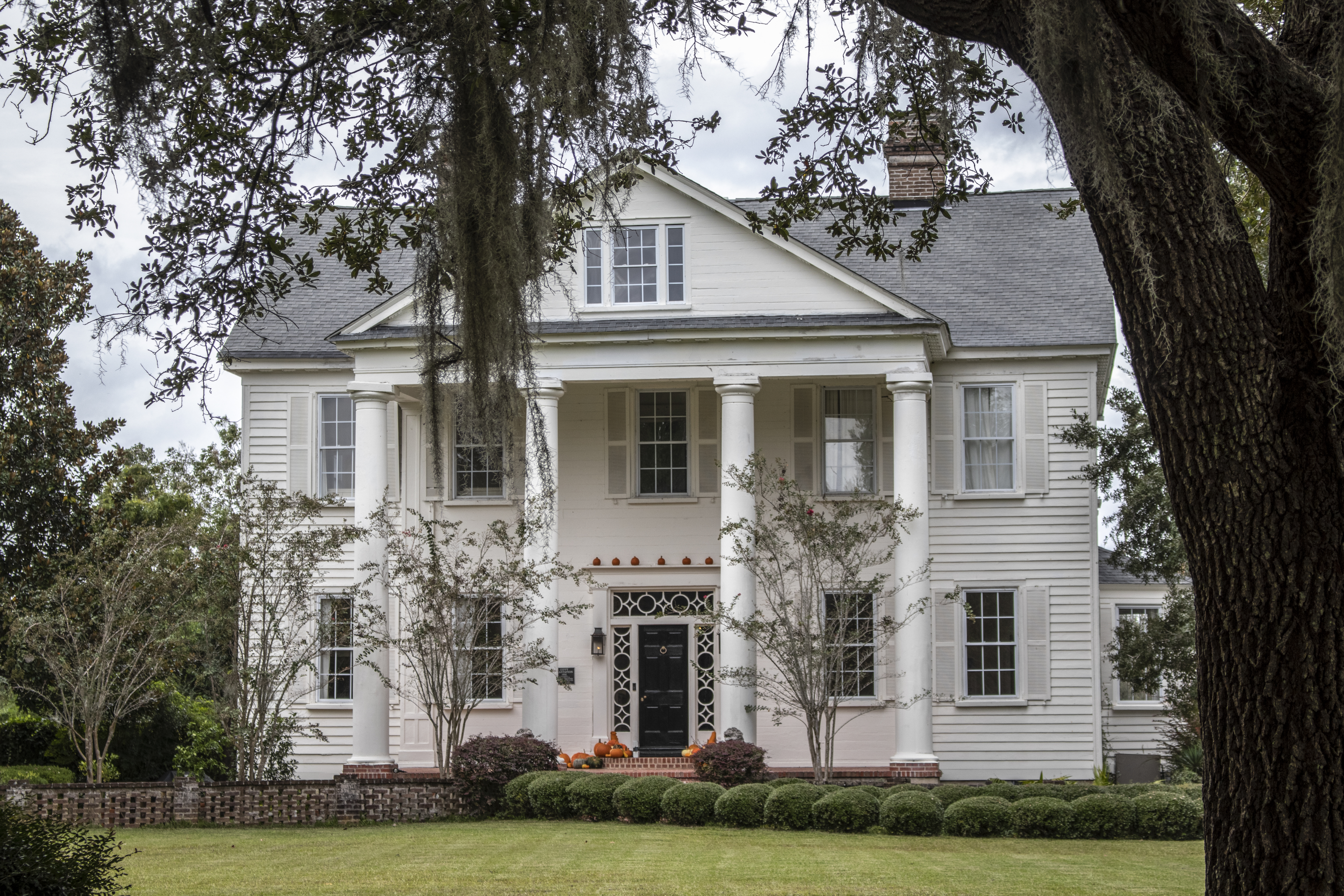

- Location within South Carolina Location within the United States
- Location: 366 Avenue of Oaks, near Moncks Corner, South Carolina
- Coordinates: 33°10′19″N 80°0′22″W
- Area: 4.8 acres (1.9 ha)
- Built: 1850
- NRHP reference No.: 16000414
- Added to NRHP: June 23, 2016

Gippy Plantation is a historic plantation house located at 366 Avenue of Oaks, near Moncks Corner in Berkeley County, South Carolina. The main house is a 2 1/2-story Greek Revival frame structure, with a four-column gabled pediment at the center of its main facade. The house was built by John Sims White, and was at the center of a plantation that was more than 1,800 acres (730 ha) in size. It received restoration and Colonial Revival features in the 1920s.

John Sims White bought the plantation in 1821 and built the current house after an earlier one burned. Mr. White died from typhoid fever in 1865, and his wife remained at the house. In 1895, J. St. Clair White sold Gippy to his cousin Samuel Gaillard Stoney of nearby Medway Plantation, and the plantation continued in active farming until 1910.

Mr. and Mrs. Nicholas G. Roosevelt bought the plantation in 1927 and made some alterations including replacing the earlier square columns with round columns. After Mr. Roosevelt's death, a group of three businessmen purchased about 1200 acres of Gippy in 1972 for about $1 million with an eye toward added industrial uses along Highway 52.

The plantation house was listed in the National Register of Historic Places in 2016.

== See also ==
- National Register of Historic Places listings in Berkeley County, South Carolina
