= Maude E. Callen =

American nurse and midwife

- Born: November 8, 1898; Quincy, Florida
- Died: January 23, 1990 (aged 91); Pineville, South Carolina
- Occupation: Nurse
- Known for: Nurse Midwife

Maude E. Callen (November 8, 1898 in Quincy, Florida – January 23, 1990 in Pineville, South Carolina) was a nurse-midwife in the South Carolina Lowcountry for over 60 years. Her work was brought to national attention in W. Eugene Smith's photo essay "Nurse Midwife," published in Life on December 3, 1951.

== Early life and education ==
Maude E. Callen was born in Quincy, Florida in 1898. She had twelve sisters and was orphaned by the age of six. She was brought up in the home of her uncle Dr. William J. Gunn, a physician in Tallahassee, Florida.

Callen had her primary education at the Saint Michael's and All Angels Parochial Schools. After that, she attended the Florida A&M University in Tallahassee, where she was part of the Alpha Gamma Chi Sorority. She graduated in 1922 and later completed a nursing course at Tuskegee Institute in Alabama. Maude E. Callen also graduated from the Georgia Infirmary in 1921.

Callen devoted her life to nursing in some of the most poverty-stricken areas in the southern United States. By 1923, she had set up her own practice as a nurse-midwife in Berkeley County, one of the poorest in South Carolina at the time. She received additional training from the Georgia Infirmary in Savannah and in tuberculosis care at the Homer G. Phillips Hospital in St. Louis, Missouri.

== Personal life ==
Maude E. Callen married William Dewer Callen in 1921 and they moved together to Pineville, South Carolina, when she was called as a missionary nurse.

== Work as a nurse–midwife ==
A year after graduating from the Georgia Infirmary, Callen moved to Pineville, Berkeley County, South Carolina as an Episcopal missionary nurse. The position was intended to be temporary. She was one of only nine nurse–midwives in South Carolina at the time.

Callen operated a community clinic out of her home, which was miles from any hospital. "It is estimated she delivered between six hundred and eight hundred babies in her sixty-two years of practice." In addition to providing medical services, Callen taught women from the community to be midwives.

She provided in-home services to "an area of some 400 square miles veined with muddy roads", serving as "'doctor, dietitian, psychologist, bail-goer, and friend to thousands of poor (most of them desperately poor) patients — only two percent of whom were white".

Conditions in Berkeley County were difficult:

- "[A]t the edge of Hell Hole Swamp in Pineville houses were still lit by oil lamps, not electricity. Not having power lines meant no telephones, and people went to town by wagon or buggy."
- "Nurse Maude recalled that there were only two cars in Berkeley County and none of the roads were paved. Many of her patients arrived at her home in oxcarts in the middle of the night."
- "[Callen] frequently had to park her car and walk through mud, woods, and creeks to reach her patients."

In 1936, Callen joined the Berkeley County Health Department as a public health nurse. Her job included training midwives throughout the county. She taught young black women the proper practices in prenatal care, labor support, baby delivery, and handling of newborns. "Her duties included vaccinations, examinations, and keeping records on the children's eyes and teeth."

In 1943, Maude Callen was sent to a six-month course at the Maternity Center at the Tuskegee Institute, and received training that was almost as advanced as a doctor's. Because of this, Callen became the second nurse-midwife in South Carolina.

On December 3, 1951, Life magazine published a twelve-page photographic essay of Callen's work by the celebrated photojournalist W. Eugene Smith. Smith spent weeks with Callen at her clinic and on her rounds in the community. Smith is quoted as saying the photographs he took of Nurse Maude were the "most rewarding of all [his] work" and that Callen was "the most completely fulfilled person I have ever known."

On publication of the photo-essay, readers donated more than $20,000 to support Callen's work in Pineville. As a result, the Maude E. Callen Clinic opened in 1953. Callen ran the clinic until her retirement from public health duties in 1971. The Maude E. Callen Clinic reopened as a senior center, serving meals and providing comfort until Callen's death in 1990.

== Work with senior citizens ==
After her retirement in 1971, Callen petitioned county officials to start a Senior Citizens Nutrition Site, which operated, starting in 1980, out of the clinic. As a volunteer, Callen managed the center, which cooked and delivered meals five days a week, and provided car service to seniors needing transportation. In 1983, a CBS News segment of "On the Road" with Charles Kuralt stated: "At 85, Miss Maude serves meals each weekday to some 50 elderly residents, most of them younger than she is." She is quoted as having said, on turning down an invitation from President Reagan to visit the White House, "You can't just call me up and ask me to be somewhere. I've got to do my job."

She continued her volunteer work until her death in 1990.

== Awards and honors ==
- 1981 – Outstanding Older South Carolinian.
- 1981 – Order of the Palmetto by Governor Richard W. Riley.
- 1983 – Featured in a segment of On the Road with Charles Kuralt.
- 1983 – Honorary Doctor of Humanities degree from Clemson University, to honor her "for serving the people of Pineville 'who she birthed, nursed, comforted, sometimes clothed and fed, and even taught to read.'"
- 1984 – The Alexis de Tocqueville Society Award (United Way of America).
- 1984 – The Award for Greatest Public Service Benefiting the Disadvantaged, an award given out annually by Jefferson Awards.
- 1984 - American Institute of Public Service Award.
- 1989 – Honorary degree from the Medical University of South Carolina (MUSC). The MUSC College of Nursing also created the Maude E. Callen Scholarship for nursing students.
- 1998 - The Callen–Lacey Center for Children, an emergency shelter for children in Berkeley County, is dedicated to her memory and that of Dr. William H. Lacey.

Callen also won the Berkeley County Chamber of Commerce’s Honorary Citizen's Award.

== Quotes ==
Let me live in my house by the side of the road and be a friend to man.

— Maude E. Callen,
