= Rembert Dennis =

American politician

Rembert C. Dennis

Member of the South Carolina Senate from the 37th district
- In office 1985–1989
- Preceded by: District created
- Succeeded by: Robert L. Helmly

Member of the South Carolina Senate from the 14th district
- In office 1967–1985
- Preceded by: District created
- Succeeded by: Harvey S. Peeler Jr.

Member of the South Carolina Senate from the Berkeley County district
- In office 1943–1967
- Preceded by: Marvin Meynardie Murray
- Succeeded by: District abolished

Member of the South Carolina House of Representatives from the Berkeley County district
- In office 1939–1943 Serving with Marion Fenton Winter
- Preceded by: Edward Wilson Stevens
- Succeeded by: Mark Elton Mitchum

Personal details
- Born: August 27, 1915 Pinopolis, South Carolina
- Died: June 20, 1992 (aged 76) Moncks Corner, South Carolina
- Party: Democratic
- Spouse: Natalie Brown Dennis
- Children: Rembert, Jr.; Natalie Dorn; E.J.; Mary Mathryn; Luke; and Beatrice
- Occupation: Lawyer

Rembert Coney Dennis (August 27, 1915 – June 20, 1992) was an American politician in the state of South Carolina. He served in the South Carolina Senate as a member of the Democratic Party from 1943 to 1988 and the South Carolina House of Representatives from 1939 to 1942, representing Berkeley County, South Carolina. His family home was Lewisfield Plantation.

Born in Pinopolis, South Carolina, Dennis was the son of Senator Edward James Dennis and Ella Mae (Coney) Dennis. He graduated from Furman University with his Bachelor's in 1935. While he attended Georgetown University Law School in 1936 and 1937, he did not receive a degree there. Instead, he received his law degree from the University of South Carolina in 1940 when he was also admitted to the Bar. Dennis practiced law in Moncks Corner outside of Lake Moultrie in South Carolina from 1940 until his death in 1992.

In 1938, Dennis was elected to the South Carolina House of Representatives for Berkeley County. He was the third generation of the Dennis family to represent Berkeley County after his father Edward James Dennis Sr., and his grandfather Edward James Dennis, Sr.

In 1942, Dennis became a State Senator, a position he would serve in until his retirement in 1988. He served on a number of committees including as Chairman of the Senate Fish, Game, and Forestry Committee from 1967 to 1975 and as the Chairman of the Senate Finance Committee from 1972 to 1988. He also served as the President Pro Tempore of the Senate from 1984 to 1988 after the death of Marion Gressette.

Dennis holds honorary degrees from the Medical University of South Carolina (Doctor of Humane Letters in 1973), the University of South Carolina (Doctor of Law in 1973), Clemson University (Doctor of Law in 1981), The Citadel (Doctor of Law in 1981), and Charleston Southern University (Doctor of Law in 1989).

South Carolina House of Representatives
Preceded by Edward Wilson Stevens	Member of the South Carolina House of Representatives from the Berkeley County district 1939–1943; Served alongside: Marion Fenton Winter	Succeeded by Mark Elton Mitchum
South Carolina Senate
Preceded by Marvin Meynardie Murray	Member of the South Carolina Senate from the Berkeley County district 1943–1967	Succeeded by District abolished
Preceded by District created	Member of the South Carolina Senate from the 14th district 1967–1985	Succeeded by Harvey S. Peeler Jr.
Preceded by District created	Member of the South Carolina Senate from the 37th district 1985–1989	Succeeded by Robert L. Helmly
