= Mulberry Plantation (Moncks Corner, South Carolina) =

Historic house in South Carolina, United States

- U.S. National Register of Historic Places
- U.S. National Historic Landmark
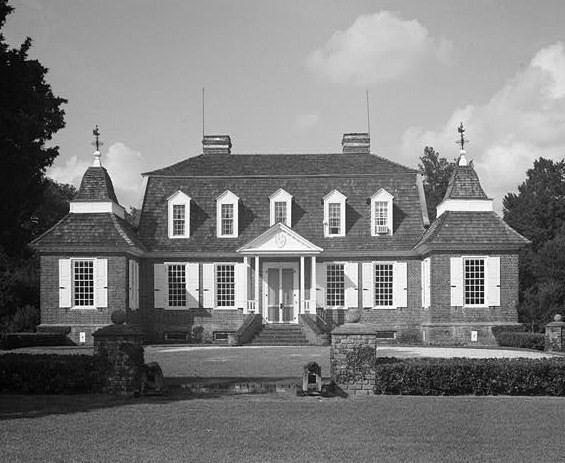
- Mulberry Plantation, 1970s HABS photo

- Location within South Carolina Location within the United States
- Location: Off Old U.S. 52 on Cooper River, Moncks Corner, South Carolina
- Coordinates: 33°8′31″N 80°1′4″W
- Area: 10 acres (4.0 ha)
- Built: 1714
- Architectural style: Colonial, Georgian
- NRHP reference No.: 66000697

Significant dates
- Added to NRHP: October 15, 1966
- Designated NHL: October 9, 1960

Mulberry Plantation is a historic plantation property in rural Berkeley County, South Carolina. Located between Moncks Corner and Charleston, this property was developed in 1714 by Thomas Broughton, who became the Royal governor of South Carolina, and is one of the oldest plantation homes in the United States. Its rice fields, dikes and canals were well-preserved into the 20th century. The plantation house and ten surrounding acres were declared a National Historic Landmark in 1963.

== Description and history ==
Mulberry Plantation is set on the southern shore of the Cooper River, between it and Old United States Route 52. The main house is a two-story brick building, with a gambrel roof. At each corner of the main block stand engaged single-story square pavilions, topped by pyramidal roofs. The main entrance is sheltered by a gabled portico.

The plantation was probably established around 1714, but may not have been founded until 1725, and was built in what was at the time a frontier area on the site of a fortification for defense against Native American attack. This plantation was used as a defensive site during the Yamasee War (1715–17). The plantation house is a rare little-altered example of high-style early Georgian architecture in the nation.

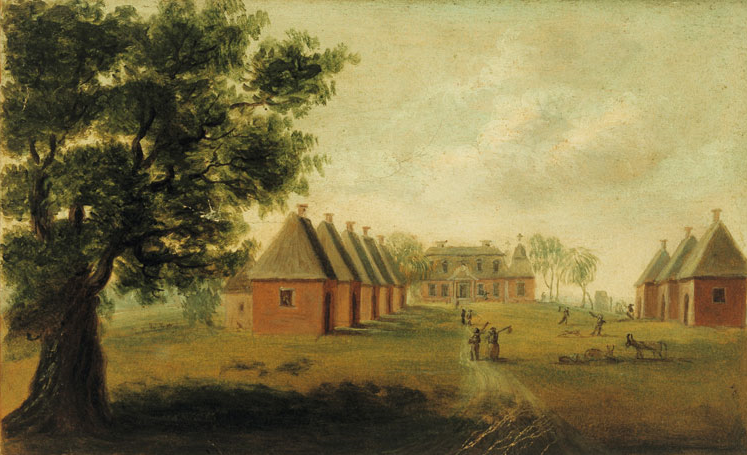
In this vista of the house by British artist Thomas Coram, painted in about 1800, two rows of one-room slave houses dominate the foreground.

Lawrence A. Walker of Summerville, South Carolina, bought the property in 1946 from Clarence E. Chapman of New York, and G. Everett Hoyt of Fairfield, Connecticut paid $175,000 for the house, including 1,027 acres, along with personal property in 1953. A later owner, Charles A. Atkins, was indicted in federal court over bogus tax schemes, and he transferred the house to his wife. Atkins had himself acquired the house from Fannie H. Brawley and William J. Iselin for $2,300,565. The Historic Foundation of Charleston bought the 800-acre plantation in August 1987 to prevent its possible development. The Foundation paid $2,800,000, and resold the property for $2,550,000 in August 1988 to S. Parker Gilbert, a New York City investment banker, and his wife. The Foundation expanded its pre-existing easements on the property to prevent any subdivisions of the property, protect a two-mile entry road, and preserve the interior of the house.

== See also ==
- List of National Historic Landmarks in South Carolina
- National Register of Historic Places listings in Berkeley County, South Carolina
