= Rod Wilson =

American football player and coach (born 1981)

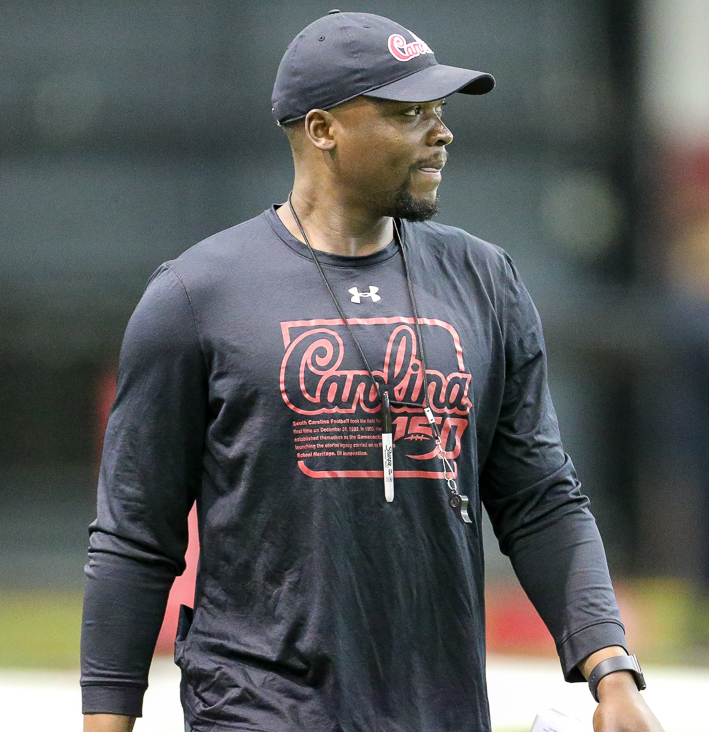
- Wilson in 2020

Arizona Cardinals
- Title: Inside linebackers coach

Personal information
- Born: November 12, 1981 (age 44); Cross, South Carolina, U.S.
- Listed height: 6 ft 2 in (1.88 m)
- Listed weight: 230 lb (104 kg)

Career information
- Position: Defensive back (No. 59, 56, 58)
- High school: Cross
- College: South Carolina
- NFL draft: 2005: 7th round, 220th overall pick

Career history

Playing
- Chicago Bears (2005–2007); Tampa Bay Buccaneers (2008–2009); Jacksonville Jaguars (2010)*; Chicago Bears (2010)
- * Offseason or practice squad member only

Coaching
- Charleston Southern (2013–2016) Inside linebackers coach; Kansas City Chiefs (2017–2019) Assistant special teams coach; South Carolina (2020) Linebackers coach; Coastal Carolina (2021) Inside linebackers coach; Kansas City Chiefs (2022–2023) Defensive assistant; Kansas City Chiefs (2024–2025) Outside linebackers coach; Arizona Cardinals (2026–present) Inside linebackers coach

Awards and highlights
- As player: All-SEC (2004); As coach: 3× Super Bowl champion (LIV, LVII, LVIII)

Career NFL statistics
- Total tackles: 47
- Forced fumbles: 1
- Stats at Pro Football Reference

Rodriques Wilson (born November 12, 1981) is an American professional football coach and former linebacker who is the inside linebackers coach for the Arizona Cardinals of the National Football League (NFL). He previously served as the outside linebackers coach for the Kansas City Chiefs from 2024 to 2025.

Wilson played college football for the South Carolina Gamecocks and was selected by the Chicago Bears in the seventh round of the 2005 NFL draft. He was also a member of the Tampa Bay Buccaneers and Jacksonville Jaguars. Wilson's coaching career began in 2013 and he previously served as an assistant coach for Charleston Southern University, the University of South Carolina, Coastal Carolina University and Kansas City Chiefs.

== Playing career ==
Pre-draft measurables
Height	Weight	40-yard dash	20-yard shuttle	Three-cone drill	Vertical jump	Broad jump	Bench press
6 ft 1 1/2 in (1.87 m)	227 lb (103 kg)	4.67 s	4.12 s	7.10 s	39.0 in (0.99 m)	9 ft 11 in (3.02 m)	21 reps
All values from Pro Day

=== Chicago Bears ===
Wilson broke his arm in a 2008 preseason game against the San Francisco 49ers and was placed on injured reserve, ending his season. He was later released with an injury settlement.

=== Tampa Bay Buccaneers ===
Wilson signed with the Tampa Bay Buccaneers on December 17, 2008.

=== Jacksonville Jaguars ===
Wilson signed with the Jacksonville Jaguars on August 17, 2010. Following the NFL Preseason, he was released on September 3, 2010.

=== Chicago Bears ===
Wilson signed with the Chicago Bears on September 15, 2010, after an injury to linebacker Hunter Hillenmeyer.

== Coaching career ==
=== Charleston Southern ===
Wilson was the inside linebackers coach at Charleston Southern University from 2013 to 2016.

=== Furman ===
On January 18, 2017, Wilson was hired as the linebackers coach at Furman University.

=== Kansas City Chiefs (first stint) ===
On February 7, 2017, Wilson was hired by the Kansas City Chiefs as their assistant special teams coach under head coach Andy Reid after being a coach at Furman for only 20 days. In 2019, Wilson won his first Super Bowl when the Chiefs defeated the San Francisco 49ers 31–20 in Super Bowl LIV.

=== South Carolina ===
On February 21, 2020, Wilson was hired as the linebackers coach for the South Carolina Gamecocks.

Following the conclusion of the 2020 season, it was announced that Wilson would not be retained as a member of new head coach Shane Beamer's staff.

=== Coastal Carolina ===
On June 2, 2021, Wilson was hired as the inside linebackers coach for the Coastal Carolina Chanticleers.

=== Kansas City Chiefs (second stint) ===
In March 2022, Wilson was re-hired by the Chiefs as a defensive assistant. In 2022, Wilson won his second Super Bowl when the Chiefs defeated the Philadelphia Eagles 38–35 in Super Bowl LVII. In 2023, Wilson won his third Super Bowl when the Chiefs defeated the 49ers 25–22 in Super Bowl LVIII.

=== Arizona Cardinals ===
On February 20, 2026, Wilson was hired by the Arizona Cardinals as their inside linebackers coach under head coach Mike LaFleur.
