= Sam Stephenson (writer) =

Sam Stephenson (born 1966 in Chapel Hill, North Carolina) is a writer who grew up in Washington, North Carolina. Since 1997 he has been studying the life and work of photographer W. Eugene Smith, authoring three books of Smith's work including The Jazz Loft Project which was published by Alfred A. Knopf in November 2009. The Jazz Loft Project was accompanied by an exhibition, a public radio series, a website, and a multi-media collaboration with jazz pianist Jason Moran. In September 2010 the Jazz Loft Project won the "Innovative Use of Archives Award" from the Archivists Roundtable of Metropolitan New York. Stephenson's 2001 book, Dream Street: W. Eugene Smith's Pittsburgh Project, was published by W.W. Norton and remains in print in 2010. Stephenson has been associated with the Center for Documentary Studies at Duke University since 1996, either as a consultant or a full-time employee and instructor.

Stephenson is currently working on a biography of Smith for Farrar, Straus and Giroux, the manuscript to be completed by the end of 2011. Future projects he has mentioned concern jazz musicians Sonny Clark, Zoot Sims, and Thelonious Monk, as well as writer Joseph Mitchell, and a national oral history project on primary health care providers (doctors, nurses, midwives) over the age of seventy-five. In the early fall 2010 he's also been talking about initial explorations of a hypothetical independent literary institute based in Durham-Chapel Hill with several fellow writers and partners.
