= Richmond Plantation =

Archaeological site in South Carolina, United States

- U.S. National Register of Historic Places
- U.S. Historic district
- Location within South Carolina Location within the United States
- Location: Southeast of Cordesville, near Cordesville, South Carolina
- Coordinates: 33°04′43″N 79°51′34″W
- Area: 152.4 acres (61.7 ha)
- Built: 1927
- Architect: Clinton & Russell; Shaw, Richard Norman
- Architectural style: Shavian Manorial Style
- NRHP reference No.: 80003653
- Added to NRHP: November 24, 1980

Richmond Plantation, also known as Girl Scout Plantation, is a national historic district located near Cordesville, Berkeley County, South Carolina. It was built about 1927, and includes a manor house and outbuildings constructed as a hunting lodge for George A. Ellis, a prominent New York financier and co-founder of E. F. Hutton & Co.

The manor house is a 1 1/2-story, asymmetrical brick building with a rectangular central mass, and two single story wings—an American interpretation of the Shavian Manor Style, defined by the neo-medieval work of the English architect Richard Norman Shaw. Also on the property are four outbuildings in the Shavian Manor Style: a carriage house, dog house, guest house, and gate house. Additional features of the property include a one-story log house, three one-story frame cabins, a cemetery, and archaeological remains of the original 18th and 19th century rice plantation. In 1963 the property was sold to the Low Country Girl Scout Council, who maintained it as a camp until 2011. The property was sold, via absolute auction, to a private buyer in 2013 but remains under the terms of a conservation easement.

It was listed in the National Register of Historic Places in 1980.
