= Taveau Church =

Historic church in South Carolina, United States

- U.S. National Register of Historic Places
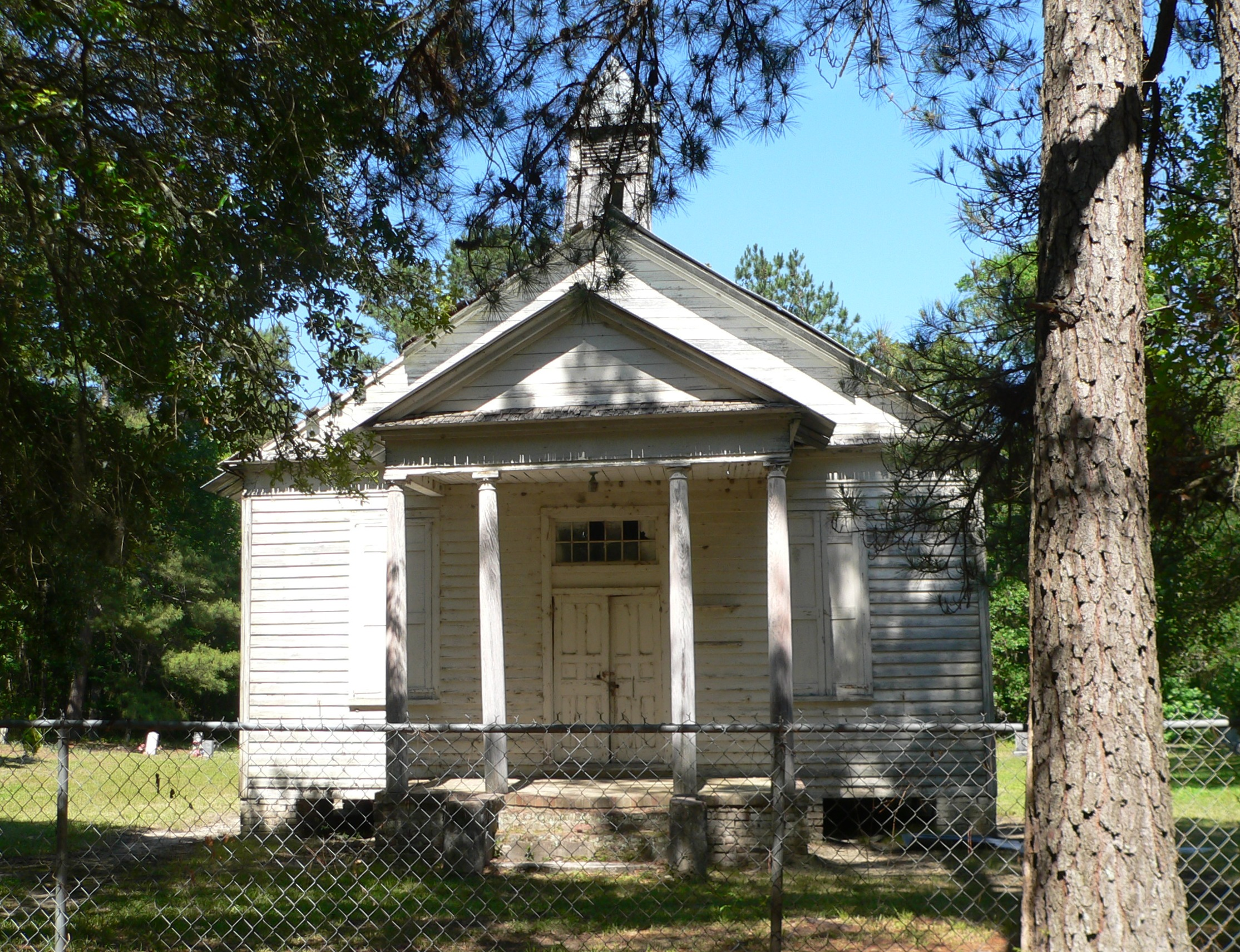
- Taveau Church from the front

- Location within South Carolina Location within the United States
- Location: South of Cordesville on South Carolina Highway 44, near Cordesville, South Carolina
- Coordinates: 33°6′21″N 79°56′23″W
- Area: 0.5 acres (0.20 ha)
- Architectural style: Classical Revival
- NRHP reference No.: 78002493
- Added to NRHP: February 14, 1978

Taveau Church, also known as Tavou Church, is a historic church located near Cordesville, Berkeley County, South Carolina. It was built about 1835, and is a small clapboard Classical Revival structure on a low brick pier foundation. It has a gable roof with a wooden bell tower. The front façade features a small pedimented portico supported by four slender wooden Doric columns.

It was added to the National Register in 1978.
