= Deleitosa =

Deleitosa, Spain
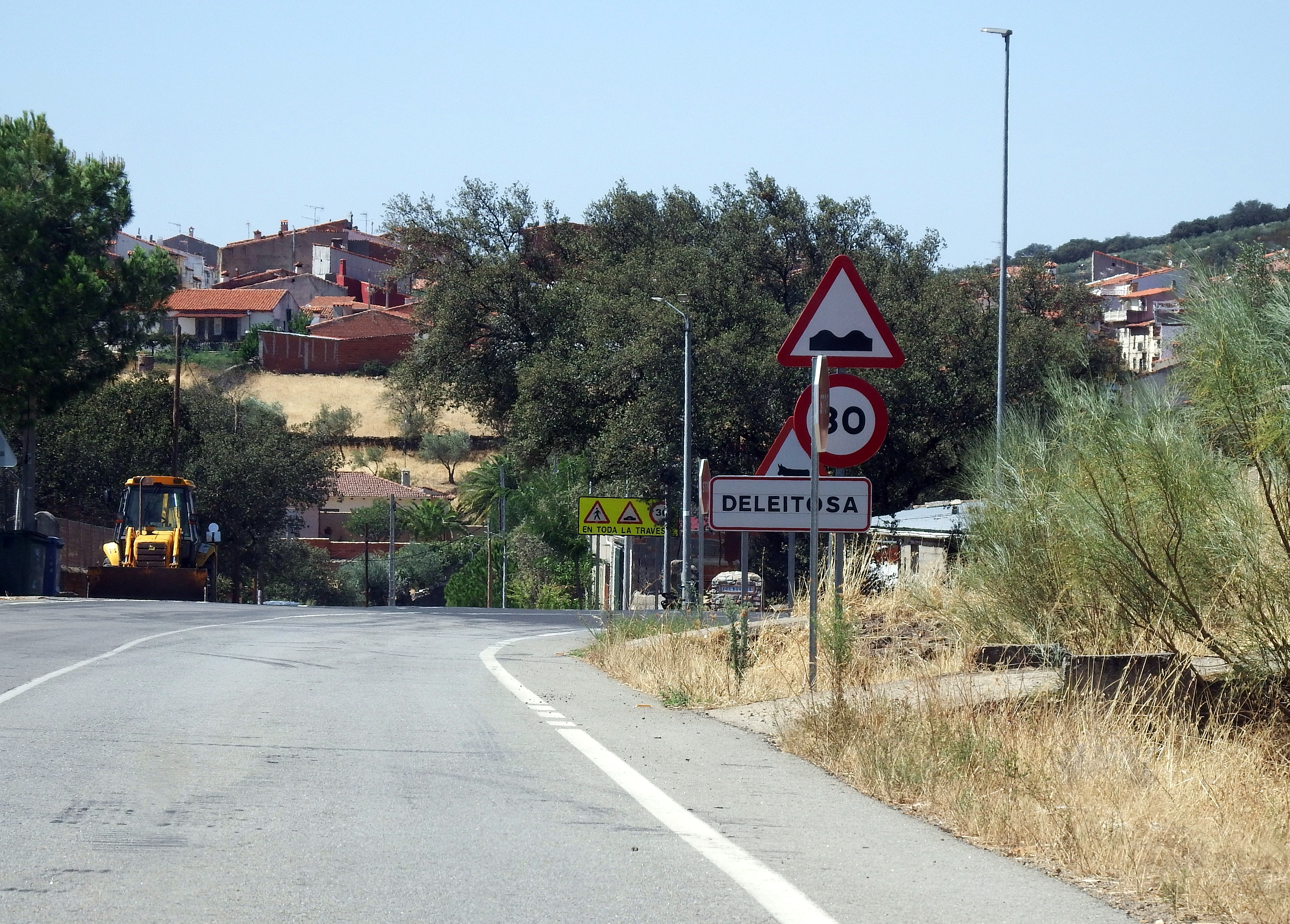
- Deleitosa Entrance

- Flag Coat of arms
- Interactive map of Deleitosa, Spain
- Coordinates: 39°41′N 5°19′W
- Country: Spain
- Autonomous community: Extremadura
- Province: Cáceres
- Municipality: Deleitosa

Area
  - Total: 144 km^{2} (56 sq mi)
- Elevation: 564 m (1,850 ft)

Population (2025-01-01)
  - Total: 681
  - Density: 4.73/km^{2} (12.2/sq mi)
- Time zone: UTC+1 (CET)
  - Summer (DST): UTC+2 (CEST)

Deleitosa is a municipality located in the province of Cáceres, Extremadura, Spain. As of 2023, according to the National Institute of Statistics, the municipality had a population of 685 inhabitants. In 1950, during the Francoist era, W. Eugene Smith visited Deleitosa to show the poverty of Spain in photographs.

== See also ==
- List of municipalities in Cáceres
