= Cross, South Carolina =

- Unincorporated community
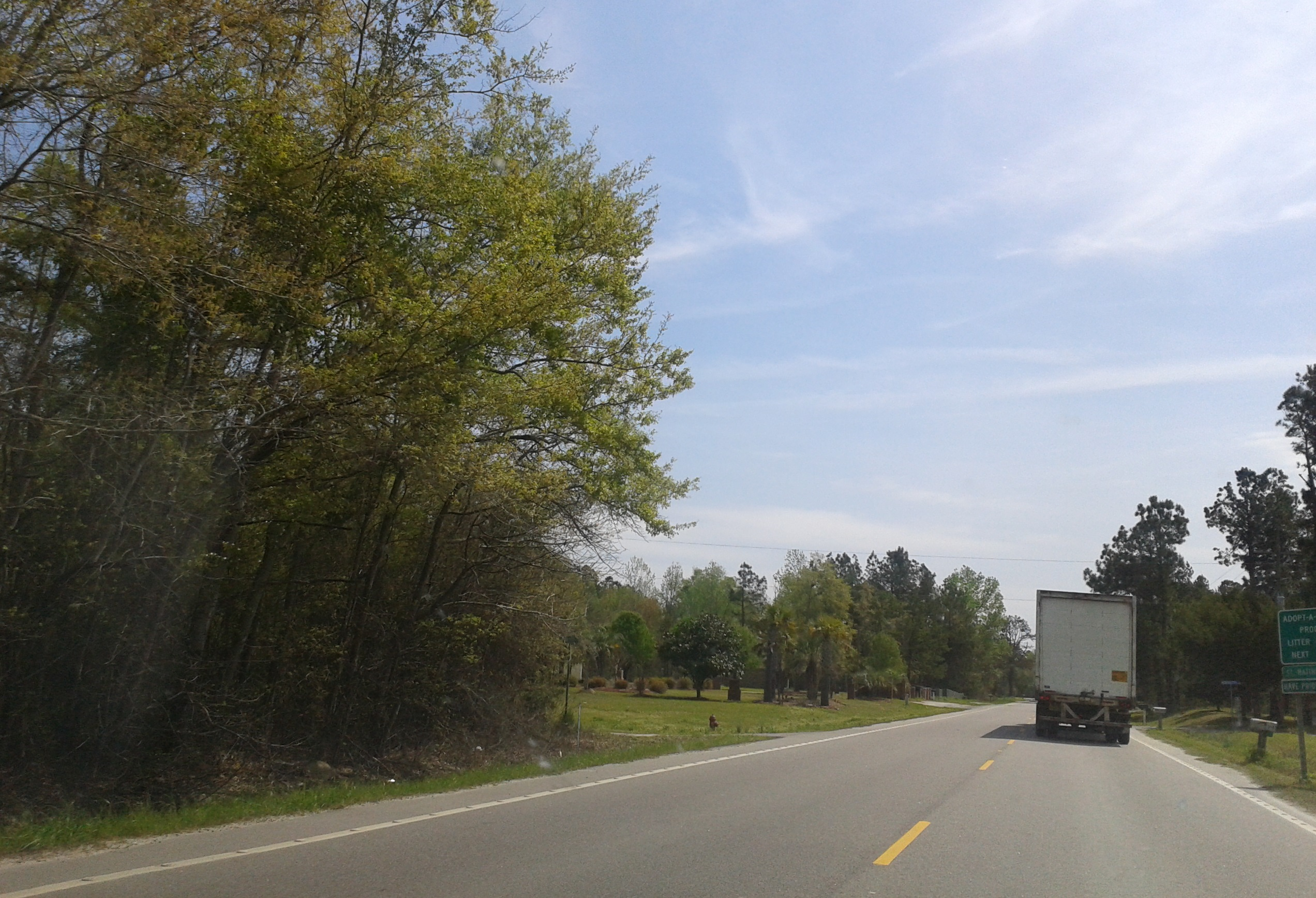
- Outskirts of Cross in April, 2015
- Nickname: home of the mighty Trojans
- Location within South Carolina Location within the United States
- Coordinates: 33°19′39″N 80°08′54″W
- Country: United States
- State: South Carolina
- County: Berkeley
- Elevation: 79 ft (24 m)
- Time zone: UTC-5 (Eastern (EST))
  - Summer (DST): UTC-4 (EDT)
- ZIP code: 29436
- Area codes: 843, 854
- GNIS feature ID: 1221844

Cross is an unincorporated community located in rural northwestern Berkeley County, South Carolina, United States. It is centered at the junctions of South Carolina Highway 6 and South Carolina Highway 45. The zip code for Cross is 29436.

The Lawson's Pond Plantation and Loch Dhu are listed on the National Register of Historic Places.

== Notable people ==
- Rod Wilson, former NFL linebacker
