= Robert L. Helmly =

American politician (born 1927)

Member of the South Carolina Senate from the 37th district
- In office 1989–1993
- Preceded by: Rembert Dennis
- Succeeded by: Bill Mescher

Member of the South Carolina House of Representatives from the 100th district
- In office 1975–1989
- Preceded by: District created
- Succeeded by: John Bacot Williams

Member of the South Carolina House of Representatives from the Berkeley County district
- In office 1973–1975 Serving with Thomas Aimar Knight, E. Jarvis Morris
- Preceded by: District created
- Succeeded by: District abolished

Personal details
- Born: June 8, 1927 (age 99) Savannah, Georgia, United States
- Party: Democratic

Robert Linwood Helmly (born June 8, 1927) is an American former politician. He served in the South Carolina House of Representatives and South Carolina Senate for Berkeley County, South Carolina as a Democrat. He was born in Savannah, Georgia and was the president of a telephone company. He resides in Moncks Corner, South Carolina.

South Carolina House of Representatives
Preceded by District created	Member of the South Carolina House of Representatives from the Berkeley County district 1973–1975; Served alongside: Thomas Aimar Knight, E. Jarvis Morris	Succeeded by District abolished
Preceded by District created	Member of the South Carolina House of Representatives from the 100th district 1975–1989	Succeeded by John Bacot Williams
South Carolina Senate
Preceded by Rembert Dennis	Member of the South Carolina Senate from the 37th district 1989–1993	Succeeded by Bill Mescher
