= Gertrude Sanford Legendre =

American socialite, hunter, and spy (1902–2000)

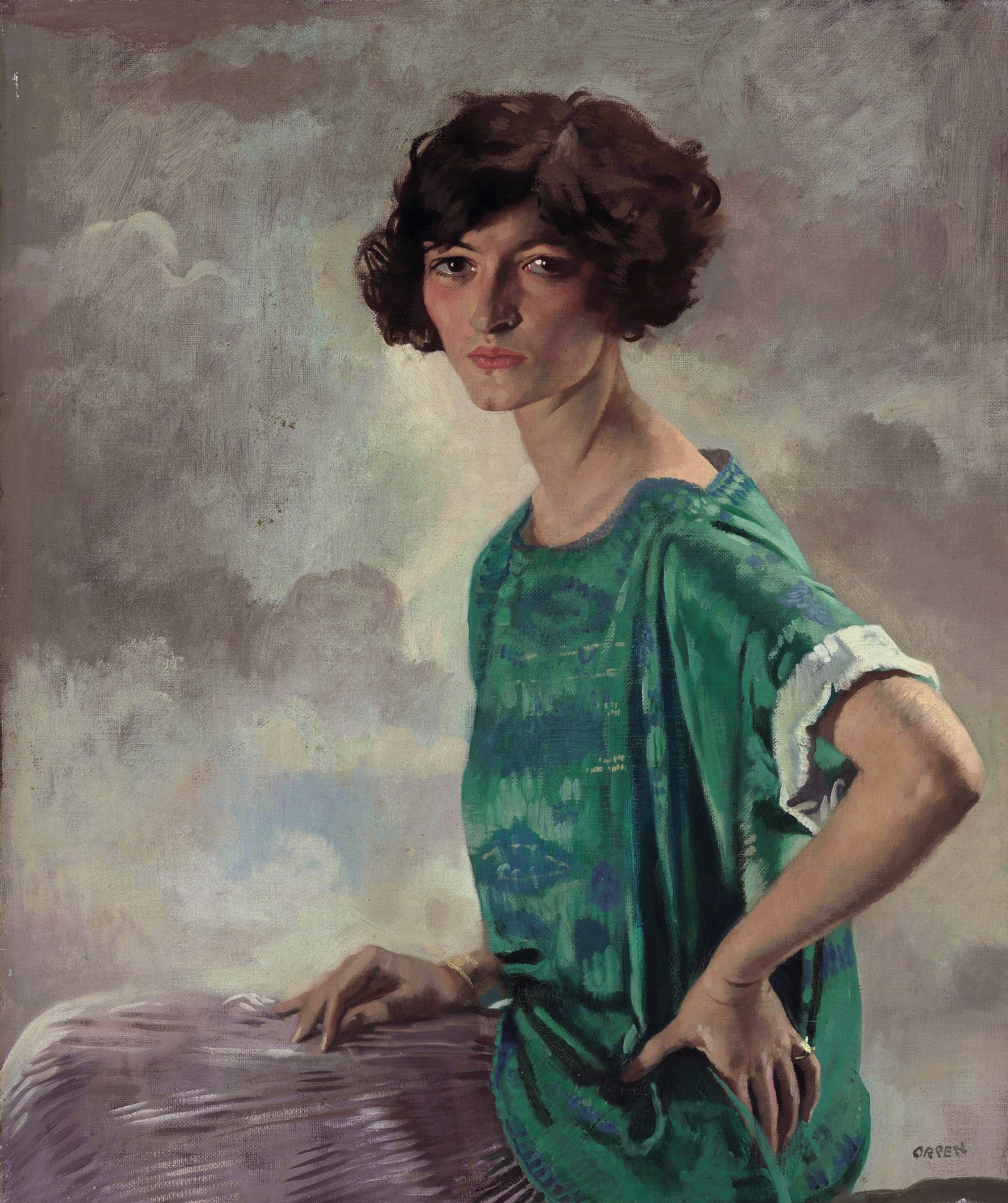
- Gertrude Sanford (by William Orpen, 1922)
- Born: Gertrude Ellen Sanford; 29 March 1902; Aiken, South Carolina, US
- Died: 8 March 2000 (aged 97); Berkeley County, South Carolina, US
- Resting place: Medway, South Carolina, US
- Known for: Hunter, spy, socialite
- Spouse(s): Sidney J. Legendre (1929–1948)
- Children: 2

Gertrude Sanford Legendre (March 29, 1902 – March 8, 2000) was an American socialite who served with the Office of Strategic Services, the American spy agency, during World War II. She was also an explorer, big-game hunter, environmentalist, and owner of Medway plantation in South Carolina.

== Early life ==
Born in Aiken, South Carolina, she was the daughter of New York rug magnate and member of the United States House of Representatives from New York's 20th congressional district, John Sanford (1851), and Ethel Sanford. Her paternal grandparents were Sarah Jane Cochran Sanford (1830–1901) and Stephen Sanford (1826–1913), an American businessman and president of Sanford and Sons Carpet Company, who also served as a member of the United States House of Representatives from New York's 18th congressional district. Her maternal grandparents were Gertrude Ellen Dupuy Sanford and Henry Shelton Sanford, a diplomat appointed by Abraham Lincoln and the founder of Sanford, Florida. Her parents were second cousins; their grandfathers were brothers.

Gertrude was the youngest of three children, and she, her brother Stephen Sanford – an internationally recognized polo player known as Laddie – and her sister Sarah Jane Sanford were said to have been the inspiration for Philip Barry's 1928 play Holiday. The play was made into a 1930 film, starring Ann Harding, Mary Astor, and Robert Ames, and a 1938 film, starring Katharine Hepburn and Cary Grant.

Gertrude, who always went by the nickname Gertie, was reared in Amsterdam, New York and in a Manhattan townhouse on East 72nd Street, half a block from Central Park. She was educated at Foxcroft School in Middleburg, Virginia and made her society debut after graduating in 1920.

She was engaged to the actor Harry Fender in 1927.

== Big-game hunting ==
While still in her teens, Gertrude embarked on her first hunting trip to the Grand Tetons of Wyoming. For years, she pursued big game and contributed rare specimens to natural history museums, covering the period of 1923 to 1939, including expeditions to Africa, Iran, Southeast Asia, Canada, and Alaska. She was the only woman on the expeditions and was noted for her energy, good sportsmanship and determination.

During her exploration of Abyssinia (more commonly called Ethiopia) for the American Museum of Natural History as part of the Sanford-Legendre Abyssinia Expedition in 1928–29, she fell in love with the expedition's co-leader Sidney J. Legendre of New Orleans.

== Marriage and family ==
Gertrude Sanford married the expedition's co-leader Sidney J. Legendre on 17 September 1929 in New York. Following their marriage, the couple purchased one of South Carolina's oldest surviving plantations, Medway, to make their home. Medway was in derelict condition, and they restored the home and the grounds over many years. It eventually became a successful timber operation.

The couple had two daughters, Landine Legendre Wood Manigault, born 1933; and Bokara Legendre, born 1940. Landine's first husband was Peter Hodgson Wood of Cross River, New York. With him she had two children: Peter Sanford Harrison Wood, born 1954; and Wendeney LeGendre Wood, born 1955. Her second husband was Peter Manigault (1927–2004), chairman of The Evening Post Publishing Company in Charleston, South Carolina. They had two children: Gabrielle Hamilton Manigault, born 1960, and Pierre Manigault, born 1962. Both marriages ended in divorce. Bokara was married twice: to Richard Mack, a film maker, and Arthur Patterson, a venture capitalist. Both of her marriages ended in divorce also.

== World War II/OSS ==
When World War II began, both Sidney and Gertrude Legendre served their country. Sidney joined the U.S. Navy and was stationed in Hawaii. Gertrude worked in Washington and later London for the Office of Strategic Services (OSS). She was not a spy, but a clerk managing the cable desk. In London, she served under David K.E. Bruce and often entertained the top brass at her townhouse, despite the danger of German buzz-bombs. In September 1944, the agency transferred her to Paris, giving her a WAC uniform and paperwork identifying her as a second lieutenant.

In late September 1944 she became the first American woman in uniform captured in Germany when, on an unauthorized visit to the front near Luxembourg, she found herself pinned down by German sniper fire, along with two OSS officers and their driver. Held as a prisoner of war for six months, she narrowly escaped on a train to Switzerland. As the train stopped just short of the border she dashed from the train while a German guard shouted orders for her to halt or be shot. She continued and secured her freedom.

After the war, Mrs. Legendre helped a German SS officer who had been kind to her emigrate to the United States and assisted others who had helped her during her imprisonment by sending them food and other necessities. She also established the Medway Plan to pair American cities and individuals with cities and individuals in Europe devastated by the war.

== Later life and legacy ==
In 1947, Gertrude and her husband Sidney joined an expedition to India led by S. Dillon Ripley to collect specimens for the Peabody Museum of Natural History at Yale. Sidney died at Medway of a sudden heart attack on 8 March 1948. Gertrude joined another Ripley expedition to Nepal in 1949. She married Dr. Carnes "Piggy" Weeks on 22 March 1951, but the marriage was an unhappy one that ended in divorce after five years, and she reverted to her Legendre name. Gertrude traveled on a final collecting expedition in 1952 organized by the American Museum of Natural History, traveling to Africa. During that trip she visited the medical mission of Dr. Albert Schweitzer, who she described as one of the greatest men she ever met. She never lost her hunger for travel, visiting many countries and making a round-the-world trip with her daughter Bokara Legendre in 1962.

In her later years, Gertrude established the Medway Environmental Trust for educational purposes and to ensure that her beloved home, Medway, would forever be managed as a nature preserve. In the 1980s and 1990s, she granted conservation easements on her landmark house to the Historic Charleston Foundation and on most of the property to Ducks Unlimited.

Until nearly the end of her life, Mrs. Legendre gave a traditional New Year's Eve costume party at Medway. At one of the last of those parties, she offered a toast: "I look ahead. I always have. I don't contemplate life. I live it, and I'm having the time of my life."

She wrote two memoirs, The Sands Ceased to Run (1947) and The Time of My Life (1987). She is the subject of the book Gertie: The Fabulous Life of Gertrude Sanford Legendre, Heiress, Explorer, Socialite, Spy (2019) and A Guest of the Reich (2019). She died at the age of 97, at Medway, on March 8, 2000. It was the same day and month of Sidney's death. Her ashes were buried beside his grave in the plantation cemetery.
