= Pinopolis Historic District South =

Historic district in South Carolina, United States

- U.S. National Register of Historic Places
- U.S. Historic district
- Location within South Carolina Location within the United States
- Location: CR 5, Pinopolis, South Carolina
- Coordinates: 33°13′52″N 80°02′04″W
- Area: 16 acres (6.5 ha)
- Architectural style: Queen Anne, Gothic Revival
- MPS: Pinopolis MRA
- NRHP reference No.: 82003835
- Added to NRHP: August 19, 1982

Pinopolis Historic District South is a national historic district located at Pinopolis, Berkeley County, South Carolina. It encompasses 12 contributing buildings and consists of the historic core of the planters retreat community of Pinopolis. The district contains numerous early to middle-19th century summer houses, the Gothic Revival influenced Pinopolis Methodist Church (c. 1900), and other later 19th century buildings including some in the Queen Anne style. The buildings of the Pinopolis Historic District South are representative of the development of vernacular building forms and construction technology of the 19th century. The absence of stylistic pretensions in most of the buildings is typical of pineland village architecture.

It was listed in the National Register of Historic Places in 1982.
