= Lewisfield Plantation =

Historic house in South Carolina, United States

- U.S. National Register of Historic Places
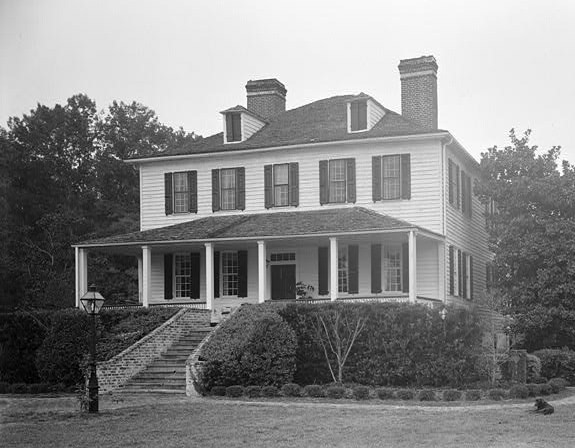
- Lewisfield, HABS Photo, 1978

- Location within South Carolina Location within the United States
- Location: About 2.5 miles south of Moncks Corner on U.S. Route 52, near Moncks Corner, South Carolina
- Coordinates: 33°9′36″N 79°59′37″W
- Area: 5 acres (2.0 ha)
- Built: c. 1774
- NRHP reference No.: 73001678
- Added to NRHP: May 9, 1973

Lewisfield Plantation is a historic plantation house located near Moncks Corner, Berkeley County, South Carolina. It was built about 1774, and is a 2 1/2-half story clapboard dwelling. It is supported by a high brick foundation that encloses a raised basement. It has a five bay wide verandah supported by six slender Doric order columns. Records show over 100 slaves were held in bondage on the plantation as of 1835.

Lewisfield fronts on the Cooper River and was bounded by Exeter Plantation to the north and Mulberry Plantation to the south. Sedgewick Lewis bought the 1000 acre plantation in 1767 from Baronet John Colleton. At that time, the plantation was known as Little Landing, but it was later known as Lewisfield because of Lewis' ownership. Lord Cornwallis was a guest of Lewis when Cornwallis was heading to Charleston from Camden.

A Revolutionary War skirmish occurred directly in front of the house when Colonel Wade Hampton (1752–1835) surprised a British force that had stopped at Lewisfield Plantation to await a paroled prisoner of war, Keating Simons, who was the owner of the plantation at the time.

In 1937, Robert R.M. Carpenter bought the estate for $50,000 from the Lewisfield Club, a collection of owners. Carpenter intended to use the house as a duck hunting property in the winters. In 1948, Carpenter sold the plantation (by then increased to 2500 acres) to the Williams Furniture Corporation of Sumter, South Carolina. The business bought the house not for the historic plantation house but rather to secure several million board feet of lumber growing on about 1500 acres of the estate; the business did not have immediate plans for the portion of the estate with the house and hunting grounds.

South Carolinian politician Rembert Dennis lived on the plantation. It was listed in the National Register of Historic Places in 1973. Under new ownership, the house and grounds are undergoing a massive renovation and restoration to save both house and grounds.
