= Keller House =

Keller House may refer to:

in the United States

(by state then city)

- Keller House and Derick, Paris, Idaho, listed on the National Register of Historic Places (NRHP) in Bear Lake County
- Edward H. and Bertha R. Keller House, Portland, Oregon, listed on the NRHP in Multnomah County
- Jacob Keller Farm, Ephrata, Pennsylvania, listed on the NRHP in Lancaster County
- Keller House (Hazleton, Pennsylvania), formerly listed on the NRHP in Luzerne County
- Keller-Grunder House, Cuero, Texas, listed on the NRHP in DeWitt County
- Keller House (Houston, Texas), listed on the NRHP in Harris County
- Stoner-Keller House and Mill, Strasburg, Virginia, listed on the NRHP in Shenandoah County
- Keller House (Colville, Washington), listed on the NRHP in Stevens County

== See also ==
- Keller Site (disambiguation)
