= Pineville Historic District =

Historic district in South Carolina, United States

- U.S. National Register of Historic Places
- U.S. Historic district
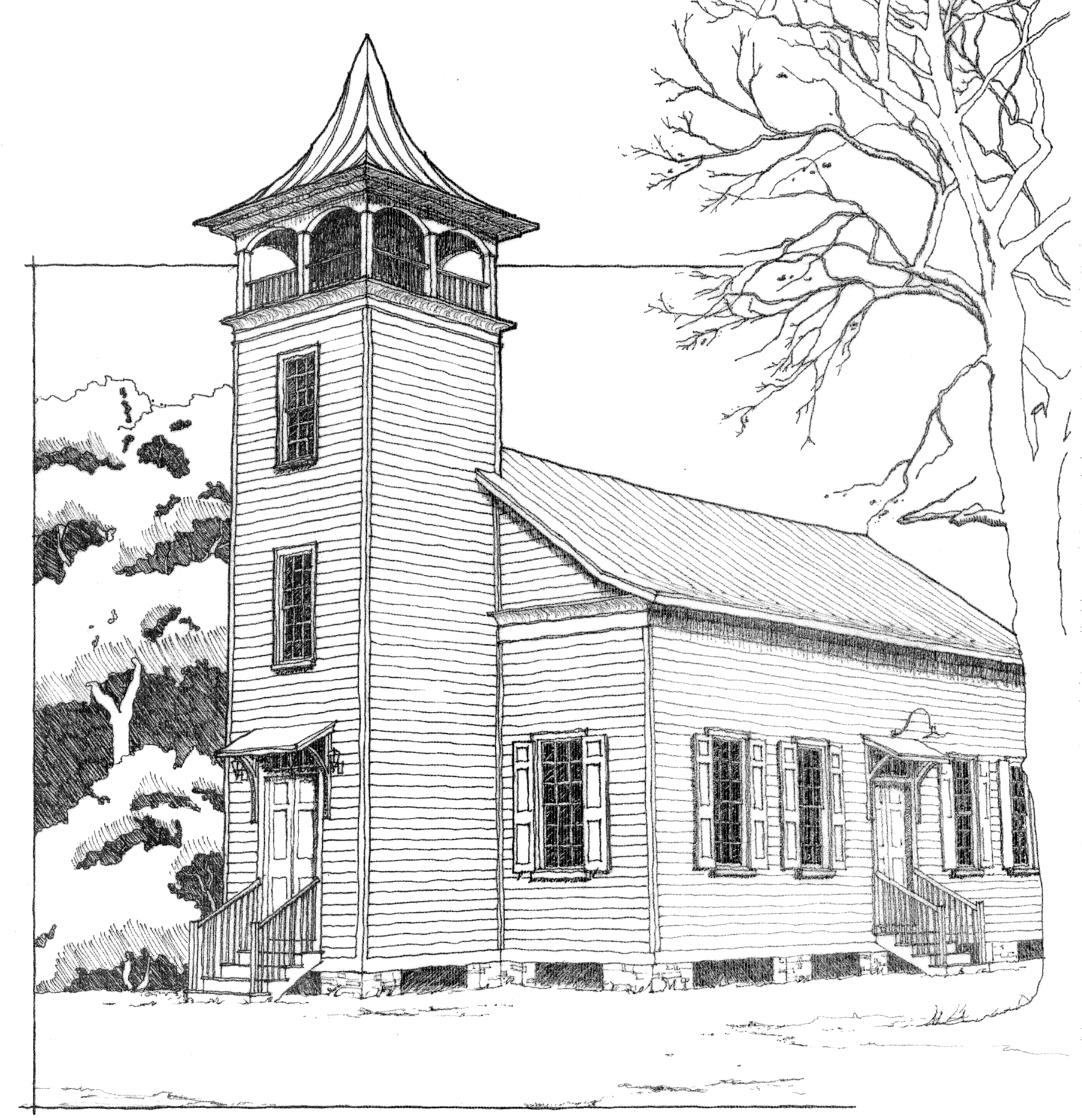
- Pineville Chapel, in the district. From a 2012 Historic American Buildings Survey drawing.

- Location within South Carolina Location within the United States
- Location: Rd. S-8-204 S of jct. with SC 45, Pineville, South Carolina
- Coordinates: 33°13′52″N 80°02′04″W
- Area: 15.2 acres (6.2 ha)
- Built: 1820
- Architectural style: Bungalow/craftsman, Greek Revival, Federal
- NRHP reference No.: 92000024
- Added to NRHP: February 10, 1992

Pineville Historic District is a national historic district located at Pineville, Berkeley County, South Carolina. It encompasses seven contributing buildings and illustrates Pineville's original role as a 19th-century pineland village, and its gradual transformation to agricultural land and to a year-round community in the late-19th and early-20th centuries. The Pineville Historic District consists of four principal buildings, three residential buildings and one Episcopal church, ranging in date from about 1810 through 1925. The architectural styles represented include Federal, Greek Revival, and Bungalow. In the mid to late-19th century, Pineville was a densely settled village that included as many as one hundred buildings, including an academy, racetrack, library, churches, and residences. Much of the town was burned by Union troops at the close of the American Civil War in April 1865. In the years following the war, much of the land that made up the village was converted for use as farmland. Since that time, Pineville has remained a small community of less than 20 structures surrounded by open farm and hunting lands.

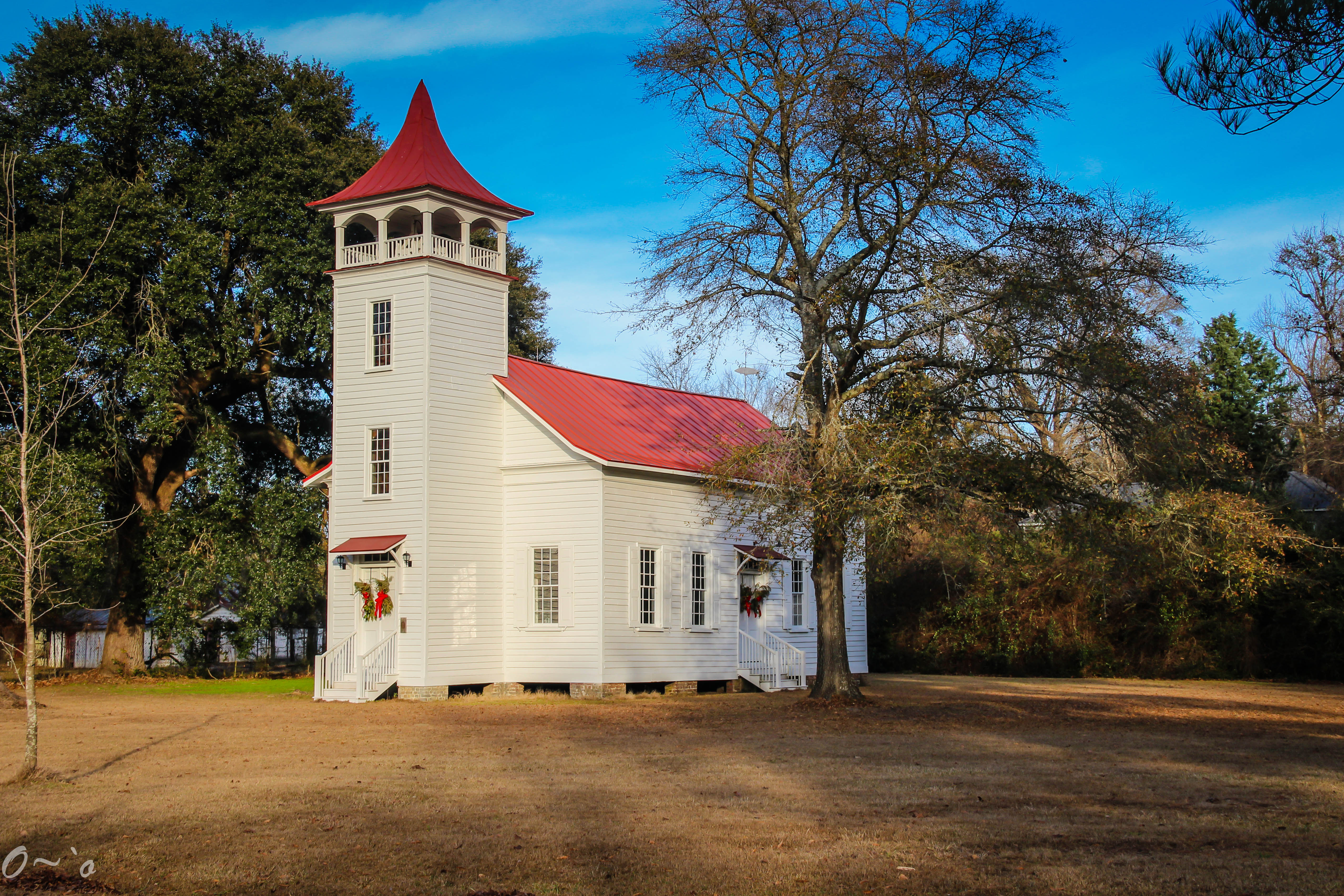
Pineville Chapel

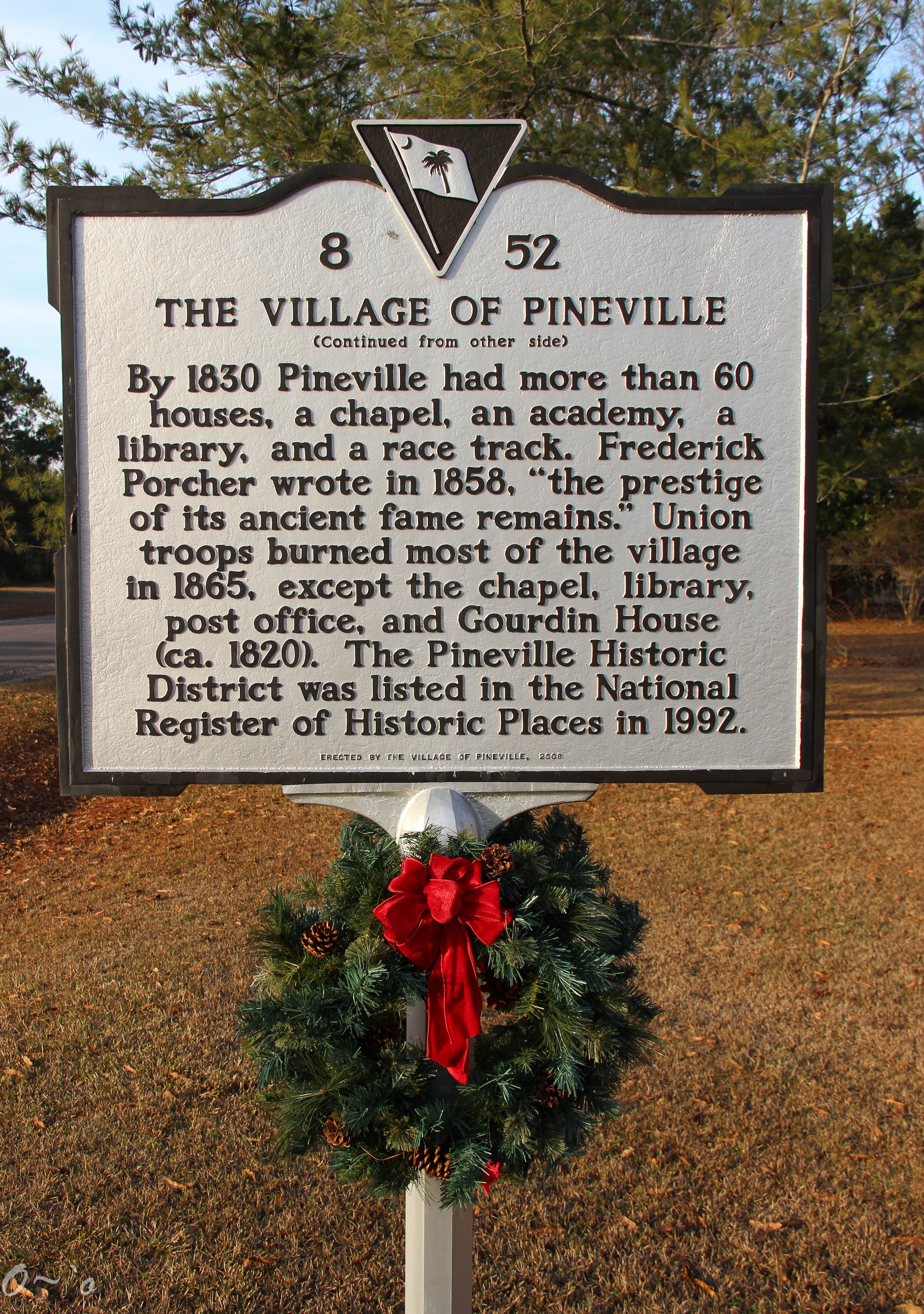
Pineville Chapel

It was listed in the National Register of Historic Places in 1992.
