= Lawson's Pond Plantation =

Historic house in South Carolina, United States

- U.S. National Register of Historic Places
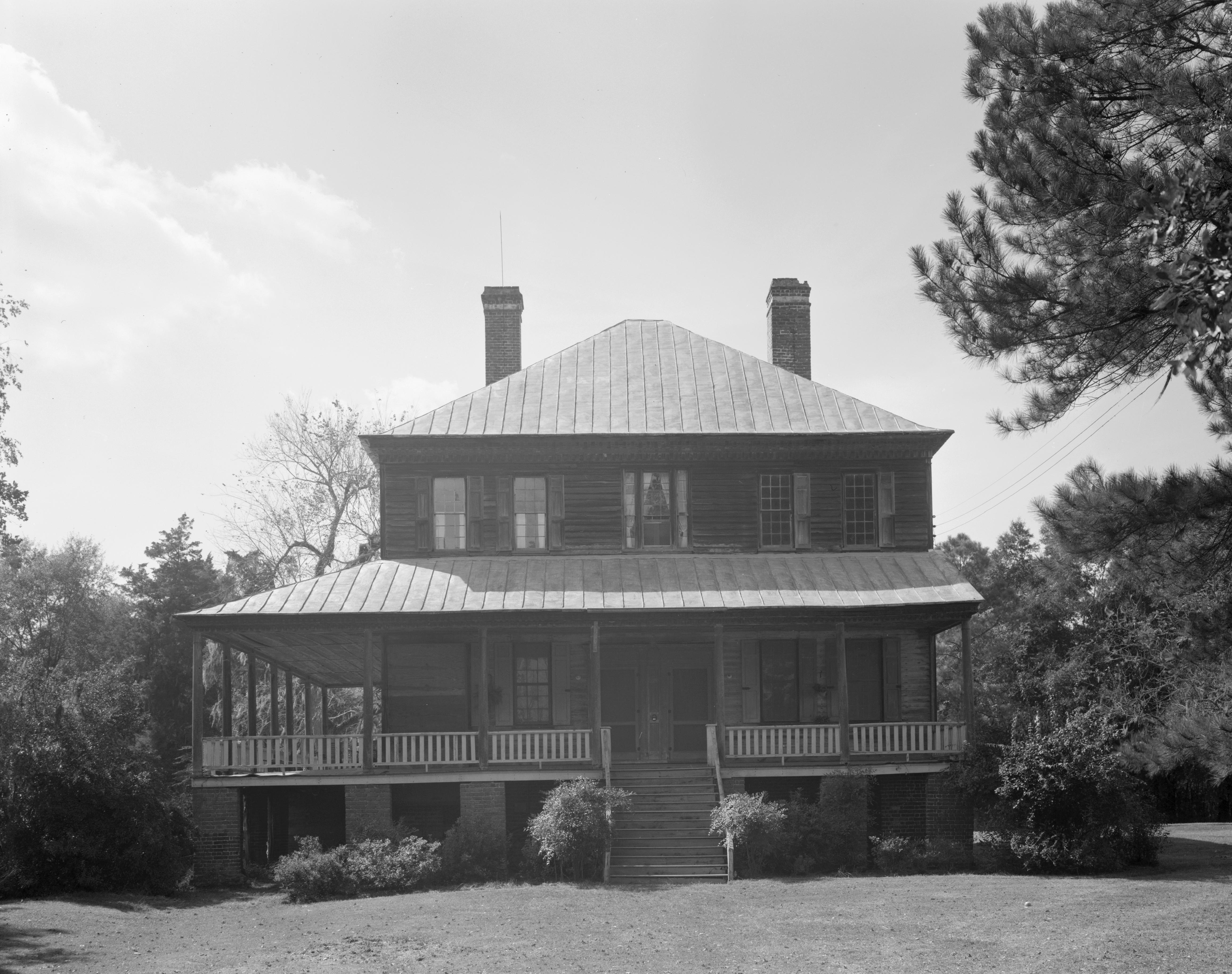
- Lawson's Pond Plantation House, HABS Photo, October 1978

- Location within South Carolina Location within the United States
- Location: 5 miles north of Cross off South Carolina Highway 6, near Cross, South Carolina
- Coordinates: 33°22′13″N 80°13′22″W
- Area: 9 acres (3.6 ha)
- Built: 1823
- NRHP reference No.: 77001213
- Added to NRHP: December 13, 1977

Lawson's Pond Plantation is a historic plantation house located near Cross, Berkeley County, South Carolina. It was built about 1823, and is a large two-story clapboard structure set upon high foundations. It has a hipped roof and features a one-story piazza along the front and left facades.

It was listed in the National Register of Historic Places in 1977.
