= Keller (given name) =

Keller is a masculine given name borne by:

- Keller Chryst (born 1995), American football quarterback
- Keller E. Rockey (1888–1970), United States Marine Corps lieutenant general
- Keller Williams, American singer, songwriter and jam-band musician
