= Pinopolis Historic District North =

Historic district in South Carolina, United States

- U.S. National Register of Historic Places
- U.S. Historic district
- Location within South Carolina Location within the United States
- Location: Lake View St. South to Lake Moultrie, Pinopolis, South Carolina
- Coordinates: 33°13′52″N 80°02′04″W
- Area: 16 acres (6.5 ha)
- Built by: Cain, William
- Architectural style: Queen Anne
- MPS: Pinopolis MRA
- NRHP reference No.: 82003834
- Added to NRHP: August 19, 1982

Pinopolis Historic District North is a national historic district located at Pinopolis, Berkeley County, South Carolina. It encompasses six contributing buildings on four of the 19th century retreats that helped to engender Pinopolis. The vernacular houses are uniformly of frame construction and abstain from the stylistic pretensions of the permanent planters' seats of the period in accord with their status as houses of retreat. The buildings in the district date from about 1834 to about 1883 and retain in large measure their original forms and features. The district's landscape is unified by the absence of contemporary buildings, heavy foliage, the absence of paved roads, and the cohesiveness of the four residences which are weatherboarded with large porches, reflecting the Queen Anne style.

It was listed in the National Register of Historic Places in 1982.
