= Mount Holly, South Carolina =

Unincorporated community in South Carolina, US

Coordinates: 33°02′04″N 80°02′04″W

Mount Holly is an unincorporated community in Berkeley County, South Carolina, just north of Goose Creek, South Carolina.

== History ==
A post office called Mount Holly was established in 1853, and remained in operation until it was discontinued in 1990. Mount Holly was originally the name of a nearby plantation.

The historic Medway Plantation (c. 1694) is located within the village and is possibly the oldest house in South Carolina. In the 19th century, the Mount Holly Mining and Manufacturing Company was active in the village.
