= William Robertson House =

Historic house in South Carolina, United States

- U.S. National Register of Historic Places
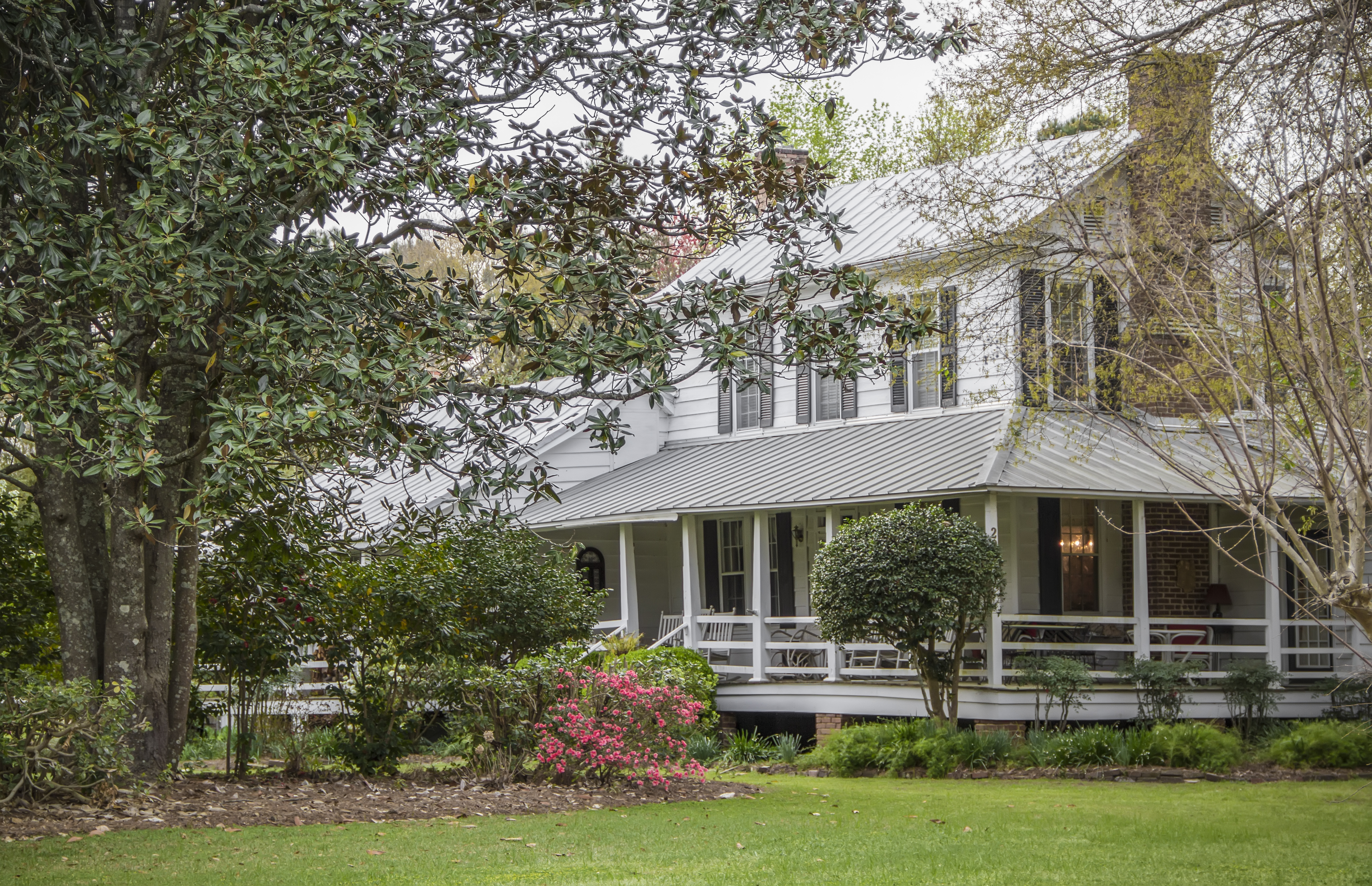

- Location within South Carolina Location within the United States
- Location: CR 5, Pinopolis, South Carolina
- Coordinates: 33°13′52″N 80°2′14″W
- Area: less than one acre
- Built: c. 1844
- MPS: Pinopolis MRA
- NRHP reference No.: 82003836
- Added to NRHP: August 19, 1982

William Robertson House, also known as Wampee Plantation Summer House, is a historic home located at Pinopolis, Berkeley County, South Carolina. It was built about 1844, and is a two-story, three-bay, frame I-House, sheathed in weatherboard. It features a hip roofed, one-story porch spanning the façade and wrapping around the right elevation. The house was one of the early planters' retreats in the pineland village of Pinopolis.

It was listed in the National Register of Historic Places in 1982.
