= South Carolina Highway 402 =

State highway in South Carolina, United States

South Carolina Highway 402

Route information
- Maintained by SCDOT
- Length: 15.680 mi (25.235 km)
- Existed: 1952–present

Major junctions
- West end: To US 52 / US 17 Alt. near Moncks Corner
- East end: SC 41 in Huger

Location
- Country: United States
- State: South Carolina
- Counties: Berkeley

Highway system
- South Carolina State Highway System; Interstate; US; State; Scenic
| ← US 401 | → SC 403 |

South Carolina Highway 402 (SC 402) is a 15.680-mile (25.235 km) primary state highway in the U.S. state of South Carolina. It serves to connect the community of Cordesville with the surrounding highways.

== Route description ==
SC 402 is a two-lane rural road that begins at U.S. Route 52 (US 52) and U.S. Route 17 Alternate (US 17 Alt.) near Moncks Corner; per the South Carolina Department of Transportation, SC 402 ends at the pair of U.S. Highways though signage on US 52/US 17 Alt direct travelers "to" SC 402. From there, it goes east, through Cordesville and by the Huger Recreational Area. At Huger, it ends at SC 41. Because it traverses mostly in or along Francis Marion National Forest, majority of the route is forested.

== History ==
Originally established in 1928, it traversed from US 17 near Moncks Corner to SC 40 near Whitehall Terrace. In 1939, SC 402's eastern terminus was truncated at Huger; its former routing to Whitehall Terrace replaced partly by SC 511 and the remainder becoming secondary roads: United Drive (S-8-598) and Guerins Bridge Road (S-10-98). In 1948, what remained of SC 402 was downgraded to a secondary road. In 1951 or 1952, it was re-established along the same routing now from US 52/US 17 Alt. split near Moncks Corner to SC 41 in Huger. In the late 1980s, SC 402 was removed from the US 52/US 17 Alt split; truncated 0.3 miles (0.48 km) south from the split to a connector road to US 52/US 17 Alt. It was officially extended to the pair of highways at an unknown date.

== Major intersections ==
The entire route is in Berkeley County.

| Location | mi | km | Destinations | Notes |
|---|---|---|---|---|
| | 0.000 | 0.000 | US 17 Alt. / US 52 – Moncks Corner | Official western terminus of SC 402 on an unnamed connector road from US 17 Alt./US 52 to SC 402; western terminus of the connector road |
| | 0.250 | 0.402 | Unnamed connector road west / Turnaround Court north to US 17 Alt. / US 52 | Signed western terminus of SC 402; eastern terminus of unnamed connector route from US 17 Alt./US 52 to SC 402; southern terminus of Turnaround Court |
| Huger | 15.680 | 25.235 | SC 41 – Charleston, Andrews, Georgetown | |
1.000 mi = 1.609 km; 1.000 km = 0.621 mi
