= Keller Lake =

Lake in the Northwest Territories, Canada

- Location within Northwest Territories
- Location: Northwest Territories
- Coordinates: 63.927°N 121.559°W
- Primary outflows: Johnny Hoe River
- Basin countries: Canada
- Max. length: 26 kilometers (16 mi) (N-S)
- Max. width: 25 kilometers (16 mi) (E-W)
- Surface area: 380 square kilometers (150 sq mi)
- Surface elevation: 255 meters (837 ft)

Keller Lake is a surface water body in the Northwest Territories of Canada. It is located 85 kilometers (53 mi) south of the Great Bear Lake and 220 kilometers (140 mi) north of Fort Simpson, at an elevation of 255 meters (837 ft). The lake has a triangular shape, a surface area of 380 square kilometers (150 sq mi), and it empties through the Johnny Hoe River into the Great Bear Lake.

There is a salmonid population in Keller Lake. On some of the plains surrounding Keller Lake, climax polygonal bogs have formed, the early successional stage to which often consists of pioneer Black Spruce.

== See also ==
- List of rivers of the Northwest Territories
