= Pinopolis, South Carolina =

- Census-designated place
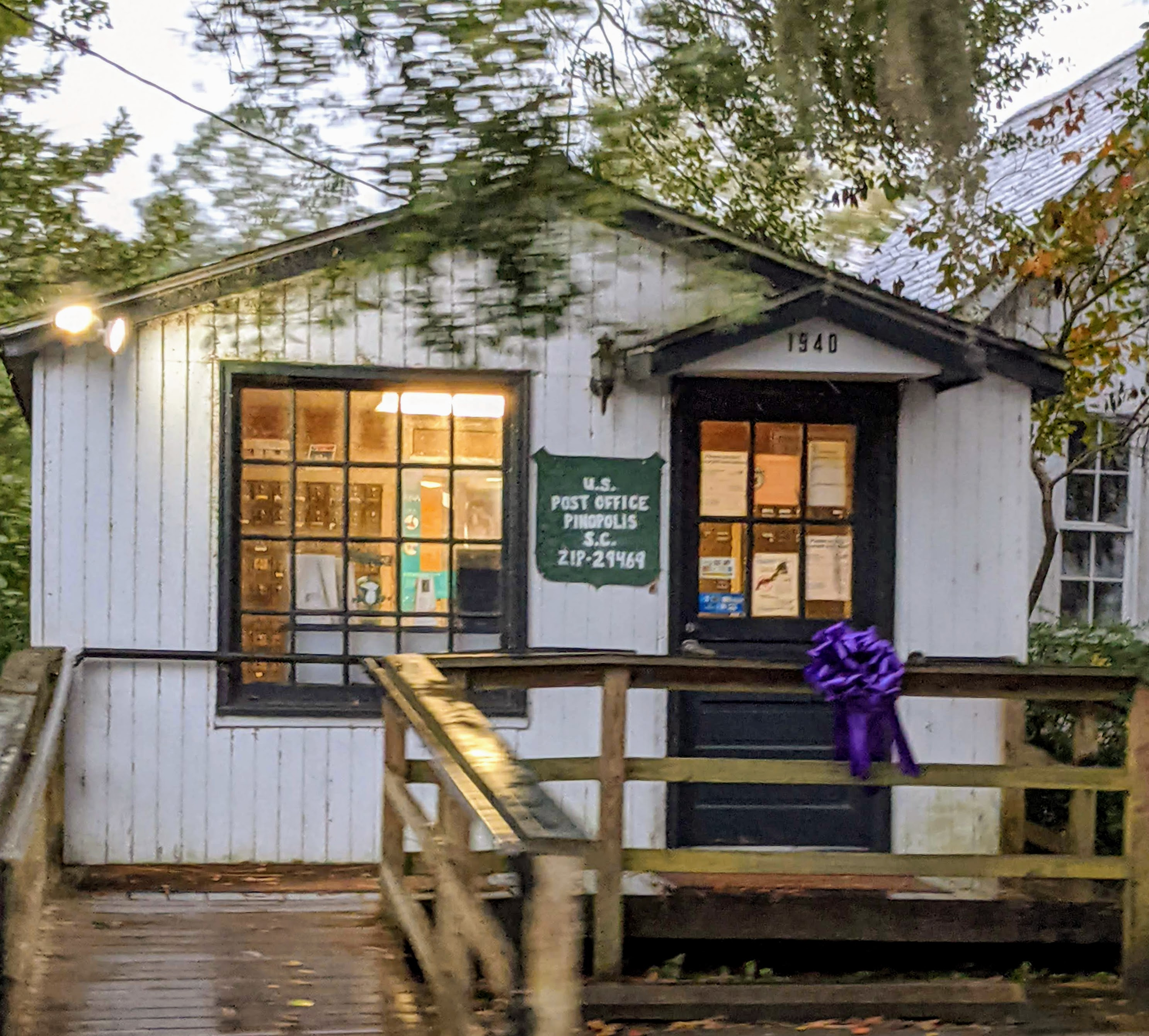
- Pinopolis Post Office

- Location within the state of South Carolina
- Coordinates: 33°13′43″N 80°02′19″W
- Country: United States
- State: South Carolina
- County: Berkeley

Area
  - Total: 1.43 sq mi (3.71 km^{2})
  - Land: 1.43 sq mi (3.71 km^{2})
  - Water: 0 sq mi (0.00 km^{2})
- Elevation: 89 ft (27 m)

Population (2020)
  - Total: 982
  - Density: 685.8/sq mi (264.77/km^{2})
- Time zone: UTC-5 (Eastern (EST))
  - Summer (DST): UTC-4 (EDT)
- ZIP code: 29469
- Area codes: 843 and 854
- FIPS code: 45-57175
- GNIS feature ID: 2584534

Pinopolis is an unincorporated community and census-designated place in Berkeley County, South Carolina, United States. As of the 2010 census it had a population of 948.

== History ==
Founded circa 1845, the community was established at a relatively high elevation in the "low country" of South Carolina, and it gave an escape from mosquitoes and uncomfortable heat. It became a gathering place for those of means during this time. It shared this aspect with other communities throughout the plantation economy of this era.

A resident spontaneously coined the name "Pinopolis" because of the many pine trees. This is probably a reflection of schooling that included references to Greek and Latin.

During the pre-Civil War period it developed in this way and maintained as a place of polish and refinement. In the post-Civil War period and during the change of the South, it became the location of the first elementary school for black students.

In 1939, the Santee Cooper Project dammed the Santee River, flooding nearly 175,000 acres (710 km^{2}) and creating Lake Moultrie with the Pinopolis Dam in 1946. Because of its high elevation, Pinopolis was spared from the flooding, and now exists as a peninsula on the lake.

The Pinopolis Historic District North, Pinopolis Historic District South, and William Robertson House are listed on the National Register of Historic Places.

== Demographics ==
Historical population
Census	Pop.	Note	%±
2020	982		—
U.S. Decennial Census
