= Pineville, South Carolina =

- Unincorporated community
- Location within South Carolina Location within the United States
- Coordinates: 33°25′42″N 80°01′45″W
- Country: United States
- State: South Carolina
- County: Berkeley
- Elevation: 82 ft (25 m)
- Time zone: UTC-5 (Eastern (EST))
  - Summer (DST): UTC-4 (EDT)
- ZIP code: 29468
- Area codes: 843, 854
- GNIS feature ID: 1225481

Pineville is an unincorporated community in Berkeley County, South Carolina, United States. The community is located on South Carolina Highway 45 6.3 miles (10.1 km) west-northwest of St. Stephen. Pineville has a post office with ZIP code 29468, which opened on March 19, 1880.

The Pineville Historic District, which is listed on the National Register of Historic Places, is located in Pineville.

Cross Generating Station is a large coal-fired power station located in Pineville.
