= Keller Site (St. Stephen, South Carolina) =

Archaeological site in South Carolina, United States

- U.S. National Register of Historic Places
- Nearest city: St. Stephen, South Carolina
- Area: 20 acres (8.1 ha)
- NRHP reference No.: 80003654
- Added to NRHP: February 1, 1980

Keller Site is a historic archaeological site located near St. Stephen, Berkeley County, South Carolina. The site is abundant in shell and other organic material and the site research indicates a strong potential for recovering features that would provide information on pre-historic and historic architecture.

It was listed in the National Register of Historic Places in 1980.
