= Loch Dhu =

Historic house in South Carolina, United States

- U.S. National Register of Historic Places
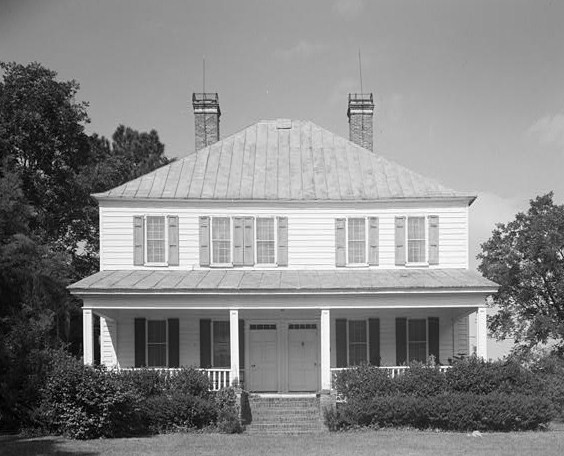
- Loch Dhu, ca. 1939

- Location within South Carolina Location within the United States
- Location: North of Cross off South Carolina Highway 6, near Eutawville, South Carolina
- Coordinates: 33°23′28″N 80°12′49″W
- Built: ca. 1812
- Architect: Kirk, Robert J.
- NRHP reference No.: 77001214
- Added to NRHP: September 22, 1977

Loch Dhu is a house in northwestern Berkeley County, South Carolina about 7 mi (11 km) east of Eutawville, South Carolina. It was built around 1812–1816. It is located close to Lake Marion about 1.3 miles (2.1 km) north of South Carolina Route 6 on Loch Dhu Lane. It was named to the National Register of Historic Places on July 13, 1977.

== History ==
The plantation house was probably built by Robert J. Kirk, who was a planter. The plantation was named Loch Dhu, which is Scottish Gaelic for "black lake" for a dark pond on the plantation. His son, Philip C. Kirk, inherited the plantation. The 1860 Agricultural Census listed 550 acres (223 ha) improved and 260 acres (105 ha) unimproved. He planted cotton, corn, and sweet potatoes. Philip Kirk also served in the South Carolina General Assembly from 1854 to 1864. He was a surgeon in the Confederate Army and used his plantation to nurse wounded soldiers.

When Lake Marion was constructed, many old plantation homes were lost to the waters. The Hanover House was moved to Clemson due to its architectural significance. Loch Dhu was on higher ground and survived. It is now on a hill with Lake Marion behind.

== Architecture ==
It is a two-story clapboard house with a hip roof. It was built around 1812. The house has a brick foundation and a one-story porch. It has two interior chimneys.

The front has two closely spaced doors that enter different rooms. There are two nine over nine lights on each side. The upper story has five nine over nine lights. The middle window is off center. All the windows on the front elevation have shutters. The side elevations have three nine over nine lights on each level. The lower windows have shutters. The rear elevation has a modern, two-story addition. The clapboard siding has been bricked over.

The interior plan has four rooms on both levels. The first story has a drawing and dining on the front and smaller rooms in the rear with no central hallway. The upper floor has four rooms with a central hall. The floors in the house are original. The drawing and dining rooms have wainscoting, which is stained in the dining room and painted in the drawing room.

Additional pictures and a sketch of the first floor plan are available. The old separate kitchen, barn, and smokehouse remain.
