= St. Stephen, South Carolina =

- Town
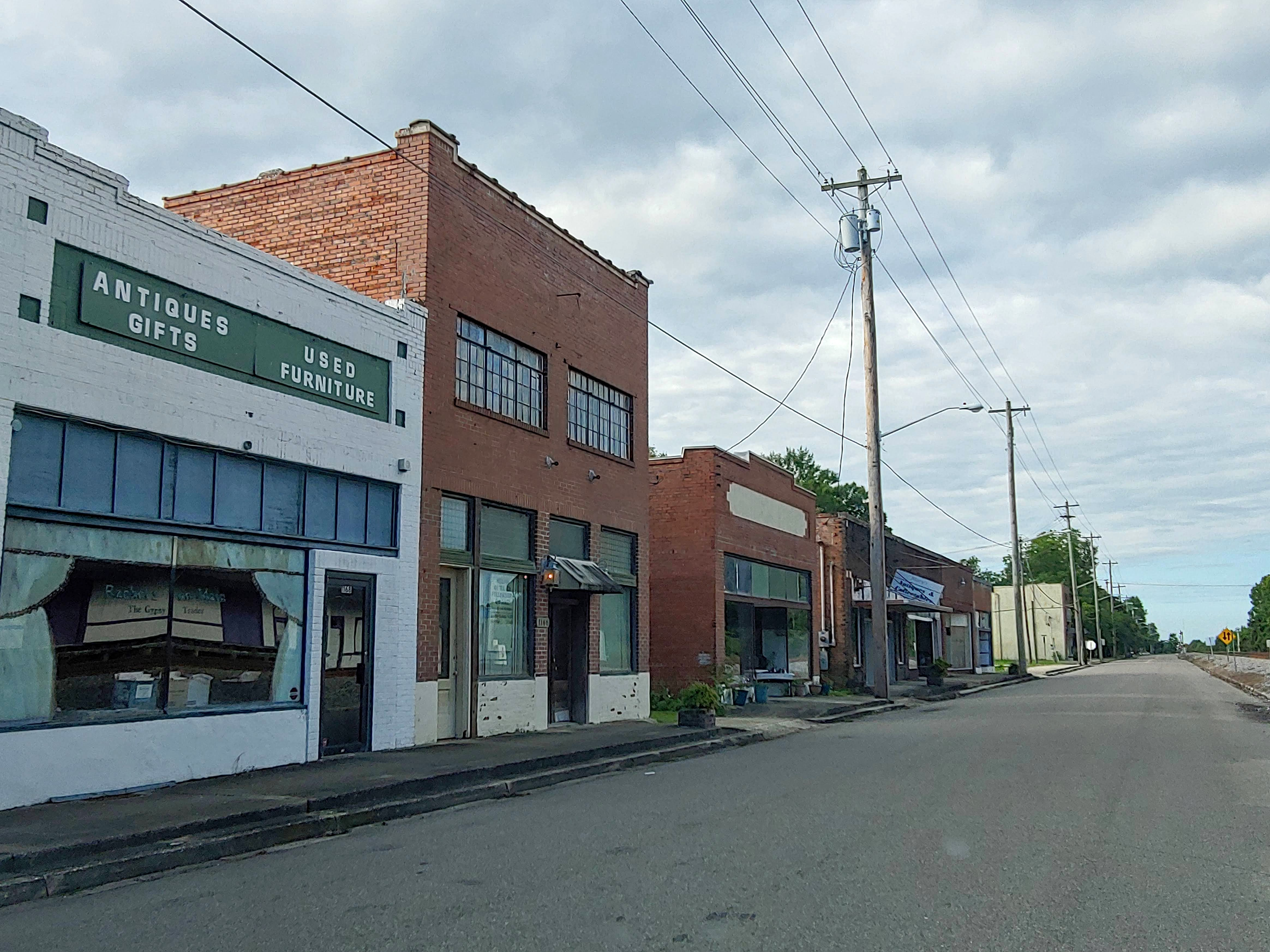
- Downtown St. Stephen, SC
- Nickname: Town across the way
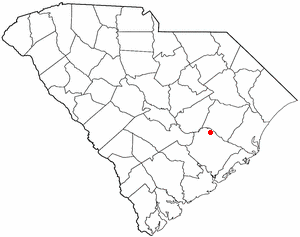
- Location of St. Stephen, South Carolina
- Coordinates: 33°24′17″N 79°55′35″W
- Country: United States
- State: South Carolina
- County: Berkeley

Area
  - Total: 2.42 sq mi (6.27 km^{2})
  - Land: 2.42 sq mi (6.27 km^{2})
  - Water: 0 sq mi (0.00 km^{2})
- Elevation: 79 ft (24 m)

Population (2020)
  - Total: 1,571
  - Density: 649.4/sq mi (250.74/km^{2})
- Time zone: UTC-5 (Eastern (EST))
  - Summer (DST): UTC-4 (EDT)
- ZIP code: 29479
- Area codes: 843 and 854
- FIPS code: 45-62755
- GNIS feature ID: 2407274
- Website: https://www.ststephensc.gov/

St. Stephen or Saint Stephen is a town in Berkeley County, South Carolina, United States. As of the 2020 census, St. Stephen had a population of 1,571.

St. Stephen is included within the Charleston-North Charleston-Summerville metropolitan area.

== History ==
The Keller Site and St. Stephen's Episcopal Church are listed on the National Register of Historic Places.

== Geography ==
St. Stephen is located in northern Berkeley County between Lake Moultrie to the west and the Santee River to the northeast. The town lies along the western edge of Francis Marion National Forest near its northernmost point.

U.S. Route 52 runs through the center of the town, leading north 25 miles (40 km) to Kingstree and south 17 miles (27 km) to Moncks Corner, the Berkeley County seat. South Carolina Highway 45 crosses US 52 in the town center and leads west 30 miles (48 km) to Eutawville and southeast 40 miles (64 km) to McClellanville near the Atlantic Ocean.

According to the United States Census Bureau, the town has a total area of 2.4 square miles (6.2 km^{2}), all of it land.

== Demographics ==
Historical population
Census	Pop.	Note	%±
1880	79		—
1890	230		191.1%
1900	256		11.3%
1910	408		59.4%
1920	312		−23.5%
1930	911		192.0%
1940	1,185		30.1%
1950	1,341		13.2%
1960	1,462		9.0%
1970	1,506		3.0%
1980	1,850		22.8%
1990	1,697		−8.3%
2000	1,776		4.7%
2010	1,697		−4.4%
2020	1,571		−7.4%
U.S. Decennial Census

=== 2020 census ===
St. Stephen racial composition
Race	Num.	Perc.
White (non-Hispanic)	657	41.82%
Black or African American (non-Hispanic)	810	51.56%
Native American	7	0.45%
Asian	7	0.45%
Pacific Islander	1	0.06%
Other/Mixed	71	4.52%
Hispanic or Latino	18	1.15%

As of the 2020 United States census, there were 1,571 people, 648 households, and 397 families residing in the town.

=== 2000 census ===
As of the census of 2000, there were 1,776 people, 640 households, and 453 families residing in the town. The population density was 722.9 people per square mile (279.1 people/km^{2}). There were 708 housing units at an average density of 288.2 per square mile (111.3/km^{2}). The racial makeup of the town was 58.22% African American, 39.92% White, 0.17% Native American, 0.11% Asian, 0.06% Pacific Islander, 0.90% from other races, and 0.62% from two or more races. Hispanic or Latino of any race were 1.52% of the population.

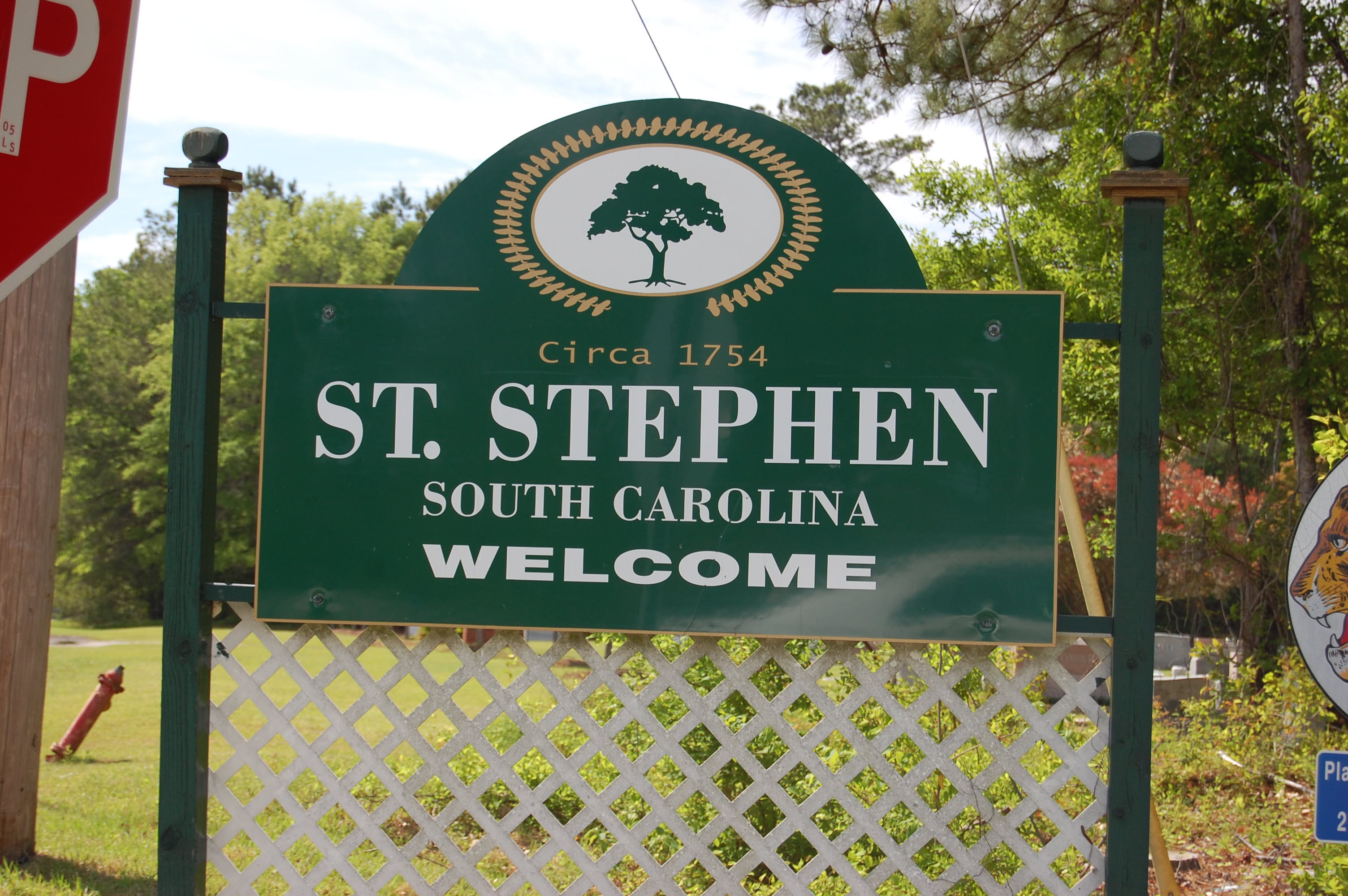
Sign entering St. Stephen

There were 640 households, out of which 37.7% had children under the age of 18 living with them, 40.0% were married couples living together, 27.0% had a female householder with no husband present, and 29.2% were non-families. 26.7% of all households were made up of individuals, and 10.5% had someone living alone who was 65 years of age or older. The average household size was 2.65 and the average family size was 3.19.

In the town, the population was spread out, with 32.8% under the age of 18, 8.7% from 18 to 24, 22.2% from 25 to 44, 21.1% from 45 to 64, and 15.2% who were 65 years of age or older. The median age was 32 years. For every 100 females, there were 80.9 males. For every 100 females age 18 and over, there were 68.2 males.

The median income for a household in the town was $20,804, and the median income for a family was $25,750. Males had a median income of $30,461 versus $17,784 for females. The per capita income for the town was $11,258. About 34.6% of families and 38.9% of the population were below the poverty line, including 55.7% of those under age 18 and 14.3% of those age 65 or over.

== Education ==
St. Stephen has a public library, a branch of the Berkeley County Library System.
