= Medway (Mount Holly, South Carolina) =

Historic house in South Carolina, United States

- U.S. National Register of Historic Places
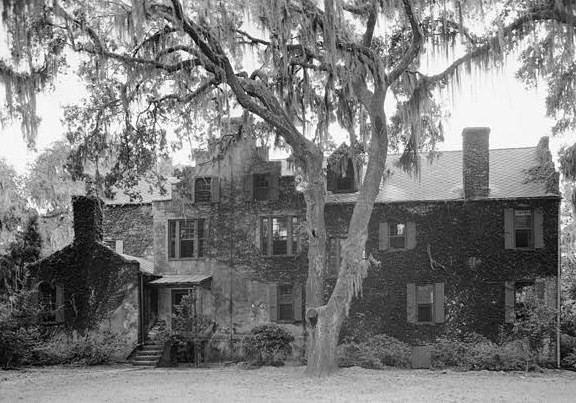
- Medway Plantation in 1940

- Location within South Carolina Location within the United States
- Location: off U.S. Route 52
- Nearest city: Goose Creek, South Carolina
- Coordinates: 33°1′52″N 79°58′14″W
- Built: ca. 1686
- Architect: Van Arrsens, Jan
- NRHP reference No.: 70000569
- Added to NRHP: July 16, 1970

Medway or the Medway Plantation is a plantation in Mount Holly, South Carolina within Berkeley County, South Carolina. It is about 2 mi (3.2 km) east of U.S. Route 52 from the unincorporated community of Mount Holly, which is directly north of Goose Creek, South Carolina. It was named to the National Register of Historic Places on July 16, 1970.

== History ==
Jan Van Arrsens, the Seigneur of Wernhaut (also "Weirnhoudt"), led a small group of settlers from Holland to the province of Carolina around 1686. He built his house on the Back River, which was formerly called the "Meadway" or "Medway" and is a tributary of the Cooper River. Van Arrsens died soon after his arrival and was buried at Medway.

His widow, Sabrina de Vignon, married Landgrave Thomas Smith around 1687, which made Smith one of the wealthiest men in the Province. Sabrina Smith died in 1689 and was buried at Medway. Thomas Smith was appointed governor of the Province of Carolina in 1693. He died in 1694 and was also buried at Medway.

After his death, the plantation went to his son, Thomas Smith II. In 1701, Smith sold it to Edward Hyrne. When Hyrne failed to pay the mortgage in 1711, it reverted to Thomas Smith II. It was sold numerous times in the 18th century. Eventually, it was purchased by Theodore Samuel Marion, who was a nephew of Francis Marion, member of the South Carolina Provincial Congress and a prominent figure in the American Revolution. In 1827, it passed on to his grandson, Theodore Samuel DuBose. In the period 1833 to 1835, Dubose sold it to his brother-in-law Peter Gaillard Stoney, who also owned the West Point Rice Mill in Charleston.

During Stoney's ownership, Medway Plantation was productive winter and summer. In the summer, rice was the principal work. During the winter, brick-making was a major activity. Medway and other plantations in the area produced "Carolina Grey" bricks from the local clay along the river bank. Medway's bricks were used in constructing buildings in Charleston and were some of bricks used to build Fort Sumter. The plantation also produced timber and some naval stores. Finally, the plantation was used for recreational hunting.

In 1906, it was purchased by Samuel Gaillard Stoney, who was a nephew of Peter Gaillard Stoney. John Bennett (1865–1956), who was a friend of Samuel and his wife, Louisa, used Medway as the setting for his novel The Treasure of Peyre Gaillard. A son of Samuel and Louisa Stoney, also named Samuel Gaillard Stoney (1891–1968), wrote Plantations of the Carolina Low Country, other books on the architecture of the South Carolina Lowcountry, and coauthored books of Gullah stories.

In 1930, Medway was purchased by Sidney and Gertrude Legendre. Sidney died in 1948 and was buried at Medway. Gertrude Sanford Legendre is best known for her experiences as a big-game hunter and as an Office of Strategic Services employee. She was the first American woman captured in World War II. After about six months' captivity, she escaped to Switzerland. Gertrude died in 2000 and was buried at Medway.

== Architecture ==
Although the tradition was that Van Arrsens built the core of the house, the discovery in 1984 that the Hyrne family seal was impressed into some of the bricks around a doorframe made it clear that Hyrne played a role in building the original house.

The house that Jan Van Arrsens built on the Medway River burned, either in 1692 or in the early 18th century after the Hyrnes bought it. The house was rebuilt using the remaining foundations and walls. This house had stepped Dutch gables. The house had entrances facing the river and on the landward side. The house was made of locally produced handmade brick that did not have the quality of bricks produced in later periods. The poorly made bricks were patched with oyster shell stucco. The house is believed to have had three rooms on the main floor.

Theodore Samuel DuBose added another story to the house in 1827, which made it a 2 1/2-story house. Peter Gaillard Stoney expanded the house by building an unsymmetrical wing toward the west in 1855. The house was expanded again by adding two rooms toward the east prior to 1875.

The house was damaged in the 1886 Charleston earthquake. The house was repaired by 1900. Samuel Gaillard Stoney rebuilt the stepped gables in 1906. Louisa Stoney restored the lawn and gardens. The Legendres revived the plantation and redecorated the house.

The original Dutch design of the house has been retained. Floor plans of the house have been published. These include a probable plan for the original house built by Van Arrsens and/or Hyrne and the current house.

== Medway today ==
Gertrude Sanford Legendre set up the Medway Environmental Trust to manage the plantation as a nature preserve. Medway Plantation has been named an Important Bird Area by Audubon South Carolina. In addition to many ducks and other waterfowl, it is home to about fifteen colonies of red-cockaded woodpeckers and a nesting pair of bald eagles.

== See also ==
- List of the oldest buildings in South Carolina
