= Cordesville, South Carolina =

- Unincorporated community
- Location within South Carolina Location within the United States
- Coordinates: 33°07′56″N 79°53′00″W
- Country: United States
- State: South Carolina
- County: Berkeley
- Elevation: 52 ft (16 m)
- Time zone: UTC-5 (Eastern (EST))
  - Summer (DST): UTC-4 (EDT)
- ZIP code: 29434
- Area codes: 843, 854
- GNIS feature ID: 1247384

Cordesville is an unincorporated community in Berkeley County, South Carolina, United States. The community is located on South Carolina Highway 402 8.7 miles (14.0 km) east-southeast of Moncks Corner. Cordesville has a post office with ZIP code 29434.
