= National Register of Historic Places listings in Charleston County, South Carolina =

Location of Charleston County in South Carolina

This is a list of the National Register of Historic Places listings in Charleston County, South Carolina.

This is intended to be a complete list of the properties and districts on the National Register of Historic Places in Charleston County, South Carolina, United States. The locations of National Register properties and districts for which the latitude and longitude coordinates are included below, may be seen in an online map.

There are 216 properties and districts listed on the National Register in the county, including 43 National Historic Landmarks. The city of Charleston is the location of 108 of these properties and districts, including 34 of the National Historic Landmarks; they are listed separately, while 111 properties and districts in the remaining parts of the county, including 9 National Historic Landmarks, are listed here. Another 5 properties in Charleston County outside Charleston were once listed but have been removed. Three properties and districts — the Ashley River Historic District, Ashley River Road, and the Secessionville Historic District — are split between the city and the other parts of the county, and are thus included on both lists.

This National Park Service list is complete through NPS recent listings posted October 16, 2026.

== Current listings ==
	Name on the Register	Image	Date listed	Location	City or town	Description
1	Angel Oak	Angel Oak	May 21, 2026 (#100013019)	3688 Angel Oak Road; 32°43′00″N 80°04′50″W	Johns Island	
2	Ashley Hall Plantation	Ashley Hall Plantation	June 5, 1975 (#75001691)	Address restricted	West Ashley	
3	Ashley River Historic District	Ashley River Historic District	September 12, 1994 (#93001514)	Roughly along the Ashley River from just east of South Carolina Highway 165, near Watson Hill (North Charleston), to the Seaboard Coast Line Railroad bridge 32°53′58″N 80°07′00″W	North Charleston	Extends into Charleston and Dorchester County
4	Ashley River Road	Ashley River Road	November 21, 1983 (#83003831)	South Carolina Highway 61 between Church Creek and South Carolina Highway 165; 32°53′43″N 80°08′08″W	Summerville	Extends into Charleston and Dorchester County
5	Atlanticville Historic District		September 6, 2007 (#07000927)	Middle St., Jasper Boulevard, and Myrtle Ave. between Stations 22½ and 26; 32°45′55″N 79°49′57″W	Sullivan's Island	
6	Auld Mound		October 15, 1970 (#70000583)	Address Restricted	Mount Pleasant	
7	Alexander Bache U.S. Coast Survey Line	Alexander Bache U.S. Coast Survey Line	October 5, 2007 (#07001082)	8377 State Cabin Rd. 32°30′20″N 80°18′37″W	Edisto Island	
8	Bailey's Store	Bailey's Store	November 28, 1986 (#86003204)	1444 South Carolina Highway 174; 32°33′36″N 80°16′47″W	Edisto Island	Now occupied by With These Hands Gallery.
9	Barnwell House		November 25, 1980 (#80003657)	South of Charleston; 32°41′54″N 80°24′22″W	Adams Run	
10	Bass Pond Site		April 24, 1979 (#79002379)	Address Restricted	Kiawah Island	
11	Battery Gadsden	Battery Gadsden	June 25, 1974 (#74001842)	2017 Ion Ave. 32°45′36″N 79°50′23″W	Sullivan's Island	Now houses the Edgar Allan Poe Branch of the Charleston County Library
12	Battery Thomson	Battery Thomson	June 25, 1974 (#74001843)	2013 Ion Ave. 32°45′33″N 79°50′28″W	Sullivan's Island	
13	Bethel African Methodist Episcopal Church	Bethel African Methodist Episcopal Church	June 22, 2004 (#04000651)	369 Drayton St. 33°05′21″N 79°27′26″W	McClellanville	
14	Bleak Hall Plantation Outbuildings	Bleak Hall Plantation Outbuildings	March 7, 1973 (#73001698)	4 miles southeast of Edisto Island off South Carolina Highway 174; 32°33′10″N 80°14′05″W	Edisto Island	
15	Brick House Ruin	Brick House Ruin	April 15, 1970 (#70000580)	South of Edisto Island; 32°36′05″N 80°19′32″W	Edisto Island	
16	Brooklands Plantation	Brooklands Plantation	May 5, 1987 (#86003198)	Off Laurel Hill Rd. on Scanawah Island; 32°34′19″N 80°21′19″W	Edisto Island	
17	Buzzard's Island Site		October 15, 1970 (#70000584)	Address Restricted	Mount Pleasant	
18	Cape Romain Lighthouses	Cape Romain Lighthouses	November 12, 1981 (#81000563)	Southeast of McClellanville on Lighthouse Island; 33°01′06″N 79°22′27″W	McClellanville	
19	Cassina Point	Cassina Point	November 28, 1986 (#86003210)	1642 Clark Road, Edisto, South Carolina; 32°35′29″N 80°15′03″W	Edisto Island	
20	Charleston Naval Hospital		January 25, 2021 (#100006050)	3600 Rivers Ave. 32°51′27″N 79°58′46″W	North Charleston	
21	Charleston Naval Hospital Historic District	Charleston Naval Hospital Historic District	October 22, 2010 (#10000851)	Former Charleston Navy Base including parts of Turnbull Avenue, Hobby Street, Avenues F-I, Truxton Avenue, and Marine Avenue; 32°51′51″N 79°58′02″W	North Charleston	
22	Charleston Navy Yard Historic District	Charleston Navy Yard Historic District	August 9, 2006 (#06000699)	Roughly bounded by 1st St., Hobson Ave., Ave. D, 4th and 5th Sts., and the drydocks between 1st and 13th Sts. 32°51′43″N 79°57′46″W	North Charleston	
23	Charleston Navy Yard Officers' Quarters Historic District	Charleston Navy Yard Officers' Quarters Historic District	March 2, 2007 (#07000100)	Turnbull Ave., Everglades Dr., Navy Way, and portions of Hobson Ave. and Blackstop Dr. 32°52′08″N 79°58′09″W	North Charleston	
24	Chicora Graded School		May 29, 2026 (#100013066)	1912 Success Street; 32°51′21″N 79°58′08″W	North Charleston	
25	Christ Church	Christ Church	November 27, 1972 (#72001201)	2304 Highway 17N; 32°50′38″N 79°48′50″W	Mount Pleasant	
26	Cook's Old Field Cemetery		May 9, 2003 (#01000679)	0.5 miles north of Rifle Range Rd. 32°50′20″N 79°48′13″W	Mount Pleasant	
27	Crawford's Plantation House	Crawford's Plantation House	June 8, 1993 (#93000475)	8202 Oyster Factory Rd. 32°32′15″N 80°18′16″W	Edisto Island	
28	Edisto Island Baptist Church	Edisto Island Baptist Church	April 1, 1982 (#82003839)	1644 South Carolina Highway 174; 32°34′22″N 80°17′03″W	Edisto Island	
29	Edisto Island Presbyterian Church	Edisto Island Presbyterian Church	June 24, 1971 (#71000754)	1.9 miles north of Edisto Island on South Carolina Highway 174; 32°34′44″N 80°17′49″W	Edisto Island	
30	Engineering-Management Building	Engineering-Management Building	September 4, 2020 (#100005002)	2260 Noisette Blvd. 32°51′55″N 79°58′16″W	North Charleston	
31	Fairfield Plantation	Fairfield Plantation	July 25, 1974 (#74001838)	North of McClellanville; 33°10′58″N 79°24′18″W	McClellanville	
32	Fig Island Site		October 15, 1970 (#70000585)	Address Restricted	Edisto Island	
33	Folly North Site-38CH1213		October 2, 2003 (#03001001)	Address Restricted	Folly Beach	
34	Fort Johnson/Powder Magazine	Fort Johnson/Powder Magazine	September 14, 1972 (#72001197)	East end of Ft. Johnson Road, in South Carolina Department of Natural Resources compound 32°45′08″N 79°53′55″W	James Island	
35	Fort Moultrie Quartermaster and Support Facilities Historic District	Fort Moultrie Quartermaster and Support Facilities Historic District	September 6, 2007 (#07000925)	Middle St. and Thompson Ave., between Stations 14 and 16.5; 32°45′35″N 79°51′11″W	Sullivan's Island	
36	Fort Palmetto		August 11, 1982 (#82003842)	Christ Church Parish; 32°49′23″N 79°45′56″W	Hamlin Sound	
37	Fort Pemberton Site		November 21, 1978 (#78002498)	Shoreline of the Stono River on the northwestern corner of James Island; 32°45′35″N 80°00′03″W	James Island	
38	Frogmore		May 5, 1987 (#86003203)	South of Pine Landing Rd. near the intersection of South Carolina Highway 174 and Laurel Hill Rd. 32°35′16″N 80°21′21″W	Edisto Island	
39	General Asbestos and Rubber Company (GARCO) Main Mill	General Asbestos and Rubber Company (GARCO) Main Mill	February 28, 2017 (#100000687)	0 O'Hear Ave. 32°53′01″N 79°58′30″W	North Charleston	
40	Paul Grimball House Ruins		November 28, 1986 (#86003190)	Address Restricted	Edisto Island	
41	Grove Plantation	Grove Plantation	August 25, 1978 (#78002495)	Southwest of Adams Run off South Carolina Highway 174; 32°39′54″N 80°23′37″W	Adams Run	
42	H. L. Hunley (submarine)	H. L. Hunley (submarine)	December 29, 1978 (#78003412)	Located on the old Naval base in North Charleston; 32°44′00″N 79°46′00″W	North Charleston	
43	Hampton Plantation	Hampton Plantation	April 15, 1970 (#70000582)	1950 Rutledge Rd. 33°12′01″N 79°26′09″W	McClellanville	
44	Hanckel Mound		October 15, 1970 (#70000586)	Address Restricted	Rockville	
45	Harrietta Plantation	Harrietta Plantation	September 18, 1975 (#75001695)	5 miles east of McClellanville off U.S. Route 17; 33°10′10″N 79°23′37″W	McClellanville	
46	Hebron Presbyterian Church		April 28, 2025 (#100011785)	4058 Betsy Kerrison Parkway; 32°38′01″N 80°08′56″W	Johns Island	
47	Horse Island		November 10, 1970 (#70000587)	Address Restricted	Rockville	
48	Host of America Motel	Host of America Motel	September 25, 2020 (#100005609)	3245 Rivers Ave. 32°51′12″N 79°58′21″W	North Charleston	
49	Hutchinson House	Hutchinson House	May 5, 1987 (#86003218)	7666 Point of Pines Rd. 32°34′12″N 80°15′26″W	Edisto Island	
50	John's Island Presbyterian Church	John's Island Presbyterian Church	November 3, 1975 (#75001692)	10 miles west of Charleston on South Carolina Highway 20; 32°41′12″N 80°04′56″W	Johns Island	
51	King Cemetery		June 13, 2000 (#00000586)	1.1 miles northeast of the junction of U.S. Route 17 and S-19-38; 32°46′10″N 80°22′51″W	Adams Run	
52	Lawton-Seabrook Cemetery		June 12, 2017 (#100001075)	7938 Steamboat Landing Rd. 32°35′24″N 80°17′42″W	Edisto Island	
53	Sol Legare School		September 14, 2026 (#100013382)	Address Restricted; 32°40′39″N 79°58′27″W	James Island	1964 Sol Legare Road
54	Lighthouse Point Shell Ring (38CH12)		October 14, 1990 (#90001505)	Address Restricted	James Island	
55	Long Point Plantation (38CH321)		March 20, 1986 (#86000468)	Address Restricted	Mount Pleasant	
56	Lucas Family Cemetery	Lucas Family Cemetery	May 18, 1998 (#98000425)	Ellen Dr. 32°47′45″N 79°52′18″W	Mount Pleasant	
57	Magnolia Plantation and Gardens	Magnolia Plantation and Gardens	December 11, 1972 (#72001198)	10 miles northwest of Charleston on South Carolina Highway 61; 32°52′29″N 80°05′21″W	West Ashley	
58	Marine Barracks, Charleston Navy Yard	Marine Barracks, Charleston Navy Yard	October 16, 2020 (#100005676)	Truxtun Ave. between Marine and Goldberg Aves. 32°51′48″N 79°58′26″W	North Charleston	
59	Marshlands Plantation House	Marshlands Plantation House	March 30, 1973 (#73001700)	Northern side of Fort Sumter Dr. 32°45′01″N 79°54′03″W	James Island	The house was moved from its original location at the old Naval Base in North Charleston for preservation.
60	McClellanville Historic District		March 23, 1982 (#82003845)	Pinckney, Lofton, Charlotte, Church, Water, Oak, Venning, Legare, Morrison, and Scotia Sts. 33°05′06″N 79°27′43″W	McClellanville	
61	McClellanville U.S. Biological Survey Station		September 29, 2026 (#100013455)	405 and 401 Pinckney Street; 33°04′53″N 79°27′31″W	McClellanville	
62	W. Gresham Meggett High and Elementary School		February 20, 2018 (#100002098)	1929 Grimball Rd. 32°42′25″N 79°58′34″W	Charleston vicinity	
63	Middleton's Plantation		May 6, 1971 (#71000755)	3.5 miles north of Edisto Island off South Carolina Highway 174; 32°33′25″N 80°19′48″W	Edisto Island	Not to be confused with Middleton Place in nearby Dorchester County
64	Morris Island Lighthouse	Morris Island Lighthouse	June 28, 1982 (#82003837)	6 mi. SE of Charleston; 32°42′06″N 79°53′59″W	Folly Beach	https://catalog.archives.gov/id/118997393
65	Mosquito Beach Historic District	Mosquito Beach Historic District	September 23, 2019 (#100004409)	Mosquito Beach Rd. 32°40′22″N 79°58′57″W	James Island vicinity	
66	Moultrieville Historic District	Moultrieville Historic District	September 6, 2007 (#07000928)	Middle St. and Osceola Ave., between stations 11 and 12; 32°45′39″N 79°51′33″W	Sullivan's Island	Includes several late-19th and early-20th century beach houses and Stella Maris Church designed by John Henry Devereux
67	Mount Pleasant Historic District	Mount Pleasant Historic District	March 30, 1973 (#73001701)	Bounded by Charleston Harbor, Shem Creek, Royall Ave., and McCants Dr. 32°47′10″N 79°52′33″W	Mount Pleasant	
68	Moving Star Hall		June 17, 1982 (#82003843)	River Rd. 32°40′55″N 80°01′33″W	Johns Island	
69	Oak Island	Oak Island	November 28, 1986 (#86003202)	1 mile off Oak Island Rd. on Westbank Creek; 32°35′39″N 80°15′05″W	Edisto Island	
70	Oakland Plantation House	Oakland Plantation House	July 13, 1977 (#77001218)	7 miles north of Charleston Harbor on U.S. Route 17; 32°51′59″N 79°45′18″W	Mount Pleasant	
71	Old Courthouse	Old Courthouse	May 6, 1971 (#71000760)	331 King St. 32°47′06″N 79°51′50″W	Mount Pleasant	
72	Old Georgetown Road		June 27, 2014 (#14000382)	Old Georgetown Road between south bank of the South Santee River and SC 45; 33°09′15″N 79°28′46″W	McClellanville	
73	Old House Plantation	Old House Plantation	May 14, 1971 (#71000756)	Northeast of Edisto Island via South Carolina Highway 174; also 0.5 miles east of the junction of South Carolina Highway 174 and Oak Island Rd., then right on a dirt road 32°34′49″N 80°15′37″W	Edisto Island	Second address represents a boundary increase of May 5, 1987
74	Dr. John B. Patrick House	Dr. John B. Patrick House	February 9, 1995 (#94001628)	1820 Middle St. 32°45′35″N 79°50′36″W	Sullivan's Island	
75	Peter's Point Plantation	Peter's Point Plantation	June 19, 1973 (#73001699)	9084 Peter's Point Road, Edisto, South Carolina; 32°32′19″N 80°20′22″W	Edisto Island	
76	Phillips Community Historic District		September 7, 2023 (#100008589)	SC 41, approx. between Virginia Rouse and Joe Rouse Rds., roughly bounded by Horlbeck Cr., Dunes West, and Park West; 32°52′59″N 79°48′39″W	Mount Pleasant vicinity	
77	Presbyterian Manse		May 14, 1971 (#71000757)	Northwest of Edisto Island off South Carolina Highway 174; 32°34′04″N 80°18′34″W	Edisto Island	
78	Paul Pritchard Shipyard		September 17, 1974 (#74001839)	Address Restricted	Mount Pleasant	
79	The Progressive Club	The Progressive Club	October 24, 2007 (#07001109)	3377 River Rd. 32°40′37″N 80°02′26″W	Johns Island	
80	Prospect Hill	Prospect Hill	November 28, 1986 (#86003196)	Off Laurel Hill Rd. 32°34′54″N 80°23′04″W	Edisto Island	
81	River Road		June 3, 2026 (#100013094)	East of the intersection of Bohicket Road and Betsy Kerrison Parkway (S-10-20) and east of the intersection of State Road S-10-54 (Chisolm Road) and Main Road; 32°40′30″N 80°03′01″W	Johns Island	
82	Rockville Historic District	Rockville Historic District	June 13, 1972 (#72001202)	Town of Rockville on the northern bank of Bohicket Creek; 32°36′18″N 80°11′35″W	Rockville	
83	St. James Episcopal Church, Santee	St. James Episcopal Church, Santee	April 15, 1970 (#70000581)	17 miles south of Georgetown on the Santee River; 33°10′19″N 79°27′56″W	Georgetown	
84	Scanlonville Cemetery	Scanlonville Cemetery	September 18, 2026 (#02000570)	0.2 miles northeast of the junction of 3rd and 4th Aves. 32°48′51″N 79°53′53″W	Mount Pleasant	Listed as Remley Point Cemetery in 2002. Relisted as Scanlonville Cemetery in 2026.
85	John Seabrook Plantation Bridge		October 9, 1974 (#74001841)	Northwest of Rockville off South Carolina Highway 700; 32°37′38″N 80°12′37″W	Rockville	
86	John Seabrook Plantation Bridge		October 9, 1974 (#74001841)	Northwest of Rockville off South Carolina Highway 700; 32°37′38″N 80°12′37″W	Rockville	
87	William Seabrook House	William Seabrook House	May 6, 1971 (#71000758)	North of Edisto Island off South Carolina Highway 174; 32°36′06″N 80°16′53″W	Edisto Island	
88	Seashore Farmers' Lodge No. 767	Seashore Farmers' Lodge No. 767	October 3, 2007 (#07001043)	Northeastern corner of the junction of Sol Legare and Old Sol Legare Rds. 32°40′54″N 79°58′02″W	James Island	
89	Seaside Plantation House	Seaside Plantation House	January 21, 1982 (#82003840)	Off South Carolina Highway 174; 32°31′14″N 80°17′23″W	Edisto Island	
90	Seaside School		June 17, 1994 (#94000602)	1097 South Carolina Highway 174; 32°32′51″N 80°16′54″W	Edisto Island	
91	Secessionville Historic District	Secessionville Historic District	October 1, 1979 (#79002378)	North of Folly Beach; 32°42′18″N 79°56′35″W	Folly Beach	Extends into Charleston
92	Sewee Mound	Sewee Mound	October 15, 1970 (#70000571)	Salt Pond Road (FS Road 243); 32°59′48″N 79°36′37″W	Awendaw	
93	Slave Street, Smokehouse, and Allee, Boone Hall Plantation	Slave Street, Smokehouse, and Allee, Boone Hall Plantation	July 14, 1983 (#93001512)	North of Mt. Pleasant off U.S. Route 17; also Long Point Rd. west of its junction with U.S. Routes 17/701; 32°51′29″N 79°49′23″W	Mount Pleasant	Second location represents a boundary increase of January 21, 1994, the Boone Hall Plantation House and Historic Landscape
94	Snee Farm-Charles Pinckney National Historic Site	Snee Farm-Charles Pinckney National Historic Site	April 13, 1973 (#73001702)	6 miles west of Mt. Pleasant at 1254 Long Point Rd. 32°50′46″N 79°49′29″W	Mount Pleasant	Boundary increase approved October 10, 2021.
95	Stono River Slave Rebellion Site	Stono River Slave Rebellion Site	May 30, 1974 (#74001840)	Off U.S. Route 17 on the western bank of the Wallace River; 32°47′14″N 80°08′44″W	Rantowles	
96	Sullivan's Island Historic District	Sullivan's Island Historic District	September 6, 2007 (#07000929)	Middle St., I'on Ave., and Central Ave. between Stations 17 and 18½; 32°45′33″N 79°50′45″W	Sullivan's Island	
97	Summit Plantation House	Summit Plantation House	July 28, 1983 (#83002188)	Off County Road 390; 32°41′37″N 80°17′10″W	Adams Run	
98	Sunnyside	Sunnyside	November 28, 1986 (#86003216)	Off the northern side of Peter's Point Rd.; also north of the junction of Peters Point and Creekwood Rd. 32°33′57″N 80°17′50″W	Edisto Island	A plantation on Edisto Island. Second location represents a boundary increase, the Sunnyside Plantation Foreman's House
99	Towles Farmstead		January 21, 1994 (#93001513)	4595 and 4611 Towles Rd. 32°43′14″N 80°11′06″W	Meggett	
100	Hephzibah Jenkins Townsend's Tabby Oven Ruins		May 5, 1987 (#86003200)	Address Restricted	Edisto Island	
101	Trinity Church	Trinity Church	May 14, 1971 (#71000759)	1589 South Carolina Highway 174; 32°34′10″N 80°17′01″W	Edisto Island	
102	U.S. Coast Guard Historic District	U.S. Coast Guard Historic District	June 19, 1973 (#73001703)	Ion Ave. between Station 18 and Station 18½; 32°45′27″N 79°50′33″W	Sullivan's Island	
103	Unnamed Battery No. 1		August 11, 1982 (#82003838)	Clark's Point; 32°43′15″N 79°56′07″W	James Island	
104	USS CLAMAGORE (SS-343)	USS CLAMAGORE (SS-343)	June 29, 1989 (#89001229)	Patriot's Point; 32°47′23″N 79°54′28″W	Mount Pleasant	Scrapped in 2022; landmark designation withdrawn in 2024.
105	USS LAFFEY	USS LAFFEY	April 12, 1983 (#83002189)	West of Mt. Pleasant on the eastern side of Charleston Harbor; 32°47′23″N 79°54′28″W	Mount Pleasant	
106	USS YORKTOWN (CV-10)	USS YORKTOWN (CV-10)	November 10, 1982 (#82001519)	West of Mt. Pleasant on the eastern side of Charleston Harbor; 32°47′26″N 79°54′31″W	Mount Pleasant	
107	Arnoldus Vander Horst House		October 25, 1973 (#73001697)	25 miles southwest of Charleston on Kiawah Island; 32°37′00″N 80°04′24″W	Kiawah Island	
108	The Wedge	The Wedge	November 25, 1980 (#80003660)	Northeast of McClellanville; 33°10′17″N 79°23′57″W	McClellanville	
109	Wescott Road	Wescott Road	November 28, 1986 (#86003195)	West of South Carolina Highway 174; 32°33′44″N 80°16′53″W	Edisto Island	
110	Wilkinson-Boineau House	Wilkinson-Boineau House	January 21, 1999 (#98001644)	5185 South Carolina Highway 174; 32°43′10″N 80°20′56″W	Adams Run	
111	Willtown Bluff	Willtown Bluff	January 8, 1974 (#74001830)	Southwest of Adams Run at the end of County Road 55 on the banks of the S. Edisto River; 32°40′54″N 80°24′54″W	Adams Run	
112	Windsor Plantation		July 23, 1974 (#74001837)	East of South Carolina Highway 174 near Little Edisto; 32°35′58″N 80°20′41″W	Edisto Island	

== Former listings ==
	Name on the Register	Image	Date listed	Date removed	Location	City or town	Description
1	Laurel Hill		September 23, 1985 (#85002359)	March 15, 2000		McClellanville	Destroyed by Hurricane Hugo on September 21, 1989.
2	Point of Pines Plantation Slave Cabin		November 28, 1986 (#86003213)	October 23, 2013	Point of Pines Rd. 32°34′39″N 80°14′25″W	Edisto Island	Moved to the National Museum of African American History and Culture in Washington, D.C. in May 2013.
3	NS Savannah	NS Savannah	November 14, 1982 (#82001518)	December 8, 2005	Partiot's Points	Mount Pleasant	Moved to Newport News, Virginia
4	Williams Graded School		August 21, 1980 (#80003659)	January 27, 1983	Pinckney St.	Lincolnville	Destroyed by arsonist on June 20, 1982.

== See also ==
- List of National Historic Landmarks in South Carolina
- National Register of Historic Places listings in South Carolina
