= The Notebook =

2004 American romantic drama film by Nick Cassavetes

- Theatrical release poster
- Directed by: Nick Cassavetes
- Screenplay by: Jeremy Leven
- Adaptation by: Jan Sardi
- Based on: The Notebook by Nicholas Sparks
- Produced by: Mark Johnson; Lynn Harris
- Starring: Ryan Gosling; Rachel McAdams; James Garner; Gena Rowlands; James Marsden; Kevin Connolly; Sam Shepard; Joan Allen
- Cinematography: Robert Fraisse
- Edited by: Alan Heim
- Music by: Aaron Zigman
- Production company: Gran Via
- Distributed by: New Line Cinema
- Release dates: May 20, 2004 (Seattle); June 25, 2004 (United States)
- Running time: 123 minutes
- Country: United States
- Language: English
- Budget: $29 million
- Box office: $118.3 million

The Notebook is a 2004 American romantic drama film directed by Nick Cassavetes, from a screenplay by Jeremy Leven and Jan Sardi, and based on the 1996 novel by Nicholas Sparks. The film stars Ryan Gosling and Rachel McAdams as a young couple who fall in love in the 1940s. Their story is read from a notebook in the modern day by an elderly man telling the tale to a fellow nursing home resident.

The Notebook had its world premiere at the Seattle International Film Festival on May 20, 2004, and was theatrically released in the United States on June 25, by New Line Cinema. Despite generally mixed reviews from critics, Gosling and McAdams were singled out for praise for their performances. The film was a sleeper hit at the box office, grossing $118.3 million against its $29 million budget, and has become a cult classic in the years since its release. On November 11, 2012, an extended version premiered on ABC Family with deleted scenes added back into the original storyline.

The film earned several accolades, including the MTV Movie Award for Best Kiss for Gosling and McAdams at the 2005 MTV Movie Awards. At the 11th Screen Actors Guild Awards, James Garner was nominated for Outstanding Performance by a Male Actor in a Supporting Role and the director's mother, Gena Rowlands, won Best Supporting Actress – Drama at the 9th Golden Satellite Awards.

== Plot ==
In the present day, an elderly man named Duke reads a romantic story from a notebook to a female patient in their nursing home.

The story opens in 1940 at a carnival in Seabrook Island, South Carolina. Lumber mill worker Noah Calhoun sees 17-year-old heiress Allison "Allie" Hamilton and immediately falls in love with her. He pursues her, woos her into dating him, and they begin a romance. Noah and Allie fall head-over-heels in love despite their differences.

Near the end of the summer, Noah learns that Allie will attend Sarah Lawrence College in New York in the fall. He takes her to Windsor Plantation, telling her about his dream to repair its abandoned house. They try to have sex, but things are a bit awkward since they both are not sure what to do and a nervous Allie can't stop talking. They are interrupted by their friend Fin who tells them that Allie's parents have summoned the police to find her.

When Allie and Noah return to her parents' mansion, Allie's mother, Anne, who thinks working-class Noah is not good enough for Allie, forbids her from seeing him. Noah overhears the conversation and admits to Allie he does not see a future for them. A distraught Allie breaks up with him, but immediately regrets the decision.

The next morning, Anne announces they will be returning to Charleston immediately. Allie rushes to the lumber mill to apologize to Noah, but he is away; she asks Fin to tell him she loves him. Noah rushes to Allie's home when the message is delivered, but she has already left.

Noah writes to Allie every day for a year, but Allie's mother intercepts the letters. When the US joins World War II, Noah and Fin enlist and fight in the Battle of the Bulge, where Fin is killed. Meanwhile, Allie nurses soldiers in a hospital, meeting wounded Captain Lon Hammond Jr., a young lawyer who comes from old Southern money. After a few years, they become engaged, to Allie's parents' delight.

Noah returns from the war, to find his father has sold their home so Noah can buy the Windsor Plantation. Soon after, his father dies, and Noah begins repairing the house. Noah cannot bring himself to sell the house since it connects him to Allie. Out of loneliness, Noah has a casual relationship with a war widow named Martha Shaw.

As Allie tries on her wedding dress, she sees a newspaper photo of Noah in front of his renovated house and faints. Allie's feelings for Noah resurface, so she decides to travel to Seabrook. There, she comes face to face with Noah for the first time in seven years. They have a pleasant afternoon catching up and Noah invites Allie to come over again the next day. After a romantic boat ride, Allie emotionally confronts Noah about why he did not write to her all those years ago. Noah tells her he did write to her and they kiss. They go back to the house and have sex.

Allie and Noah spend the next couple of days in romantic bliss. Anne arrives to warn Allie that Lon has come to Seabrook. She reveals that she once also loved a lower-class man and wonders what their lives would have been like had she chosen differently. Anne gives Noah's letters to Allie and suggests she choose wisely.

Allie admits to Noah she does not know what to do and this leads to an explosive argument between the pair. Noah tells Allie she has to choose who she truly wants to be with. Allie drives back to her hotel and confesses her infidelity to Lon. Lon forgives her and still wants to marry her. Ultimately, Allie follows her heart and returns to Noah.

Back in the present, the elderly woman is revealed to be Allie, now suffering from dementia. Duke is actually Noah, who uses a pseudonym to not startle her in her disoriented state. The story he reads to her is in her notebook, detailing their romance and life together so he could help her remember him. Noah has kept his promise to read it to her daily.

When Noah finishes the story, Allie remembers it is their story. Allie and Noah emotionally embrace and Noah tells Allie they only have a few minutes before she will forget again. They dance to their song, "I'll Be Seeing You", and she asks about their children. Right after, Allie's dementia quickly returns and she panics, seeing him as a stranger and she is sedated. Later, Noah has a heart attack, while Allie is taken to a dementia ward. After his recovery, Noah sneaks into Allie's room in the night. Allie recognizes him and they kiss. The next morning, their bodies are found after they have both died in their sleep, holding hands.

== Cast ==
- Ryan Gosling as Noah Calhoun (young)
  - James Garner as Duke / Noah (old)
- Rachel McAdams as Allison "Allie" Calhoun (née Hamilton) (young)
  - Gena Rowlands as Allie (old)
- Sam Shepard as Frank Calhoun, Noah's father
- Joan Allen as Anne Hamilton, Allie's mother
- James Marsden as Lon Hammond Jr.
- Kevin Connolly as Fin
- David Thornton as John Hamilton, Allie's father
- Jamie Brown as Martha Shaw
- Heather Wahlquist as Sara Tuffington
- Ed Grady as Harry
- Obba Babatunde as Bandleader
- Starletta DuPois as Nurse Esther
- Paul Johansson as Anne Hamilton's ex-boyfriend (uncredited)

== Production ==
The film rights to Nicholas Sparks' novel were acquired by New Line Cinema in 1996, represented by producer Mark Johnson. Jeremy Leven was hired to write the script, which caught the attention of director Steven Spielberg in 1998, who wished to film it with Tom Cruise as Noah Calhoun. Spielberg's commitment to other projects led to Jim Sheridan becoming attached to direct the following year. M. Night Shyamalan was also approached to direct but couldn't do it due to commitments to The Sixth Sense. Filming was to start in 1999 but pushed back over rewrites. Sheridan eventually backed out by October 2000 to work on In America. Martin Campbell entered negotiations to direct in March 2001, before he was replaced by Nick Cassavetes a year later. Early in development George Clooney was going to play Noah, and Paul Newman the older Noah, but after Clooney watched some Paul Newman movies he went up to Newman and said he did not look like him.

=== Casting ===
Cassavetes wanted someone unknown and "not handsome" to portray Noah; Hayden Christensen was considered for the role, but Cassavetes ultimately chose Ryan Gosling for the role. Gosling was initially surprised by this: "I read [the script] and I thought, 'He's crazy. I couldn't be more wrong for this movie.'" "It gave me an opportunity to play a character over a period of time – from 1940 to 1946 – that was quite profound and formative." To prepare for the part, Gosling temporarily moved to Charleston, South Carolina, prior to filming. During two months, he rowed the Ashley River and made furniture. When James Garner was approached for the role of the older Noah, he asked his agent if the script was for a television film, until he read it again and realized it had a universal appeal. A nationwide search was conducted to find the right actress to play Allie. Actresses who auditioned or considered for the role included Jessica Biel, Britney Spears, Jaime King, Jane McGregor, Kate Beckinsale, Kate Bosworth, Amy Adams, Mandy Moore, Scarlett Johansson, Claire Danes, Jennifer Love Hewitt, Ashley Judd, and Reese Witherspoon, with the choice narrowed down to Britney Spears and Rachel McAdams with McAdams winning the role. On casting her, Cassavetes said: "When Rachel McAdams came in and read, it was apparent that she was the one. She and Ryan had great chemistry between them." She commented: "I thought it would be a dream to be able to do it. I read the script and went into the audition just two days later. It was a good way to do it because I was very full of the story." Gosling commented that, "I think that it's pretty fair to say that we probably wouldn't have made the film if we hadn't found Rachel... Really, Allie drives the movie. It's her movie and we're in it. It all kind of depended on an actress." In comparison to the book, the role was extended. McAdams spent time in Charleston before filming to familiarize herself with the surroundings, and took ballet and etiquette classes. She had a dialect coach to learn the Southern accent. Bradley Cooper was considered for Lon Hammond, while the studio pushed for Cole Hauser; but James Marsden was eventually cast.

=== Filming ===
The Notebook was filmed mostly on location in South Carolina, as well as the wintery battlefield just outside Montreal. Production offices for the film were set up at the old Charleston Naval Shipyard in North Charleston.

Much of the film's plot takes place in and around Seabrook Island, an actual town which is one of the South Carolina "sea island" localities, located 20 miles (32 km) southwest of Charleston. None of the filming took place in the Seabrook area, however, and instead utilized the surrounding areas. Specifically, the house that Noah is seen fixing up is a private residence at Wadmalaw Island, another locality situated 10 miles (16 km) closer to Charleston. The house was not actually in a dilapidated state at the time and instead was made to look that way by special effects. Contrary to the suggestion in the film's dialogue, neither the house nor the Seabrook area was home to South Carolina Revolutionary hero Francis Marion, whose plantation was actually located northwest of Charleston. The Boone Hall Plantation served as Allie's summer house.

Many of the scenes set in Seabrook were filmed in the town of Mt. Pleasant, a suburb of Charleston. Other locations included Edisto Island, Cypress Gardens (in Moncks Corner, South Carolina) with trained birds that were brought in from elsewhere.

The nursing home scenes were filmed at Rice Hope Plantation, located in Georgetown County. The college depicted briefly in the film is identified in the film as Sarah Lawrence College, but the campus that is seen is the College of Charleston.

== Music ==
The soundtrack to The Notebook was released on June 8, 2004.

No.	Title	Artist	Length
1.	"Main Title"	Aaron Zigman	2:49
2.	"Overture"	Aaron Zigman	6:16
3.	"I'll Be Seeing You"	Billie Holiday	3:33
4.	"Alabamy Home"	Duke Ellington	3:02
5.	"Allie Returns"	Aaron Zigman	5:07
6.	"House Blues / The Porch Dance / The Proposal / The Carnival"	Aaron Zigman	8:04
7.	"Noah's Journey"	Aaron Zigman	6:03
8.	"Always and Always"	Benny Goodman & His Orchestra	3:17
9.	"A String of Pearls"	Glenn Miller & His Orchestra	3:16
10.	"On the Lake"	Aaron Zigman	5:39
11.	"Diga Diga Doo"	Rex Stewart and the Ellingtonians	4:16
12.	"One O'Clock Jump"	Benny Goodman & His Orchestra	3:15
13.	"I'll Be Seeing You"	Jimmy Durante	3:13
14.	"Noah's Last Letter"	Aaron Zigman	4:32
15.	"Our Love Can Do Miracles"	Aaron Zigman	4:31
Total length:			66:53

== Reception ==
=== Box office ===
The film was released on June 25, 2004, in the United States and Canada and grossed $13.5 million from 2,303 theaters in its opening weekend, ranking number 4 at the box office. The film grossed a total of $115.6 million worldwide, $81 million in Canada and the United States and $34.6 million in other countries. It is the 15th highest-grossing romantic drama film of all time.

=== Critical response ===
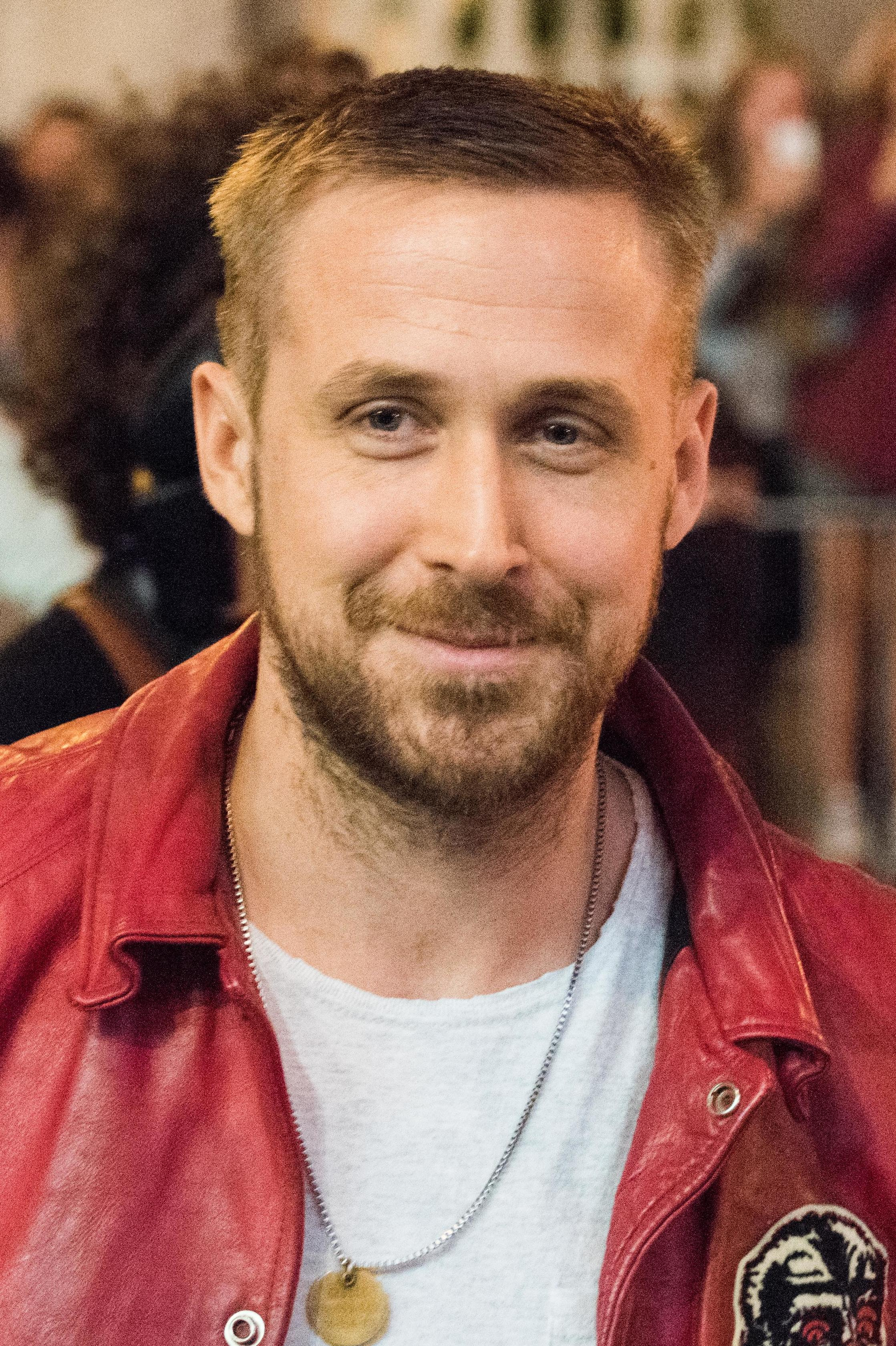
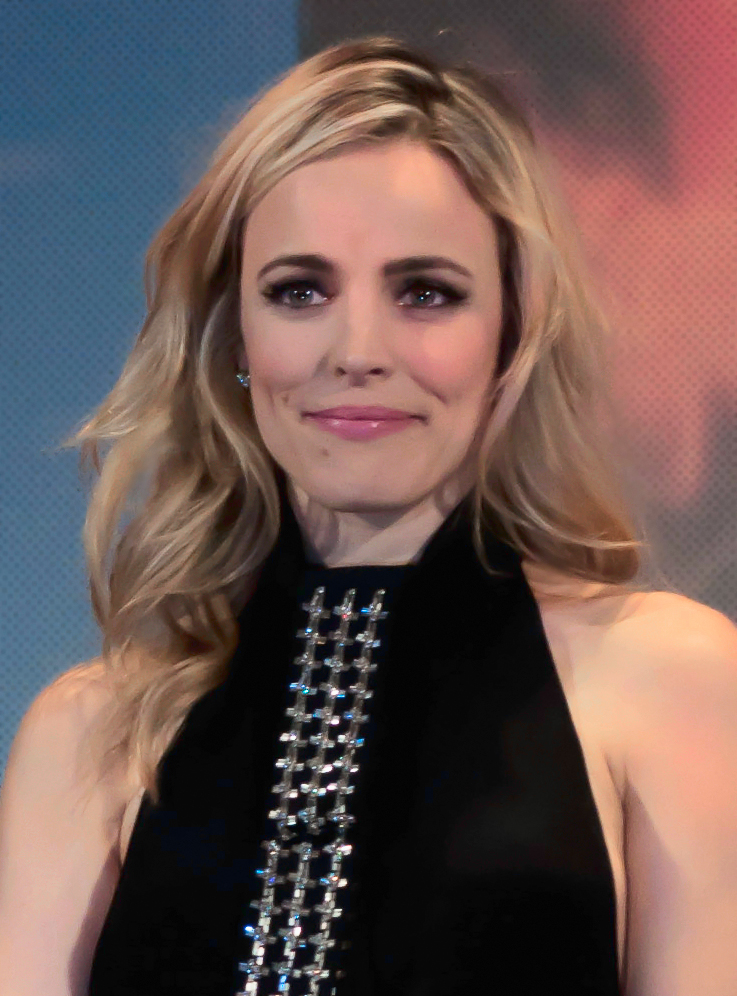
The performances of Ryan Gosling and Rachel McAdams, as well as their on-screen chemistry, were particularly praised by most film critics.

According to review aggregator Rotten Tomatoes, 54% of 182 critics gave the film a positive review, with an average rating of 5.7/10. The website's critics consensus reads, "It's hard not to admire its unabashed sentimentality, but The Notebook is too clumsily manipulative to rise above its melodramatic clichés." Metacritic assigned the film a weighted average score of 53 out of 100, based on 34 critics, indicating "mixed or average reviews". Audiences polled by CinemaScore gave the film an average grade of "A" on an A+ to F scale.

Roger Ebert of the Chicago Sun-Times praised the film, awarding it three-and-a-half stars out of four, calling the photography "striking in its rich, saturated effects" and stating that the "actors are blessed by good material." Peter Lowry of Film Threat gave the film three-and-a-half stars out of five; praising the performances of both Gosling and McAdams, he wrote: "Gosling and especially McAdams give all-star performances, doing just enough to hand the reins over to the pros, who take what's left of the film and finish the audience off with some touching scenes that don't leave a dry eye in the house." About the film itself, he added: "Overall, The Notebook is a surprisingly good film that manages to succeed where many other 'chick flick' like romances fail."

Stephen Holden of The New York Times gave the film a positive review, stating that "the scenes between the young lovers confronting adult authority have the same seething tension and lurking hysteria that the young Warren Beatty and Natalie Wood brought more than 40 years ago to their roles in Splendor in the Grass." Ann Hornaday of The Washington Post also gave the film a positive review, she also praised the performances of Gosling and McAdams, stating: "Never mind that McAdams and Gosling don't for a minute call to mind 1940s America; they're both suitably attractive and appealing. Gosling, who delivered a searing and largely unseen screen debut performance in the 2001 drama The Believer, is particularly convincing as a young man who charms his way past a girl's strongest defenses." About the film, she added: "Audiences craving big, gooey over-the-top romance have their must-see summer movie in The Notebook." William Arnold of the Seattle Post-Intelligencer praised the performance of McAdams but criticized the performance of Gosling, stating that he "just doesn't have the kind of star power or chemistry with McAdams to anchor this kind of minor-league Gone with the Wind." He also added about the film that it "doesn't completely work on its own terms, mainly because its romantic casting just doesn't spark: It doesn't make us fall in love with its lovers." Wesley Morris of The Boston Globe gave the film two-and-a-half stars, praising the performances of its cast members, writing about McAdams that "she's soulfully committed to the suds in the story and fiercely attentive to the other actors". He added about Gosling: "Gosling is adept at playing sociopaths and intense brooders, and there's reason to think, early on, that Noah might be similarly off, as when he threatens to drop from a Ferris wheel unless Allie agrees to go on a date with him." About the film, he wrote: "Considering the sunny, relatively pleasurable romantic business that precedes it, the elderly stuff seems dark, morbid, and forced upon us."

Jessica Winter of The Village Voice gave the film a mixed review, stating: "Amid the sticky-sweet swamp of Jeremy Leven's script, Rowlands and Garner emerge spotless and beatific, lending a magnanimous credibility to their scenes together. These two old pros slice cleanly through the thicket of sap-weeping dialogue and contrivance, locating the terror and desolation wrought by the cruel betrayals of a failing mind." Robert Koehler of Variety also gave the film a mixed review, he however, praised the performances, writing that "already one of the most intriguing young thesps, Gosling extends his range to pure romance without sacrificing a bit of his naturally subversive qualities, and even seems comfortable looking beautiful in a manly American way. The head-turner is McAdams, doing such a different perf from her top bitch in Mean Girls that it's hard to tell it's the same actor. She skillfully carries much of the film's emotional weight with a free and easy manner."

In June 2010, Entertainment Weekly included Allie and Noah in its list of the "100 Greatest Characters of the Last 20 Years." The periodical listed The Notebook in their 25 Sexiest Movies Ever. Us Weekly included the film in its list of the 30 Most Romantic Movies of All Time. Boston.com ranked the film the third Top Romantic Movie. The Notebook appeared on Moviefone's list of the 25 Best Romance Movies of All Time. Marie Claire also put the film on its list of the 12 Most Romantic Movie Scenes of All Time. In 2011, The Notebook was named the best chick-flick during ABC News and People's television special Best in Film: The Greatest Movies of Our Time. The scene where Noah climbs the Ferris Wheel because he wants a date with Allie made the list of Total Film's 50 Most Romantic Movie Moments of All Time. The kiss in the rain was ranked No. 4 in Total Film's 50 Best Movie Kisses list. In 2025, it was one of the films voted for the "Readers' Choice" edition of The New York Times' list of "The 100 Best Movies of the 21st Century," finishing at number 296.

== Awards and nominations ==
Year	Award	Category	Recipients	Result
2004	Golden Trailer Awards	Best Romance		Nominated
2004	Teen Choice Awards	Choice Movie of the Summer		Nominated
2004	Teen Choice Awards	Choice Breakout Movie Actress	Rachel McAdams	Nominated
2005	Artios Awards	Outstanding Achievement in Casting – Feature Film, Drama	Matthew Barry and Nancy Green-Keyes	Nominated
2005	Golden Satellite Awards	Best Supporting Actress – Motion Picture	Gena Rowlands	Won
2005	MTV Movie Awards	Best Female Performance	Rachel McAdams	Nominated
2005	MTV Movie Awards	Best Kiss	Rachel McAdams and Ryan Gosling	Won
2005	Screen Actors Guild Awards	Outstanding Performance by a Male Actor in a Supporting Role	James Garner	Nominated
2005	Teen Choice Awards	Choice Movie Drama		Won
2005	Teen Choice Awards	Choice Date Movie		Won
2005	Teen Choice Awards	Choice Movie Actor – Drama	Ryan Gosling	Won
2005	Teen Choice Awards	Choice Movie Actress – Drama	Rachel McAdams	Won
2005	Teen Choice Awards	Choice Movie Breakout Performance – Male	Ryan Gosling	Won
2005	Teen Choice Awards	Choice Movie Chemistry	Rachel McAdams and Ryan Gosling	Won
2005	Teen Choice Awards	Choice Movie Liplock	Rachel McAdams and Ryan Gosling	Won
2005	Teen Choice Awards	Choice Movie Love Scene	Rachel McAdams and Ryan Gosling	Won

== Home media ==
The Notebook was released on VHS and DVD on February 8, 2005, and Blu-ray on May 4, 2010. By February 2010, the film had sold over 11 million copies on DVD.

In February 2019, subscribers to the UK version of Netflix reported that the version of the film on the streaming service had an alternate ending, which substituted a more light-hearted conclusion than the emotional end of the original release. Netflix responded that this alternate version of the film had been supplied to them in error, and soon replaced it with the original version.

== Television series ==
On August 11, 2015, it was reported that a television series was in development by The CW. The series was to follow Noah and Allie's courtship following the events of the film, and in a post-WWII world. In 2024, it was revealed by the director that the TV show has been cancelled.

== Stage musical ==
On January 3, 2019, Ingrid Michaelson announced she would be writing the music and lyrics for a musical adaption of The Notebook with a book by Bekah Brunstetter. Sparks will also be involved as a producer alongside Kevin McCollum and Kurt Deutsch.

The production was initially slated for fall 2020 but was delayed by the COVID-19 pandemic. Michaelson and Brunstetter used the additional time to hold online previews and tweak their work.

The musical opened on September 6, 2022, at the Chicago Shakespeare Theatre and received generally positive reviews. Stephen Oxman of the Chicago Sun-Times said, "I simply was not expecting to fall in love with 'The Notebook,'... But I have." Adding, "It’s a significant leap in artistic quality over its sources, which it respects, while also providing a clear, resonant, and unique voice of its own." Jonathan Abarbanel of Theater Mania noted what while the musical used the novel for its basis rather than the film, he noted that Michaelson and Brunstetter shifted the time period twenty years to begin in the late 1960s causing Noah to leave for the Vietnam War rather than World War II. The production closed on October 30, 2022.

In August 2023, it was announced that the show would open on Broadway in the spring of 2024 at the Gerald Schoenfeld Theatre. The show opened on March 14, with a cast that included Maryann Plunkett as Older Allie, Dorian Harewood as Older Noah, Joy Woods as Middle Allie, Ryan Vasquez as Middle Noah, Jordan Tyson as Younger Allie, and John Cardoza as Younger Noah.
