= Spanish Mount Point =

Archaeological site in South Carolina, United States

- U.S. National Register of Historic Places
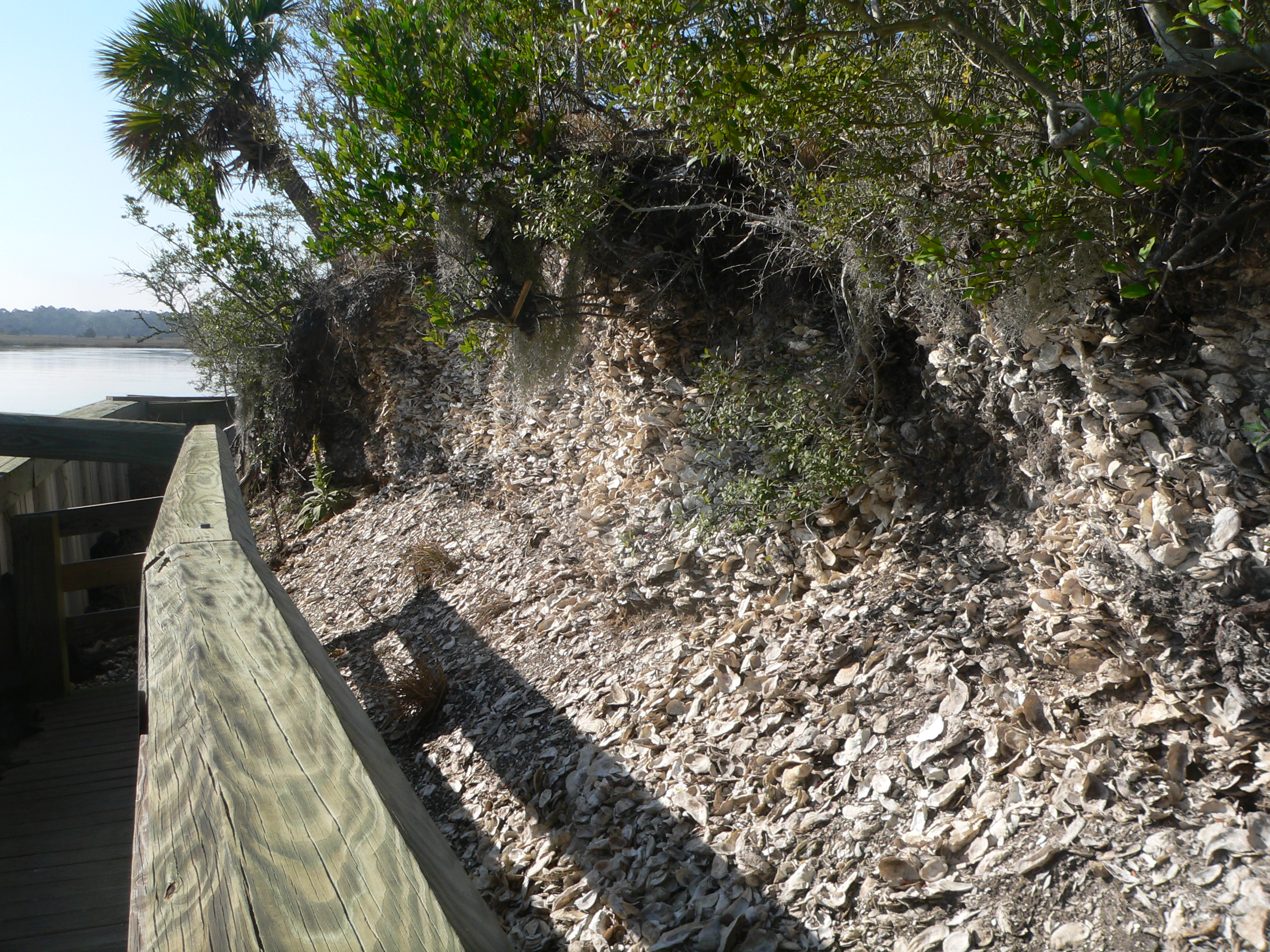
- Spanish Mount Point, January 2013

- Location within South Carolina Location within the United States
- Location: Edisto Beach State Park, Edisto Island, South Carolina
- Coordinates: 32°29′57″N 80°19′13″W
- Area: 0.5 acres (0.20 ha)
- NRHP reference No.: 74001836
- Added to NRHP: August 30, 1974

Spanish Mount Point is a historic archaeological site located at Edisto Beach State Park, Edisto Island, Colleton County, South Carolina. Spanish Mount is an oyster-clam shell midden, about 27 meters long and 3 meters high. The site is bordered by water and marsh on three sides. Spanish Mount dates between 2200 and 1800 BC and represents a transitional period of pre-history and the midden accumulated during the site's short term occupation.

It was listed in the National Register of Historic Places in 1974.
