= Edward Petty =

South Carolina politician

Edward Petty was a state legislator in South Carolina. He served in the South Carolina House of Representatives from 1872 to 1874. He lived in Charleston County, South Carolina.

He corresponded about ordinance.

He was one of the incorporators of the Toglio Ferry Company. It served areas around Charleston including Edisto Island.
