= Hephzibah Jenkins Townsend's Tabby Oven Ruins =

Archaeological site in South Carolina, United States

- U.S. National Register of Historic Places
- Location: Address Restricted, Edisto Island, South Carolina
- Area: 0.4 acres (0.16 ha)
- Built: c. 1815
- MPS: Edisto Island MRA
- NRHP reference No.: 86003200
- Added to NRHP: May 5, 1987

Hephzibah Jenkins Townsend's Tabby Oven Ruins is a historic archaeological site located at Edisto Island, Charleston County, South Carolina. The remains represent what was essentially a commercial bakery.

The tabby ovens were built about 1815; tabby is a type of concrete. The site consists of in situ tabby walls and foundations, as well as portions of fallen walls and tabby rubble.

The oven's products were sold at Charleston by Hephzibah Jenkins Townsend of Bleak Hall Plantation to support the mission work of Edisto Island Baptist Church.

It was listed on the National Register of Historic Places in 1987.
