= Lucia Murchison =

American social worker

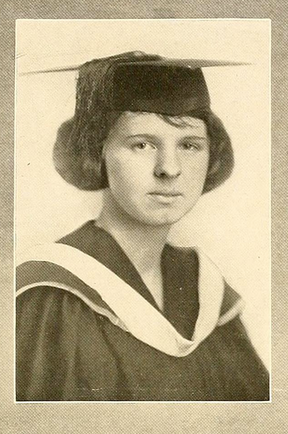
- Lucia Murchison, from the 1922 yearbook of Agnes Scott College
- Born: Lucia Landrum Murchison; December 18, 1900; Edisto Island, South Carolina
- Died: January 31, 1983 (aged 82); Lexington, South Carolina
- Occupation(s): Medical social worker, clubwoman

Lucia Landrum Murchison (December 18, 1900 – January 31, 1983) was an American social worker and clubwoman. She was president of the South Carolina Public Health Association in 1965, and there is an annual Lucia Murchison Public Health Social Work Conference named in her memory.

== Early life and education ==
Murchison was born on Edisto Island, and raised in Lee County, South Carolina, the daughter of Hugh Roderick Murchison and Lucia Landrum Murchison. Her father was a Presbyterian minister and chaplain of the University of South Carolina. She graduated from Agnes Scott College in 1922, and earned a master's degree in social service at Johns Hopkins University. Her graduate thesis was a study of policies concerning juvenile gonorrhea patients in Baltimore.

== Career ==
Murchison was a social worker at the Children's Hospital in Washington, D.C., and a member of the Child Welfare Committee of the Council of Social Agencies in the District of Columbia in the 1930s. In 1937 and 1938, representing the Association of the Junior Leagues of America, she served on the planning committee of a conference on Better Care for Mothers and Babies, held in Washington, D.C. In 1931, she addressed the Washington chapter of the National Association of Social Workers, saying "the medical social worker sees the patient not merely as an isolated unfortunate person occupying a hospital bed but as a member belonging to a family or community group that is altered because of sickness."

Murchison was active in Altrusa, and president of the Columbia, South Carolina, chapter in the mid-1940s. She was an officer of the Columbia Hearing Society in the 1950s. She was president of the South Carolina Public Health Association in 1965. She was a South Carolina delegate to two White House Conferences on Children and Youth, in 1950 and 1960.

== Honors ==
In 1955, Murchison received an Award of Merit from the South Carolina Mental Health Association. In 1966, she was honored by the National Association of Social Workers for her career in the field. In 1973, she was honored with the James A. Hayne Award from the South Carolina Public Health Association.

== Publications ==
- "Care of Premature Babies in South Carolina: Staff Education Conferences for Public Health Nurses" (1946, with Hettie Hough)

== Personal life and legacy ==
Murchison died in 1983, at the age of 82, in Lexington, South Carolina. There is an annual Lucia Murchison Public Health Social Work Conference named in her memory.
