= Session (Presbyterianism) =

Governing body of a Presbyterian or Reformed church

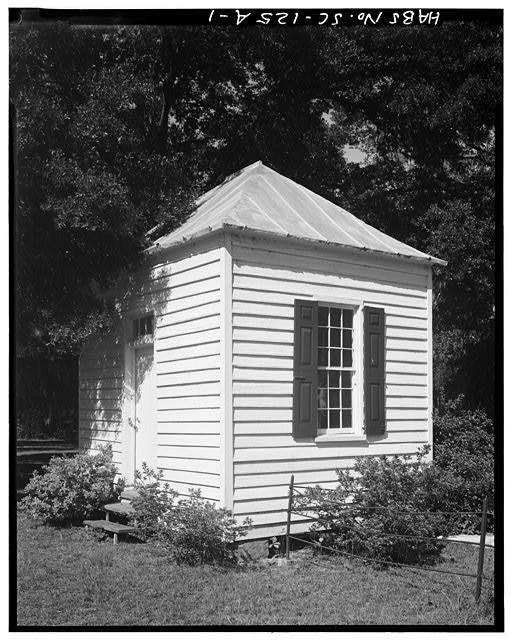
The "Session House" of the Edisto Island Presbyterian Church was used by the Session and for small meetings.

A session (from the Latin word sessio, which means "to sit", as in sitting to deliberate or talk about something; sometimes called consistory or church board) is a body of elected elders governing a particular church within presbyterian polity.

== Organization ==
These groups of elders make decisions for the local parish through a ruling body called the Kirk session (Latin. sessio from sedere "to sit"), sometimes the Session, church session, or (in Continental Reformed usage) consistory. The members of the session are the pastor (Teaching Elder) of that congregation, and the other ruling elders (sometimes called "lay elders"). Elders are ordained for life, so if they are subsequently elected or appointed to Sessions at later points in their lives, they are inducted, there being no second ordination. In most denominations, the pastor serves as Moderator of the Session and thus convenes or presides over the session. All elders have an equal vote in the session.

In some denominations, the pastor is given no vote. However, in a sitting body of an even number or with a quorum of the session counted, the pastor can break a tie with a casting vote. In the Polity of the Presbyterian Church (USA) and the Evangelical Presbyterian Church (United States), the pastor and associate pastor have a vote as members of the session on any matters. However, the pastor will often refrain from voting except in tie situations. The Pastor is not a voting member of the congregation.

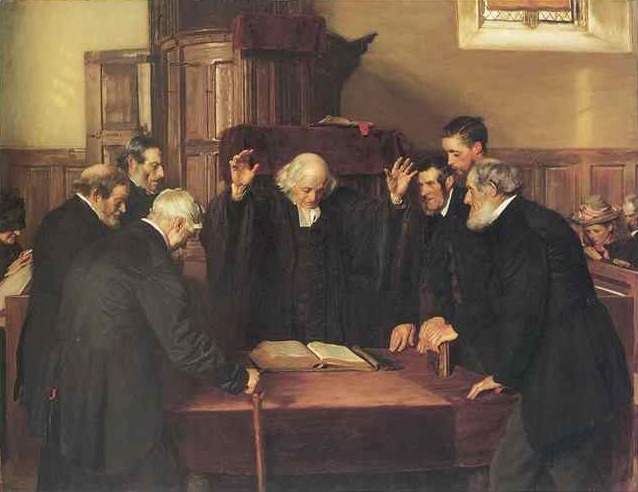
The Ordination of Elders in a Scottish Kirk, by John Henry Lorimer, 1891. National Gallery of Scotland.

The elders who are members of Session have both executive powers as a group and pastoral responsibility. Many elders will be in regular pastoral contact with a group of the members of the congregation and their families. In the pastoral function, elders rarely bring issues to Session meetings, resolving them privately or with the aid of the minister or other counsellor.

In executive function a number of Sessions have complete authority (under presbytery) for the ordering of all business, spiritual and temporal, of their congregation. This condition is known in the Church of Scotland as "quoad omnia". Other congregations have a separate "congregational board", "deacons' court" or "management committee" which deals with financial details and the maintenance of the property. The financial board thus relieves the Session of much routine responsibility but remains under the direction of the Session.

The Kirk Session remains the first court of the Presbyterian Church. It is under the jurisdiction of the presbytery of the bounds to which they commission the minister and at least one ruling elder. The minister is a member of the presbytery rather than the congregation and is, therefore, under the spiritual oversight of the presbytery. The members of the congregation, including the ruling elders, are under the spiritual oversight of the Kirk Session.

This is a practical manifestation of the Protestant doctrine of the priesthood of all believers, and as all elders are ordained, some to rule and others to teach, the Moderator of the Kirk Session sits as a chairman of the elders primus inter pares.

== Clerk of Session ==
The person who takes minutes for the Session and maintains all of the church's ledgers of membership, births, baptisms, deaths, and elders is known as the Clerk of Session. However, the role takes on a special significance well beyond its stated duties. In leadership and influence across the congregation, the Session Clerk is a partner with the Minister and often speaks for the Congregation and Elders in offering words of guidance and encouragement to the Minister as well as being the key to marshalling resources and support to implement the Minister's projects.

== See also ==
- Genevan Consistory
