= Marsh Hen Mill =

Grits mill

Coordinates: 32°35′42″N 80°20′50″W

Marsh Hen Mill is a company on Edisto Island, in the US state of South Carolina, best known for its traditionally manufactured heirloom grits.

== History ==
The company is owned by Betsy and Greg Johnsman, who in 2003 took over Betsy's family's farm on Edisto Island, a farm they had owned for three generations, and began growing and selling tomatoes and other fruits and vegetables. In 2007, they bought a 1945 gristmill, which had been sitting idle in a barn since the 1960s and which Greg brought back to working condition. They kept the farm's old name "Geechie Boy", which was the nickname of a white farmer on the island, Raymond Tumbleston. That name, however, caused some backlash and accusations of cultural appropriation, particularly after the George Floyd protests in 2020: in the South Carolina Lowcountry, "Geechee" is another name for the Gullah people, who are "descended from enslaved Africans who settled in tight-knit communities along the coast of the Carolinas and into Florida." By September 2020, "after many days of prayer and countless bowls of grits", the owners rebranded as "Marsh Hen Mill", named for the Salt water marsh hen which inhabits the Southern US coast.

== Products ==
Marsh Hen Mill sells grits milled from heirloom grains (including a pink variety called "Unicorn" made from red corn) to restaurants in Charleston and Atlanta, and ships across the country. Their products are used by many notable chefs, including those working in traditional soul food cuisine.

The company sells Carolina Gold, a Lowcountry variety of African rice; at the time of the American Civil War it made up 3.5 million of the 5 million bushels of rice produced in the US, but had not been commercially grown since 1927 until its revival in South Carolina in the 1980s. They also sell heirloom vegetables including cauliflower and sweet onions, besides other locally made products.

== See also ==
- List of name changes due to the George Floyd protests
