= Prospect Hill (Charleston County, South Carolina) =

Historic house in South Carolina, United States

- U.S. National Register of Historic Places
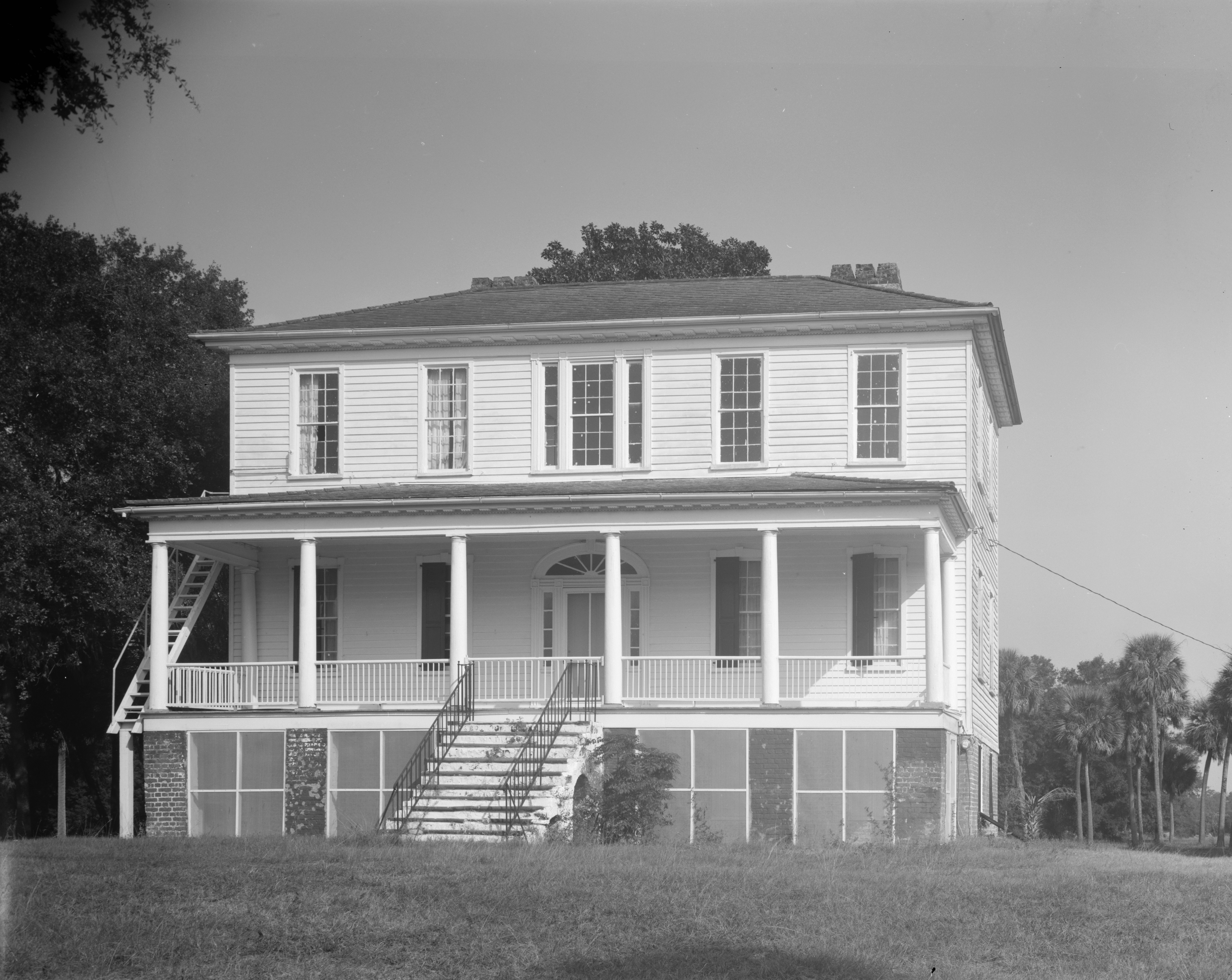
- South (front) facade, October 1978

- Location within South Carolina Location within the United States
- Location: 2695 Laurel Hill Road, Edisto Island, SC 29438
- Coordinates: 32°34′54″N 80°23′04″W
- Built: c. 1792
- Architectural style: Greek Revival
- NRHP reference No.: 86003196
- Added to NRHP: Nov. 28, 1986

Prospect Hill is an historic plantation house on Edisto Island, South Carolina. The two-story Federal house is significant for its architecture and ties to the production of sea island cotton. Constructed about 1800 for Ephraim Baynard, it sits on a bluff overlooking the South Edisto River. In 1860, William Grimball Baynard owned Prospect Hill. Baynard was an elder in the Edisto Island Presbyterian Church, a Justice of the Peace, a Justice of the Quorum, and the owner of 220 slaves. When Baynard died in 1861, his son William G. Baynard acquired the house. The house was listed in the National Register of Historic Places on 28 November 1986.

In 1999, Prospect Hill was bought by the Nature Conservancy of South Carolina for $5.75 million with plans to conserve the 1200 acres along the South Edisto River. The prior owner was a real estate development company which had intended to develop the property. The house was then resold to private homeowners who restored it.
