= General Asbestos and Rubber Company Main Mill =

- General Asbestos and Rubber Company (GARCO) Main Mill
- U.S. National Register of Historic Places
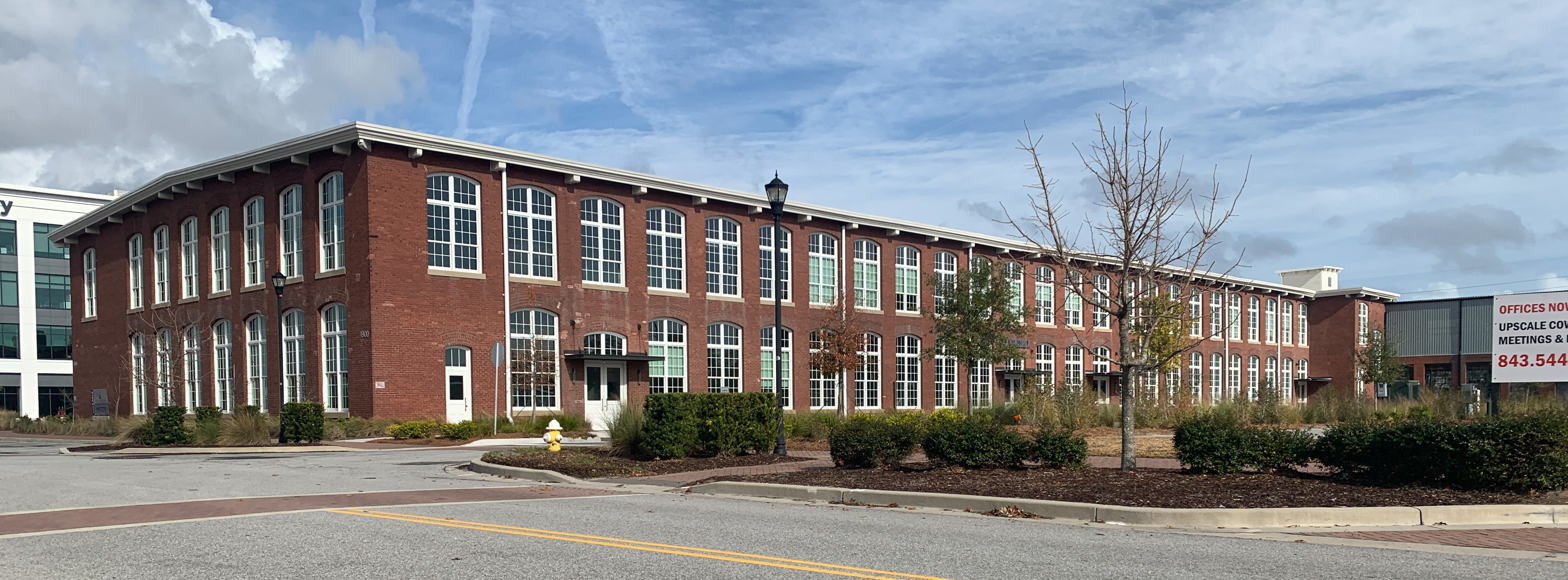

- Location within South Carolina Location within the United States
- Location: 0 O'Hear Ave., North Charleston, South Carolina
- Coordinates: 32°53′1″N 79°58′30″W
- Built: 1915
- NRHP reference No.: 100000687
- Added to NRHP: February 28, 2017

The General Asbestos and Rubber Company (GARCO) Main Mill (also known as simply GARCO) is a historic industrial facility located in Park Circle in North Charleston, South Carolina. GARCO was a major regional employer, supplying products to the American space program, including the soles of the spacesuit boots used in the first Moon landing. The main mill building was built in 1915, and also provided materials to the military efforts in both world wars.

When the plant was built, the company also built 20 bungalows of various designs to house some of the white workers; black workers were housed elsewhere at the edge of North Charleston. The mill was listed on the National Register of Historic Places in 2017. The structure is currently being renovated. When completed, the restored GARCO will house stores, housing, and restaurants.

== See also ==
- National Register of Historic Places listings in Charleston County, South Carolina
