= Edisto Beach State Park =

State park in South Carolina, United States

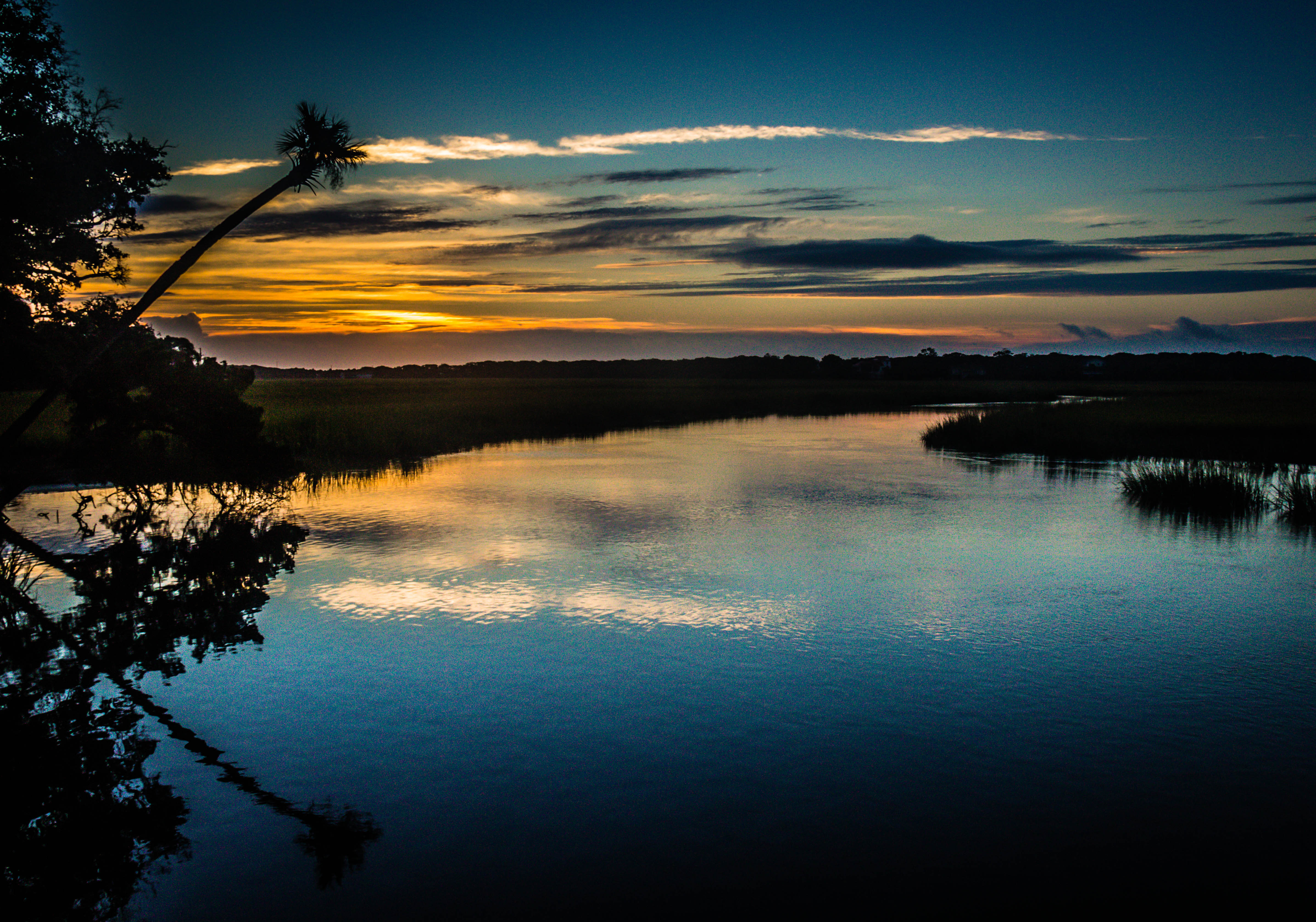
- Sunrise at Edisto Beach State Park, September 2012

- Location within South Carolina
- Location: 8377 State Cabin Rd, Edisto Island, South Carolina, U.S.
- Nearest city: Edisto Beach, SC
- Coordinates: 32°30′46″N 80°18′00″W
- Area: 1,255 acres (5.1 km^{2})
- Created: 1935
- Operator: South Carolina State Park Service
- Visitors: ~300,000 per year
- Open: All year
- Camp sites: Tent and RV campsites, 110 with water and electrical hookups, 5 Rustic tent sites, 7 cabins(5- One bedroom, 2- three bedroom)
- Hiking trails: 6
- Other information: Boating, fishing, and hiking.

Edisto Beach State Park is located on the coast of South Carolina, 50 miles (80 km) south of Charleston, near the town of Edisto Beach in Colleton County.

The park offers South Carolina's longest system of handicapped-accessible hiking and biking trails. The trails wind through Edisto Island's maritime forest, leading to sites such as a Native American shell midden dated to 2000 BC, and a survey monument placed by Alexander Bache in 1850.

Activities possible at the park include surf fishing for flounder, spottail and whiting, as well as boating, birding, and picnicking.

The park's education center, the Edisto Interpretive Center, hosts a number of programs and research services. The center includes an exhibit teaching visitors about the ACE Basin estuarine reserve through interactive displays.

== History ==
The park was one of the first South Carolina state parks, developed by the Civilian Conservation Corps. It was created on land donated in 1935 by the Edisto Company. Many of the original buildings built by the CCC still stand and are in use currently.
