= Alexander Bache U.S. Coast Survey Line =

- U.S. National Register of Historic Places
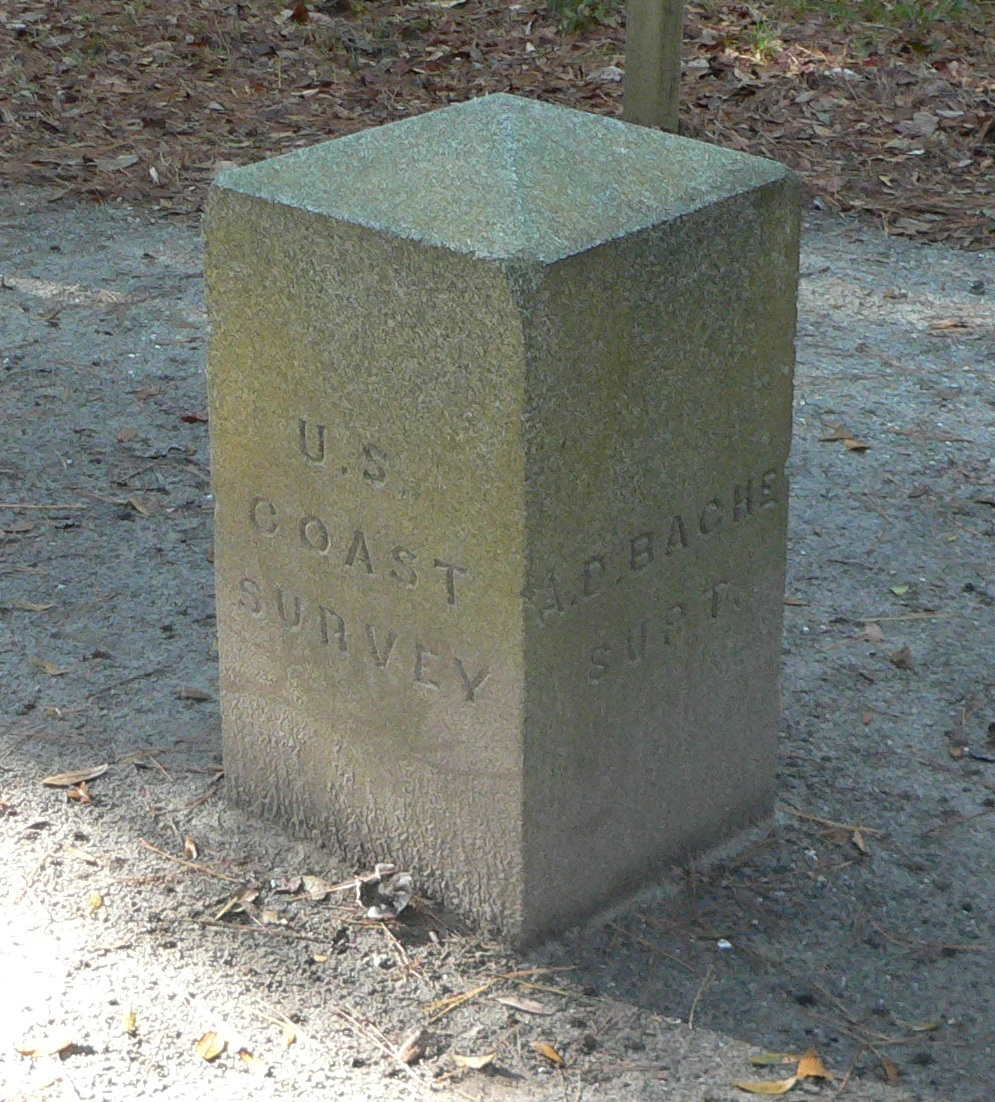
- Alexander Bache Survey Line Marker, January 2013

- Location within South Carolina Location within the United States
- Location: 8377 State Cabin Rd., Edisto Island, South Carolina
- Coordinates: 32°30′20″N 80°18′37″W
- Area: less than one acre
- Built: 1850
- NRHP reference No.: 07001082
- Added to NRHP: October 5, 2007

Alexander Bache U.S. Coast Survey Line is a historic geodetic survey line located at Edisto Island, Charleston County, South Carolina. This base line was surveyed by Alexander Dallas Bache and his assistants during January 1850 as part of their work with the United States Coast Survey. They buried granite blocks at each endpoint and then placed a granite monument on top of each block.

It was listed on the National Register of Historic Places in 2007.
