= Bailey's Store =

- U.S. National Register of Historic Places
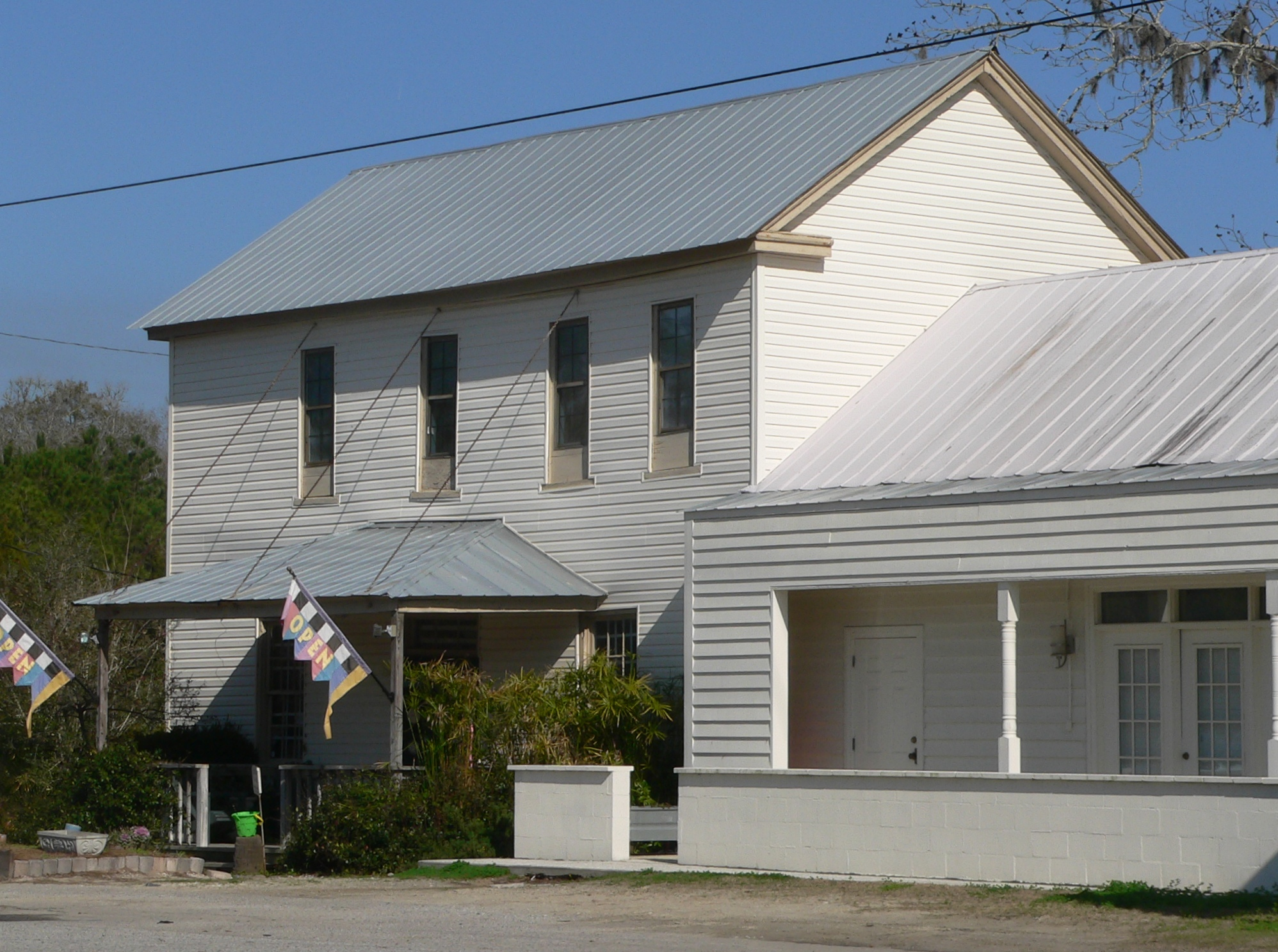
- With These Hands Gallery, occupying Bailey's Store; 2013 photo

- Location within South Carolina Location within the United States
- Location: 1442 Highway 174, Edisto Island, South Carolina
- Coordinates: 32°33′36.32″N 80°16′46.6″W
- Built: 1820
- NRHP reference No.: 86003204
- Added to NRHP: Nov. 28, 1986

Bailey's Store is one of the last nineteenth century commercial structures on Edisto Island, Charleston County, South Carolina. Bailey's Store was likely built earlier than 1825 on Edingsville Beach, a popular seaside resort, before it was moved to its present location about 1870 following the abandonment of Edingsville Beach. Because all of the remaining structures at Edingsville Beach were swept into the Atlantic Ocean in the hurricane of 1893, Bailey's Store is the only survivor of that community. The building was taken apart and reassembled at Stone Creek for use as a gin house. The building was listed in the National Register November 28, 1986.

Bailey's Store is a two-story building with weatherboard cladding and side gables. When Highway 174 was moved in about 1940, Bailey's Store was turned 180 degrees. The Edisto Island Post Office was located at Bailey's Store for many years in an addition on the south side. The addition has since been removed. A hipped roof runs above the front door from the western elevation. The three windows on the first floor and five on the second are asymmetrically placed. There is a one-story, hipped roof addition on the back of the building. Additionally, the interior of the house was substantially renovated in the 1980s.
