= Frogmore (Edisto Island, South Carolina) =

Historic house in South Carolina, United States

- U.S. National Register of Historic Places
- Location within South Carolina Location within the United States
- Location: 8341 Pine Landing Road, Edisto Island, SC 29438
- Coordinates: 32°35′16″N 80°21′21″W
- Area: 43.95 acres (17.79 ha)
- Built: 1820
- Architectural style: Greek Revival
- NRHP reference No.: 86003203
- Added to NRHP: May 5, 1987

Frogmore is a plantation house on Edisto Island, South Carolina, built by Waccamaw's Dr. Edward Mitchell in approximately 1820 following his marriage to Edisto Island's Elizabeth Baynard.

Frogmore, a rectangular, two-story, hip-roofed house, has a distinctive cotton plantation on an antebellum sea island. Mitchell ran a large plantation with more than 100 slaves in 1840.

When Edisto Island was occupied by the Federal union from 1862 onward, Colonel Moore of the 55th Pennsylvania Infantry used Frogmore as his headquarters.

On May 5, 1987, Frogmore was added to the United States National Register of Historic Places.
