= Wescott Road =

- U.S. National Register of Historic Places
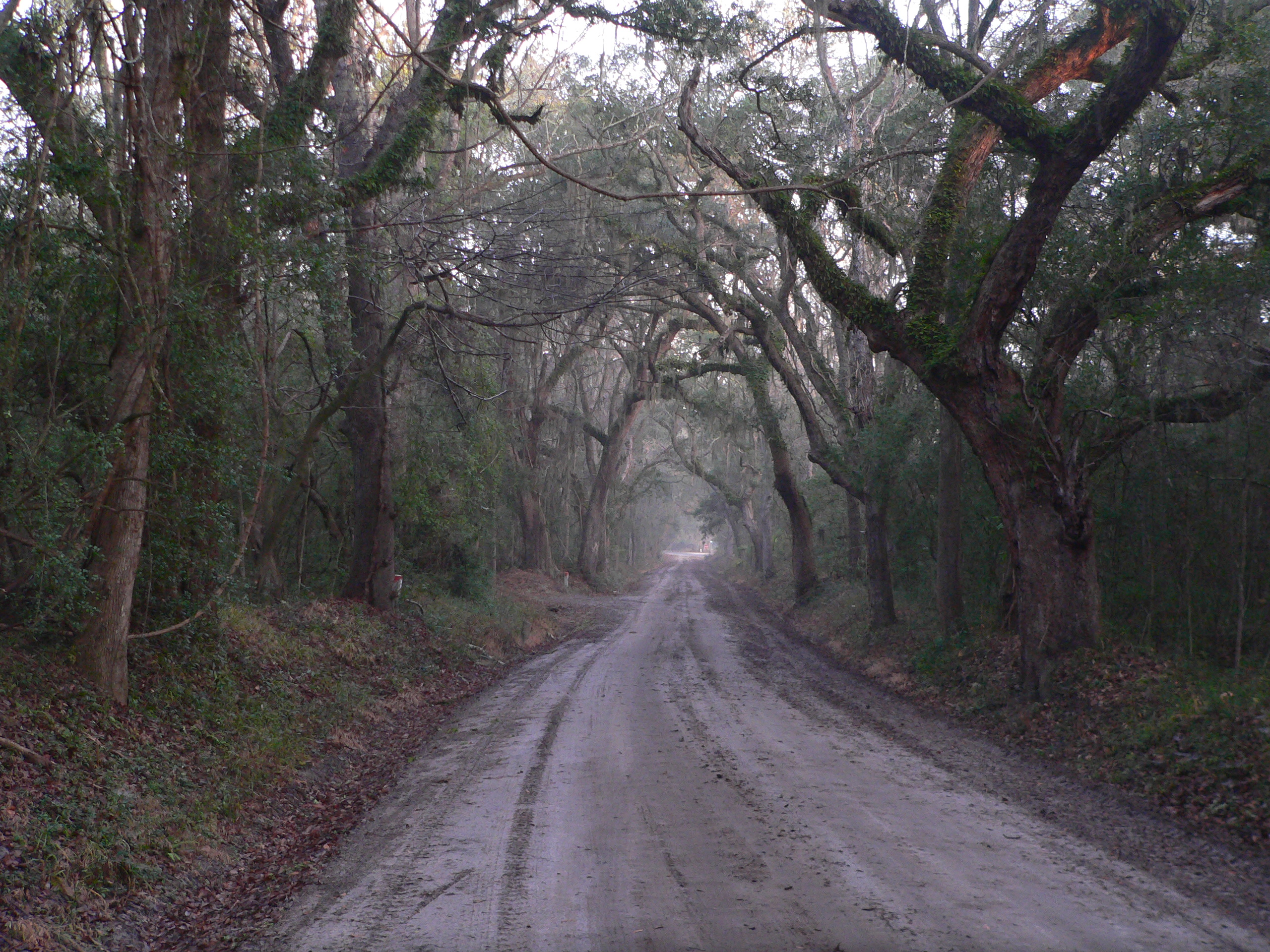
- Wescott Road, January 2013

- Location within South Carolina Location within the United States
- Location: West of South Carolina Highway 174, Edisto Island, South Carolina
- Coordinates: 32°33′44″N 80°16′53″W
- Area: 1.9 acres (0.77 ha)
- Built: 1825
- MPS: Edisto Island MRA
- NRHP reference No.: 86003195
- Added to NRHP: November 28, 1986

Wescott Road, also known as Westcoat Road, is a historic road located at Edisto Island, Charleston County, South Carolina. It represents the last undisturbed remnants of the main road on Edisto Island, and is an oak-lined dirt road approximately 2/5 mile in distance. The road was established in the Colonial era. This section was isolated when S.C. Highway 174 was straightened and paved about 1940.

It was listed on the National Register of Historic Places in 1986.
