= Trinity Church (Edisto Island, South Carolina) =

Historic church in South Carolina, United States

- U.S. National Register of Historic Places
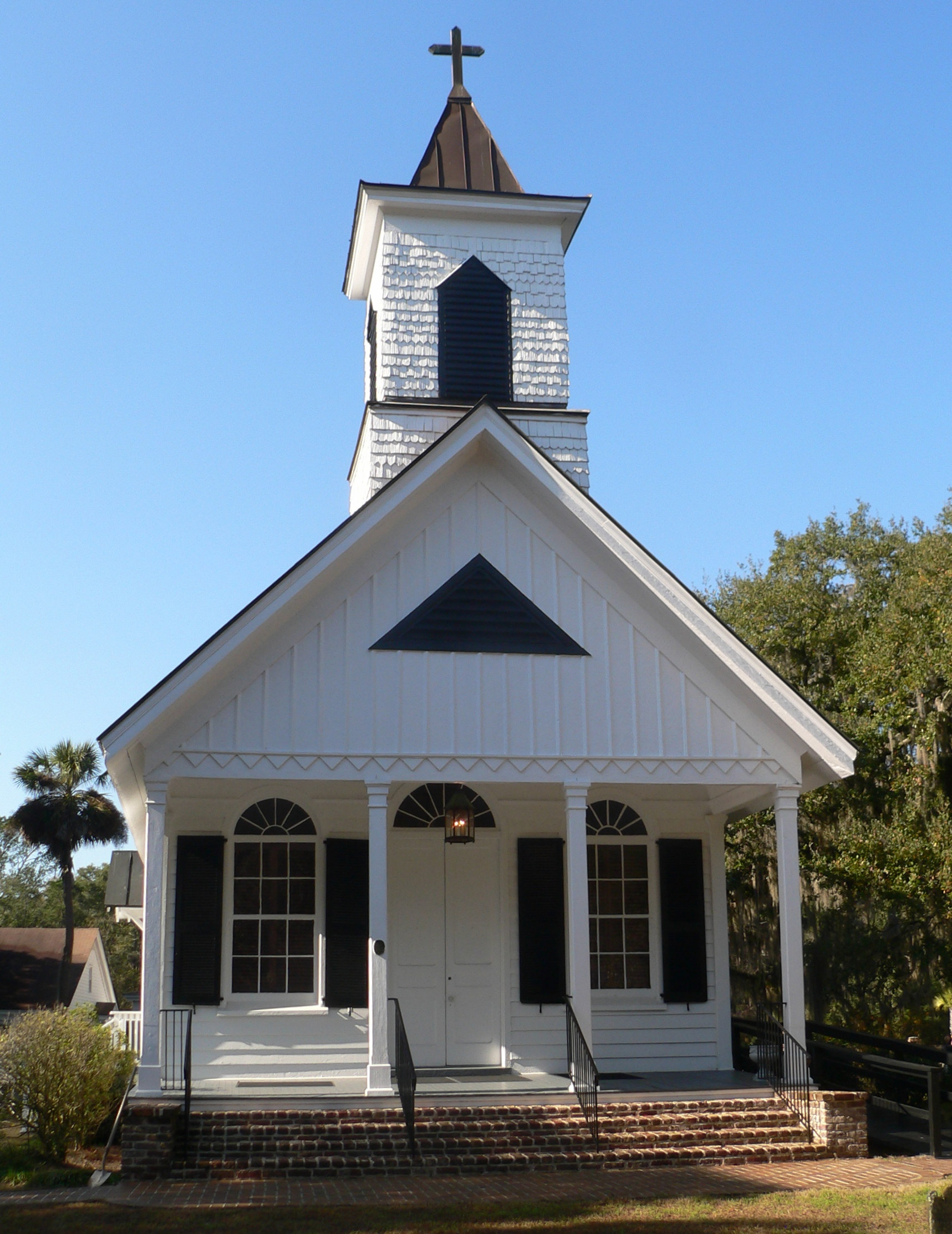

- Location within South Carolina Location within the United States
- Nearest city: Edisto Island, South Carolina
- Coordinates: 32°34′10.16″N 80°17′1″W
- Area: 2 acres (0.81 ha)
- Built: 1876
- Architectural style: Late Victorian
- NRHP reference No.: 71000759
- Added to NRHP: May 14, 1971

Trinity Church is a church on Edisto Island, South Carolina.

It was built in 1876 and added to the National Register of Historic Places in 1971.
