= Oak Island (South Carolina) =

Historic house in South Carolina, United States

- U.S. National Register of Historic Places
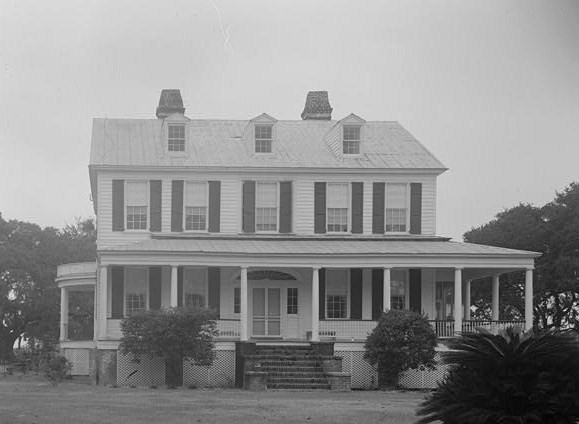
- Oak Island, HABS Photo, 1977-1979

- Location within South Carolina Location within the United States
- Location: 1 mi. off Oak Island Rd. on Westbank Creek, Edisto Island, South Carolina
- Coordinates: 32°35′39″N 80°15′5″W
- Area: 8.4 acres (3.4 ha)
- Built: c. 1828-1831
- MPS: Edisto Island MRA
- NRHP reference No.: 86003202
- Added to NRHP: November 28, 1986

Oak Island, also known as the William Seabrook, Jr. House, is a historic plantation house located at Edisto Island, Charleston County, South Carolina. It was built about 1828–1831, and is a 2 1/2-story, five-bay, rectangular, central-hall, frame, weatherboard-clad residence with a projecting two-story rear pavilion. It features two, massive, interior chimneys with heavily corbelled caps and a one-story, wraparound hipped roof porch.

It was listed on the National Register of Historic Places in 1986.
