= Seaside School =

- U.S. National Register of Historic Places
- Location within South Carolina Location within the United States
- Location: 1097 SC 174, Edisto Island, South Carolina
- Coordinates: 32°32′51″N 80°16′54″W
- Area: 1 acre (0.40 ha)
- Built: c. 1931
- NRHP reference No.: 94000602
- Added to NRHP: June 17, 1994

Seaside School, also known as Seaside Colored School, is a historic school building for African-American children located at Edisto Island, Charleston County, South Carolina. It was built about 1931, and is a one-story, two-room, rectangular frame building. It sits on a low brick pier foundation and has weatherboard exterior siding. The school has been vacant since 1954, except for brief periods of residential tenant occupancy. It is one of only three remaining historic schools on Edisto Island.

It was listed on the National Register of Historic Places in 1994.
