= Middleton's Plantation =

Historic house in South Carolina, United States

- U.S. National Register of Historic Places
- Location within South Carolina Location within the United States
- Location: 3.5 miles north of Edisto Island off South Carolina Highway 174, near Edisto Island, South Carolina
- Coordinates: 32°33′25″N 80°19′48″W
- Area: 6.4 acres (2.6 ha)
- Built: c. 1830
- NRHP reference No.: 71000755
- Added to NRHP: May 6, 1971

Middleton's Plantation, also known as Chisolm's Plantation and The Launch, is a historic plantation house located near Edisto Island, Charleston County, South Carolina. It was built about 1830, and is a two-story wooden house, with one-room wings. It sits on a raised arcaded brick basement. It features a small Tuscan order colonnaded porch on the land side facade and a recessed, full width, Tuscan order colonnaded porch on the water side. It was the home of Oliver Hering Middleton, son of Governor Henry Middleton of Middleton Place.

It was listed on the National Register of Historic Places in 1971.
