= Seaside Plantation House =

Historic house in South Carolina, United States

- U.S. National Register of Historic Places
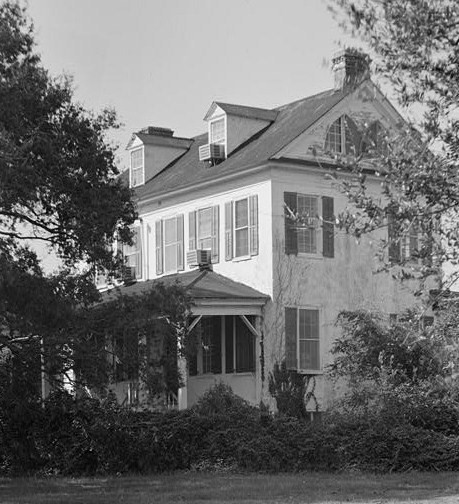
- Seaside, HABS Photo, 1977-1979

- Location within South Carolina Location within the United States
- Location: Off South Carolina Highway 174, Edisto Island, South Carolina
- Coordinates: 32°31′14″N 80°17′23″W
- Area: 2.3 acres (0.93 ha)
- Built: c. 1810
- Architectural style: Federal
- NRHP reference No.: 82003840
- Added to NRHP: January 21, 1982

Seaside Plantation House, also known as Locksley Hall, is a historic plantation house located at Edisto Island, Colleton County, South Carolina. It was built about 1810, and is a 2 1/2-story, Federal style brick dwelling with a gable roof. The house is one room deep with a long porch across the southeast elevation and sits on a raised basement. The central portion of the house is stuccoed brick with frame additions on the first floor.

It was listed in the National Register of Historic Places in 1982.
