= Crawford's Plantation House =

Historic house in South Carolina, United States

- U.S. National Register of Historic Places
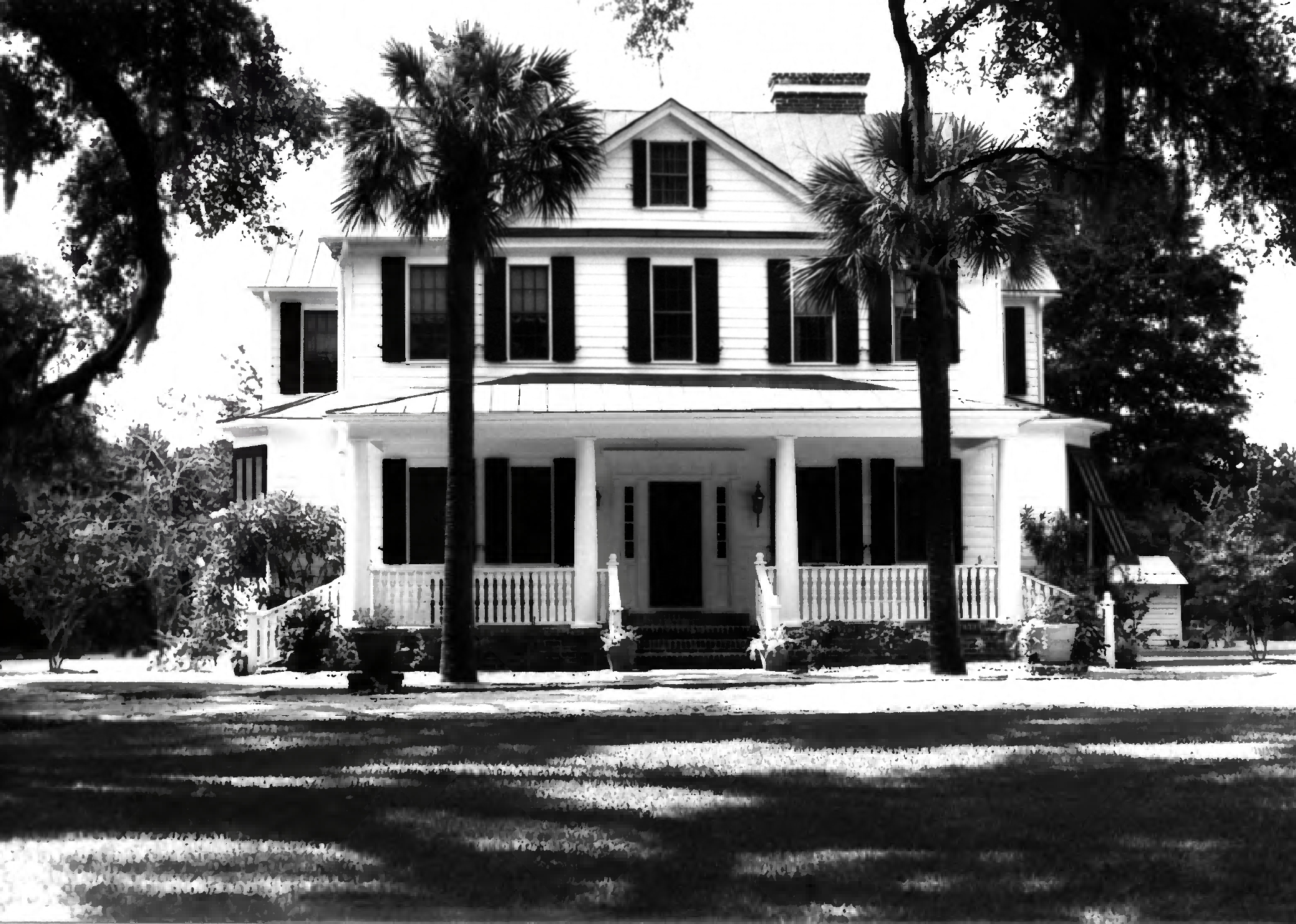
- Crawford's Plantation House in 1992.

- Location within South Carolina Location within the United States
- Location: 8202 Oyster Factory Road, Edisto Island, SC 29438
- Coordinates: 32°32′16″N 80°18′14″W
- Area: 209.7 acres (84.9 ha)
- Built: 1835-1840
- Architectural style: Greek Revival
- NRHP reference No.: 93000475
- Added to NRHP: June 8, 1993

Crawford's Plantation House is a plantation house on Edisto Island, South Carolina of architectural significance. The building reflects an antebellum Greek Revival Sea Island cotton plantation. Between 1889 and 1899, one-story polygonal projections at the front were added. An earlier porch was replaced in the twentieth century, and the back porch has been enclosed. The plantation was listed in the National Register on June 8, 1993.

== See also ==
- Plantation complexes in the Southern United States
