= Botany Bay Plantation Wildlife Management Area =

Botany Bay Heritage Preserve
- IUCN category V (protected landscape/seascape)
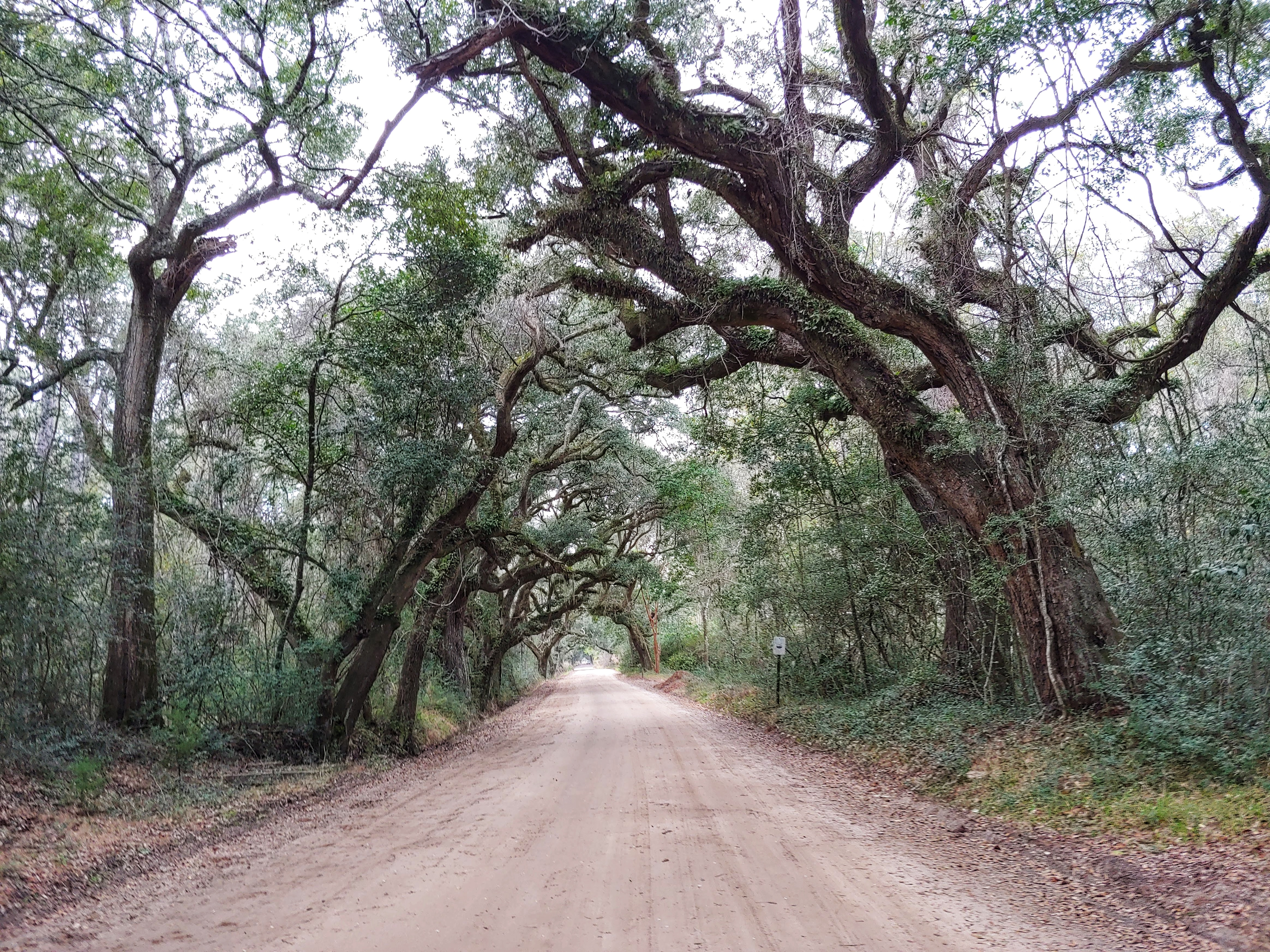
- Botany Bay Rd.
- Interactive map of Botany Bay Heritage Preserve

- Bleak Hall Plantation Outbuildings
- U.S. National Register of Historic Places
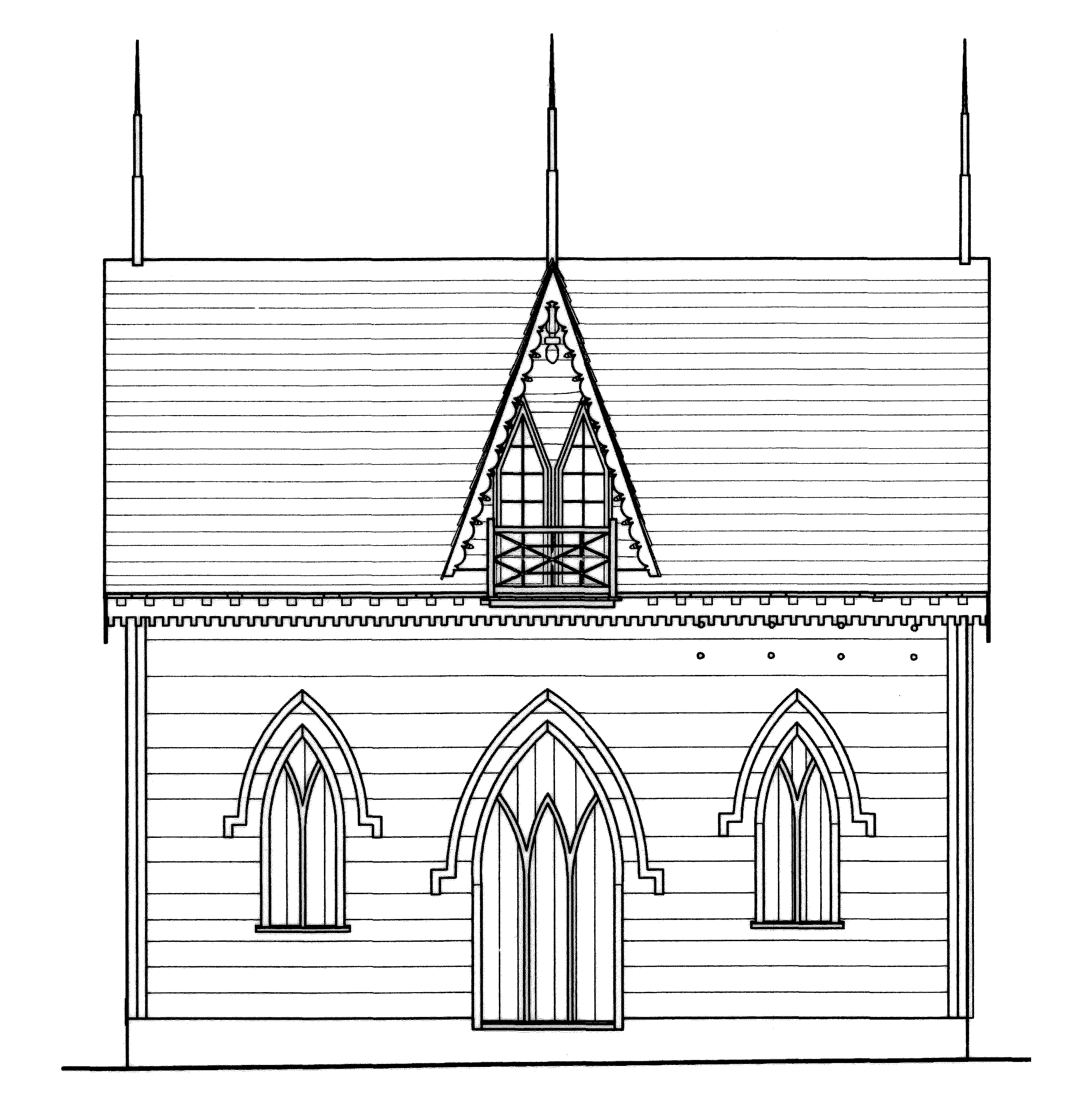
- Ice House, west elevation

- Location within South Carolina Location within the United States
- Location: Botany Bay Road, Edisto Island, SC
- Coordinates: 32°33′9″N 80°14′1″W
- Built: c. 1840s
- Architectural style: Gothic Revival
- NRHP reference No.: 73001698
- Added to NRHP: March 7, 1973

Botany Bay Heritage Preserve & Wildlife Management Area is a state preserve on Edisto Island, South Carolina. Botany Bay Plantation was formed in the 1930s from the merger of the Colonial-era Sea Cloud Plantation and Bleak Hall Plantation. In 1977, it was bequeathed to the state as a wildlife preserve; it was opened to the public in 2008. The preserve includes a number of registered historic sites, including two listed in the National Register of Historic Places: a set of three surviving 1840s outbuildings from Bleak Hall Plantation, and the prehistoric Fig Island shell rings.

== History ==
=== Sea Cloud Plantation ===
In 1695, Christopher Hinkley received a grant of 170 acres (69 ha) on Edisto Island. In 1727, the property was acquired by Paul Hamilton Sr.; in 1748, by Paul Hamilton Jr. At some time after the Revolutionary War, a 21-acre (8.5 ha) parcel adjoining the Hamilton property was acquired by Normand McLeod. At some point, the property was acquired by Ephraim Mikell Seabrook; in about 1825, he built a house there. It has been suggested that the name "Sea Cloud Plantation" was bestowed after the marriage of a Seabrook to a McLeod.

=== Bleak Hall Plantation ===
In the late 1790s, Daniel Townsend III began developing Bleak Hall Plantation. In 1799, his first son, John Townsend, was born at the plantation. His wife was Hephzibah Jenkins Townsend. In about 1805, a mansion was built; in about 1842, John Townsend inherited the property. At some point in the 1840s, he acquired the Sea Cloud Plantation as well.

John Townsend was noted as an agriculturist and political leader in 19th century South Carolina. He was one of the state's largest planters of Sea Island cotton; his cotton commanded a high price from lace-makers in Belgium and France, and won several prizes, for both its quality and its length. Between 1822 and 1858, Townsend served several terms in the South Carolina General Assembly. In the census of 1860, John Townsend was registered as the owner of 272 enslaved laborers. In that year, he defended the institution of slavery and advocated for secession from the Union to protect it in an address to the Edisto Island Vigilant Association. In the early 1860s, Townsend was a delegate to the state's Secession Convention, and a signer of the Ordinance of Secession, whereby South Carolina withdrew from the United States, part of a chain of events leading to the American Civil War.

In November 1861, Edisto Island was evacuated. During the Civil War, both Union and Confederate forces used the cupola atop the Bleak Hall plantation house as a lookout. This house burned down during or shortly after the war, and a new one was built in a mix of Victorian styles. The war had disrupted property records, and Townsend was only able to establish his ownership of the combined plantations through an appeal to U.S. president Andrew Johnson.

Townsend died at Bleak Hall in 1881. The plantation continued to produce a valuable crop of Sea Island cotton until 1917, when the boll weevil reached Edisto Island. By the early 1920s, production of cotton had ceased, and the plantation was used for farming and timber production.

=== Botany Bay Plantation ===
The Bleak Hall and Sea Cloud plantations remained in the Townsend family until 1933, when they were bought by Dr. James C. Greenway, part of the Lauder Greenway Family, who combined them to form Botany Bay Plantation.

In 1968, hotel and real estate magnate John E. "Jason" Meyer bought Botany Bay. During his time as the owner of the property, Meyer approved the construction of a dike which illegally obstructed a portion of nearby Ocella Creek and the surrounding marsh, creating a lake for duck hunting and fishing. When his actions became known to authorities, Meyer made a deal with the attorney general which bequeathed the 4,630-acre (1,870 ha) plantation to the state of South Carolina as a wildlife preserve upon his death. However, it was stipulated that should he predecease his wife Margaret, she would retain the use of the property. John Meyer died in 1977; his widow remarried as Margaret Pepper, and remained on the plantation, continuing to manage and improve the property for conservation purposes, until her death in 2007. In 2008, the property was opened to the public under the name "Botany Bay Plantation Heritage Preserve/Wildlife Management Area", managed by the South Carolina Department of Natural Resources.

== Historic preservation ==
=== Bleak Hall outbuildings ===
Three outbuildings from the Bleak Hall Plantation, thought to date from the 1840s, remain on the Botany Bay preserve. In 1973, the buildings were listed in the National Register of Historic Places, for their connection with John Townsend and as surviving examples of the Gothic Revival architecture used on the plantation.

One of these buildings is a 1 1/2-story icehouse, built out of wood on a partial basement with tabby walls. The building has a high gable roof oriented north–south; on the east and west sides are high triangular dormers, each with two pointed windows and a small balcony. Three-level wooden spires, topped with pendants, rise from the peaks of the gables and the dormers. The roof is slightly flared at the eaves. Barge boards cut in circular designs decorate the gable eaves; boards decorated with dentils run below the eaves on the east and west sides of the building. The north and south ends both have two doors: one at ground level and one in the gable. Two paneless windows closed by narrow shutters flank each of the lower-level windows. On the east and west sides of the building are mock Gothic doors and windows.

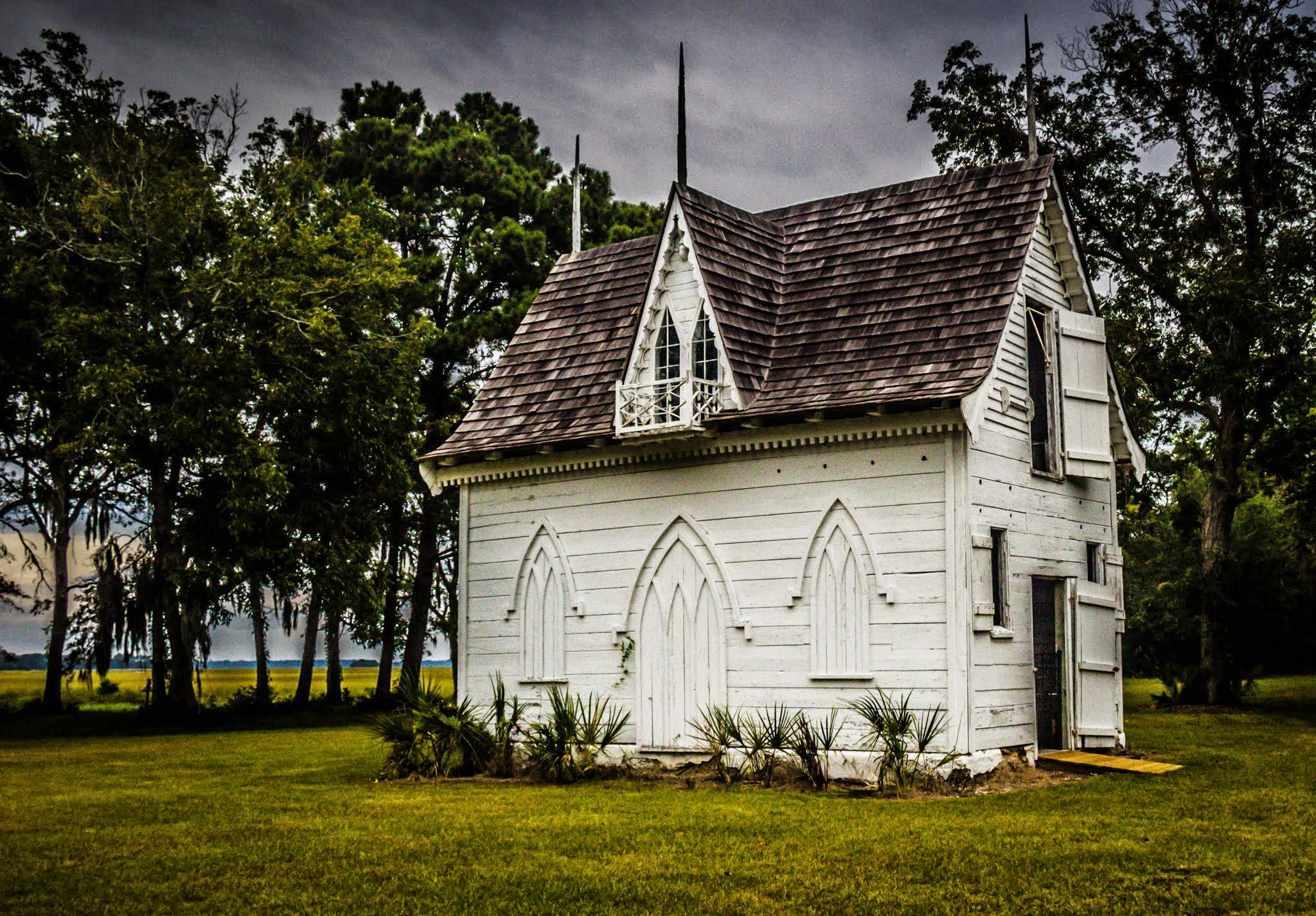
Botany Bay Plantation outbuilding

Near the icehouse is a small tabby building, thought to have been used as a gardener's shed and/or a smokehouse. The building has a single door and no windows. The roof is slightly bell-cast, clad with cypress shingles, and topped with a wood finial; a board decorated with large serrated dentils runs around the building below the eaves.

A short distance from these two buildings, near the site of the original Bleak Hall house, is another tabby building, thought to have been used as a barn during the Colonial period and subsequently used as an equipment shed. The building's high gable roof, oriented north–south, is clad in cypress shingles. A wooden spire topped with a pendant rises from each gable end. Barge boards decorated with dentils cover the gable eaves; boards decorated with serrations run below the east and west eaves. There are doors on the north and south sides.

Near the icehouse and the gardener's shed/smokehouse are the remnants of John Townsend's Japanese garden. When the Perry Expedition returned from the Orient in 1855, they were accompanied by one Oqui, variously described as a "Japanese botanist", a "Japanese gardener", and a Chinese florist and gardener. Learning of this, Townsend travelled to Washington, D.C., and persuaded Oqui to return to South Carolina with him, there to lay out extensive Oriental formal gardens. Remains of the gardens, including some of the exotic plants, survive into the early 21st century.

=== Other historic sites ===
Twenty-one registered historic sites lie on Botany Bay Heritage Preserve & WMA, including the remains of the Sea Cloud plantation house, the chimney of a slave house, and a beehive-shaped brick well originally built to provide water for the Sea Cloud slaves.

The Fig Island Shell Rings, with an age estimated at 3000–5000 years, are on the property; they are listed in the National Register of Historic Places.

== Wildlife and habitat ==
Botany Bay HP * WMA includes a variety of habitats: 2,500 acres (1,000 ha) of marine and estuarine wetlands, including 2 miles (3 km) of beachfront used for nesting by endangered loggerhead sea turtles and least terns; 1,847 acres (747 ha) of upland, consisting chiefly of mixed pine-hardwood forest; and 283 acres (115 ha) of agricultural fields, managed for dove hunting and as food plots for wildlife. A set of dikes creates freshwater and brackish ponds.
