= Sunnyside (Edisto Island, South Carolina) =

Historic house in South Carolina, United States

- U.S. National Register of Historic Places
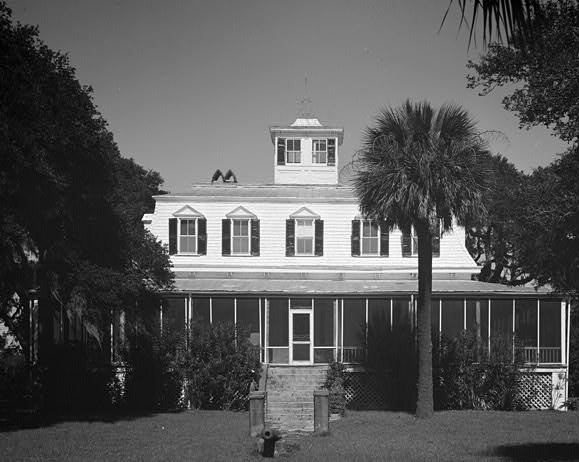
- Sunnyside Plantation, HABS Photo, 1977-1979

- Location within South Carolina Location within the United States
- Location: Off the northern side of Peter's Point Rd.; also north of the junction of Peters Point and Creekwood Rd., Edisto Island, South Carolina
- Coordinates: 32°33′57″N 80°17′50″W
- Area: 4.5 acres (1.8 ha)
- Built: 1867, c. 1875
- MPS: Edisto Island MRA
- NRHP reference No.: 86003216, 94000024 (Boundary Increase)
- Added to NRHP: November 28, 1986, February 4, 1994 (Boundary Increase)

Sunnyside, also known as the Townsend Mikell House, is a historic plantation house located at Edisto Island, Charleston County, South Carolina. The main house was built about 1875, and is a 1 1/2-story, rectangular, frame, weatherboard-clad residence. It features a mansard roof topped by a cupola and one-story, hipped roof wraparound porch. Also on the property are the tabby foundation of a cotton gin; two small, rectangular, one-story, gable roof, weatherboard-clad outbuildings; a 1 1/2-story barn; and the Sunnyside Plantation Foreman's House. The Foreman's House is a two-story, weatherboard-clad, frame residence built about 1867.

It was listed on the National Register of Historic Places in 1986, with a boundary increase in 1994.
