= Presbyterian Manse (Edisto Island, South Carolina) =

- U.S. National Register of Historic Places
- Location within South Carolina Location within the United States
- Nearest city: Edisto Island, South Carolina
- Coordinates: 32°34′4″N 80°18′34″W
- Area: 1 acre (0.40 ha)
- Built: 1790
- NRHP reference No.: 71000757
- Added to NRHP: May 14, 1971

Presbyterian Manse is a historic wooden building on Edisto Island, South Carolina. This 2 1/2-story building was built in 1790 and added to the National Register of Historic Places on May 14, 1971. The building which land was donated by Henry Bowers was constructed for the minister of the church.
