= Edisto Island Presbyterian Church =

Historic church in South Carolina, United States

- The Presbyterian Church on Edisto Island
- U.S. National Register of Historic Places
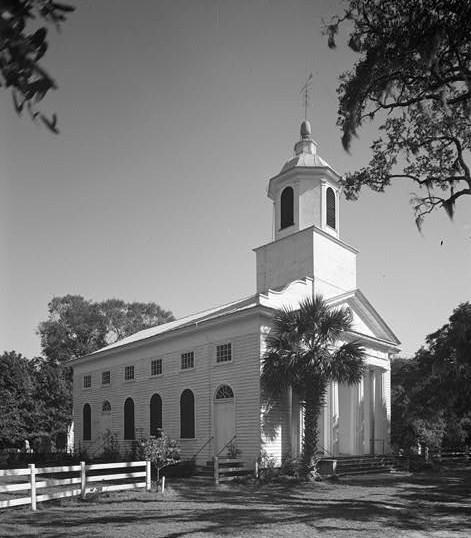

- Location within South Carolina Location within the United States
- Nearest city: Edisto Island, South Carolina
- Coordinates: 32°34′44″N 80°17′49″W
- Area: 2 acres (0.81 ha)
- Built: 1831
- Architect: Pillans, Mr.; Curtis, E. M.
- NRHP reference No.: 71000754
- Added to NRHP: June 24, 1971

The Presbyterian Church on Edisto Island is a historic Presbyterian church on Edisto Island, South Carolina.

The congregation was founded in 1685 and the current church building was constructed in 1831. The church's burying ground is adjacent to the building. The church was added to the National Register of Historic Places on June 24, 1971. The congregation is a member of the Presbyterian Church (USA).

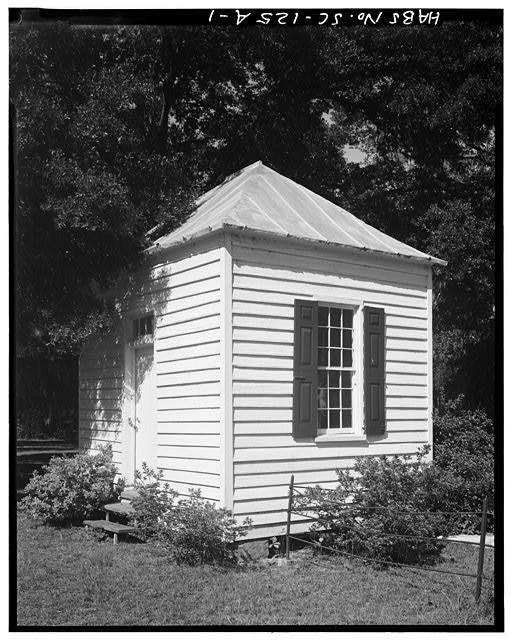
Session House used for smaller meetings by the Session
