= Windsor Plantation =

Historic house in South Carolina, United States

- U.S. National Register of Historic Places
- Location within South Carolina Location within the United States
- Location: 3050 Highway 174, Edisto Island, South Carolina
- Coordinates: 32°35′58″N 80°20′41″W
- Built: 1857
- NRHP reference No.: 74001837
- Added to NRHP: July 23, 1974

Windsor Plantation (also known as Little Edisto Plantation and Ashwood Plantation) is a historic house on Russell Creek on Edisto Island, South Carolina.

The Windsor Plantation house was constructed in about 1857 as a wedding gift to the son of Edward Whaley. The large clapboard house is a good example of a Georgian-inspired sea island cotton plantation. The house was listed on the National Register of Historic Places on July 23, 1974.
