= Edisto Island Baptist Church =

Historic church in South Carolina, United States

- U.S. National Register of Historic Places
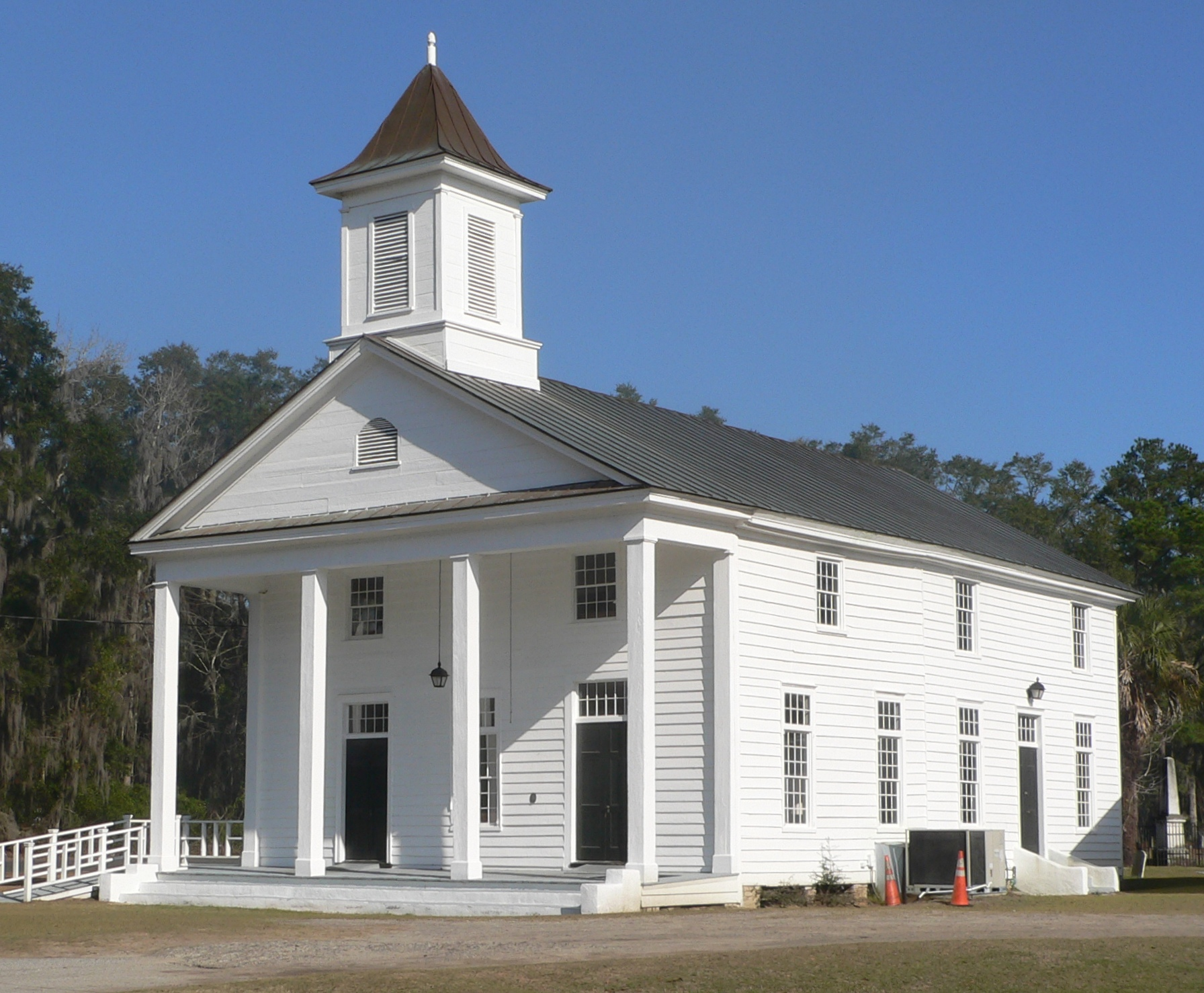

- Location within South Carolina Location within the United States
- Location: 1644 South Carolina Highway 174, Edisto Island, South Carolina
- Coordinates: 32°34′22.4″N 80°17′3″W
- Area: 1 acre (0.40 ha)
- Built: 1818, 1865, 1880
- MPS: Edisto Island MRA (AD)
- NRHP reference No.: 82003839
- Added to NRHP: April 01, 1982

Edisto Island Baptist Church is a historic African-American Baptist church on Edisto Island in Charleston County, South Carolina. Built in 1818, it is a two-story church sheathed in beaded weatherboard with a medium pitched gable roof. An addition doubling its size was completed about 1865, and a two-story pedimented portico was added in 1880.

It was added to the National Register of Historic Places in 1982.
