= Edisto Island =

- Unincorporated area
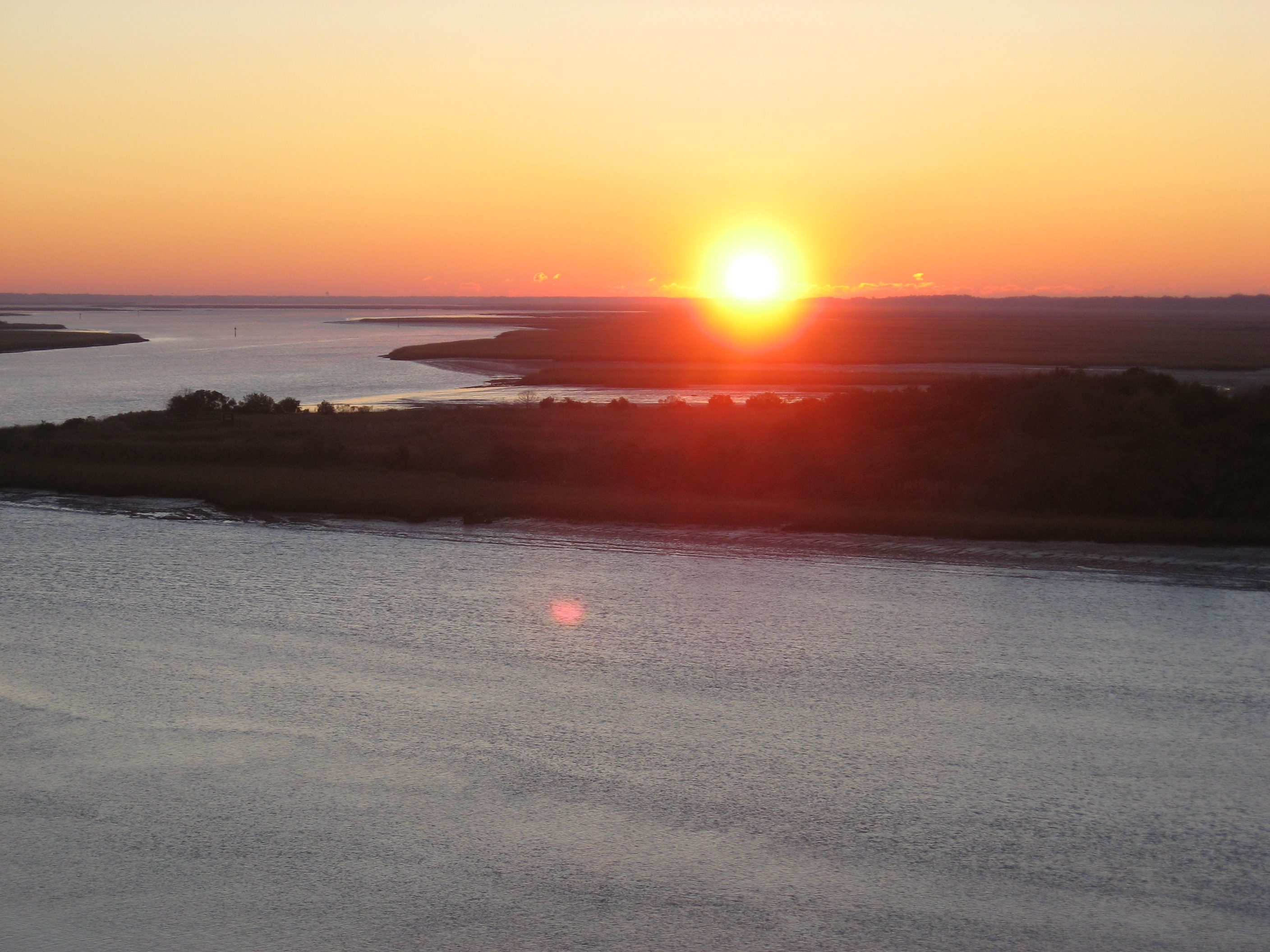

- Location of Edisto Island in South Carolina
- Coordinates: 32°33′34″N 80°17′42″W
- Country: United States
- State: South Carolina
- County: Charleston
- Named for: Edisto people

Area
  - Total: 67.8 sq mi (175.5 km^{2})
  - Land: 67.6 sq mi (175.1 km^{2})
  - Water: 0.15 sq mi (0.4 km^{2})
- Elevation: 9.8 ft (3 m)

Population (2000)
  - Total: 2,301
- Time zone: UTC-5 (Eastern (EST))
  - Summer (DST): UTC-4 (EDT)
- ZIP Code: 29438
- Area codes: 843 and 854
- GNIS feature ID: 1247638

Edisto Island is an American island, one of South Carolina's Sea Islands, the larger part of which lies in Charleston County, with its southern tip in Colleton County. Edisto Beach is in Colleton County, and the Charleston County part of the island is unincorporated.

The island, the town, and the Edisto River are named after the historic Edistow people, a Native American sub-tribe of the Cusabo who inhabited the island as well as nearby mainland areas.

== History ==
Indigenous peoples often had fishing camps on the islands, using them seasonally. The historic Edisto people are known to have occupied the island as well as mainland areas and traded with the upcountry Catawba. The sub-tribe became extinct during the colonial period. The Wassamasaw Tribe of Varnertown Indians is a group of descendants of various tribes, including Edisto, who intermarried and who have occupied a settlement between Summerville and Moncks Corner in Berkeley County, South Carolina. In 2009, they gained state recognition as an Indian Tribe, one of nine tribes to do so.

The first tracts of land, called plantations, were granted on Edisto Island before 1700. There were several attempts by the French and the Spanish to settle in this area in the 1500s, however, those attempts all failed. The first group of Europeans who succeeded in settling Edisto Island were English people who settled the island in the late 1600s and early 1700s. Though it is unclear when the modern name was adopted, the island was called "Locke Island", after the English philosopher and Secretary to the Lords Proprietors of Carolina John Locke, during the late 1600s. For most of the 1700s, the area exported rice. Landowners first harvested timber and deerskins, planted indigo and some rice, and kept herds of free-ranging cattle to produce hides for the European market and salt beef for Caribbean plantations. Cotton gradually became the principal crop, and after the American Revolution, Edisto Island planters became wealthy and famous from their production of long-staple Sea Island cotton. The labor was done by hundreds of enslaved Africans who developed the creole Gullah language and culture on the islands and in the Lowcountry, distinctive for its African traditions.

During the American Revolution, there were many British soldiers present on Edisto Island. After retaking Savannah in 1778, the British pushed into South Carolina and, during this time, Beaufort was made into their headquarters. Hence, a significant number of British troops were stationed on Edisto Island after the capture of Charleston in 1780.

The 1790 census reported the island had a population of 223 Whites and 1,692 Black slaves. The 1860 census indicated 329 Whites and 5,082 slaves.

=== Civil war ===
Edisto Island was largely abandoned by planters in November and December 1861, and escaped slaves began setting up their own refugee camps there. In January 1862, armed settlers from the island and Confederate forces clashed, and a Confederate raid in reprisal killed unarmed settlers. In February, Union forces were stationed on the island to develop it as a staging area for future campaigns against Charleston, twenty-five miles away, as well as to protect the colony, which would eventually number thousands of settlers. As Union forces took control of the island, a number of skirmishes occurred, and Confederates withdrew. Pineberry Battery was further up the Edisto River from the island, which was one likely path for a land campaign against Charleston. In June, most of the Union troops left the island in a campaign, which culminated in the Battle of Secessionville. In July, the remaining troops withdrew, and the colony was removed to St. Helena Island. For the rest of the war, a small number of escaped slaves and plantation owners remained and farmed the island, but it was largely abandoned. Near the end of the war, the island was again used as a location of colonies of freed slaves.

=== Reconstruction ===
From 1865 until 1877 the Island was primarily run by agents of the Freedmen's Bureau as well by recently freed African Americans. As a result, the island became a base of support for the Republican Party. While Klan terror affected much of the state, Edisto Island was largely spared this by coincidence. There were troops from the United States Army present on Edisto Island, and the population was overwhelmingly African-American. Most whites on the island were either troops from the United States Army or agents of the Freedmen's Bureau. As a result, the Klan deemed the area not worth it, and focused their activities elsewhere in the state.

=== Historic preservation ===
Since the twentieth century, the island has been redeveloped for use as a tourist destination and resorts, although some private plantations remain.

The Alexander Bache U.S. Coast Survey Line, Bailey's Store, Bleak Hall Plantation Outbuildings, Brick House Ruins, Brookland Plantation, Cassina Point, Crawford's Plantation House, Edisto Island Baptist Church, Edisto Island Presbyterian Church, Fig Island, Frogmore, Paul Grimball House Ruins, Hutchinson House, Middleton's Plantation, Oak Island, Old House Plantation, Peter's Point Plantation, Presbyterian Manse, Prospect Hill, William Seabrook House, Seaside School, Seaside Plantation House, Spanish Mount Point, Sunnyside, Hephzibah Jenkins Townsend's Tabby Oven Ruins, Trinity Church, Wescott Road, and Windsor Plantation are listed in the National Register of Historic Places.

== Geography ==
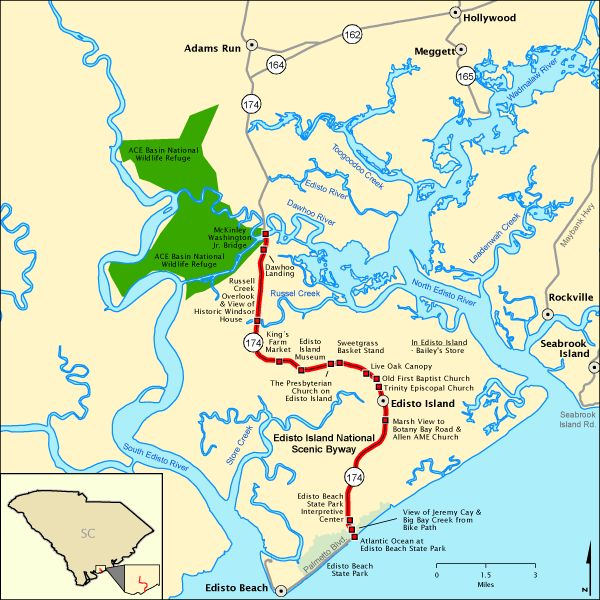
Map of the island

Edisto Island is located 26 miles (42 km) southwest of Charleston. Edisto Island is home to Edisto Beach and Wyndham Oceanridge resort.

Edisto Beach State Park is also located on the island. The park is open to day-visitors as well as tent and RV camping. The park has a ranger station, bathrooms with running water and showers, a playground, and an education center. The campsites are unique in that there are many that are on the beachfront, overlooking the ocean. Hanging-moss trees shade the park. Each site is equipped with electricity and water hook-ups, a fire pit, and a picnic table.

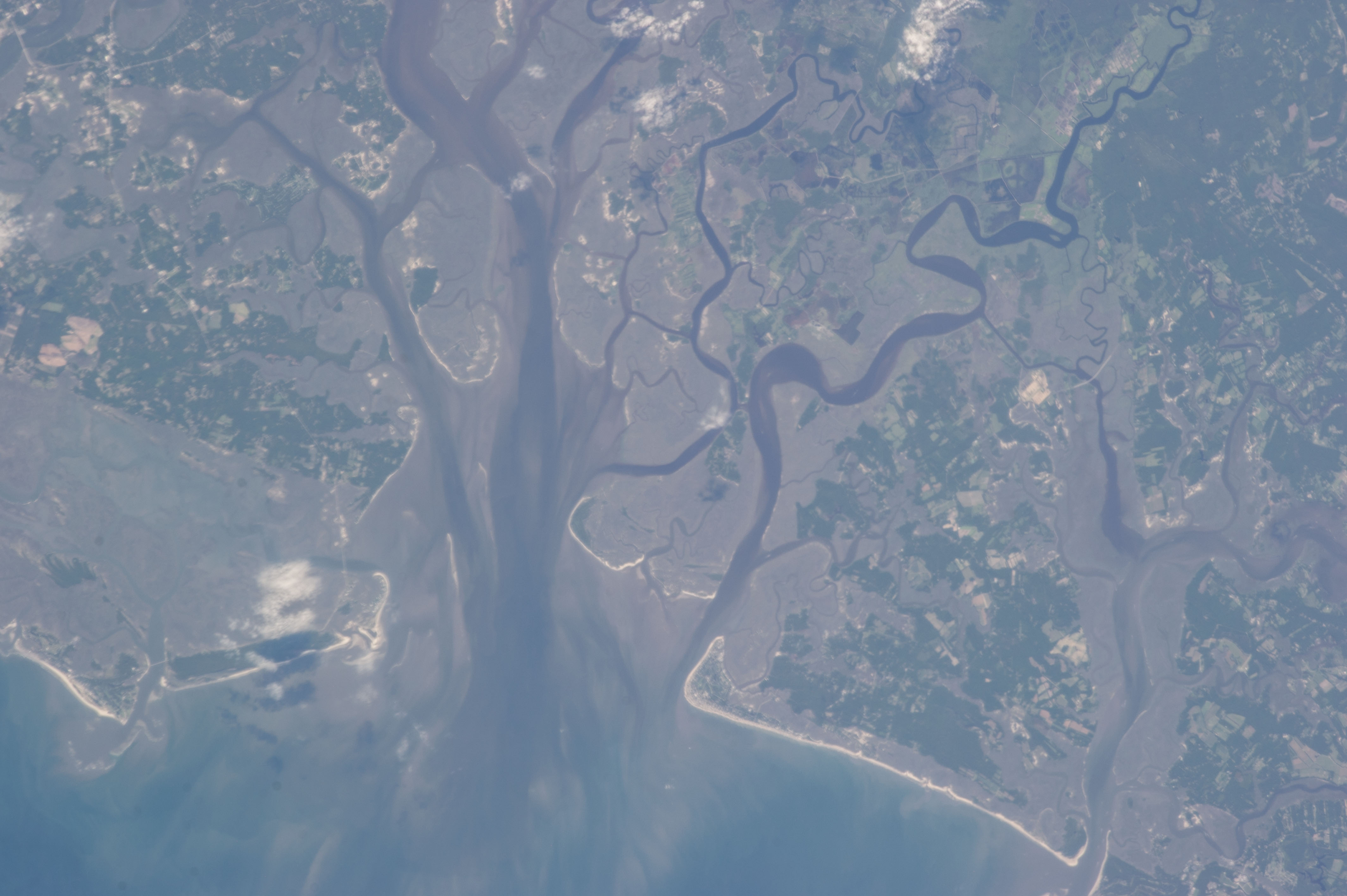
View from space (Edisto Island is in the center-right of the picture)

== Notable people ==
- Kardea Brown, cook and host of Food Network's Delicious Miss Brown, films the show on the island at her family's house.
- James C. Greenway, a member of the Lauder Greenway Family and founder of the Yale School of Public Health, combined several properties to create Botany Bay on the island.
- James Jamerson, renowned bass player and member of the Funk Brothers, who played Motown hits in the 1960s, was born here.
- Micah Jenkins, Confederate general in the American Civil War, mortally wounded by friendly fire at the Battle of the Wilderness
- Jasper Johns, artist b 1930 SC, bought a home and studio at Edisto Beach in 1961. This burned down in a fire in 1966.
- Eleanor Frances Lattimore, author and illustrator of over 50 children's books including the Little Pear series about a boy in China.
- Patti LuPone, Broadway singer and actress, makes a winter home on the island
- Emily Meggett, Geechee-Gullah community leader, chef, and author
- Lucia Murchison, social worker born on Edisto Island; president of the South Carolina Public Health Association in 1965

== See also ==
- Edisto Island during the American Civil War
- Marsh Hen Mill

== Sources ==
- Tomblin, Barbara. Bluejackets and Contrabands: African Americans and the Union Navy. University Press of Kentucky, 2009. - via Project MUSE (subscription required)
