= Edisto Island during the American Civil War =

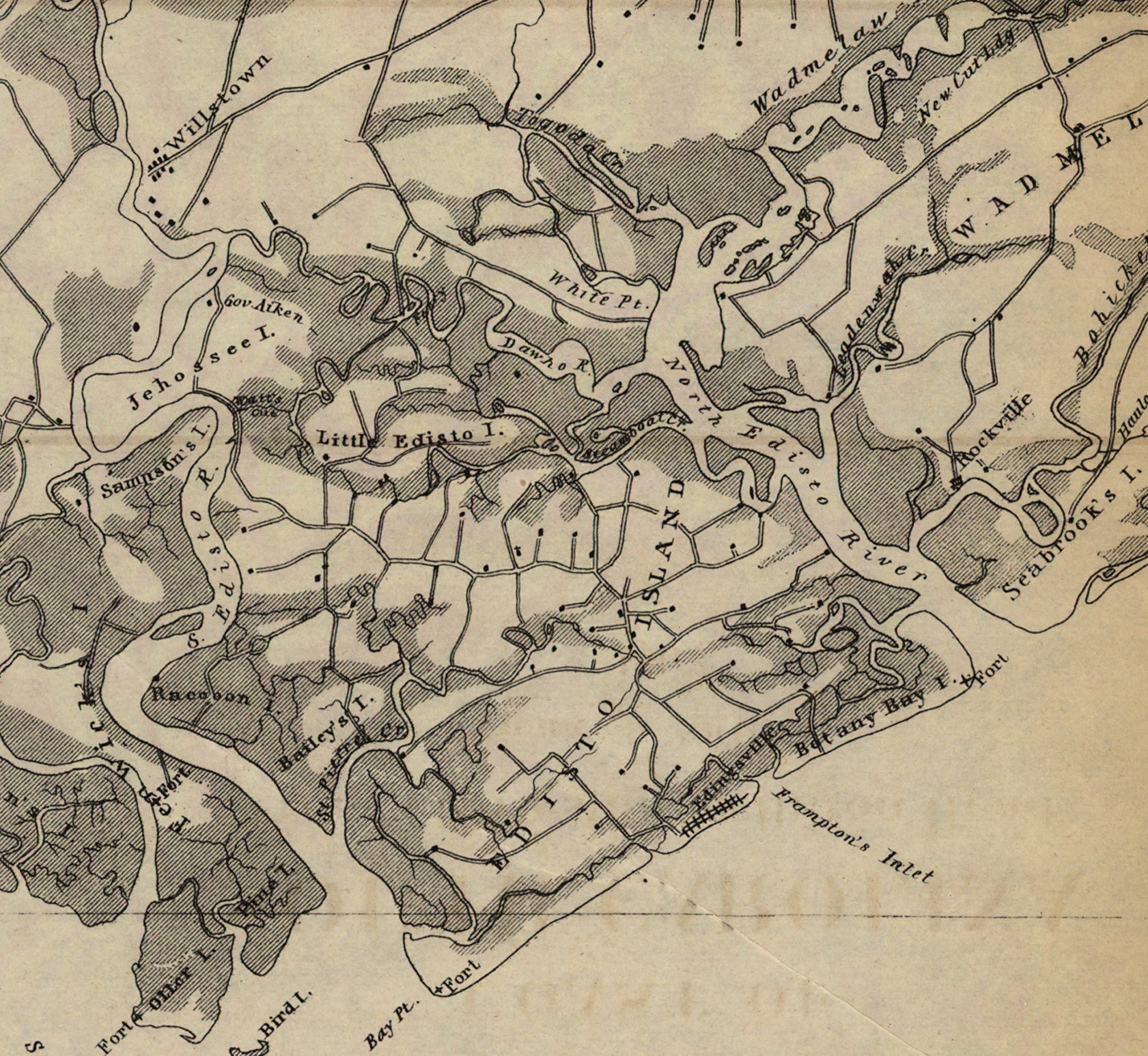
1862 United States Coast Survey map of the Coast of South Carolina from Charleston to Hilton Head cropped to show Edisto Island

Edisto Island was the location of a number of minor engagements and for a time of a large colony of escaped African-American slaves during the American Civil War (1861–1865). Edisto Island was largely abandoned by planters in November 1861 and in December 1861, escaped slaves began setting up their own refugee camps there. In January 1862, armed African Americans from the island and Confederate forces clashed and a Confederate raid in reprisal killed a small number of unarmed African Americans. In February, Union forces were stationed on the island to develop it as a staging area for future campaigns against Charleston, twenty-five miles away, as well as to protect the colony, which would eventually number thousands of African Americans. As Union forces took control of the island, a number of skirmishes occurred, but Confederates withdrew. In June, most of the Union troops left the island in a campaign, which culminated in the Battle of Secessionville. In July, the remaining troops withdrew, and the colony was removed to St. Helena Island. For the rest of the war, a small number of escaped slaves and plantation owners remained and farmed the island, but it was largely abandoned. Near the end of the war, the island was again used as a location of colonies of freed slaves.

== Early war ==
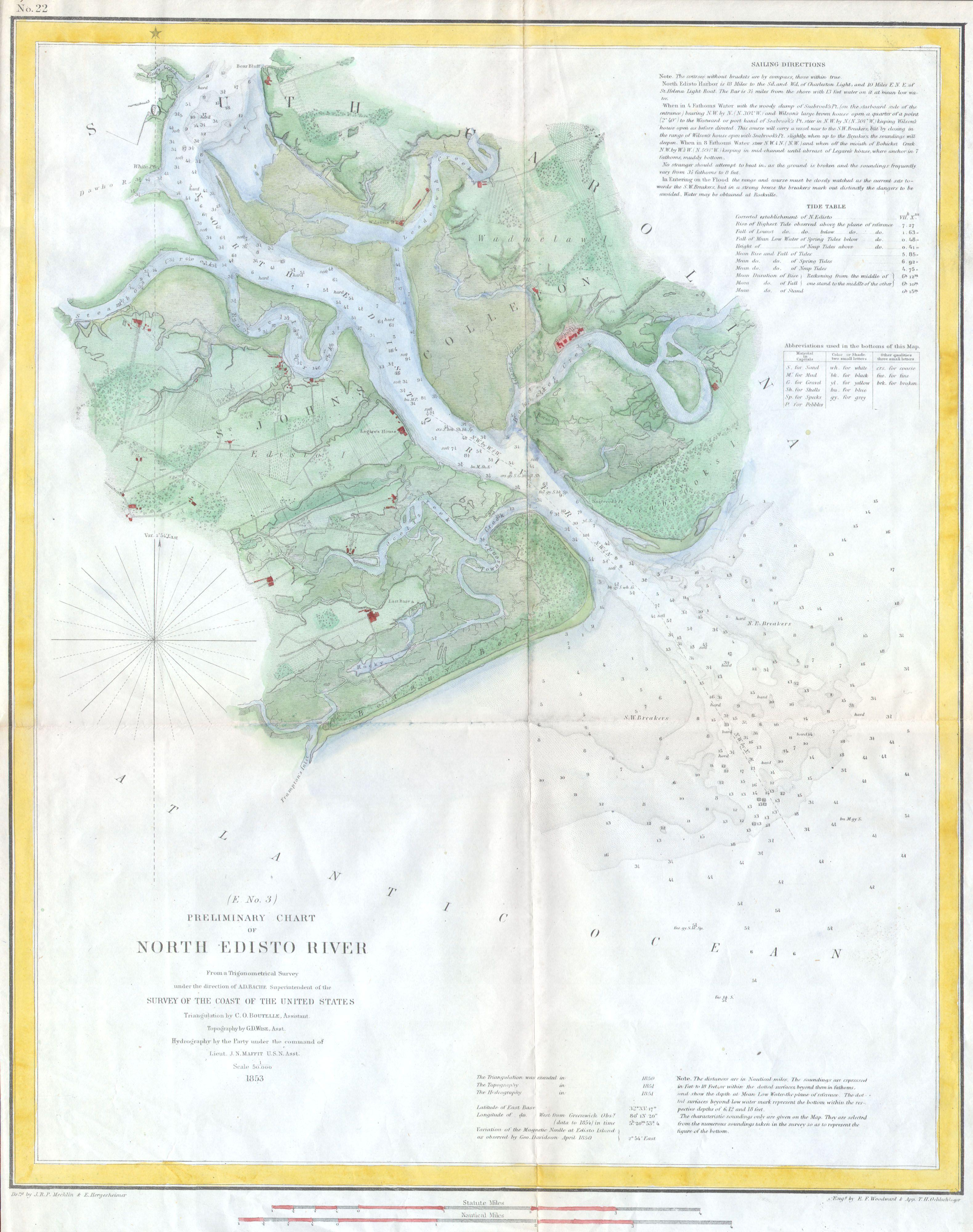
The north Edisto River in an 1853 map. Among the landmarks are the wooded belt on Botany Bay Island, location of the first contraband camps, which can be seen south of the river. The village of Rockville, location of a Confederate camp, is across the river on Wadmalaw Island

After success at the Battle of Ball's Bluff in the late fall of 1861, Confederate officer Nathan George Evans was promoted to Brigadier General and put in command of the Department of South Carolina and Georgia. The protection of Charleston was an important part of his charge, and Edisto Island would be a key location in Union plans to advance upon the city. North Edisto afforded a safe harbor for large vessels from which Union forces could move to White Point or Simon's Landing, points near to the Charleston and Savannah Railroad. Confederate General P. G. T. Beauregard commanded the defenses of Charleston, South Carolina, at the start of the Civil War at Fort Sumter on April 12, 1861. In May, Beauregard worked with Edisto Island leader, John F. Townsend of the Bleak Hall Plantation to fortify the island. However, after losing a series of battles in West Virginia, Robert E. Lee was put in command of coastal defenses late in the year. Lee believed the sea islands were indefensible and quietly decided to establish a defense line further inland. Later that year, in November, Union forces established beachheads along the coast, notably at Port Royal. In response, many white plantation owners fled to the interior. Several, including on Edisto Island, burned their cotton before fleeing to prevent the crop from falling into union hands.

In December 1861, Union General Thomas W. Sherman occupied Otter Island, Tybee Island, and St. Helena Sound. Naval commander Samuel F. Du Pont ordered Commander Percival Drayton to assist the army in taking Otter Island. On a reconnaissance trip in St. Helena Sound, Drayton anchored between Otter Island and Edisto Island in St. Helena Sound. While there, he met with a number of slaves, who provided information on rebel actions. Over the coming weeks, Drayton would discover that rebels had attacked and burned slave houses, and the refugees moved Drayton to help establish a colony of over 100 former slaves on Otter Island in December 1861, which would be supervised by Lieutenant James W. Nicholson. The contrabands, as the former slaves were called, were active in their own support as well. For instance, on December 10, contrabands assisted Nicholson in obtaining provisions. While Nicholson was aggressive in defending the camp, Union officials were aware of the threat to the former slaves posed by nearby rebel forces. In mid-December, Drayton made a reconnaissance up the Edisto with the Pawnee, Vixen and Seneca and spied fortifications on Edisto Island. He fired upon the fort but received no reply. He then landed at the fort, which was deserted with the guns. Soon after, Drayton led a party to investigate reports of rebels burning cotton houses and outbuildings and encamped near Rockville. When they arrived at the camp, the Confederates had fled, and African Americans were there pillaging. When Drayton returned to his boat, the Pawnee, 150 African Americans had collected on that and the other boats. Drayton decided to send them to the point of Edisto Island, and they set up a camp in a belt of woods along the seacoast of North Edisto Island, where they were protected from Confederate attacks by a marsh. Drayton left Lieutenant Thomas A. Budd of the Penguin in charge. By December 29, 1861, Lieutenant Daniel Ammen of the Seneca reported that between 700 and 900 African Americans had gathered on Botany Bay Island on the Atlantic side of Edisto Island, although they still faced threats from Confederates who had been seen on North Edisto Island. Ammen and the Seneca had shelled a rebel headquarters and woods on White Point. Ammen wrote to Du Pont on January 21, 1862, that the colony then numbered 1,200 and if Union forces did not occupy Edisto Island, may be unable to defend itself from rebels when collecting food over the country. Ammen also suggested hiring contraband to collect unginned cotton on the island for compensation, and reported that the colony's African-American superintendent wanted to land a force of contrabands at Rockville and drive off the Confederates, who had returned to the camp.

== Uprising and reprisal ==
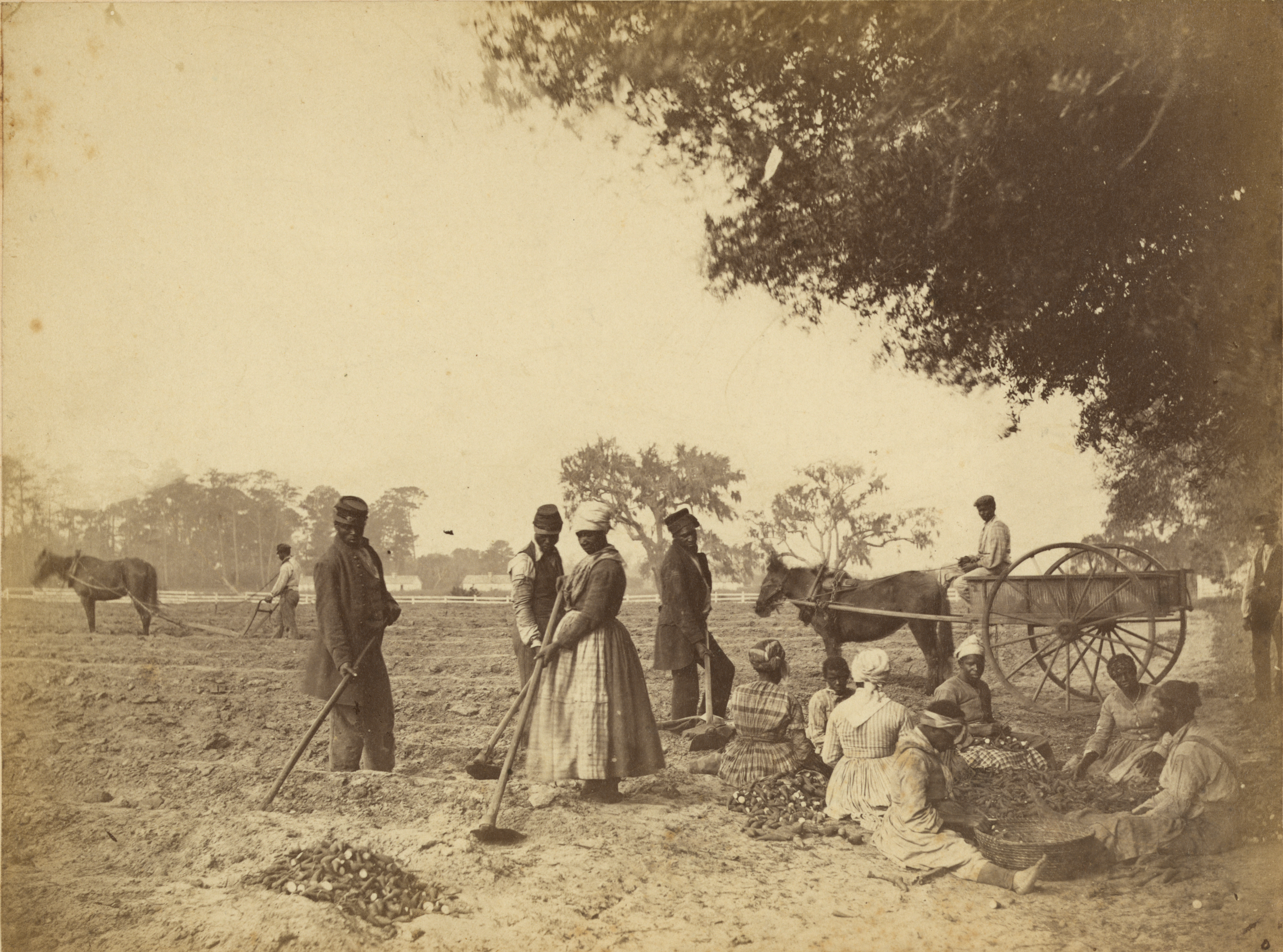
Sweet potato planting, Hopkinson's Plantation, 1862

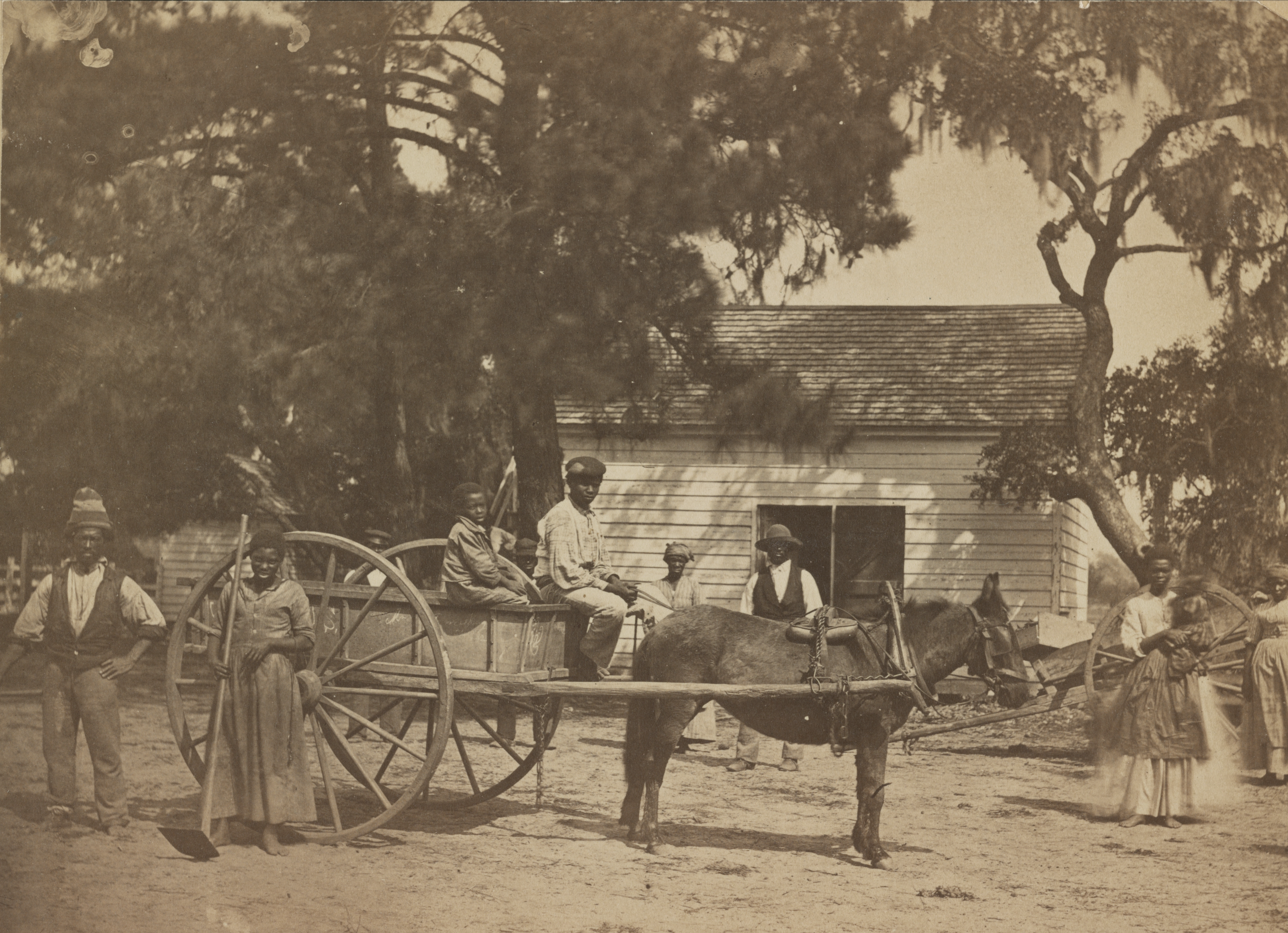
Escaped slaves at the plantation of James Hopkinson, 1862

On January 20, 1862, a group of African Americans collected arms and fired upon Confederate pickets near Watt's Cut. Evans ordered Colonel Peter F. Stevens to take 100 infantry and a company of cavalry to put down the uprising and destroy supplies on Edisto, and Stevens' operation started on the 22nd. Stevens led the Holcombe Legion (also led by Albert Creswell Garlington and William Pinkney Shingler) with 120 infantry and 65 cavalry to make an attack on the contrabands. On January 22, Stevens crossed the Dawho River and arrived at Edisto. Stevens learned that a group of African Americans had recently attacked a local plantation, and searched for them, eventually going to Point of Pines on Edisto Island across from Seabrook Island. Stevens arrived and captured some African Americans. About four former slaves were killed or wounded, including women and elderly individuals, and about 14 were captured, also including women and elderly. However, residents of the camp who were staying in the area had been given an alarm and many fled before the Confederates arrived. On January 23, Union Navy Lieutenant Alexander C. Rhind reported that in response to the attack, he had collected 100 to 150 refugees he found at Point of Pines and ordered the Crusader to shell houses along the river which were reported to house rebel troops. Since that time, he reported that contrabands had been coming in constantly, and were also settling on Botany Bay Island, one of Edisto Island's barrier islands. By February 3, Treasury Agent Edward L. Pierce estimated the camps numbered 2,300, while on February 10, Du Pont estimated eight to ten thousand, and the risk of famine and disease was increasingly apparent.

== Union occupation and engagements ==
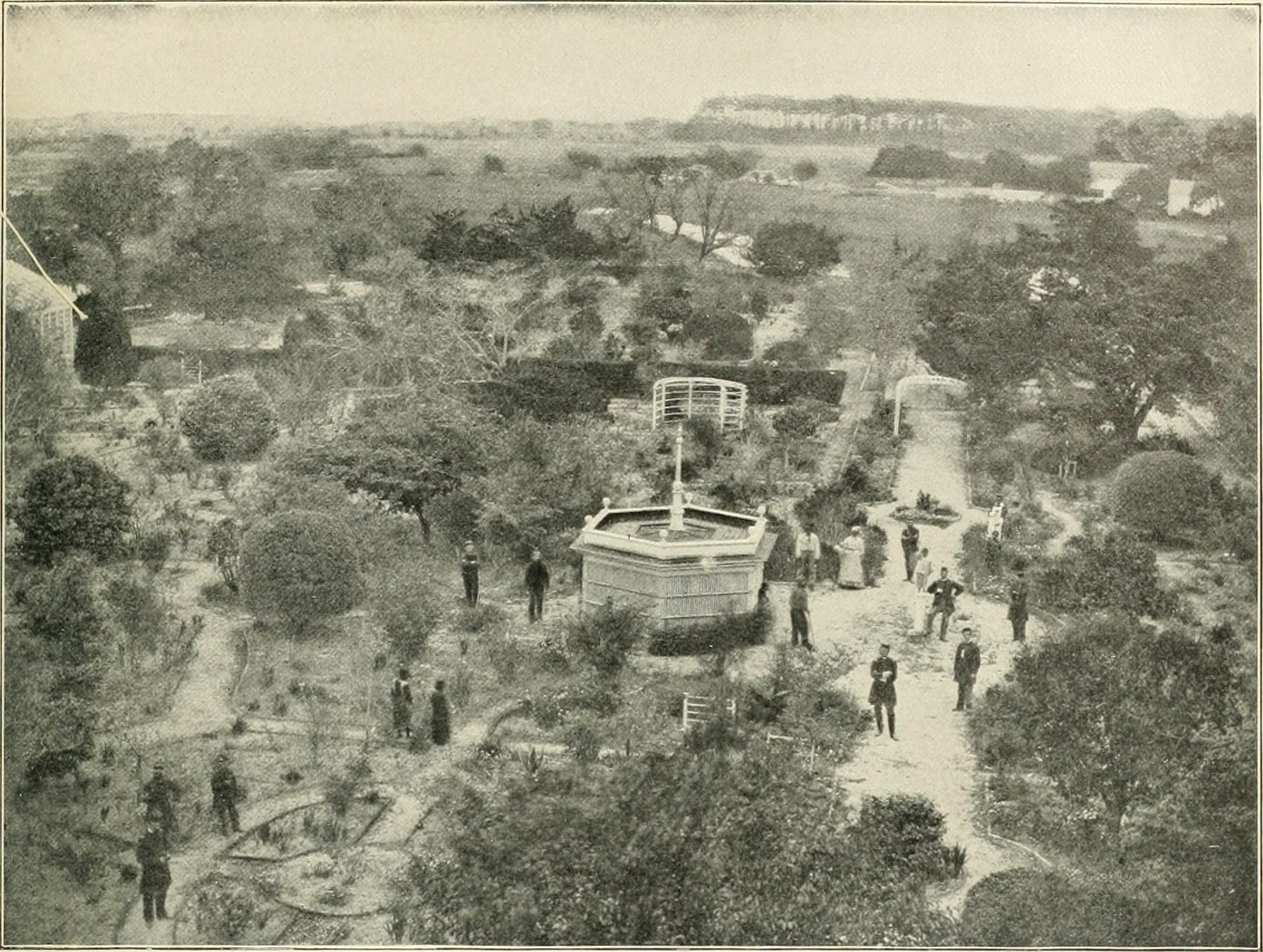
Union troops occupying the grounds of John Seabrook's plantation on Edisto Island.

Thomas Sherman sent a small regiment of soldiers, the 47th New York Infantry, to North Edisto Island on February 12. The soldiers would protect the colony and establish a camp. Regimental Colonel Henry Moore established headquarters at Point of Pines, which would become the headquarters of all Union troops on the island.

By mid-march, Union forces has advanced from Edisto Island to Little Edisto Island with four companies stationed on the northern extremity of both islands, and Evans was informed the Union would cross to the mainland at Edisto Ferry or Pineberry. Evans appointed Colonel P. F. Stevens of the Holcombe Legion to attack the Federals. On March 29, Stevens, with the Holcombe Legion, the Enfield Battalion, and a detachment of dismounted cavalry crossed the river and pushed Federal forces of the 55th Pennsylvania Infantry off Little Edisto Island, capturing 21 prisoners. Federal forces retreated to their artillery on Edisto Island, and the Confederate attack was halted. 2 Union soldiers were killed, and several soldiers were wounded on both sides.

The Union Navy was also heavily involved. On March 18, Pineberry Battery opened fire on a Union Naval reconnaissance. On April 18, the Crusader was ambushed by mounted Confederate forces, wounding three men. A party of 60 Union soldiers from the 2nd New Hampshire Volunteer Infantry and the 55th Pennsylvania Infantry struck out the following morning, bringing one howitzer with them, and skirmished with the Confederates for about 15 minutes before the Confederates retreated. No other Union soldiers were injured or killed. On April 29, a union expeditionary force in the gunboats Hale and Crusader were sent to attack the confederate fortification works near Pineberry, which would lead to the Engagements at Pineberry, Willtown, and White Point.

== Union staging area ==
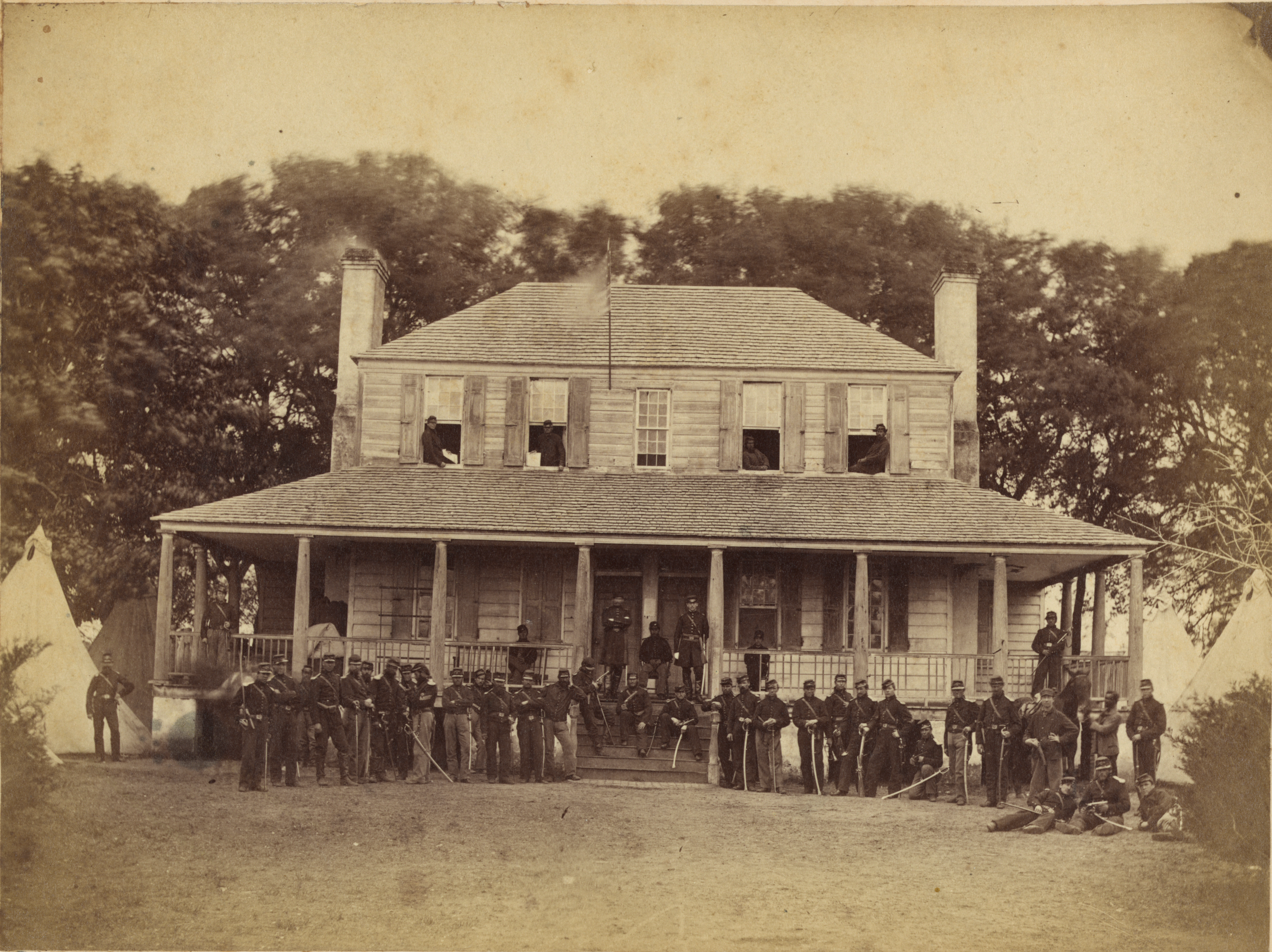
Headquarters of 1st Mass Cavalry, on Edisto Island, 1862

Union forces continued to increase troop presence, and on March 31, 1862, General David Hunter reported that there were fourteen hundred troops on Edisto Island, South Carolina. Hunter had recently replaced Thomas W. Sherman in charge of the district, which he called the Southern Expedition and was based at Port Royal. Brigadier General Henry Benham devised a plan to strike at Charleston. Confederate General John C. Pemberton had abandoned the mouth of the Stono River, allowing Union forces to land on James Island, South Carolina. Benham's plan was to send one division under Brigadier General Isaac Stevens to Sol Legare Island, South Carolina by way of Stono Inlet. A second division under Brigadier General Horatio Wright would disembark from Edisto Island to Johns Island, across it and on to James Island. In May 1862, Union forces on the island came from 13 units: First Massachusetts Cavalry, Third Rhode Island Infantry, Captain Hamilton's Battery of Artillery, Third New Hampshire Infantry, 45th Pennsylvania Infantry, 55th Pennsylvania Infantry, 76th Pennsylvania Infantry, 97th Pennsylvania Infantry, 6th Connecticut Infantry, 7th Connecticut Infantry, 46th New York Infantry, 47th New York Infantry, and Colonel Small's Engineers. The 55th Pennsylvania was the only regiment to remain when the troops disembarked on June 2 on Hunter's campaign to attack Charleston which failed when the Confederate won a victory in the Battle of Secessionville on nearby James Island on June 16.

== Withdrawal of Union troops ==
1862 U.S. Coast Survey map of the Coast of South Carolina from Charleston to Hilton Head

In the summer of 1862, Union troops protecting coastal colonies began to withdraw to reinforce Union General George B. McClellan who was engaged in the Peninsula Campaign in Virginia, a series of battle between March and July. Hunter withdrew the rest of garrison on Edisto Island on July 11, The last troops to leave were companies of the 55th Pennsylvania, one squadron of Massachusetts troops, and two pieces of field artillery served by detachments of the 3rd Rhode Island Infantry. As a result, the superintendent of the contrabands, Francis E. Barnard, organized the 1,600 former slaves with livestock and personal property and they ferried to St. Helena village, where they spent the remainder of the war. The island's farmland and crops of cotton and corn were abandoned. Barnard died on October 18, 1862, of malaria, and Edward L. Pierce reported that the exertions to settle the contraband on St. Helena Island had brought on the fever. A very small number of contraband remained on the island, and the Union Blockade included a station off of North Edisto Island. Notably, recently escaped slave Robert Smalls and the Planter were involved in the withdrawal of troops from the island. Smalls would return to the island in 1865 on an inspection with Brigadier General Rufus Saxton, who was quartermaster of the South Carolina Expeditionary Corps during much of Union occupation of the Island.

== Later activities ==
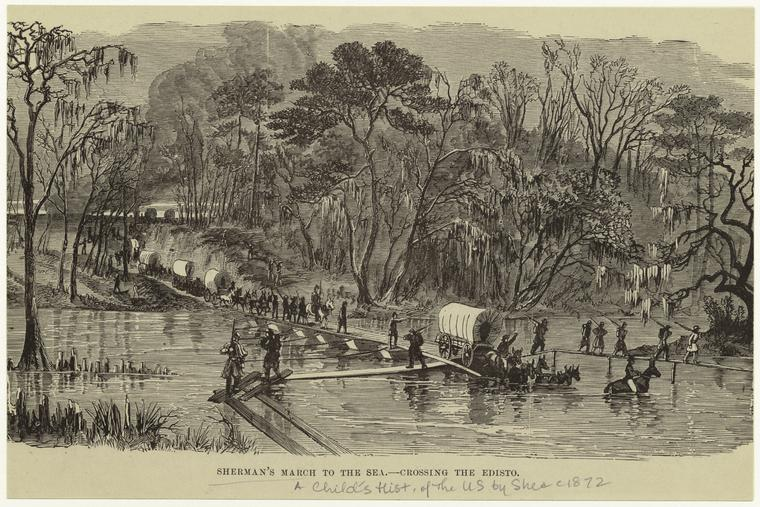
Lithograph of Sherman's Army crossing the Edisto River during the Carolinas Campaign from 1872 children's textbook.

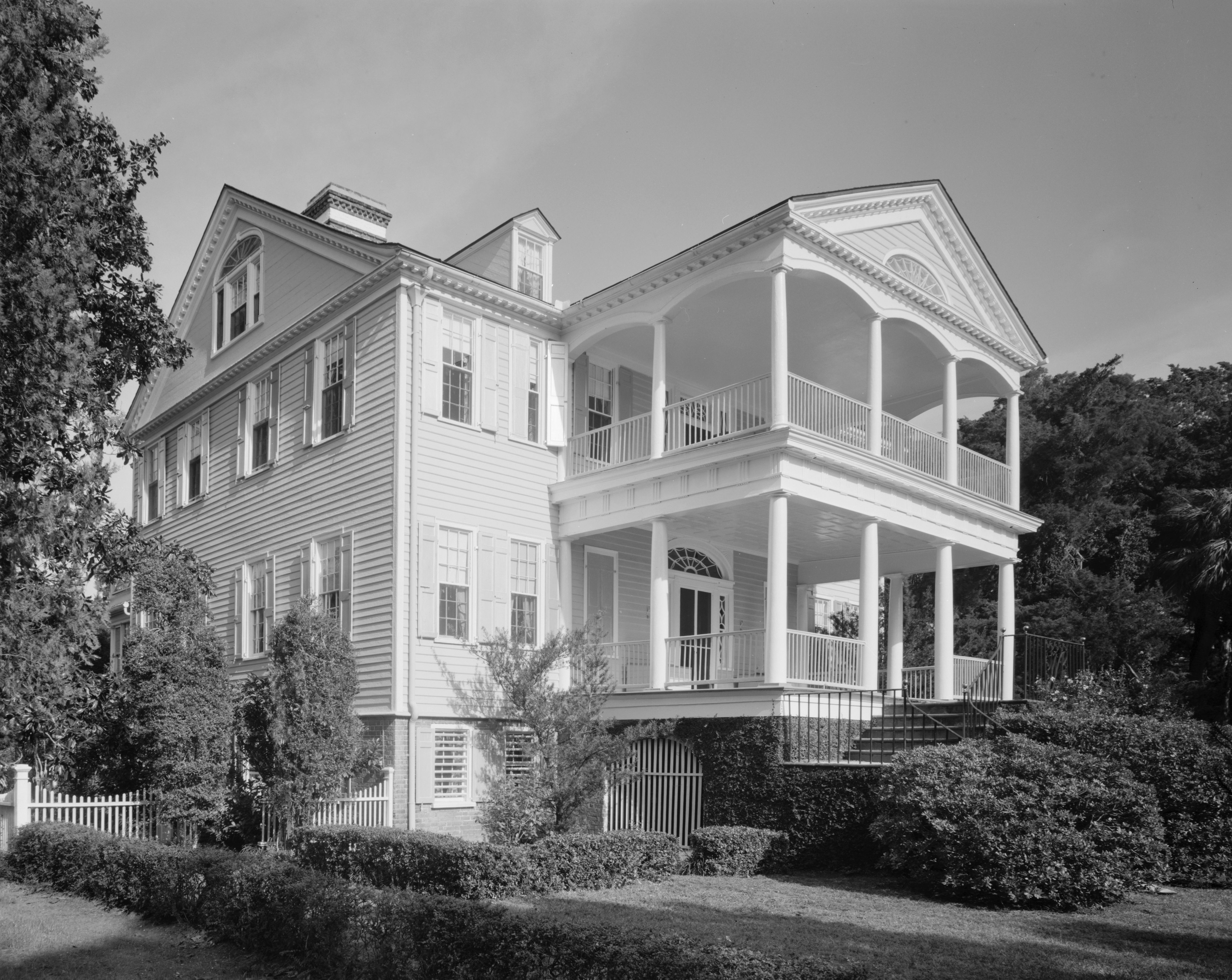
The William Seabrook House, here in 1978, was used as a camp for freed slaves at the end of the war.

On April 9, 1863, two runaway slaves approached captain J. C. Dutch on the bark Kingfisher, which was stationed off the island, and told them about a party of ten scouts from Company I of the 3rd South Carolina Cavalry (then called the Rebel Troop) who were all from the island. The party sought to observe the vessels passing Edisto on the way to and from Charleston in the wake of the First Battle of Charleston Harbor on April 7. Guided by the former slave, three boatloads of sailors landed surrounded the house where the Confederates were staying and captured all but one of them. In May, 1863, a force of 12 riflemen was sent by Dutch to the island on a raid of corn stored on several of the island's estates to help support the contrabands of nearby camps.

In December 1864, William T. Sherman had successfully captured Savannah in his March to the Sea. During his campaign, a large number of slaves had fled and followed behind Sherman's Army. General Rufus Saxton, who had been a quartermaster under Thomas Sherman at Hilton Head in charge of contraband on various islands, including at Edisto, in 1862, recommended St. Simons Island in Georgia and Edisto Island as good locations for new colonies, as both had previously held colonies but were relatively free of rebels. At the end of the war, Saxton was made Inspector of Settlements and Plantations. Under his supervision, many former refugees returned to Edisto. In 1865, the Freedmen's Bureau was supervising the colony on Edisto. Former plantations, such as the William Seabrook plantation were used as camps and Crawford's Plantation House owned by Confederate officer, William J. Whaley, was used to house Freedmen's Bureau teachers Mary Ames and Emily Bliss.

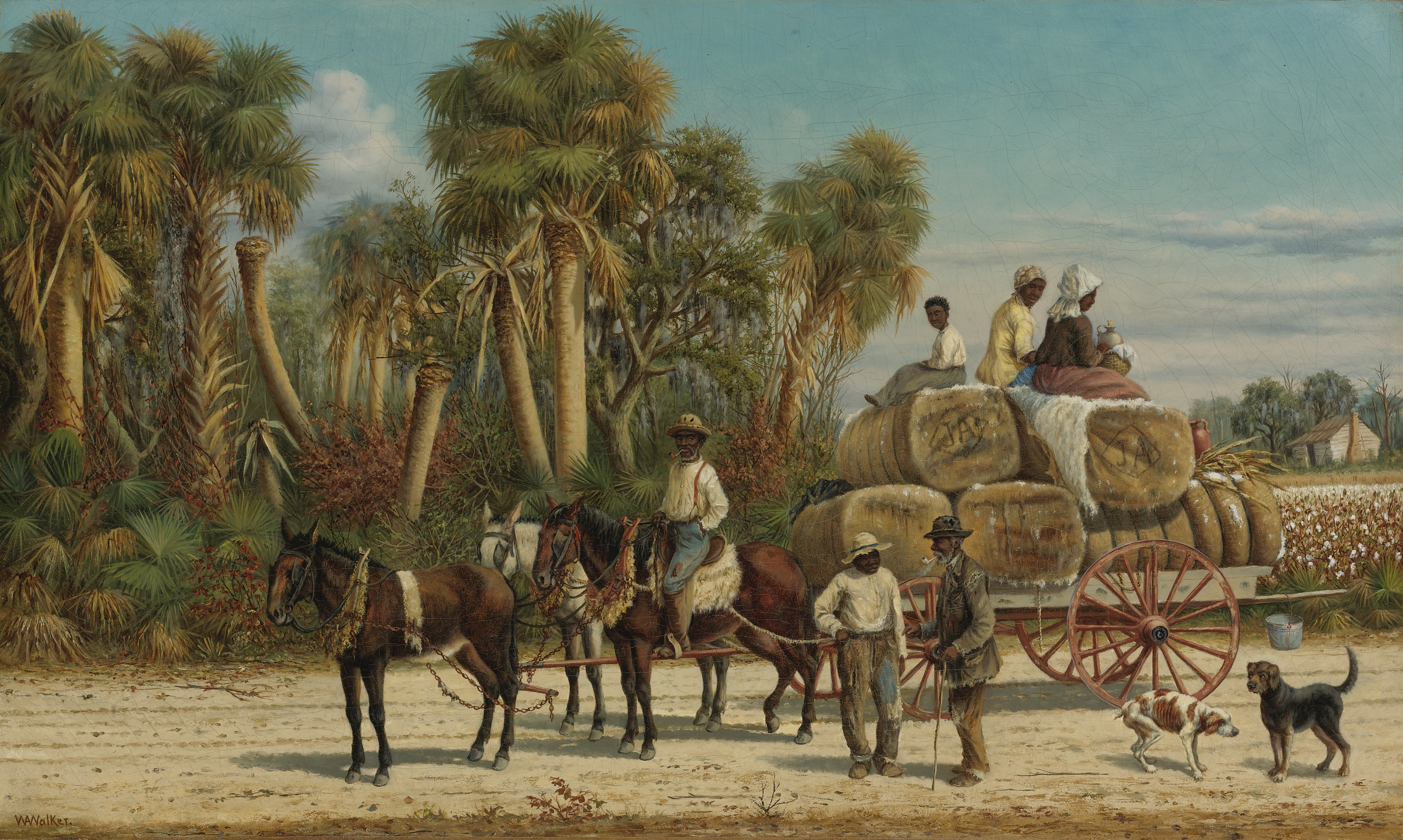
William Aiken Walker painted scenes of African American life on Edisto and the Carolina Coast such as this painting, The Cotton Wagon, from nearby Long Point

== Sources ==
- Allardice, Bruce S. More Generals in Gray. LSU Press, 2006. – via Project MUSE (subscription required)
- Ames, Mary. From a New England woman's diary in Dixie in 1865. Plimpton Press, 1906.
- Billingsley, Andrew. Yearning to breathe free: Robert Smalls of South Carolina and his families. Univ of South Carolina Press, 2007.
- Burton, E. Milby. The siege of Charleston, 1861–1865. University of South Carolina Press, 1970.
- Dougherty, Kevin. The Port Royal Experiment: A Case Study in Development. Univ. Press of Mississippi, 2014. – via Project MUSE (subscription required)
- Dyer, F. H. A compendium of the War of the Rebellion, Volume 1. The Dyer publishing company, 1908
- Helsley, Alexia Jones. Wicked Edisto: The Dark Side of Eden. Arcadia Publishing, 2014
- Hess, Earl J. Field Armies and Fortifications in the Civil War: The Eastern Campaigns, 1861–1864. Univ of North Carolina Press, 2006. – via Project MUSE (subscription required)
- Moore, Frank, Everett, Edward. The Rebellion Record: A Diary of American Events. Edited by Frank Moore. Vol. 4. GP Putnam, 1864.
- Scarborough, William Kauffman. Masters of the Big House: Elite Slaveholders of the Mid-Nineteenth-Century South. LSU Press, 2006. – via Project MUSE (subscription required)
- Silverman, Jason H., Samuel N. Thomas, and Beverly Daniel Evans. Shanks: The Life and Wars of General Nathan George Evans, CSA. Da Capo Press, 2002.
- Spencer, Charles. Edisto Island, 1861 to 2006: Ruin, Recovery and Rebirth. Arcadia Publishing, 2008.
- Stone, H. David. Vital Rails: The Charleston & Savannah Railroad and the Civil War in Coastal South Carolina. Univ of South Carolina Press, 2008.
- Tomblin, Barbara. Bluejackets and Contrabands: African Americans and the Union Navy. University Press of Kentucky, 2009. – via Project MUSE (subscription required)
- Westwood, Howard and Simon, John. Black Troops, White Commanders and Freedmen During the Civil War. SIU Press, 1991. – via Project MUSE (subscription required)
