= Andrew John Henry Way =

American painter

Bunch of Grapes
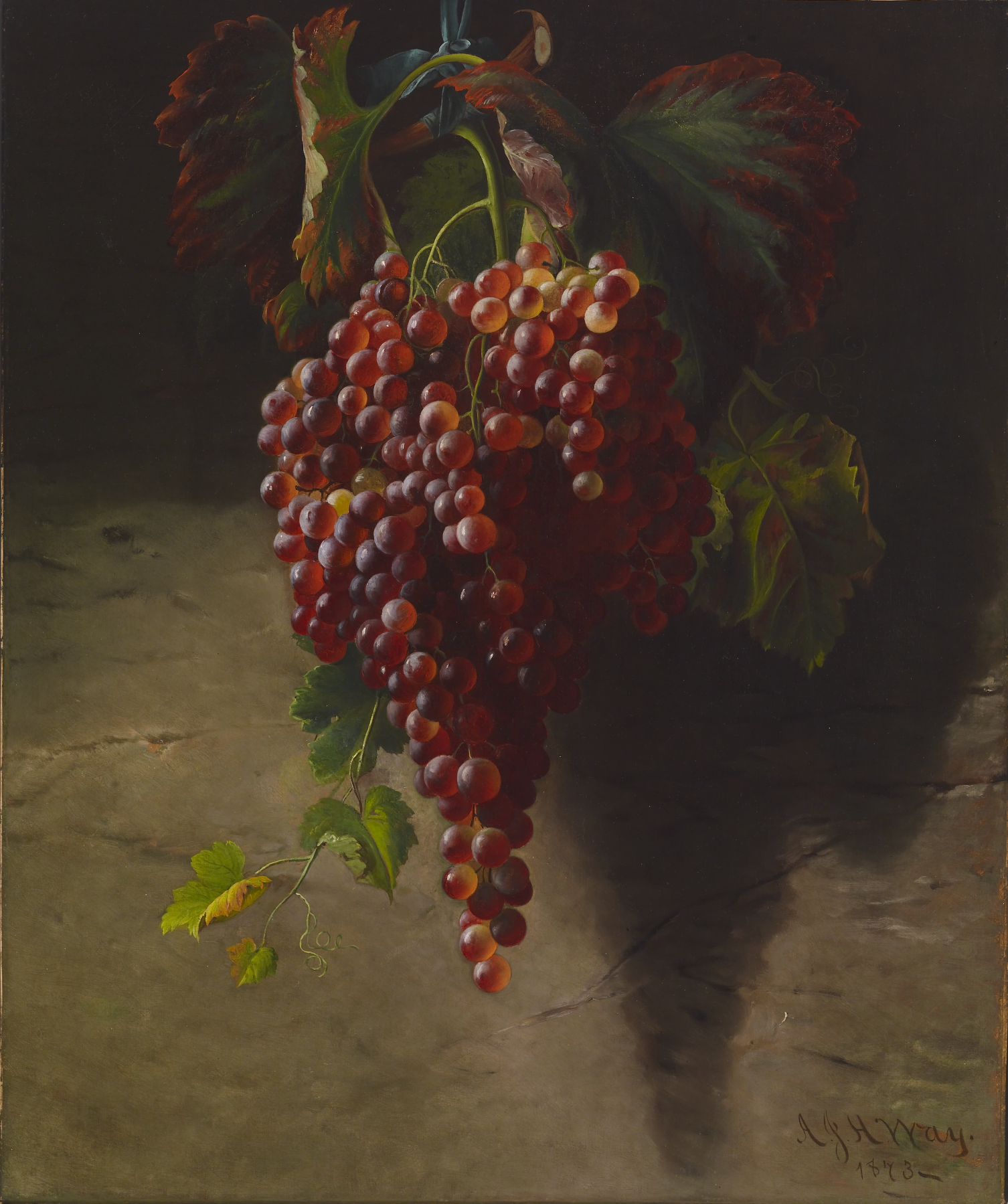
- Artist: Andrew John Henry Way
- Year: 1873
- Medium: Oil on Canvas
- Dimensions: 105.4 cm × 91.4 cm (41.5 in × 36.0 in)
- Location: The Walters Art Museum, Baltimore

Andrew John Henry Way (1826-1888) was a portraitist and still life painter. He was born in 1826 in Washington, D.C. He died in 1888 in Baltimore, Maryland.

== Life and career ==
Way studied with artists John P. Frankenstein and Alfred J. Miller in the U.S. In 1850 he went to Europe and studied in both Paris and Florence. In 1859 he gained the attention of Emanuel Leutze and thereafter changed his focus to still life painting instead of portraits. In 1876, Way received a medal for excellence at the Centennial Exposition.

In 1866, the art collector William Thompson Walters acquired property on Woodburne Ave near Govanstown (later became Saint Mary's). Walters was interested in growing grapes, and hired Andrew John Henry Way to paint a cluster of Prince Albert grapes. The painting, Bunch of Grapes, is currently on view at The Walters Art Museum in Baltimore.

A private scrapbook of Way's, housed at the South Carolina Historical Society, includes clippings from Baltimore newspapers about the Southern artist William Aiken Walker. Walker was known for painting African Americans after the Civil War. Way also completed small paintings of African Americans.
