= Engagements at Pineberry, Willtown, and White Point =

Battle of the American Civil War

Battle of the Pineberry Battery
- Part of the American Civil War
Date	April 29, 1862
Location	Charleston County, South Carolina 32°40′54″N 80°24′54″W

Belligerents
United States (Union)	Confederate States

Commanders and leaders
Lt Alexander C. Rhind	BG Nathan George Evans, Captain Walter

Units involved
USS E. B. Hale, sailors and one howitzer from the USS Crusader	1 field battery, detachment of Washington Artillery, 2 companies of infantry

Strength
1 gunboat, 22 sailors landing party, howitzer	two 24-pounder guns, 6 more field guns, 2 companies infantry

Casualties and losses
None	None
- Location within South Carolina Engagements at Pineberry, Willtown, and White Point (the United States)

The Battle of The Pineberry Battery (or Engagements at Pineberry, Willtown, and White Point) was a series of minor engagements, fought April 29, 1862, in Charleston County, South Carolina, during the American Civil War. The engagements proceeded from an attack by the Union Navy on a battery on John Berkeley Grimball's plantation on Edisto Island. After successfully destroying the battery, the ship was attacked twice by Confederate artillery forces before returning to its station. The attack was a part of Union efforts to secure Edisto Island, which housed a large colony of escaped African Americans and served as a launching point of a campaign against Charleston.

== Background ==
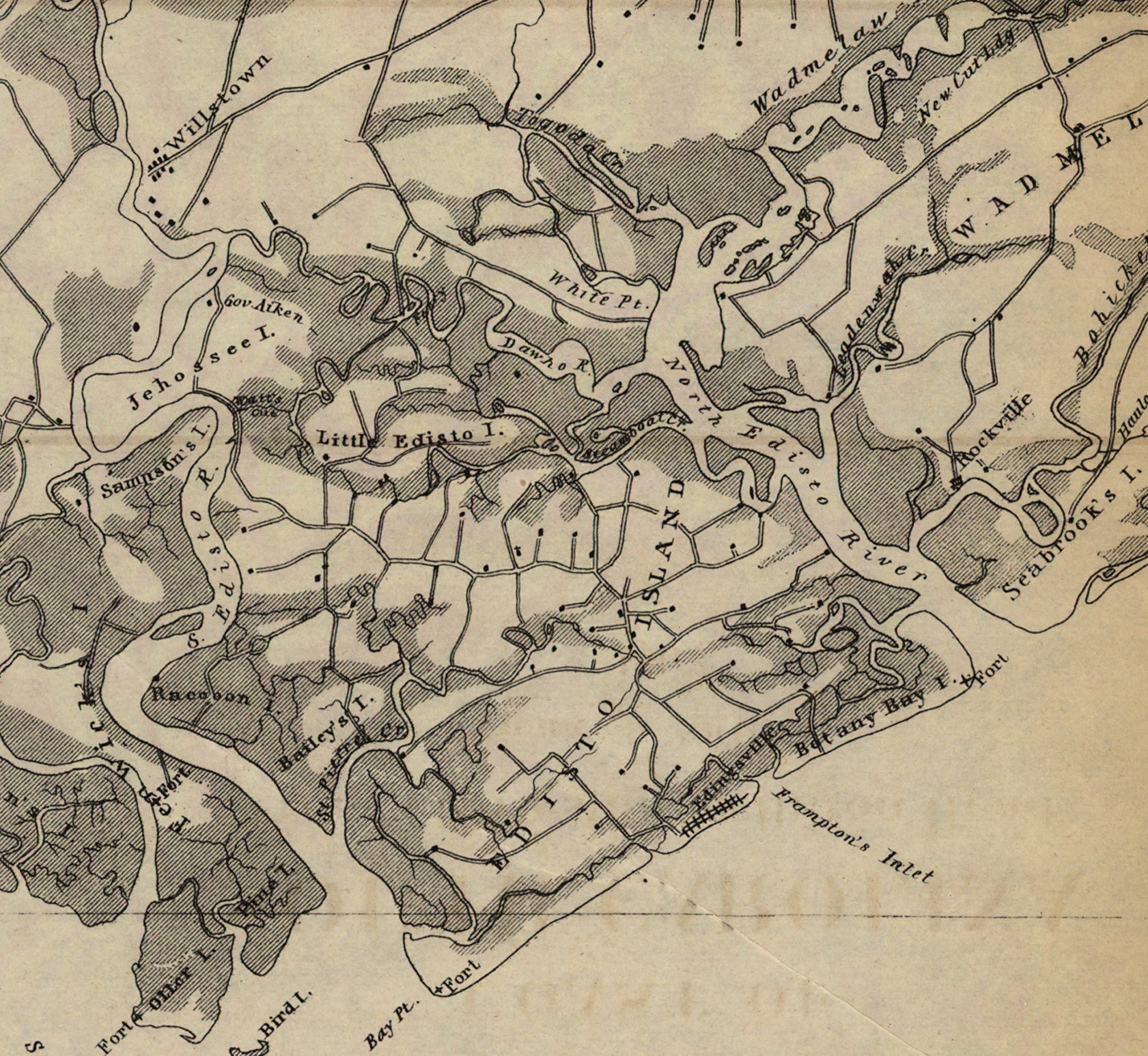
1862 United States Coast Survey map of the Coast of South Carolina from Charleston to Hilton Head cropped to show Edisto Island, White Point, the Dawhoo River, and Willstown.

Edisto Island was largely abandoned by planters in November 1861 and in December 1861, escaped slaves began setting up their own refugee camps there. In January 1862, armed blacks from the island and Confederate forces clashed and a Confederate raid in reprisal killed a small number of unarmed blacks. In February, Union forces were stationed on the island to develop it as a staging area for future campaigns against Charleston, twenty-five miles away, as well as to protect the colony, which would eventually number thousands of blacks. As Union forces took control of the island, a number of skirmishes occurred, and Confederates withdrew. Pineberry Battery was further up the Edisto River from the island, which was one likely path for a land campaign against Charleston. Among the actions, on March 18, Pineberry Battery opened fire on a Union Naval reconnaissance. The Pineberry Battery was on the Pineberry plantation on Edisto Island owned by John Berkeley Grimball.

== Battle ==
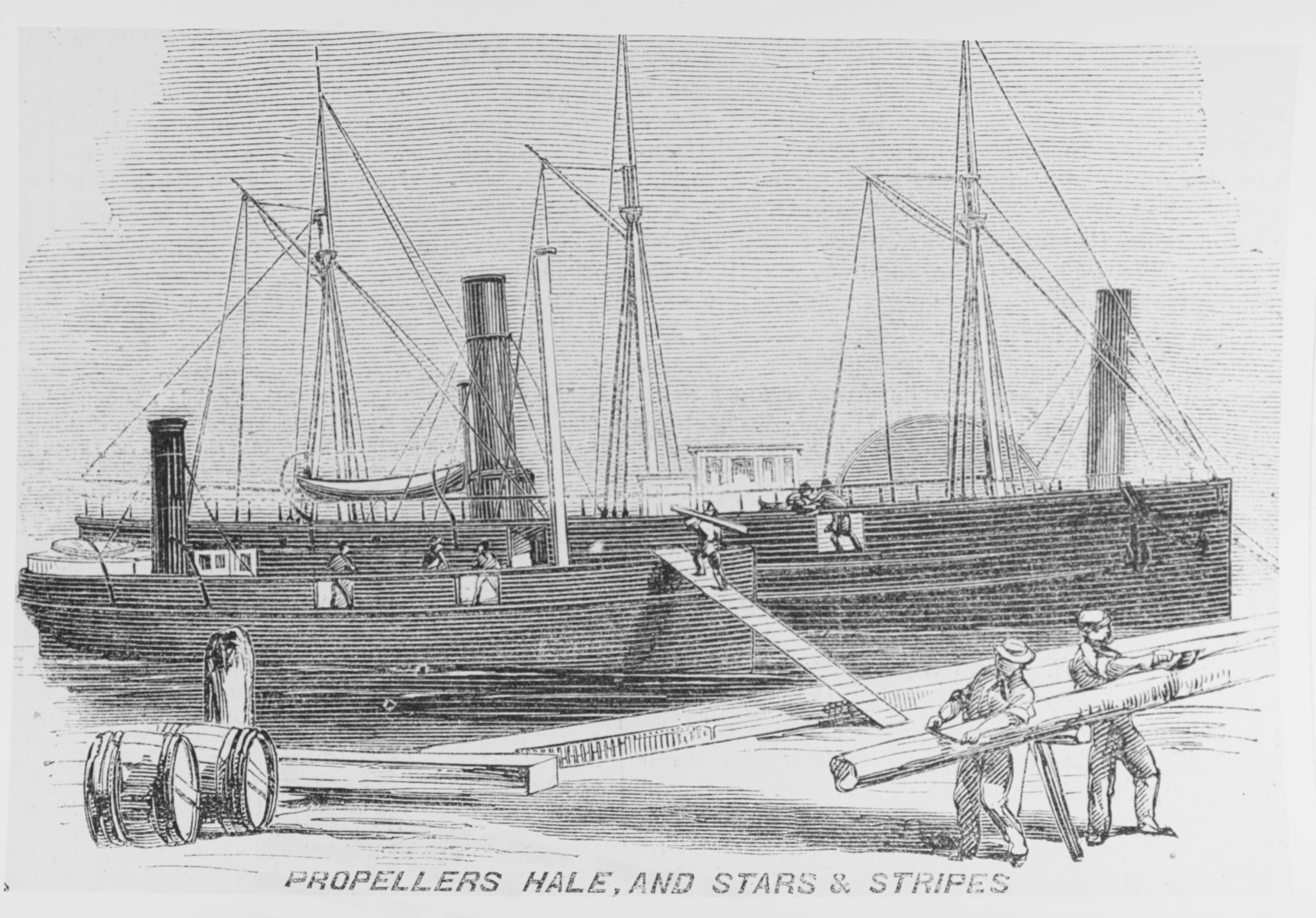
The steamers E.B. Hale and Stars & Stripes fitting out at the New York Navy Yard during the summer of 1861

On April 29, a union expeditionary force in the gunboat USS E. B. Hale and with twenty-two men from the USS Crusader along with a flatboat and howitzer also from the Crusader travelled up the North Edisto River to the Dawhoo River to attack a confederate Battery on the Pineberry plantation. The attack was led by Lieutenant Alexander C. Rhind, who was anxious to show his mettle to Flag Officer Samuel F. Du Pont. The Hale was a freighter which had been converted to a gunboat and mounted four 32-pounder smoothbore cannon and was commanded by Lieutenant James H. Gillis. The ship arrived near the Confederate battery of two 24-pounder guns in the late afternoon and exchanged artillery fire. Commander Du Pont reported that the Confederates continued fire from their field guns while the Hale traveled down the windy river, but fled when the ship came close. Rhind sent Gillis ashore with 22 men who spiked the guns, burned and destroyed the carriages, and captured the powder. The engagement lasted about four hours.

Evans had received intelligence of the attack and led a detachment of six guns of the Washington Artillery under Captain Walter to the place. Two guns attempted to relieve the force at Pineberry but were too late. The remaining four guns set an ambush at a place called White Point. Two companies of infantry accompanied the guns at White Point. The Union forces continued on up the Pon Pon or South Edisto River to make an attack on a schooner in that direction, but Evans met them with two pieces of field artillery near Willstown. Union forces then returned to their gunboat and continued back down the Dawhoo River. The ship was ambushed by the four artillery guns and by small arms at White Point near Slann's Bluff. Rhind stated that he had prepared for this eventuality and returned fire with shell, grape, and canister. The engagement continued there for nearly an hour. Commander Du Pont reported that the Hale returned without a man injured, although one of the Hale's 32-pounder guns was damaged. Confederates also reported no losses. The officers and men of both Union ships earned a commendation from the Secretary of the Navy for their courageous conduct.

== Aftermath ==
On June 2, Horatio Wright's division embarked from Edisto Island on Hunter's planned campaign which would lead to the Battle of Secessionville on June 16. In the summer of 1862, Union troops protecting coastal colonies began to withdraw to reinforce Union General George B. McClellan who was engaged in the Peninsula Campaign, a series of battle between March and July. Having lost at Secessionville, Hunter withdrew the rest of garrison on Edisto Island on July 11, and the African American colony was moved to St. Helena village

Pineberry Battery was a battery on the prominent John Berkeley Grimball plantation which was heavily affected by the war and well documented in Grimball's diary. Early in the war, by June 1861, seventy slaves on the plantation had fled, and by May 1864, Grimball claimed that damage on the plantation had approached $20,000. Grimball returned to the plantation in 1866, but was unable to pay mortgage payments on half of the plantation.

== Sources ==
- Linder, Suzanne Cameron. Historical Atlas of the Rice Plantations of the ACE River Basin – 1860. Columbia, SC: South Carolina Department of Archives and History, 1995
- Melton, Maurice. The Best Station of Them All: The Savannah Squadron, 1861–1865. University of Alabama Press, 2012. – via Project MUSE (subscription required)
- Moore, Frank, Everett, Edward. The Rebellion Record: A Diary of American Events. Edited by Frank Moore. Vol. 4. GP Putnam, 1864.
- Silverman, Jason H., Samuel N. Thomas, and Beverly Daniel Evans. Shanks: The Life and Wars of General Nathan George Evans, CSA. Da Capo Press, 2002.
- Symonds, Craig L. Union Combined Operations in the Civil War. Vol. 33. Fordham Univ Press, 2010. – via Project MUSE (subscription required)
- Tomblin, Barbara. Bluejackets and Contrabands: African Americans and the Union Navy. University Press of Kentucky, 2009. – via Project MUSE (subscription required)
- Trinkley, Michael and Fick, Sarah. A Survey of Civil War Fortifications in Charleston, Beaufort, Berkeley, Hampton, and Jasper Counties, South Carolina, Volume 1. Chicora Foundation, 2000
- Tucker, Spencer C., ed. American Civil War: The Definitive Encyclopedia and Document Collection [6 volumes]: The Definitive Encyclopedia and Document Collection. ABC-CLIO, 2013.
- Williamson, Joel. After Slavery: The Negro in South Carolina During Reconstruction, 1861–1877. Chapel Hill: The University of North Carolina Press, 1965.
- Woodward, Colin Edward. Marching Masters: Slavery, Race, and the Confederate Army During the Civil War. University of Virginia Press, 2014. – via Project MUSE (subscription required)
- The Union Army: Cyclopedia of Battles. Federal Publishing Company, 1908
- Report of the Secretary of the Navy, with an Appendix containing Reports from Officers, December 1862. Government Printing Office, Washington DC. 1863
- The War of the Rebellion: A Compilation of the Official Records of the Union and Confederate Armies. U.S. Government Printing Office, Washington DC. 1885
