= List of shipwrecks in August 1861 =

The list of shipwrecks in August 1861 includes ships sunk, foundered, grounded, or otherwise lost during August 1861.

== 1 August ==
List of shipwrecks: 1 August 1861
Ship	State	Description
Julia Moffitt	United States	The 56-ton sternwheel paddle steamer burned at Tyler, West Virginia.
Kanawha Valley	United States	American Civil War: The 126-ton sternwheel paddle steamer was burned by Union forces at Cannelton, Virginia, Confederate States of America. Confederate gunfire from shore killed one person on board.
Vibelia	United Kingdom	The ship was driven ashore at Berdyansk, Russia. She was refloated on 3 August.

== 2 August ==
List of shipwrecks: 2 August 1861
Ship	State	Description
Britannia	United Kingdom	The sloop collided with a brig and was damaged. She was consequently beached at Sea Palling, Norfolk. Her crew were rescued. Britannia was on a voyage from Sunderland, County Durham to Woodbridge, Suffolk. She was a total loss.
Camboo	Hudson's Bay Company	The steamship was destroyed by a boiler explosion at Victoria, Colony of British Columbia with the loss of at least seven lives.
Stag Hound	United States	The clipper was destroyed by fire in the Atlantic Ocean 45 nautical miles (83 kilometres) south of Pernambuco, Brazil. Her entire crew made it to shore safely in her boats. She was on a voyage from Sunderland to San Francisco, California.

== 3 August ==
List of shipwrecks: 3 August 1861
Ship	State	Description
Colina	United Kingdom	The barque ran aground off Olina, Brazil. She was on a voyage from Pernambuco, Brazil to Valparaíso, Chile.
HMS Driver	Royal Navy	The paddle sloop-of-war was wrecked on Mayaguana, Bahamas. She was on a voyage from Bermuda to Jamaica.
Gipsey Queen	United Kingdom	The steamship was driven ashore on Gotland, Sweden. She was on a voyage from Kronstadt, Russia to Hartlepool, County Durham. She was refloated with assistance and resumed her voyage, but put in to Burgsvik, Sweden.
Judy	United Kingdom	The schooner ran aground at Torquay, Devon. She was then run into by Philemon (United Kingdom). Judy was on a voyage from Middlesbrough, Yorkshire to Torquay.
Maid of the Mill	United Kingdom	The ship was wrecked on the Swingpitt Sands, in the Thames Estuary. Her crew were rescued by the steamship Metia (United Kingdom). Maid of the Mill was on a voyage from London to Colchester, Essex.
Sapeur Pompier	United Kingdom	The brig was driven ashore at Narva, Russia. She was on a voyage from Bordeaux, Gironde to Kronstadt. She was refloated on 6 July and completed her voyage.

== 4 August ==
List of shipwrecks: 4 August 1861
Ship	State	Description
Bucephalus	(United Kingdom of Great Britain and Ireland) British North America	The ship was driven ashore on Mud Island, Province of Canada. She was consequently condemned.
Galatea	United Kingdom	The brig sprang a leak and was beached at Cromer, Norfolk. She was on a voyage from Sunderland, County Durham to Caen, Calvados, France. She was later refloated and taken in to Great Yarmouth, Norfolk.
William and Jane	United Kingdom	The ship ran aground near the Gom Key Lighthouse, Bahamas. She was on a voyage from Matanzas, Cuba to Falmouth, Cornwall. She had been destroyed by fire by 14 August.

== 5 August ==
List of shipwrecks: 5 August 1861
Ship	State	Description
Alvarado	Confederate States of America	Alvarado, in the distance at left, burns after USS Jamestown, right foreground, ran her ashore. Illustration from Harper's Weekly, 28 September 1861. American Civil War, Union blockade: The bark, taken as a prize by the privateer Jefferson Davis (Confederate States of America) on 21 July 1861, was run ashore and burned by the sloop-of-war USS Jamestown (United States Navy) near Fernandina, Florida.

== 6 August ==
List of shipwrecks: 6 August 1861
Ship	State	Description
Oscar	United Kingdom	The schooner ran aground on Penny Stell, off the coast of Yorkshire. She was on a voyage from Hartlepool, County Durham to London. She was refloated and resumed her voyage.

== 7 August ==
List of shipwrecks: 2 August 1861
Ship	State	Description
Primera de Toraerriga	United Kingdom	The ship ran aground on the Blackwater Bank, in the Irish Sea. Fifteen crew reached land in a boat. One crew member was left on board. She floated off, but was boarded by the crew of the Cahore Lifeboat and was beached at Arklow, County Wicklow. She was on a voyage from Liverpool, Lancashire to Havana, Cuba
Sarah Elizabeth	(United Kingdom of Great Britain and Ireland) New Zealand	The schooner was wrecked when she hit the north spit at the mouth of the Whareama River. She was carrying a cargo of timber from Wellington. Crew and cargo were saved.
Tantivy	United Kingdom	The schooner was wrecked on the Newton Rock, on the coast of Northumberland. Her crew were rescued. She was on a voyage from Newcastle upon Tyne, Northumberland to Dublin. She was refloated on 12 August and taken in to Newton, Northumberland.

== 8 August ==
List of shipwrecks: 8 August 1861
Ship	State	Description
Evangeline	United Kingdom	The barque was destroyed by fire in the Atlantic Ocean. Her ten crew were rescued. She was on a voyage from Jamaica to London.
Justitia	Norway	The barque was wrecked on the Corton Sand, in the North Sea off the coast of Suffolk, United Kingdom. The wreck was subsequently towed in to Harwich, Essex, United Kingdom by Agenoria, John and William, Paragon and Volunteer (all United Kingdom).

== 9 August ==
List of shipwrecks: 9 August 1861
Ship	State	Description
York	Confederate States of America	American Civil War: Pursued by the armed screw steamer USS Union (United States Navy), the 68- or 72-ton schooner, a Confederate privateer, ran aground on the coast of North Carolina on Cape Hatteras near New Inlet. Her crew then threw her guns overboard and burned her to the waterline to prevent her from being captured by the armed screw steamer USS Yankee (United States Navy).

== 10 August ==
List of shipwrecks: 10 August 1861
Ship	State	Description
Armenian	United Kingdom	The steamship ran aground at Lagos, Africa. She was on a voyage from Bonny, Africa to Liverpool, Lancashire. She was refloated with assistance from HMS Brune and HMS Prometheus (both Royal Navy).
Chandos	United Kingdom	The schooner collided with Severn (United Kingdom) and sank in the North Sea off Whitby, Yorkshire. Her crew were rescued. She was on a voyage from Plymouth, Devon to Seaham, County Durham.
Louisa	Confederate States of America	American Civil War, Union blockade: Carrying a cargo of coffee, the 200-ton schooner was run onto a reef off the coast of North Carolina about 3 miles (4.8 km) south of Fort Fisher by the armed screw steamer USS Penguin (United States Navy). Louisa capsized, and the surf quickly broke over her.
Mary Campbell	United Kingdom	The ship ran aground on the Holm Sand, in the North Sea off the coast of Suffolk. She was on a voyage from South Shields, County Durham to London. She was refloated and resumed her voyage.
Nieuwendam	Netherlands	The ship was driven ashore at Nyborg, Denmark. She was on a voyage from Cardiff, Glamorgan, United Kingdom to Nyborg.
Pioneer	(United Kingdom of Great Britain and Ireland) New South Wales	The ship was driven ashore on Moreton Island, Queensland.
Sea Foam	Unknown	The 135-ton screw steamer was stranded.

== 11 August ==
List of shipwrecks: 11 August 1861
Ship	State	Description
John Carver	United States	American Civil War: The ship was captured and burned by Privateer "Jefferson Davis" (Confederate States of America) at (29°51′N 67°50′W).
Tam o'Shanter	United Kingdom	The barque caught fire in the Atlantic Ocean and was abandoned. Her crew were rescued by Wings of the Morning (United Kingdom).

== 12 August ==
List of shipwrecks: 12 August 1861
Ship	State	Description
Carrier	United States	The 345-ton sidewheel paddle steamer sank in the Missouri River at St. Charles, Missouri.
Mary	United Kingdom	The ship ran aground at Whitby, Yorkshire. She was on a voyage from Quebec City, Province of Canada, British North America to Whitby.
Temisconata	United Kingdom	The brig was driven ashore and wrecked at Algeciras. She was on a voyage from Tarragona, Spain to Liverpool, Lancashire.

== 13 August ==
List of shipwrecks: 13 August 1861
Ship	State	Description
Gipsy Lass	United Kingdom	The ship ran aground at Whitby, Yorkshire. She was on a voyage from King's Lynn, Norfolk to Stockton-on-Tees, County Durham.
Isabel	Confederate States of America	American Civil War, Union blockade: Carrying passengers, the 30-ton schooner was captured and destroyed in Atchafalaya Bay in Louisiana by the armed screw steamer USS Huntsville (United States Navy).
Rauhan	Flag unknown	The schooner was driven ashore near "Alimye", Denmark. She was on a voyage from "Ranmo" to London, United Kingdom.
Morning Star	United Kingdom	The brig was wrecked on Gotland, Sweden. Her ten crew were rescued. She was on a voyage from Sunderland, County Durham to Kronstadt, Russia.

== 14 August ==
List of shipwrecks: 14 August 1861
Ship	State	Description
Diana	United Kingdom	The ship ran aground on The Shingles, off the Isle of Wight. She was on a voyage from the River Tyne to Teignmouth, Devon. She was refloated and resumed her voyage.
Gulnare	United Kingdom	The ship was lost off "Holmen". She was on a voyage from South Shields, County Durham to Gothenburg, Sweden.
Linea	United Kingdom	The barque was wrecked. Her crew were rescued. She was on a voyage from Jamaica to London.
Ranger	United Kingdom	The ship foundered off Ouessant, Finistère, France. Her crew were rescued. She was on a voyage from "Requijada" to Antwerp, Belgium.
Temeseonata	United Kingdom	The ship was wrecked near Tarifa, Spain. She was on a voyage from Barcelona, Spain to Liverpool, Lancashire.

== 15 August ==
List of shipwrecks: 15 August 1861
Ship	State	Description
Ann and Margaret	United Kingdom	The schooner struck the Sledges and was damagaed. She was on a voyage from Ardrossan, Ayrshire to Rouen, Seine-Inférieure. She put in to "Perihguen", France in a leaky condition.
Argentine	United Kingdom	1861 Hurricane No. 2:The barque was wrecked on the Florida Reef near the Carysfort Lighthouse with the loss of five of her twelve crew. She was on a voyage from Cardenas, Cuba to Greenock, Renfrewshire.
Banshee	United Kingdom	The sloop ran aground on the Bembridge Ledge, off the Isle of Wight. She was on a voyage from Newcastle upon Tyne, Northumberland to Youghal, County Cork. She was refloated.
Coriolanus	United Kingdom	The ship was driven ashore at the South Lighthouse, Belfast, County Antrim and was abandoned by her 28 crew, at least nine of whom subsequently perished. She was on a voyage from Liverpool, Lancashire to Quebec City, Province of Canada, British North America. Declared a total loss, she floated off on 18 August and sank.
J. Appleton	United States	1861 Hurricane No. 2: Carrying a cargo of water, the 1,200-ton schooner parted her cable during a gale and was driven ashore 30 feet (9.1 meters) above the low waterline near Egmont Key Light on Egmont Key in Florida. Her wreck was stripped and burned.
Malvina	France	1861 Hurricane No. 2: The sailing ship ran ground on Pine Key and was wrecked, or on Knight's Key and was damaged but possibly saved.
Panuco	United Kingdom	The schooner foundered off the Rinns of Orsay Lighthouse, Orsay, Inner Hebrides. Her crew were rescued. She was on a voyage from Caernarfon to Hamburg.
Queen of the Wave	United Kingdom	The barque was wrecked at Ganjam, India. Her seventeen crew were rescued. She was on a voyage from Madras to Ganjam.
Sir Walter Raleigh	United Kingdom	1861 Hurricane No. 2:The ship was wrecked on Pacific Reef near Cosco Creek, Florida, Confederate States of America with the loss of eleven of her sixteen crew. Survivors were subsequently rescued by boats from Prima Donna (United Kingdom), which had herself been wrecked.

== 16 August ==
List of shipwrecks: 16 August 1861
Ship	State	Description
Eliza Ann	Unknown	1861 Hurricane No. 2:The vessel was wrecked 7 miles west of Bahia Honda Key in 1 1/2 feet of water.
Emerald Isle	United Kingdom	1861 Hurricane No. 2:The barque was wrecked on Matacombe Key. She was on a voyage from Key West, Florida, Confederate States of America to London.
George Leslie	United States	1861 Hurricane No. 2:The Barque was wrecked on the upper end of Alligator Reef and went to pieces.
Huntingdon	United Kingdom	The ship was wrecked at Point Brava, Uruguay. Her crew were rescued.
Jane Wright	United States	American Civil War: During a voyage from Washington, to St. Mary's County, Maryland, the sloop was scuttled in the Chesapeake Bay at the mouth of the Potomac River off Smith Point, Virginia, by the armed tug USS Yankee (United States Navy) to prevent Confederate forces from commandeering her for use in a rumored invasion of Maryland.
Ornate	Nova Scotia	1861 Hurricane No. 2:The Brig was wrecked on the Crocus Reef with the loss of five lives. She was on a voyage from Cienfuegos, Cuba to Boston, Massachusetts United States.
Prima Donna	United Kingdom	1861 Hurricane No. 2:The barque was wrecked 20 nautical miles (37 km) north of Cape Florida, Florida. Her crew survived. She was on a voyage from Havana, Cuba to New York, United States.

== 17 August ==
List of shipwrecks: 17 August 1861
Ship	State	Description
Britannia	United Kingdom	The brig ran aground on the Patch Sand. She was on a voyage form South Shields, County Durham to Shoreham-by-Sea, Sussex. She was refloated the next day and resumed her voyage.
Cora Linn	United Kingdom	The steamship ran aground on the Cabadilla Rocks, off Porto, Portugal. She was on a voyage from the Clyde to Porto.
Maid of Erin	United Kingdom	The ship ran aground on the Patch Sand. She was on a voyage from Newcastle upon Tyne to Folkestone, Kent. She was refloated the next day.

== 18 August ==
List of shipwrecks: 18 August 1861
Ship	State	Description
Jefferson Davis	Confederate States of America	American Civil War: The brig, operating as a Confederate privateer, was wrecked without loss of life on a shoal while entering port at St. Augustine, Florida, during a half-gale.
Phillyra	United Kingdom	The ship was wrecked at Crow Head, County Cork. Her crew were rescued. She was on a voyage from Cardiff, Glamorgan to Limerick.

== 19 August ==
List of shipwrecks: 19 August 1861
Ship	State	Description
Ammirabile Colombo	France	The ship ran aground at Dunkirk, Nord. She was on a voyage from Taganrog, Russia to Dunkirk.
Elizabeth	United Kingdom	The schooner collided with the brigantine Amazon ( (United Kingdom of Great Britain and Ireland) British North America) and foundered in the English Channel off Folkestone, Kent. Her crew were rescued by Amazon. Elizabeth was on a voyage from South Shields, County Durham to Emsworth, Hampshire.
Mary Ann	United Kingdom	The ship ran aground at the mouth of the Bassein River. She was on a voyage from Colombo, Ceylon to Akyab, Burma.
Nordeap	Norway	The brig ran aground at Narva, Russia.
Steadfast	United Kingdom	The ship ran aground at Youghal, County Cork. She was on a voyage from Youghal to Cardiff, Glamorgan. She was refloated and resumed her voyage.
Tellula	United Kingdom	The ship brig was driven ashore at Fleetwood, Lancashire.

== 20 August ==
List of shipwrecks: 20 August 1861
Ship	State	Description
Euphrasie	Belgium	The ship was wrecked near Lemvig, Denmark. Her crew were rescued. She was on a voyage from Antwerp to Danzig.
Euroclydon	United Kingdom	The ship capsized at Sunderland, County Durham. She was righted.
Jones Brothers	United Kingdom	The brig capsized at Newport, Monmouthshire.
Lady Campbell	United Kingdom	The ship was driven against the pier and severely damaged at Dieppe, Seine-Inférieure, France.
R. W. Powell	Confederate States of America	The 349-ton sidewheel paddle steamer struck a snag and sank in the Mississippi River at Plaquemine, Louisiana.
Shark	United Kingdom	The ship was wrecked at the mouth of the Congo River, Africa. Her crew survived. The wreck was plundered by the local inhabitants.
T. W. Riley	United States	American Civil War: The sloop was scuttled at Wades Bay off the Virginia shoreline of the Potomac River by the armed tug USS Yankee and the bark USS Restless (both United States Navy) to prevent her use by Confederate forces in a rumored invasion of Maryland.

== 22 August ==
List of shipwrecks: 22 August 1861
Ship	State	Description
Phillyra	United Kingdom	The ship was wrecked at Crow Head. She was on a voyage from Cardiff, Glamorgan to Limerick.

== 23 August ==
List of shipwrecks: 23 August 1861
Ship	State	Description
Aid	Confederate States of America	American Civil War, Union blockade: The 100-ton schooner or full-rigged ship (sources disagree) was sunk as a blockship by Union forces off the coast of Florida to block the pass at the east end of Santa Rosa Island. She had been captured off Mobile, Alabama, on 5 June by a boat expedition from the screw frigate USS Niagara (United States Navy).
Sarah Ellen	United Kingdom	The ship was driven ashore in Dingle Bay. She was on a voyage from Castlemaine, County Kerry to Gloucester. She was later refloated and put in to Killorglin, County Kerry in a severely leaky condition.

== 24 August ==
List of shipwrecks: 24 August 1861
Ship	State	Description
William Nickela	United States	The ship was driven ashore in the Strait of Canso.
Unnamed	United Kingdom	The schooner foundered in the Humber with the loss of all hands.

== 25 August ==
List of shipwrecks: 25 August 1861
Ship	State	Description
Ceylon	United Kingdom	The ship was abandoned in the Dogger Bank. Her crew were rescued. She was on a voyage from the River Wear to Kronstadt, Russia.
Charles Wood	United Kingdom	The schooner was driven ashore and wrecked at Derbyhaven, Isle of Man. She was on a voyage from Liverpool, Lancashire to Nantes, Loire-Inférieure, France. She was refloated on 2 September.
Glenalm	United Kingdom	The ship was driven ashore at Cochin, India. She was on a voyage from Cochin to London. She was refloated and put back to Cochin.
J. A. McClennan (or J. A. McClelland)	Unknown	The 73-ton sternwheel paddle steamer sank in the Sacramento River in California one to three miles (1.6 to 4.8 km) below Knight's Landing 15 minutes after her boiler exploded, blowing her pilot 200 feet (61 meters) into the air and killing 25 people. The boiler landed on shore 350 yards (320 meters) away. She was refloated, repaired, and returned to service.

== 26 August ==
List of shipwrecks: 26 August 1861
Ship	State	Description
Barnstaple	United Kingdom	The ship was driven ashore and wrecked at Watermouth, Devon.
Francois and Marie	France	The ship ran aground and Great Yarmouth, Norfolk and was severely damaged.
Juno	United Kingdom	The ship ran aground on the Flemish Banks, in the North Sea off the coast of Nord, France and was abandoned by her crew. She was on a voyage from London to Dunkirk, Nord. She was refloated but consequently sank.
Success	United Kingdom	The ship caught fire in the East River, New York. The fire was extinguished with assistance from the ferryboat Manhasset (United States).

== 27 August ==
List of shipwrecks: 27 August 1861
Ship	State	Description
Caroline	United Kingdom	The ship was driven ashore at Lowestoft, Suffolk. She was on a voyage from Newcastle upon Tyne, Northumberland to London. She was refloated and taken in to Lowestoft.
Finland	Confederate States of America	American Civil War: The full-rigged ship was captured and burnt by W. S. Montgomery and another steamship (both United States) at Apalachicola, Florida.
Lady Jocelyn	United Kingdom	The brig ran aground on the Droogden, in the Baltic Sea. She was on a voyage from Kronstadt, Russia to Great Yarmouth, Norfolk. She was refloated the next day and resumed her voyage.
May	United States	The 43-ton sidewheel paddle steamer collided with Major Reybold (flag unknown) and sank at Philadelphia, Pennsylvania.

== 28 August ==
List of shipwrecks: 29 August 1861
Ship	State	Description
Gaidamak (Гайдамак)	Imperial Russian Navy	The steam clipper was driven ashore and beached at ru:Due, Sakhalin. She was refloated on 23 September, but re-beached and later pulled ashore due to her circumstances. Refloated again on 30 May 1862, she was taken in to De-Kastri. Subsequently repaired and returned to service.
Goldseeker	United Kingdom	The lugger sank in a squall off the coast of County Dublin with the loss of six of her eight crew. She was on a voyage from Kingstown to Howth.
Jeune Alphonse	Belgium	The ship was driven ashore on Vlieland, Friesland, Netherlands. She was on a voyage from Dram, Norway to Antwerp.
Prowler	United Kingdom	The tug ran aground in Carnarvon Bay. She was refloated in mid-September and taken in to Holyhead, Anglesey.
Telemaco	Russia	The steamship foundered west of Málaga, Spain with the loss of all but one of her crew.
USS Monticello	United States Navy	American Civil War, Battle of Hatteras Inlet Batteries: The gunboat ran aground off Cape Hatteras, North Carolina, Confederate States of America. She was later refloated.
Eight unidentified vessels	Confederate States of America	American Civil War, Union blockade: Six small boats and two scows were burned along the coast of Maryland by a launch from the armed tug USS Satellite (United States Navy).

== 29 August ==
List of shipwrecks: 29 August 1861
Ship	State	Description
Finland	Confederate States of America	American Civil War, Union blockade: The blockade runner was captured and burned in Apalachicola Bay off the coast of Florida by the armed screw steamer USS R. R. Cuyler (United States Navy).
Liberty	United Kingdom	The brig collided with the barque Faithful (United Kingdom) off the coast of County Durham and was run ashore at Tynemouth, Northumberland.

== 30 August ==
List of shipwrecks: 30 August 1861
Ship	State	Description
Albion	United Kingdom	The full-rigged ship sank at "Keelsing", China. Her crew were rescued.
Allison	United Kingdom	The ship foundered in a typhoon off Shanghai, China. Her crew were rescued.

== 31 August ==
List of shipwrecks: 31 August 1861
Ship	State	Description
Charlotte Maria	United Kingdom	The schooner was driven ashore near Jávea, Spain. She was a total loss.
Manna	Denmark	The galeas was driven ashore on the coast of Zealand. She was on a voyage from Newcastle upon Tyne, Northumberland, United Kingdom to Copenhagen.
Four unidentified boats	Confederate States of America	American Civil War: The boats were captured and burned at Ferry Landing in Virginia by the armed tug USS Resolute (United States Navy).
Unidentified vessels	Confederate States of America	American Civil War, Union blockade: Union forces destroyed a large fishing boat, a scow, and seven small boats at the mouth of Aquia Creek in Virginia.

== Unknown date ==
List of shipwrecks: Unknown date August 1861
Ship	State	Description
Albion	United Kingdom	The ship was wrecked 50 nautical miles (93 km) from Cocinada, India before 15 August. She was on a voyage from Madras to Ganjam.
Capital	United Kingdom	The brig was wrecked near Narva, Russia.
Cassandra	United Kingdom	The brig ran aground on the Gunfleet Sand, in the North Sea off the coast of Essex and was subsequently destroyed by fire.
Colleen Bawn	United Kingdom	The ship sprang a leak and was abandoned in the Atlantic Ocean before 7 August. Her twelve crew were rescued by Mende (United States). Colleen Bawn was on a voyage from Sunderland, County Durham to Quebec City, Province of Canada, British North America.
Cosmopolitan	United Kingdom	The ship ran aground in the Yangtze.
Dove	United Kingdom	The transport ship sank off Shoeburyness, Essex. She was refloated on 27 August and towed in to Chatham Dockyard, Kent by the paddle steamer Africa (United Kingdom).
Drusan	Flag unknown	The ship ran aground in the Yangtze.
Emma	United Kingdom	The ship was lost in Chinese waters.
Finchley	United Kingdom	The barque was wrecked near Algeciras, Spain.
Gem	(United Kingdom of Great Britain and Ireland) Jersey	The ship was wrecked between Tangier, Morocco and Ceuta, Spain before 22 August. Her crew were rescued. was on a voyage from Cardiff, Glamorgan to Tarragona, Spain. She
HMS Hecate	Royal Navy	HMS Hecate The Hydra-class sloop was driven ashore east of Cape Flattery, Washington Territory between 15 and 21 August. She was later refloated and returned to service.
Heinrich	Flag unknown	The ship was wrecked north of Rønne, Denmark before 16 August. She was on a voyage from London, United Kingdom to Saint Petersburg, Russia.
HMS Imperieuse	Royal Navy	The frigate ran aground on a rock 140 nautical miles (260 km) from Jeddo, Japan. She was refloated three days later with assistance from HMS Ringdove (Royal Navy).
Lonwood	Confederate States of America	The ship was wrecked off Cape Hatteras, North Carolina. Her crew were rescued. She was on a voyage from Rio de Janeiro, Brazil to New Orleans, Louisiana.
Louisa	Confederate States of America	American Civil War, Union blockade: Fleeing from the armed screw steamer USS Penguin (United States Navy) while trying to run the Union blockade with a cargo of coffee, the 200-ton schooner struck a shoal and capsized in the North Atlantic Ocean near Cape Fear, North Carolina, about 3 miles (4.8 km) south of Fort Fisher on either 10 or 11 August. The surf quickly broke over her.
Manila	Flag unknown	The ship ran aground in the Yangtze.
Mohenie	United States	The schooner went ashore at Cape Sable Island, and became a total loss. Crew saved.
RMS Norwegian	United Kingdom	The ship was driven ashore on Anticosti Island, Nova Scotia, British North America before 5 August. She was on a voyage from Liverpool to Quebec City. She was refloated and resumed her voyage.
Parsee	United Kingdom	The ship ran aground off Cape Hellas. She was on a voyage from London to Patti, Sicily, Italy.
Rajali	Flag unknown	The ship ran aground in the Yangtze.
Testimonial	United Kingdom	The ship was wrecked near Aden with the loss of four of her crew.
