= Thomas A. Budd =

United States Naval officer

Captain Thomas A. Budd
- Born: April 28, 1813; White Hall, New York
- Died: March 22, 1862 (aged 48); Mosquito Inlet, Florida, United States
- Burial place: Buffalo, New York
- Military career
- Allegiance: United States
- Branch: United States Navy
- Service years: 1829–1862
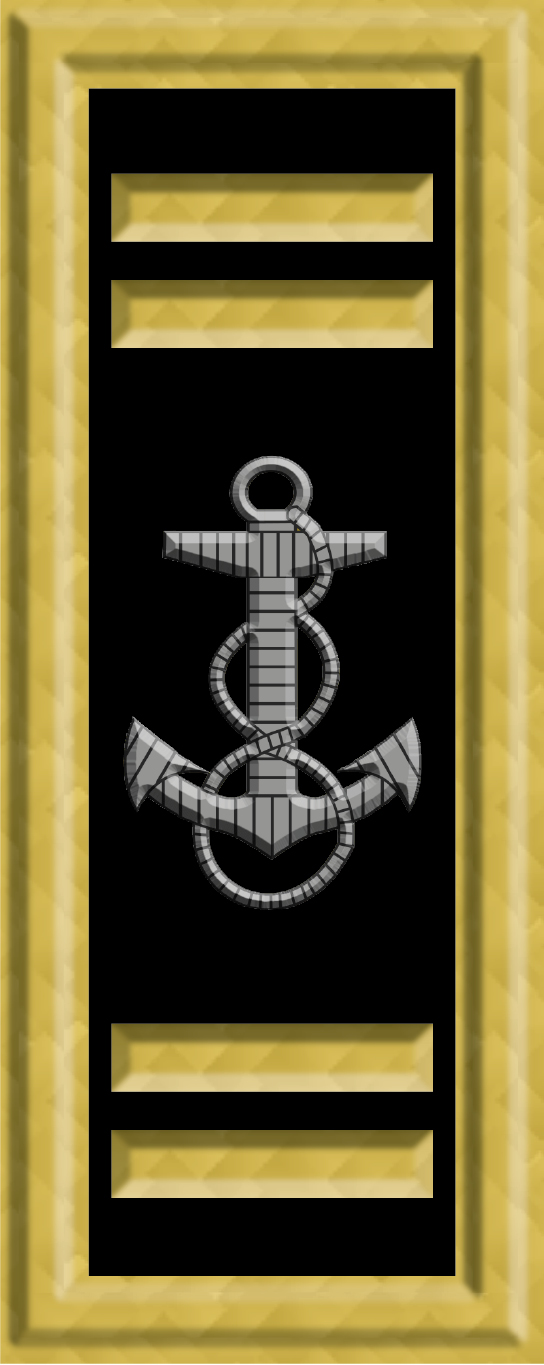
- Rank: Lieutenant
- Commands: USS Penguin
- Conflicts: United States Exploring Expedition; American Civil War

Thomas A. Budd (April 28, 1813 – March 22, 1862) was a United States Naval officer.

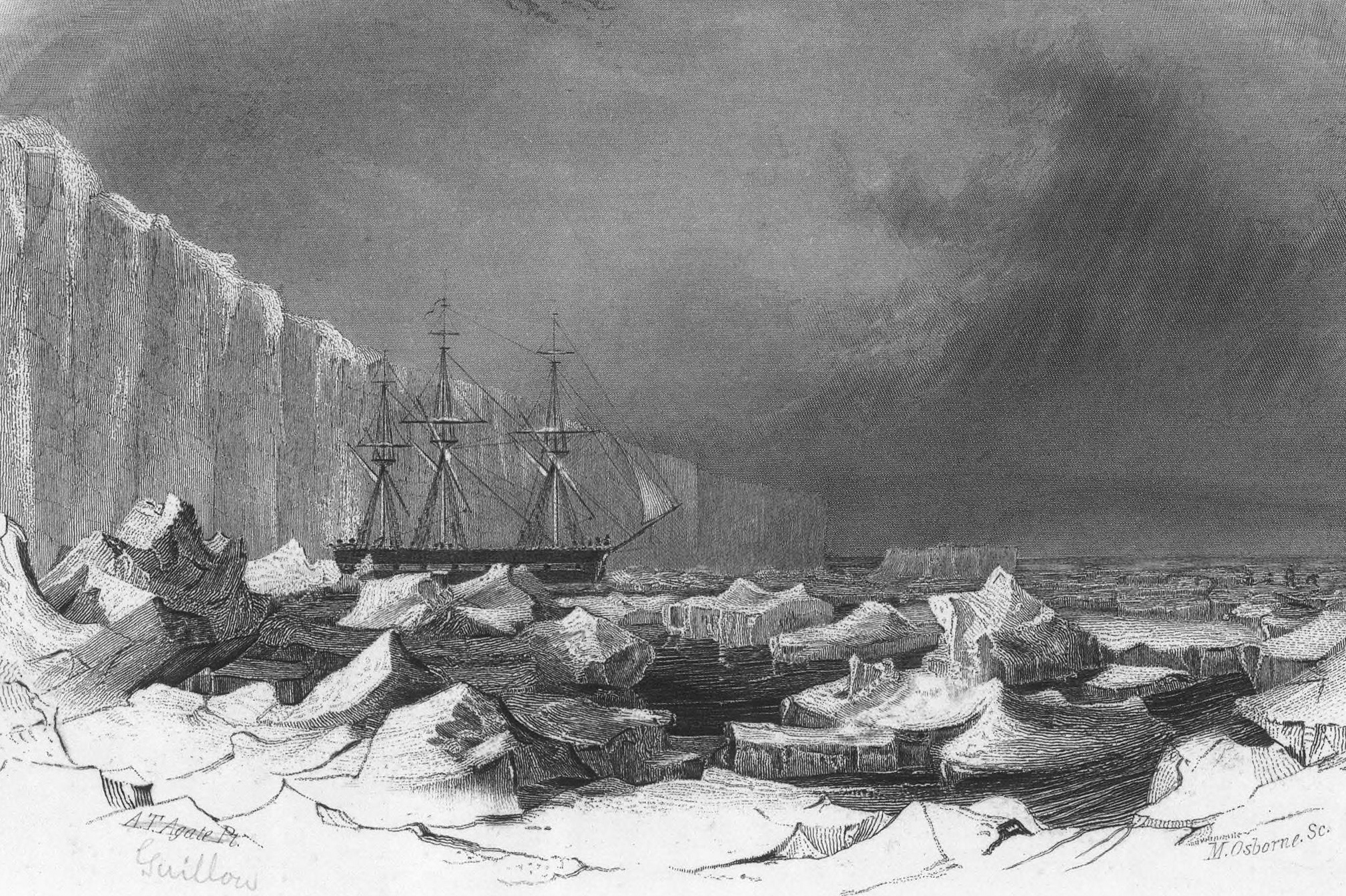
USS Peacock in 1840 while exploring the Antarctic

Budd entered the navy as a midshipman in 1829, was promoted to passed midshipman in 1835, and earned the rank of lieutenant in 1841. Budd was acting master of the USS Peacock during Captain Charles Wilkes United States Exploring Expedition (1838–1842). He later joined the expedition flagship, USS Vincennes, as master. Numerous features were named for Budd during the expedition, including Budd Coast in Antarctica, Budd Inlet, a part of Puget Sound, and Budd's Harbor, later called Washington Harbor, in Sequim Bay, on the Strait of Juan de Fuca.

In the late 1840s, he joined the California Line of the Pacific Mail Steamship Company as commander of the California, serving the line during the peak of the California Gold Rush. In 1848, the California, under command of Captain Cleveland Forbes, became the first American steamship to navigate the Straits of Magellan. Budd was solicited to join Commodore Matthew C. Perry in his Japan Expedition, but resigned before its departure in 1853. He later moved to Buffalo, New York, where he entered into an exchange and brokerage business with Nathan Thayer. In Buffalo, he occasionally contributed articles to the newspaper, Courieron.

Politically, he was a democrat and he opposed abolitionism. At the start of the Civil War, Budd offered his services to the Union and was placed in command of the gunboat USS Penguin. The Penguin was initially a part of the North Atlantic Blockading Squadron, but joined the Potomac Flotilla on August 19, 1861. In October she shifted to the South Atlantic Blockading Squadron. He participated in the bombardment of Hilton Head in November. During that battle, the Penguin was disabled, and Budd ordered that a tug tow the ship into range so that it could continue to bombard the harbor. In December 1861, Budd assisted escaped slaves around Edisto Island, South Carolina, while supporting activities in that area while under the command of Percival Drayton. He was killed in a skirmish at Mosquito Inlet on the east coast of Florida near Smyrna on March 22, 1862. He was buried in Buffalo's Forest Lawn Cemetery.

Budd was married and had children.
