= Long Point Plantation (38CH321) =

Archaeological site in South Carolina, United States

- U.S. National Register of Historic Places
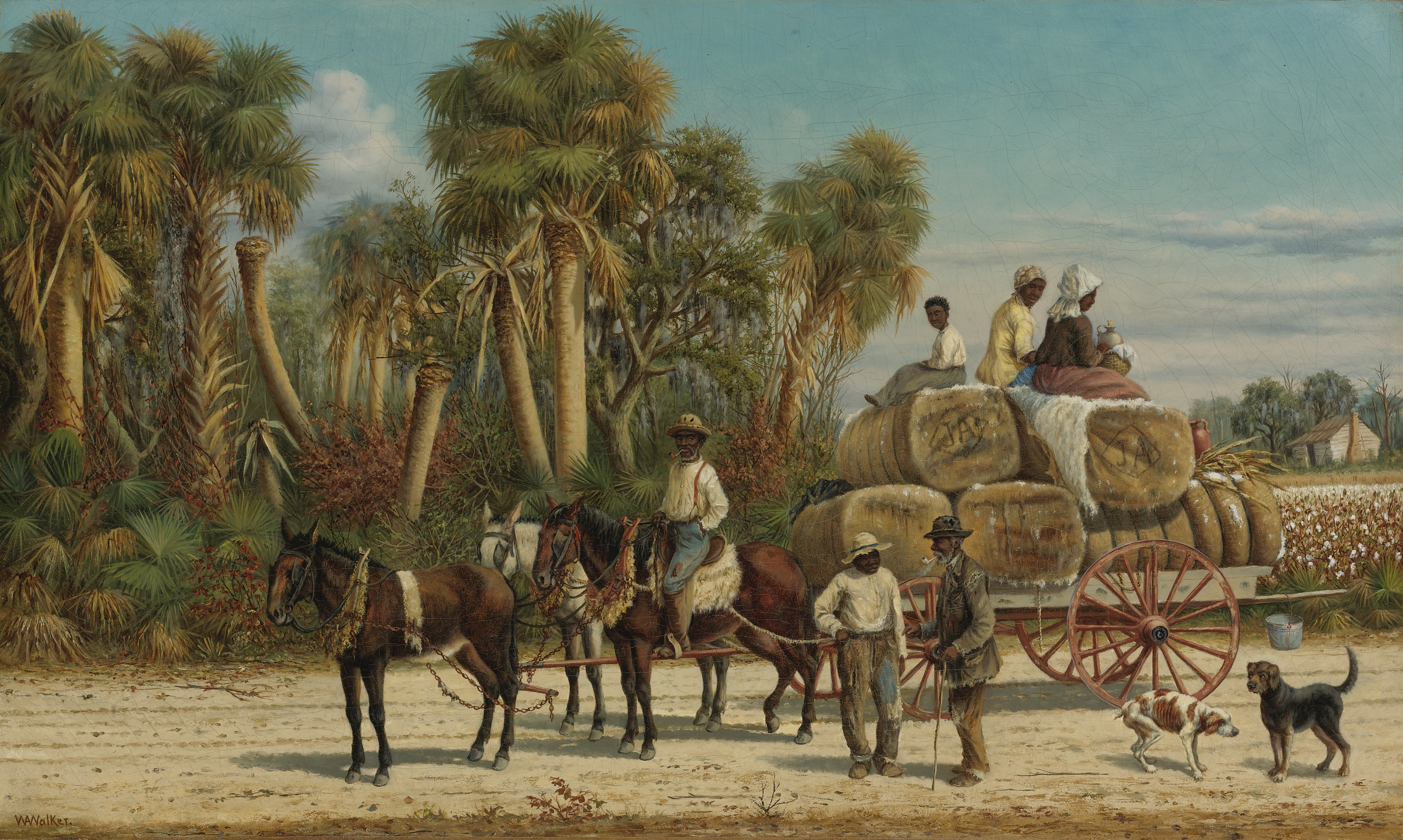
- The plantation has been identified as being the scene of William Aiken Walker's painting, "The Cotton Wagon".
- Nearest city: Mount Pleasant, South Carolina
- Area: 4.7 acres (1.9 ha)
- Built: c. 1719
- Architectural style: I-House
- NRHP reference No.: 86000468
- Added to NRHP: March 20, 1986

Long Point Plantation (38CH321) is a historic plantation site located near Mount Pleasant, Charleston County, South Carolina. The plantation was built sometime between 1719 and 1763, but it came of age during the 19th century. The plantation house and structures were probably built prior to 1763. The plantation was purchased by the prominent Venning family in 1800 and was held by that family until 1899. The main house was apparently razed between 1933 and 1943. One small, brick structure is still standing at the site.

It was listed on the National Register of Historic Places in 1986.
