= William Seabrook House =

Historic house in South Carolina, United States

- U.S. National Register of Historic Places
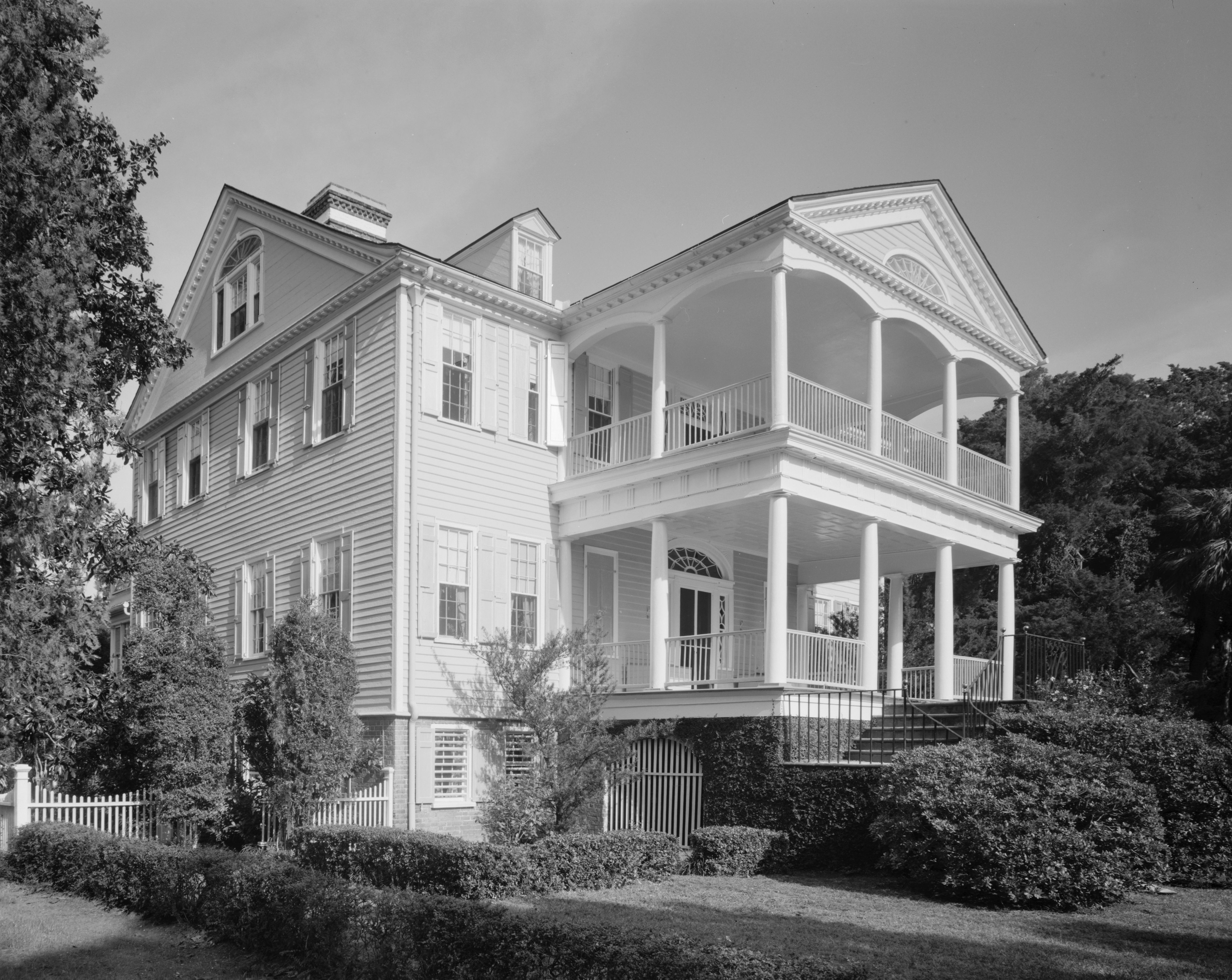
- William Seabrook House in 1978

- Location within South Carolina Location within the United States
- Nearest city: Edisto Island, South Carolina
- Coordinates: 32°36′6″N 80°16′53″W
- Built: 1810
- Architect: Hoban, James
- Architectural style: Early Republic
- NRHP reference No.: 71000758
- Added to NRHP: May 6, 1971

The William Seabrook House, also known as the Seabrook is a plantation house built about 1810 on Edisto Island, South Carolina, United States, southwest of Charleston. It is located off Steamboat Landing Road Extension (South Carolina State Highway 10-768) close to Steamboat Creek about 0.7 mi (1.1 km) from Steam Boat Landing. It was named to the National Register of Historic Places on May 6, 1971.

== History ==
William Seabrook was a Sea Island cotton planter and part-owner of the Edisto Island Ferry, which had a steamboat named the W. Seabrook. The house was built around 1810. His initials are on the ironwork of the front stairs. Tradition indicates that James Hoban, the architect of the White House, was the designer.

William Seabrook died in about 1837. His widow lived in the house until 1854 or 1855. The house was purchased by J. Evans Eddings.

At the end of the Civil War, the Sea Islands below Charleston were abandoned to the Union Army forces. The house was used for staff headquarters and provost. After the war ended, freed slaves temporarily took refuge in the house.

Around 1875 it was sold. At some point, Judge Smith purchased the house. Later, in 1929, the house was bought and restored by Donald D. Dodge.

== Architecture ==
This house has been described as a classic plan for houses on Edisto. It is an Early Republic or Federal style, 2 1/2-story frame house on a raised basement. It has a gabled roof with dormers. It has a double portico with pediment with a semielliptical fanlight, columns, and arched entablature. Double stairways rise to the first floor portico. The main door has sidelights and a semielliptical fanlight. The windows on the main and second floors are nine over nine lights. The house originally had four rooms on the main floor divided by a central hall that extends to the smaller garden portico. Double stairways to the second floor go up a landing over the garden portico door.

Additional pictures are available. A floor plan and photographs taken before its restoration are also available.
