= USS Henry Andrew =

Gunboat of the United States Navy

Coordinates: 36.936°N 76.016°W

History

United States
- Name: USS Henry Andrew
- Launched: 1847
- Acquired: 10 September 1861
- Commissioned: 10 September 1861
- Fate: Wrecked 24 August 1862

General characteristics
- Type: Steamer
- Displacement: 177 long tons (180 t)
- Length: 150 ft (46 m)
- Beam: 26 ft (7.9 m)
- Draft: 7 ft 6 in (2.29 m)
- Propulsion: Steam engine; screw-propelled
- Armament: 2 × 32 pdr (15 kg) guns; 1 × 20 pdr (9.1 kg) gun

USS Henry Andrew was a steamer acquired by the Union navy during the American Civil War. She was used by the Navy to patrol navigable waterways of the Confederacy to prevent the South from trading with other countries.

== Service history ==
Henry Andrew was originally built in 1847 at New York City as a sailing brig, and converted to steam in 1859. She was purchased from her owner, Mr. Van Santvoord, at New York on 10 September 1861. Her first commanding officer was Acting Master Samuel Webb Mather. Assigned to the South Atlantic Blockading Squadron, Henry Andrew arrived on her blockading station in November 1861. She reconnoitered the Vernon River on 11 December, and on 20 December was sent to blockade the entrance to Wassaw Sound. Being of light draft, Henry Andrew was especially valuable in stopping blockade runners and gaining intelligence in the shallow rivers and sounds of the coast. She participated on 17 January-18 February 1862 in an expedition up Wright's and Mud Rivers for the purpose of finding a channel into the Savannah River, encountering no Confederate opposition except a small battery near Red Bluff.

Henry Andrew was reassigned to Fernandina, Florida on 18 March, and took up duties off Fernandina and Mosquito Inlet. Boats from the steamer and Penguin entered Mosquito Inlet on a reconnaissance on 21 March and next day were fired upon by batteries and musketry, killing the captains of both Henry Andrew and Penguin. Subsequently, the ship was active in the blockade off Mosquito Inlet, Stono River, and other points on the coast until sent to Winyah Bay, South Carolina, where she arrived on 21 June. An expedition up the Santee River was organized in late June, and Henry Andrew was designated to accompany it. The ships entered the river on 24 June, reconnoitered the area, and were fired on by shore batteries on the shore. Returning on 3 July, Henry Andrew resumed blockading duties off Stono River until ordered to New York in August for extensive repairs. While steaming north, Henry Andrew encountered heavy weather off Cape Hatteras. She was battered about badly and went ashore south of Cape Henry, Virginia on 24 August 1862. There were no deaths but the ship was a total wreck and was not salvaged.
