= Cassina Point =

Historic house in South Carolina, United States

- U.S. National Register of Historic Places
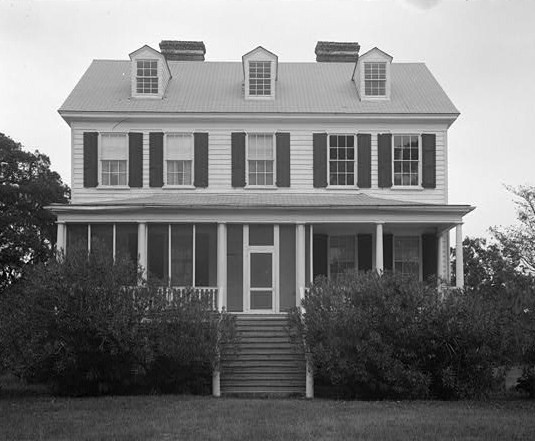
- Cassina Point

- Location within South Carolina Location within the United States
- Location: 1642 Clark Road, Edisto Island, South Carolina
- Coordinates: 32°35′29″N 80°15′03″W
- Built: 1847
- Architectural style: Greek Revival
- NRHP reference No.: 86003210

Cassina Point (also known as the Hopkinson House and Cassina Point Plantation) is a historic house in South Carolina, United States.

Built in 1847 for Carolina Lafayette Seabrook and her husband James Hopkinson, it is a large antebellum house and remnant of a sea island cotton plantation.

Features of the 2 1/2-story, rectangular house include a side-gable roof, pediments, a Flemish bond basement, brick chimneys with stuccoed necking, a roof porch supported by columns, marble mantles, and bull's-eye moulding. The interior of the house was preserved well over the years. The exterior is clad in weatherboard and flushboard. Cassina Point was added to the National Register of Historic Places on November 28, 1986.

== History ==
James Hopkinson was a grandson of Francis Hopkinson, a signer of the Declaration of Independence from New Jersey and designer of the American flag. Carolina Seabrook was the daughter of wealthy Edisto Island planter William Seabrook. William Seabrook had hosted the General Lafayette in 1825 at his nearby home at the time of Carolina's birth. Seabrook gave Lafayette the honor of naming the newborn child, and the general selected Carolina (for the girl's birthplace) and Lafayette (after his own name). When Carolina Seabrook married James Hopkinson, they built Cassina Point on the land given to them by William Seabrook.

During the Civil War, the house was occupied by the Third New Hampshire Volunteer Infantry.

== Gallery ==
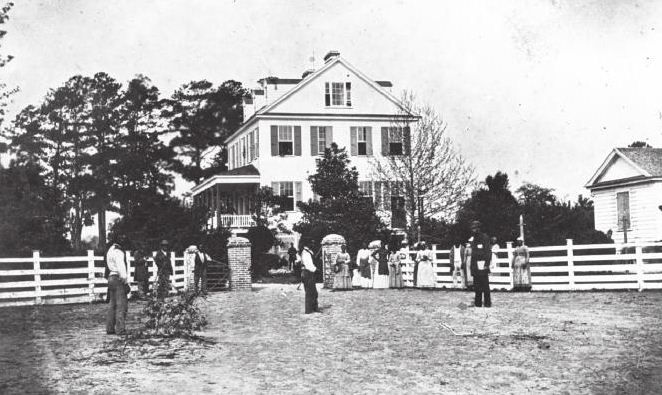
Cassina Point was photographed by a Union soldier in 1862.

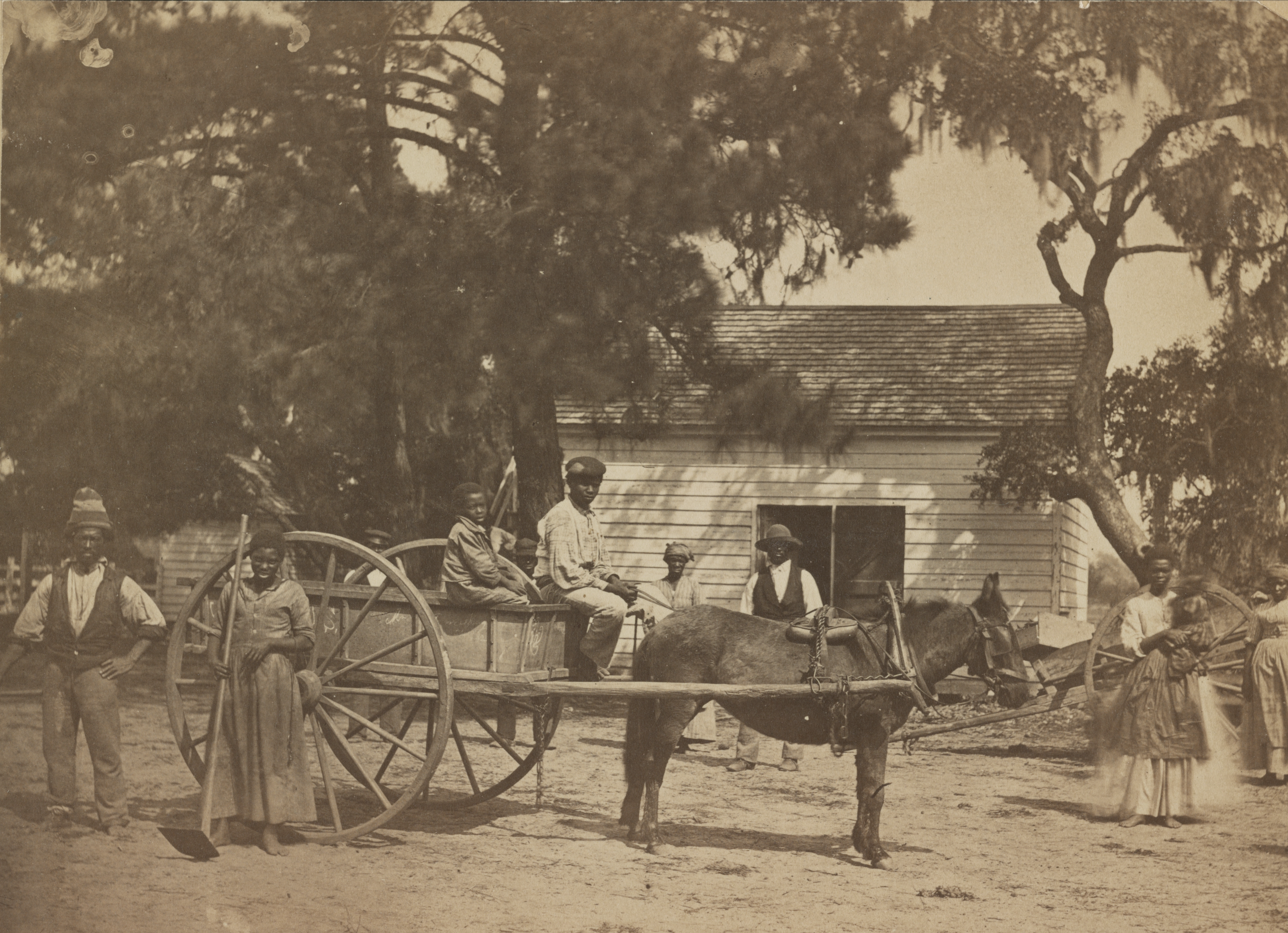
Slaves at the plantation of James Hopkinson, 1862

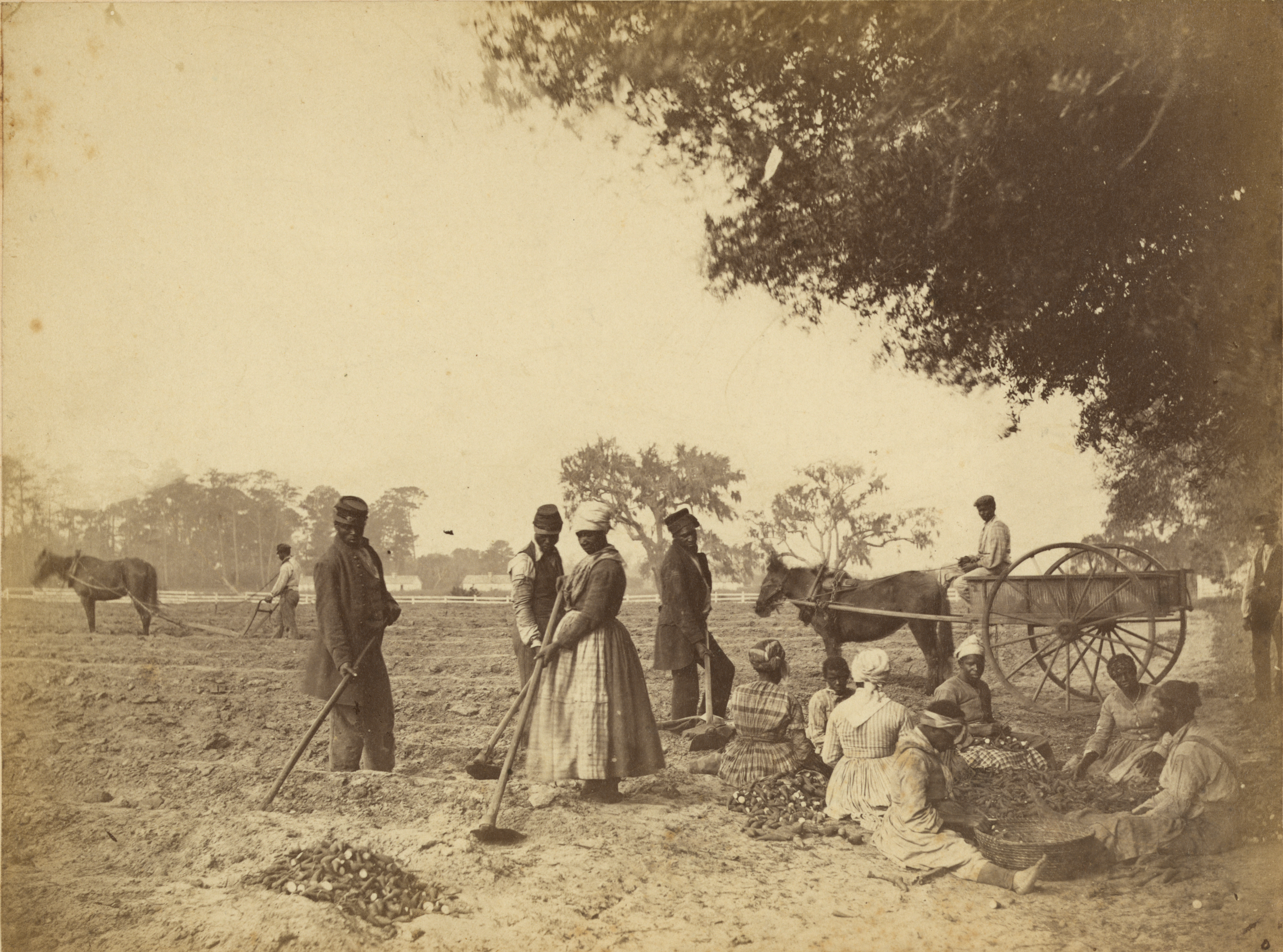
Sweet potato planting, Hopkinson's Plantation, 1862
