= Grove Plantation =

Historic house in South Carolina, United States

- U.S. National Register of Historic Places
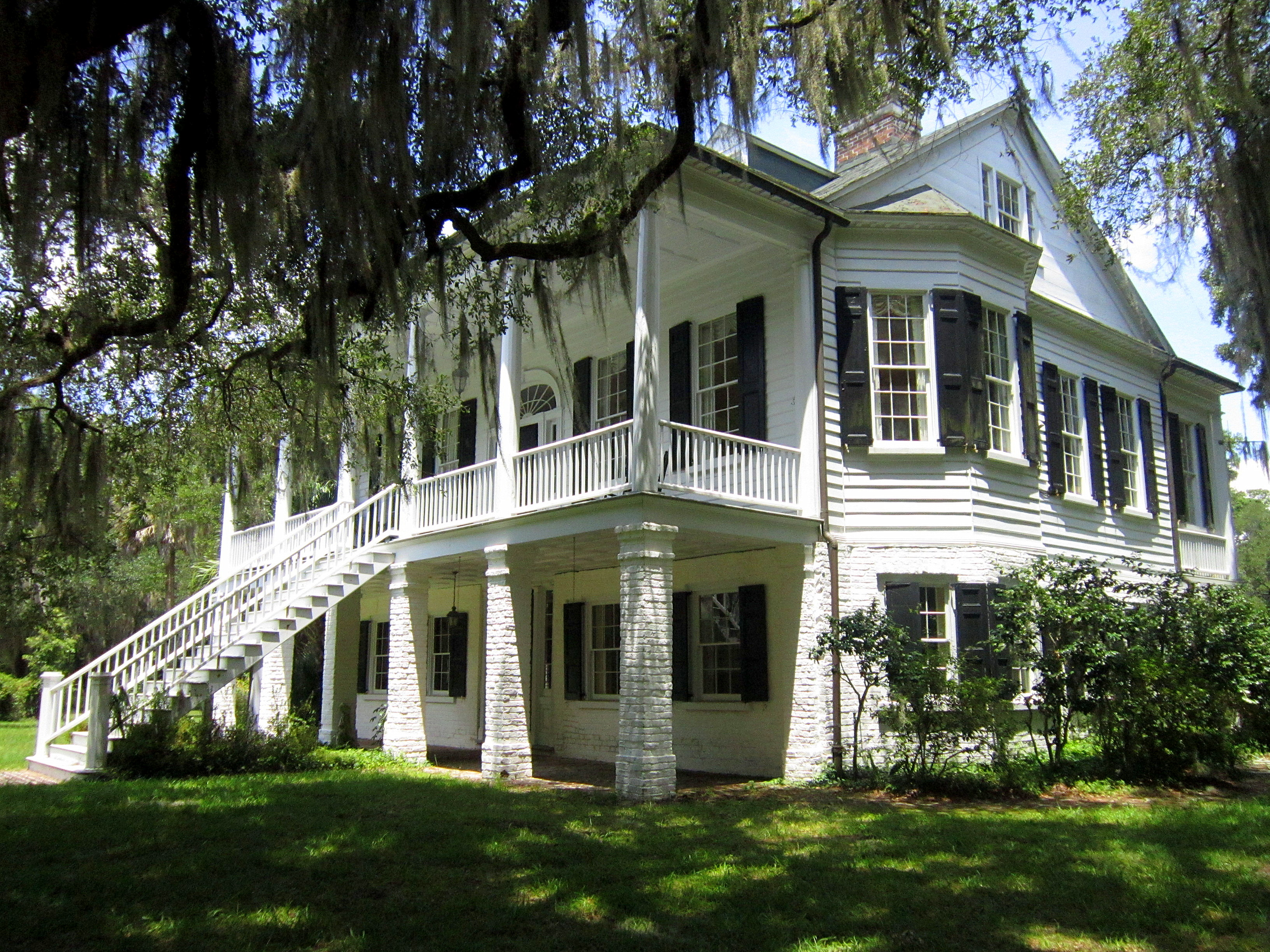

- Location within South Carolina Location within the United States
- Location: 8675 Willtown Road, Hollywood, SC 29449
- Coordinates: 32°39′53″N 80°23′37″W
- Area: 1,240 acres (500 ha)
- Built: 1828
- Architectural style: Late Federal
- NRHP reference No.: 78002495
- Added to NRHP: 1978

Grove Plantation is a plantation house in Adams Run, South Carolina.

== History ==
The area now known as the Grove Plantation was a land grant to Robert Fenwick in 1694. From 1695 until 1825, the property changed hands nine times.

=== Morris years ===
In 1825, George Washington Morris (1799–1834), a grandson of Lewis Morris (1726–1798), signer of the Declaration of Independence, who purchased the land and named it Grove Plantation.

George Washington Morris, who was born in 1796 at Morrisania, the family estate in Westchester County, New York, married Maria Evans Whaley from Edisto. His parents owned large tracts of land, including a plantation directly across the river from what is now known as Grove Plantation. He built the Grove House about 1828.

It is built in the late-Federal-period plantation style and has the unusual feature of polygonal rooms and projecting symmetrical polygonal bays. G.W. Morris died on August 22, 1834, leaving his wife, a son, and three daughters. After his death, his wife, Maria, kept control of the Grove, and later purchased a schooner, with which she transported freight for her neighbors. By 1837, she had not only paid off her husband's debts, but she also had the house plastered. In 1839, she installed a threshing machine and by 1841, she had a housekeeper and a governess in her employ in addition to her overseer.

G. W. Morris' son, George Jr., was not a good business manager, and from the time his mother passed the management of the plantation to him until the time of his death in 1857, he built up huge debts. After his death, the plantation was sold to John Berkely Grimball in 1857. John Grimball was married to Margaret Ann (Meta) Morris, G. W. Morris' niece, and owned the adjacent plantation, Pinebury. He combined Pinebury and the Grove into one large property and the family moved into the Grove House early in 1858. During the Civil War, the family went to Spartanburg. Both Pinebury and the Grove were sites of military activity and the Grove House was at one time occupied by Confederate troops. Since the Grove was considered abandoned, it was confiscated. On January 24, 1866, J. Berkeley Grimball made application to the Bureau of Refugees, Freedmen, and Abandoned Lands for restoration of his property. Because he took the amnesty oath of loyalty to the United States, he was able to regain ownership of the Grove and Pinebury.

After the war, John Grimball was unable to make his mortgage payments on the Grove. Therefore, the land reverted to G. W. Morris' heirs, Josephine M. Porter (1831–1892), the wife of Peter A. Porter (1827–1864), a prominent Colonel from New York who had died during the Civil War and who had previously been married to another southerner, Mary Cabell Breckinridge (1826–1854), and Sabina Ann Morris in 1870.

=== Post-Morris ===
After that, the property changed hands numerous times until, it was purchased by Owen Winston in 1929, the President of Brooks Brothers. Winston did a restoration of the house and was most likely the one who had the outbuildings put in.

The plantation once again had several owners until Thompson Brown purchased it in 1930. The Brown family used the Grove as a winter vacation residence and hunted waterfowl and deer. R. Carter Henry purchased the Grove in 1964. The Henrys did another extensive renovation on the house. They changed the stairwell in the foyer to an open design. They also put the duck tiles around the fireplace in the conference room. In addition, they did extensive renovations to the outbuildings.

Mr. Henry sold the Grove to A. Leigh Baier in the early 1970s. During the Baier family's ownership, numerous rice field trunks (water control structures) were rebuilt or replaced and many of the dikes around the rice fields were repaired. Mr. Baier sold the Grove to Margaret B. Hendricks, who owned the plantation until The Nature Conservancy purchased it in 1991.

== Present day ==
The United States Fish and Wildlife Service purchased the property in 1992 and designated it as the ACE Basin National Wildlife Refuge. The Grove Plantation House is one of only a few antebellum mansions in the ACE Basin area to survive the Civil War. Former owners ensured it would be preserved by placing it on the National Register of Historic Places in 1978. Another extensive renovation was done on the house in 1996 - 1997. Today it houses the offices of the US Fish and Wildlife Service's ACE Basin National Wildlife Refuge.
