= USS E. B. Hale =

Gunboat of the United States Navy

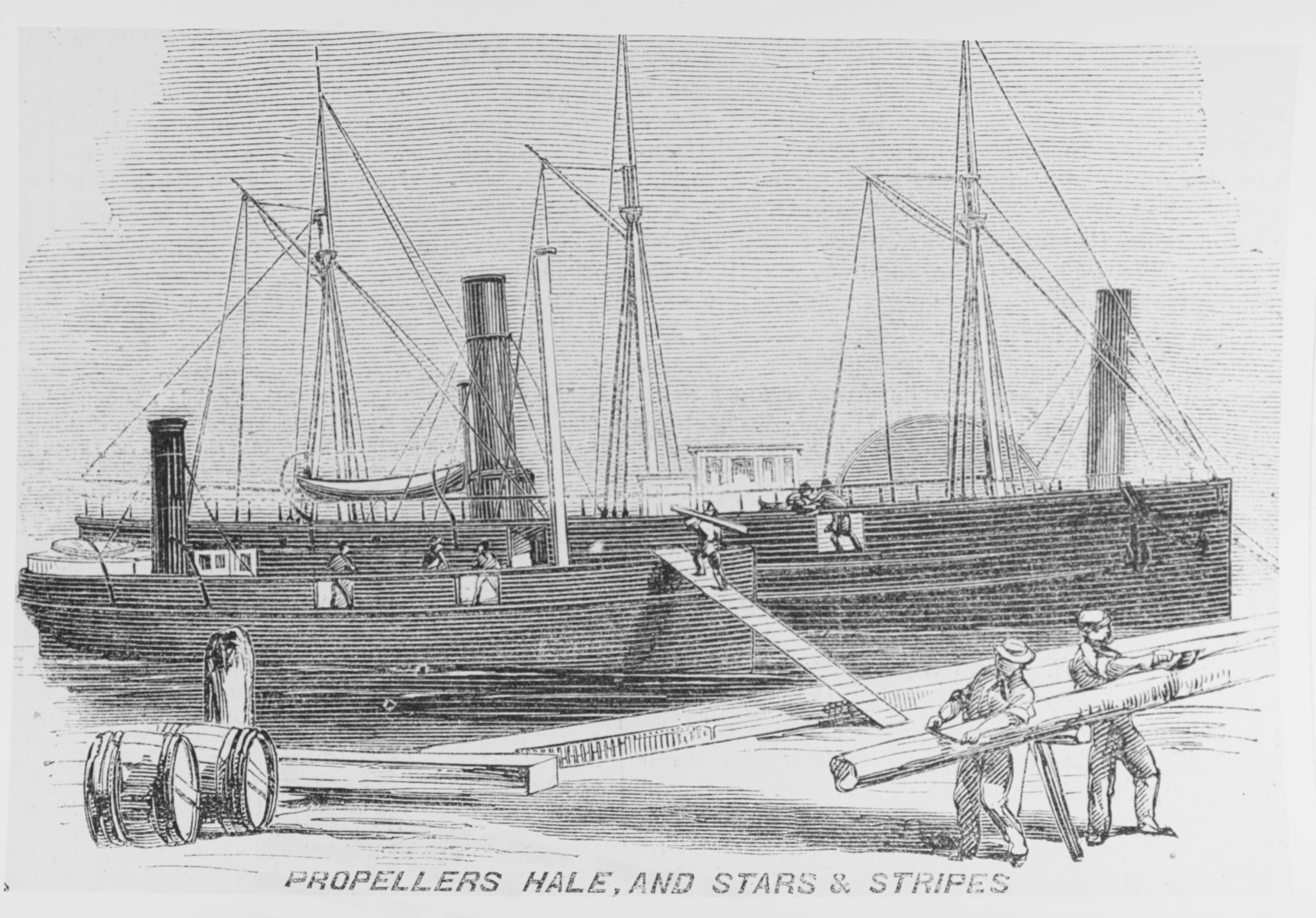
- The steamers E.B. Hale and Stars & Stripes fitting out at the New York Navy Yard, during the summer of 1861

History

United States
- Laid down: not known
- Launched: not known
- Acquired: July 1861
- Commissioned: 4 September 1861
- Decommissioned: 11 May 1865
- Stricken: 1865 (est.)
- Fate: Sold, 20 June 1865

General characteristics
- Displacement: 220 tons
- Length: 117 ft (36 m)
- Beam: 28 ft (8.5 m)
- Draft: 7 ft 6 in (2.29 m)
- Depth of hold: 8 ft 6 in (2.59 m)
- Propulsion: steam engine; screw-propelled
- Speed: 8 knots
- Complement: 50
- Armament: four 32-pounder guns

The USS E. B. Hale was a steamer acquired by the Union Navy during the American Civil War. She was used as a gunboat by the Navy to patrol navigable waterways of the Confederacy to prevent the South from trading with other countries.

E: B. Hale, a screw steamer, was purchased in July 1861, and commissioned 4 September 1861, Acting Master W. J. Foster in command.

== Civil War service ==
=== Assigned to patrol the Potomac River ===
She sailed 28 September for Washington, D.C., and from her arrival 1 October patrolled the Potomac River. On 14 November she sailed to deliver six heavy guns to the New York Navy Yard.

=== Assigned to the South Atlantic Blockade ===
E. B. Hale left New York City 20 December 1861 to join the South Atlantic Blockading Squadron, and arrived at Port Royal, South Carolina, New Year's Eve. She combed the inland waters of South Carolina, Georgia, and Florida, including reconnaissance in Wright's and Mud Rivers and up the Ashepoo and Combahee in South Carolina.

She participated in attacks on the enemy at Port Royal Ferry, in the Coosaw River and the North Edisto River, and took part in the expeditions up to St. Johns River Bluff. On 14 November 1862 E. B. Hale captured the schooner Wave with a cargo of cotton and turpentine, and on 11 December sailed for New York where she was decommissioned for repairs.

Recommissioned 18 February 1863, E. B. Hale stood out for Port Royal 9 March and during the next 2 years served on patrol and picket duty, having frequent encounters with the Confederates.

== Post-war decommissioning and sale ==
She put to sea from Port Royal 24 April 1865 and five days later arrived at the Philadelphia Navy Yard where she was placed out of commission 11 May 1865 and sold 20 June.
