= USS Penguin (1861) =

Gunboat of the United States Navy

History

United States
- Name: USS Penguin
- Laid down: date unknown
- Launched: date unknown
- Acquired: 23 May 1861
- Commissioned: 25 June 1861
- Decommissioned: 24 August 1865
- Stricken: 1865 (est.)
- Fate: Sold, 8 September 1865

General characteristics
- Type: Steamer
- Displacement: 389 long tons (395 t)
- Length: 155 ft (47 m)
- Beam: 30 ft 8 in (9.35 m)
- Draft: 10 ft 8 in (3.25 m)
- Propulsion: steam engine; screw-propelled
- Speed: 10 kn (12 mph; 19 km/h)
- Complement: Unknown
- Armament: 1 × 12-pounder gun, 4 × 32-pounder guns

USS Penguin was a steamer acquired by the Union Navy during the American Civil War.

She was used by the Navy to patrol navigable waterways of the Confederacy to prevent the South from trading with other countries.

== Purchased at New York City in 1861 ==
Penguin was purchased at New York City on 23 May 1861, was commissioned on 25 June 1861, Acting Volunteer Lieutenant Thomas A. Budd in command.

== East Coast operations ==
Assigned originally to the North Atlantic Blockading Squadron, Penguin joined the Potomac Flotilla on 19 August 1861. In October she shifted to the South Atlantic Blockading Squadron and in November participated in the capture of Fort Walker and Fort Beauregard. Remaining with that squadron she assisted in the taking of Fernandina, Florida on 4 March 1862.

On the 22nd, a boat crew from Penguin and Henry Andrew was attacked while reconnoitering Mosquito Inlet. In the ensuing engagement, Acting Lt. Budd and four others were killed.

== Gulf of Mexico operations ==
Later shifted to the Gulf of Mexico, Penguin patrolled off the Texas coast. On 8 July 1864, she assisted in the destruction – near Galveston, Texas – of the blockade runner Matagorda and on 21 January 1865 she forced another, Granite City, ashore at Velasco, Texas.

== Post-Civil War decommissioning ==
After the Civil War, Penguin returned to the U.S. East Coast, decommissioned at Boston, Massachusetts on 24 August and was sold, to Fogg and Co. on 8 September.
