= William Aiken Walker =

American painter (1839–1921)

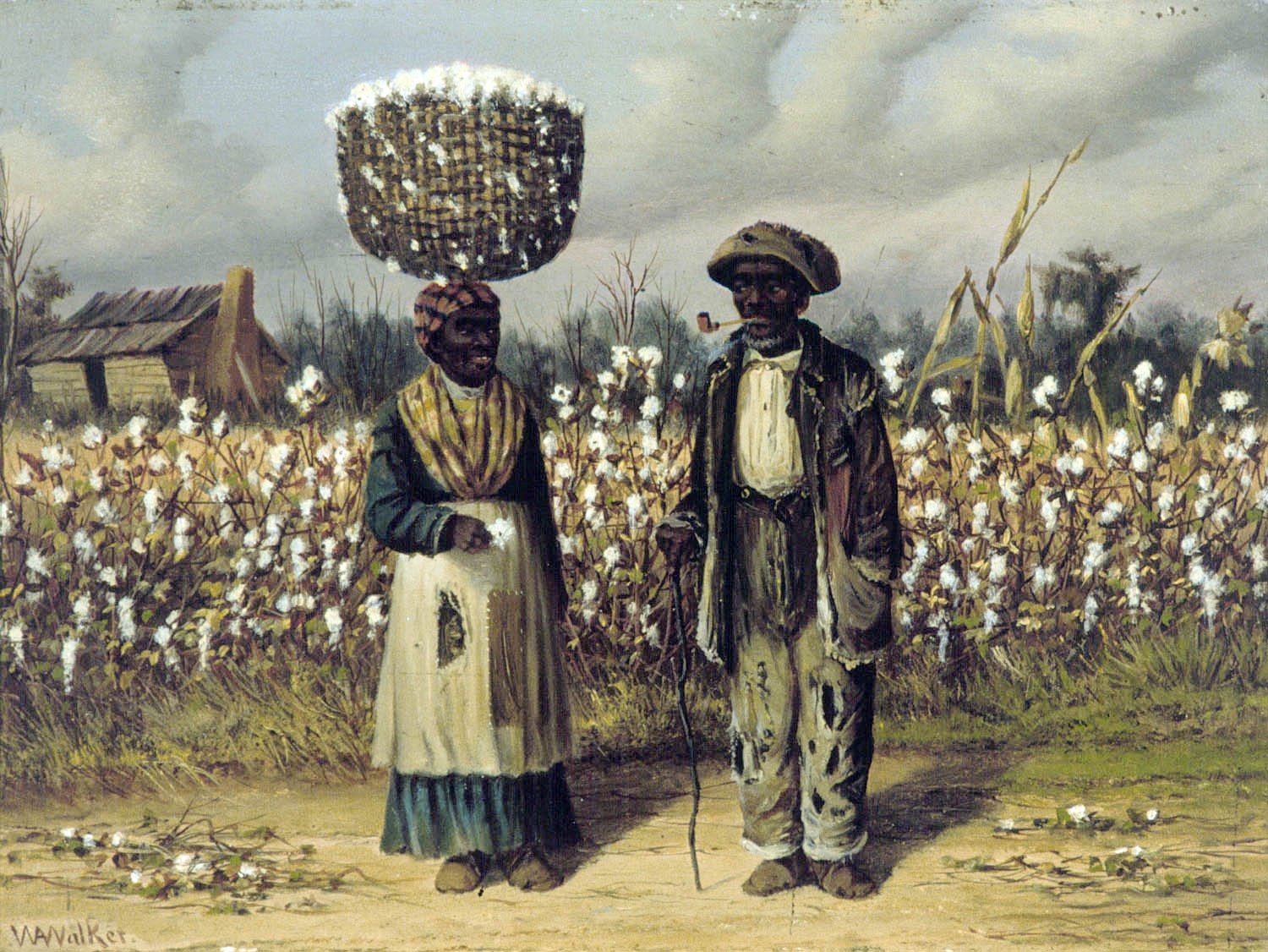
Cotton Pickers, oil on panel by William Aiken Walker

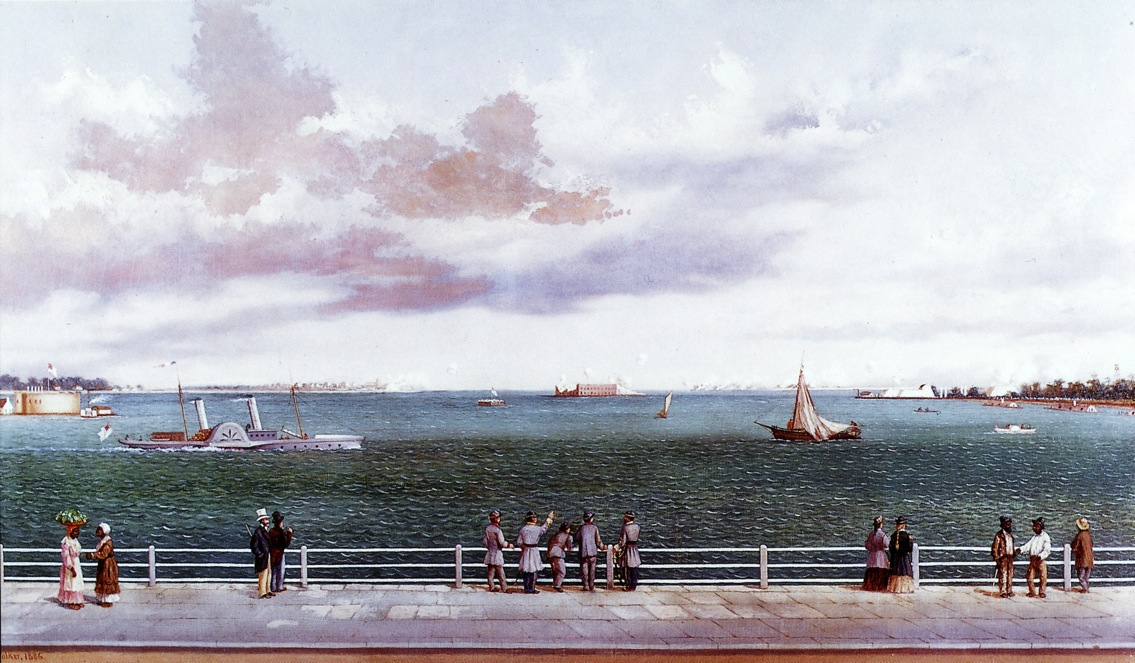
Bombardment of Fort Sumter, Charleston Harbor, South Carolina, 1863, oil on canvas, 1886, Gibbes Museum of Art

William Aiken Walker (March 11, 1839 – January 3, 1921) was an American artist best known for genre paintings of African-American sharecroppers. He also documented the American Civil War era during his service in the Confederate Army.

Walker was born to an Irish Protestant father and a mother of South Carolina background in Charleston, South Carolina in 1839. In 1841, after his father died, Walker's family remained in Charleston where Walker grew up.

In 1861, during the American Civil War, Walker was conscripted in the Confederate Army and was sent to Morris Island as part of the Palmetto Guard. Almost immediately, Walker was sent on to Richmond and Camp Davis. Four months later, he received a medical discharge from the army. For the remainder of the war he served as a civilian draftsman to the Confederate Engineers Corps and made maps and drawings of Charleston's defenses. He was separated from the military at the end of 1864. After the Civil War, Walker moved to Baltimore, where he produced small paintings of the "Old South" to sell as tourist souvenirs.

In 1868 Walker painted the ruins of the Cathedral of Saint John and Saint Finbar that burned down in December 1861 in a fire that ravaged Charleston, South Carolina.

He is best known for his paintings depicting the lives of poor black emancipated slaves, especially sharecroppers in the post-Reconstruction American South. Two of his paintings were reproduced by Currier and Ives as chromolithographs. Walker continued painting until his death on January 3, 1921, in Charleston, where he is buried in the family plot at Magnolia Cemetery.
