= Grimball =

Grimball is a surname. Notable people with the surname include:

- Elizabeth B. Grimball (1875-1953), American theatrical and film producer
- John Grimball (fl. 1945), decorated American soldier
- John A. Grimball (died 1867), American politician from Mississippi

== See also ==
- Paul Grimball House Ruins, archaeological site in South Carolina, United States
- Battle of Grimball's Landing, 1863 battle at James Island, South Carolina
- Battle of Grimball's Causeway, 1865 battle at James Island, South Carolina
