= 68th New York Infantry Regiment =

American infantry regiment

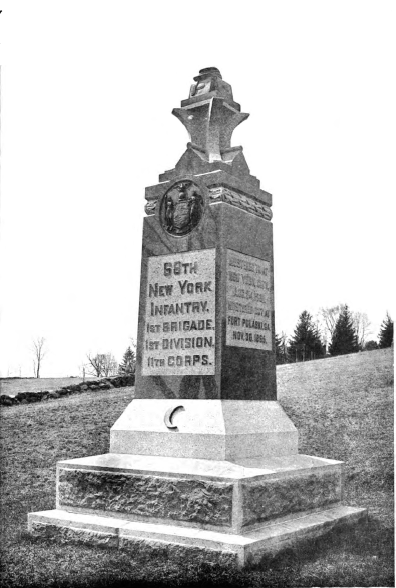
- Monument to the 68th New York Infantry, at Gettysburg, Pennsylvania.
- Active: July 22, 1861 – November 30, 1865
- Country: United States of America
- Allegiance: Union
- Branch: Union Army
- Type: Infantry
- Size: 1,100
- Nicknames: "Cameron Rifles", "Second German Rifle Regiment"
- Engagements: American Civil War: Second Battle of Bull Run; Battle of Chancellorsville; Battle of Gettysburg; Chattanooga campaign

Commanders
- Notable commanders: Robert J. Betge; Gotthilf von Bourry d'Ivernois; Felix Salm-Salm

The 68th New York Infantry Regiment served in the Union Army during the American Civil War. Also known as the Cameron Rifles or the Second German Rifle Regiment, the men were mostly German immigrants. Organized in July 1861, three months after the outbreak of war, the 68th saw service in the Eastern and Western theaters.

As a part of the Army of the Potomac, it was initially assigned to the defenses of Washington, D.C. Later, the 68th was transferred to the Shenandoah Valley and fought at the Battle of Cross Keys. The men of the 68th were then reassigned to central Virginia and found themselves in the thick of the fighting at Second Bull Run. After returning to the nation's capital, the regiment fought in Chancellorsville and was routed by Confederate forces. At Gettysburg, they saw battle on two of the three days and took heavy losses.

The regiment was then transferred to the west and participated in the Chattanooga Campaign. The 68th fought in the battles of Wauhatchie and Missionary Ridge, assisting in the Union victories there. The regiment marched to relieve the siege of Knoxville, and then spent the last year of the war on occupation duty in Tennessee and Georgia, before being disbanded in November 1865.

== Raising the regiment ==
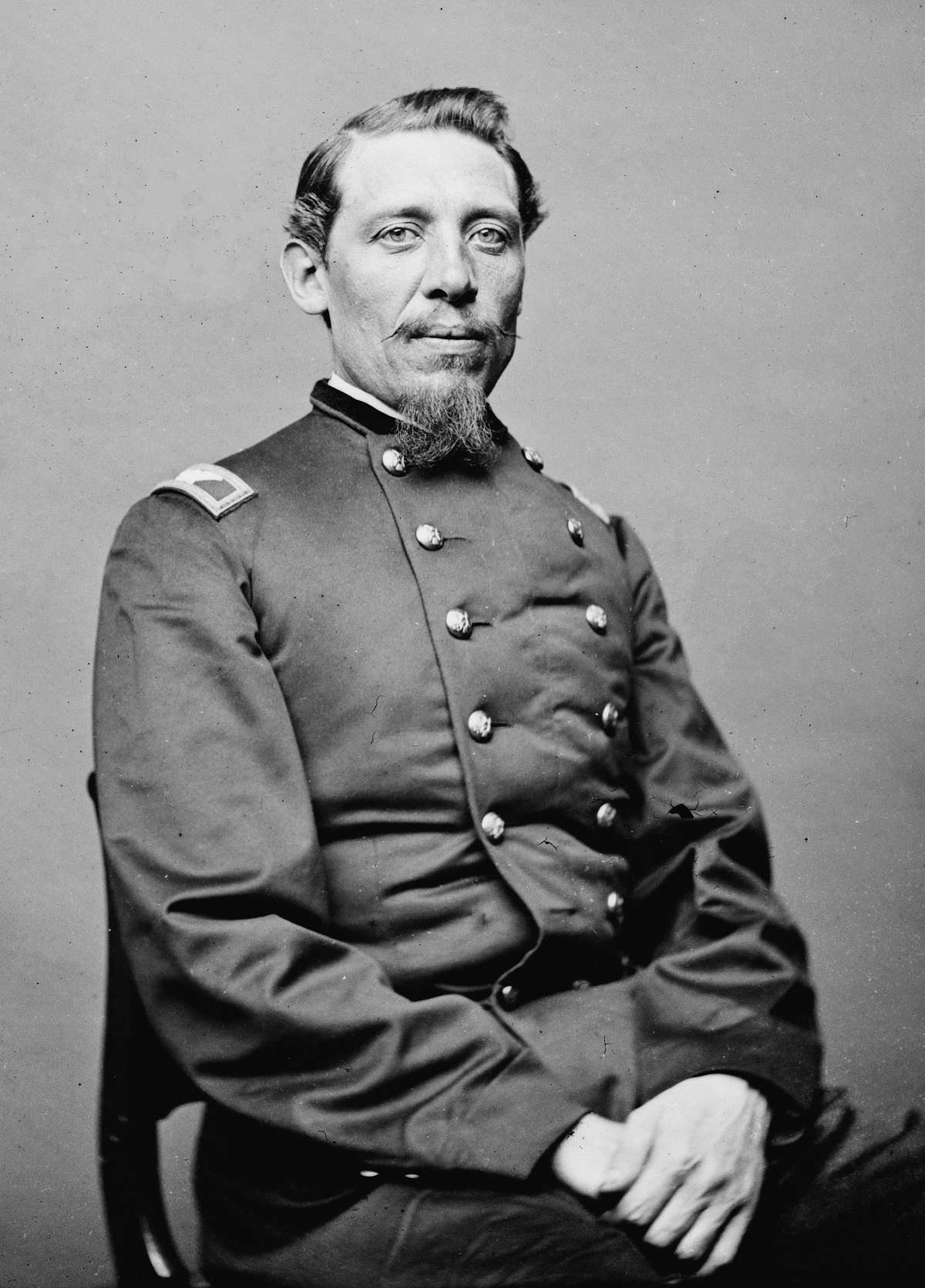
Robert Julius Betge was the first colonel of the 68th New York.

On July 22, 1861, the United States War Department authorized Robert J. Betge to raise a volunteer infantry regiment in New York. Recruited to serve for three years, the men came mostly from Manhattan (New York City), and also from New Jersey, Maryland, and Pennsylvania. The mostly German immigrants were also called the "Second German Rifles" (the First German Rifles, raised several months earlier, were the 8th New York Volunteer Infantry Regiment), but Betge called the regiment the "Cameron Rifles", after Secretary of War Simon Cameron. The officers were also German, and many had served in the armies of Austria, Prussia, and other German states. In all, 1,020 men filled the ranks when the regiment had finished recruiting.

Accepted into service on August 19, the 68th left New York the next day, traveling by train from Perth Amboy, New Jersey, to Washington, D.C., to join the brigade of Brigadier General Louis Blenker in the Army of the Potomac. Blenker was a German immigrant himself, a refugee of the Revolutions of 1848, and many of the units under his command were heavily German-American. Encamped at Roach's Mills, Virginia, the 68th participated in the defense of Washington, losing three men in their first combat, a minor skirmish with a Confederate patrol.

In November, the Army was reorganized; the 68th was shifted to Colonel Adolph von Steinwehr's brigade and Blenker moved up to command the division. They encamped at Hunter's Chapel, Virginia, for the remainder of the winter. There, Betge was brought before a court-martial, accused of "conduct unbecoming an officer and gentleman": confiscating two horses and other property from "loyal" Virginia citizens, and taking a bribe to hire the 68th's regimental sutler. He was not convicted, and was permitted to return to the regiment.

== Shenandoah Valley ==
In March 1862, the Army was again reorganized and Blenker's brigade was merged into the II Corps, led by Maj. Gen. Edwin Vose Sumner. That month the 68th moved to Warrenton, Virginia, where it came into contact with Confederate cavalry; three of the officers were captured. The following month, Blenker's brigade was moved into Maj. Gen. John C. Frémont's Mountain Department, necessitating a march to Winchester, Virginia, where the 68th and the rest of Frémont's army guarded the western part of the Shenandoah Valley against incursions by Confederate forces under Lt. Gen. Stonewall Jackson. Their long march had left the 68th bereft of supplies and low on rations. Colonel Betge protested against the mistreatment of his regiment, and was placed under arrest, surrendering command to Lt. Col., John H. Kleefish.

The initial action in Jackson's Valley Campaign took place to their east, but in June Frémont's force of 15,000 joined the 10,000-man division of Brig. Gen. James Shields to converge on Jackson south of Massanutten Mountain. Jackson was determined to attack the two Union columns separately and arranged half of his troops to block Shields on the right side of the mountain, while the other half, commanded by Maj. Gen. Richard S. Ewell, blocked the left side. Jackson's wish was realized when, on June 8, Frémont's army attacked. Frémont, believing he was striking Jackson's rear, instead attacked Ewell head-on, and Jackson soon brought his whole force to bear on the Union troops in the Battle of Cross Keys. The men of the 68th came under concentrated fire for the first time but were not heavily involved in the battle, although two men were killed. The battle was a defeat for the Union, and Frémont's force did not attack again, being blocked instead by a small holding force from Ewell's wing. The rest of Jackson's force then turned to attack Shields's army the next day at Port Republic. Frémont's infantry did not figure in the battle, another Confederate victory, though his artillery shelled the enemy from long range.

After the battle, the 68th marched to Cedar Creek and the army was placed under the overall command of Maj. Gen. John Pope; Frémont's force was designated the First Corps of the Army of Virginia. Frémont, who outranked Pope, resigned in protest, and President Lincoln accepted the resignation. Lincoln replaced him with Maj. Gen. Franz Sigel, who had been commanding troops in the Western theater. Sigel was, like many in the First Corps, a German immigrant, and the 68th and the other German regiments in the First Corps were happy for the change in commanders. Sigel ordered the 68th to Luray for picket duty. When they arrived, Betge resigned his commission and Kleefish continued to command the regiment until a new colonel could be assigned.

== Second Bull Run ==
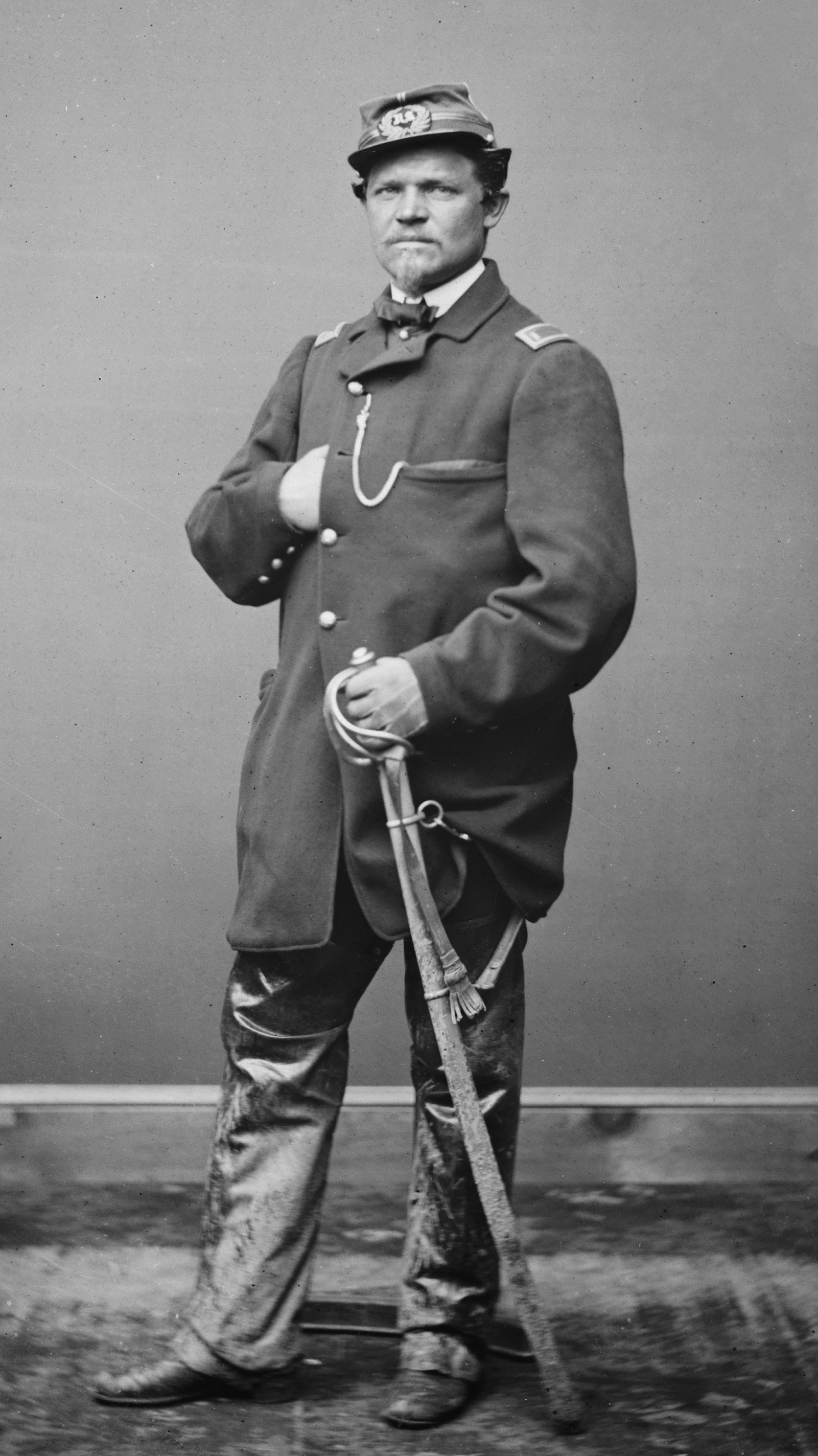
Major Carl von Wedell briefly commanded the regiment when his superiors had all resigned or been killed.

The regiment remained in the Shenandoah Valley until August 1862 when they joined Pope's army and moved south to engage Robert E. Lee's Army of Northern Virginia. They arrived the day after the Battle of Cedar Mountain, and joined Pope's army in its retreat from that Confederate victory. After a series of minor actions along the Rappahannock, Pope's forces met Jackson's half of Lee's army near Manassas Station. Lee had divided his army into wings led by Jackson and Lt. Gen. James Longstreet and sent Jackson's force to raid Pope's rear to cut his supply line. Pope believed he had a chance to destroy the Army of Northern Virginia one half at a time, and made the decision to attack. Jackson's men struck the first blow, however, and drove off a portion of the Union force. The next day, having taken up a strong defensive position along an unfinished railroad, Jackson awaited Pope's advance. Pope obliged him, sending the Army forward against Jackson's lines. The 68th and the rest of Sigel's corps occupied the middle of the advancing line. They were unable to break Jackson's lines, and withdrew. The Cameron Rifles had seen some action at Cross Keys, but this was their first experience of fierce fighting and they acquitted themselves well, despite the failure of the attack.

By the afternoon, Longstreet joined Jackson with the other half of Lee's army and attacked the Union left. Longstreet believed it was too late for an attack, and did not attack that day, other than in a minor clash where his lines met some federal units at dusk. The next day, August 30, Pope attacked Jackson again at 3:00 p.m. Again, the attacking forces could not overcome their enemies' positions, and this time Longstreet counterattacked and forced them back toward their original positions. Sigel's forces, which did not take part in the initial Union assault, held firm against the Confederate counterattack, but after heavy casualties the army retreated. Among the casualties were 22 killed from the 68th (including Kleefish) and 59 wounded, making Second Bull Run one of the unit's bloodiest engagements.

The Army of Virginia retreated nearly all the way back to Washington. Pope was relieved and Maj. Gen. George B. McClellan placed in charge of the army once more. After burying Kleefish in Washington, the 68th redeployed to Fairfax, Virginia. With Kleefish dead and Betge having resigned, command of the regiment fell temporarily to Major Carl von Wedell. The officers then petitioned the Governor Horatio Seymour to commission Gotthilf von Bourry d'Ivernois as their new colonel, which he did. Von Bourry, a veteran of the Austrian army, (Note: A veteran of the Austrian army and the Second Italian War of Independence,) had served on Blenker's staff as a captain and had impressed the officers of the 68th with his tales of heroism in the Second Italian War of Independence.

== Army of the Potomac ==
=== Chancellorsville ===
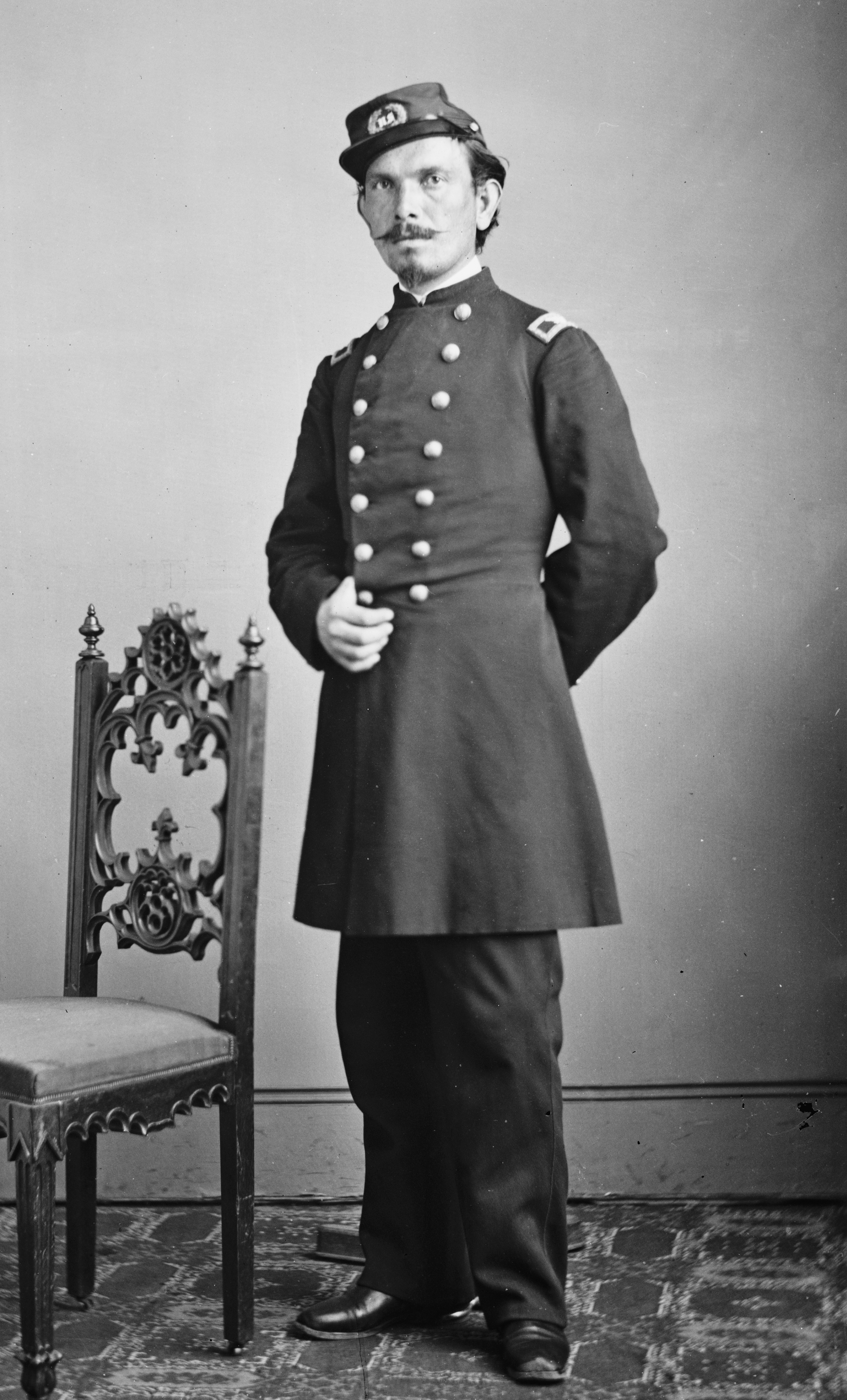
Gotthilf von Bourry d'Ivernois commanded the regiment from 1862 to 1863, when he was cashiered for drunkenness.

The 68th spent September and October 1862 defending Washington where they were attached to Alexander Schimmelfennig's 1st Brigade of the XI Corps in the Army of the Potomac (the re-numbered I Corps formerly of the Army of Virginia) still commanded by Sigel. In November, they advanced to Centreville with the rest of the Army, now under the command of Maj. Gen. Ambrose Burnside. Burnside, who had taken over the Army when McClellan was relieved of command earlier that month, was determined to bring battle to the enemy, and he ordered the Army to advance once more to the Rappahannock. The 68th, however, remained in reserve with the rest of the XI Corps, and so was spared any part in the defeat that befell the Union Army at the Battle of Fredericksburg. The Army retreated once again, and the 68th joined them in winter quarters at Stafford, Virginia.

Morale was low in the Army after Fredericksburg and the retreat that followed, and Burnside was replaced in command by Maj. Gen. Joseph Hooker. Several corps commanders were also replaced, including Sigel, whose XI Corps passed to Maj. Gen. Oliver O. Howard on April 2, 1863, when he resigned in protest because he believed he deserved a larger corps. In a corps of mostly German regiments, Howard was immediately unpopular and his distribution of religious tracts to the troops did not improve the relationship. The regiment was smaller, too, than it had been: just 259 present for duty. Their new commander in the XI Corps's 3rd Brigade was another German, Brig. Gen. Carl Schurz.

Hooker brought the Army to the Rappahannock for a third time, but rather than crossing directly into the defenses of the Confederates, he divided his much larger force to attack Lee's army from two sides simultaneously. This time, the 68th and the other regiments of the XI Corps were part of the action, crossing the river with Hooker's main force on May 1, 1863, to attack Lee's left. Despite Hooker's careful planning, the Battle of Chancellorsville was another Union defeat. After crossing the Rappahannock, Hooker had ordered the wing including the XI Corps to halt and await the Confederate attack. Faced with attacks on two sides, Lee daringly divided his smaller force to engage both: the pause allowed Lee to send Jackson with the bulk of the army to meet the Union advance and outflank their right wing the next day, May 2. Although he was warned of the impending attack, Howard did not order the units under his command to entrench, and when Jackson's men arrived the XI Corps was caught unprepared. At about 5:15 p.m., Jackson's force of 21,500 men caught the XI Corps in the flank and by surprise as the men were preparing their dinner. Schurz ordered his brigade to shift to meet the assault, and the 68th jumped to action, but they were still overwhelmed by the force of numbers and began a disorganized retreat an hour into the attack. After falling back, the 68th and the other retreating units rallied to avoid a complete rout and held off the Confederates until nightfall. The XI Corps suffered nearly 2,500 casualties, including 5 dead, 16 wounded, and 32 missing from the 68th. The next day, the XI Corps held the left of the Union line and was again attacked, but unlike the previous day, they were not at the focus of the Confederate attack. The entire army retreated across the Rappahannock the next day, defeated once more.

=== Gettysburg ===
In the wake of Chancellorsville, newspapers heaped scorn on the German regiments, blaming the 68th and the others for the defeat. The XI Corps suffered from low morale, and several officers resigned their commissions, including Lt. Col. Carl Vogel and five others from the 68th. The Army of the Potomac pulled back from the Rappahannock, and was soon on the move as the Army of Northern Virginia slipped past and marched north toward Pennsylvania. Led by still another new commander, Maj. Gen. George Meade, the Union army followed the Confederates north. The 68th, now with 267 present for duty, had been shifted to the XI Corps's 1st Brigade under Brig. Gen. Leopold von Gilsa when the Army of the Potomac prepared to meet the rebels at the Battle of Gettysburg. The XI Corps was among the first to arrive on the scene on July 1, 1863. Schurz's brigade arrived first, and he ordered them to take up defensive positions north of the town. The other two divisions arrived next, and Howard arrayed them to resist the rebel onslaught he knew was coming soon. The landscape was mostly devoid of features that would aid in defense, but Gilsa's men were able to entrench on one low rise, Blocher's Knoll. The 68th was sent forward to skirmish, along with the 54th New York and part of the 153rd New York, and were the first to be attacked and ousted from their positions when Lt. Gen. Jubal Early's Confederate division came on in numbers and outflanked them. The army retreated south of the town, but Howard, after arguing with Maj. Gen. Winfield Scott Hancock over who was in command in Meade's absence, rallied the troops there and ordered them to entrench.

The 68th began the second day in a more defensible position on Cemetery Hill. This placed them at the center of the Union line, and most of the day's early action was on the flanks. In the evening, however, Early's forces attacked again; the charging Confederates quickly reached the top of the hill and some hand-to-hand combat broke out, but losses were light because the growing darkness made it difficult for soldiers on both sides to shoot accurately. Reinforcements from the II Corps arrived and helped the XI Corps hold the position. On the third day, the 68th remained in that position, but the major attack of the day, Pickett's Charge, was to their left. The 68th performed better than they had at Chancellorsville, participating in their first Union victory. They paid the price with much higher casualties, 8 killed and 63 wounded; 67 were made prisoners of war, many on the first day during the retreat to Cemetery Hill. In the thick of the action for two out of three days, the 68th lost more men at Gettysburg than in any other battle.

== Chattanooga campaign ==
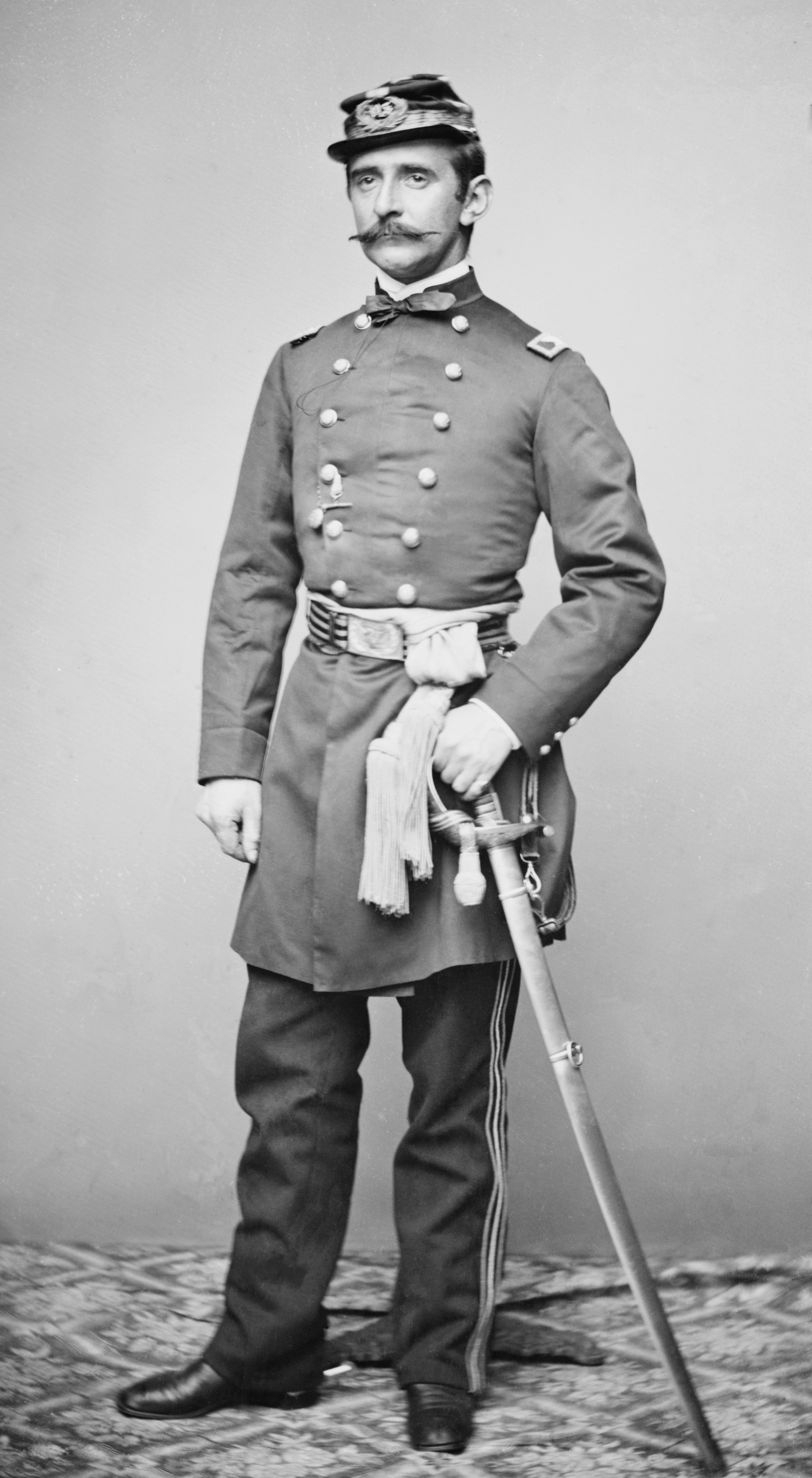
Prince Felix Salm-Salm commanded the regiment from 1864 until they were mustered out.

Lee's army retreated into Virginia and, after some delay, the Army of the Potomac followed. After a skirmish in Hagerstown, Maryland, on July 12, the 68th crossed the Potomac into Virginia on July 16 and took up guard duty along the Orange and Alexandria Railroad near Warrenton. The regiment remained there until September, when it and the rest of the XI Corps were detached from the Army of the Potomac and sent to Tennessee. The XI and XII Corps, under Hooker's command, made up an independent force added to the Armies of the Tennessee, the Cumberland, and the Ohio, which were all operating in that theater. Maj. Gen. William Rosecrans, having just lost the Battle of Chickamauga, was besieged in Chattanooga, and the other armies were gathering to lift the siege and attack the Confederate army there, led by Lt. Gen. Braxton Bragg. Traveling for seven days by rail, the 68th arrived in Tennessee on September 30. (Note: The efficiency of the United States' railroads over the Confederacy's effectively canceled the normal advantage of interior lines of communications that the Rebels possessed. The 68th and the rest of Hooker's command traveled north and west via the Baltimore and Ohio Railroad and then rode south through Kentucky via Nashville and across Tennessee to Bridgeport on the Tennessee River with all their arms, supplies, artillery, wagons, horses, and mules. While traveling 400 miles further with slightly more than twice the number, the troops had taken the same time as Longstreet's troops who had arrived two weeks earlier still lacking arms and supplies.)

The regiment spent the first month guarding railroads again, this time west of Chattanooga. Rosecrans soon found himself relieved of duty, and Maj. Gen. Ulysses S. Grant was placed in overall command of the three armies plus Hooker's two corps. The 68th, too, saw a change in its leadership when Col. von Bourry was cashiered for drunkenness and command passed to Lt. Col. Albert von Steinhausen. By this time, losses from Gettysburg and illness had reduced the regiment to 127 men present for duty, just over a tenth of their numbers from the start of the war.

Grant's armies converged on Chattanooga and planned to attack Bragg's army. Getting into place required the XI and XII Corps to cross the Tennessee River at Bridgeport, Alabama, and march rapidly for Lookout Valley, opening the supply line to Chattanooga. They did so, to the surprise of the Confederate forces there, which had not expected an attack from that quarter. On October 28, Hooker's two corps were attacked by a part of Bragg's army, which had by now been joined by Longstreet and some units from the Army of Northern Virginia. Bragg ordered Longstreet to drive the federals back and he attacked. In the ensuing Battle of Wauhatchie, the XII Corps took the brunt of the initial assault. Hooker bypassed Howard and ordered Schurz to bring up the XI Corps to join the fight. The engagement was confused on both sides, but the Union forces were victorious, driving off the rebels and inflicting twice the casualties they received. With the supply lines now reopened to Chattanooga, Grant planned to dislodge Bragg's army. At the Battle of Lookout Mountain, the 68th was held in reserve on the first day, November 24. The battle continued the next day and a part of Howard's XI Corps, including the 68th, was shifted to the far left of the Union lines to reinforce Sherman's attack on Missionary Ridge. There, the 68th skirmished with the enemy, but was unable to advance. The Confederates were forced to retreat, however, as Maj. Gen. George Thomas's troops' assault on their center sent Bragg's army into retreat from the ridge.

Four days later, on November 28, the 68th, still attached to Sherman's army, marched north to relieve Burnside's army, which was besieged in Knoxville, Tennessee. Before they arrived, however, Burnside managed to defeat the enemy, and the regiment returned south. It spent the winter guarding railroads near their winter quarters in Bridgeport. In April, the enlistments of many three-year men were due to expire, including the men of the 68th. The men were sent to Louisville, Kentucky, and then by rail back to New York City for four weeks' leave of absence. With the war not yet over, the government encouraged re-enlisting, and many of the 68th did so. The three-year men of the 8th and 29th Infantry, two other German-American units reduced by casualties and expiring enlistment terms, were consolidated into the 68th. Drafted men and substitutes brought the ranks up to 400 present for duty.

== Re-enlistment and the end of the war ==
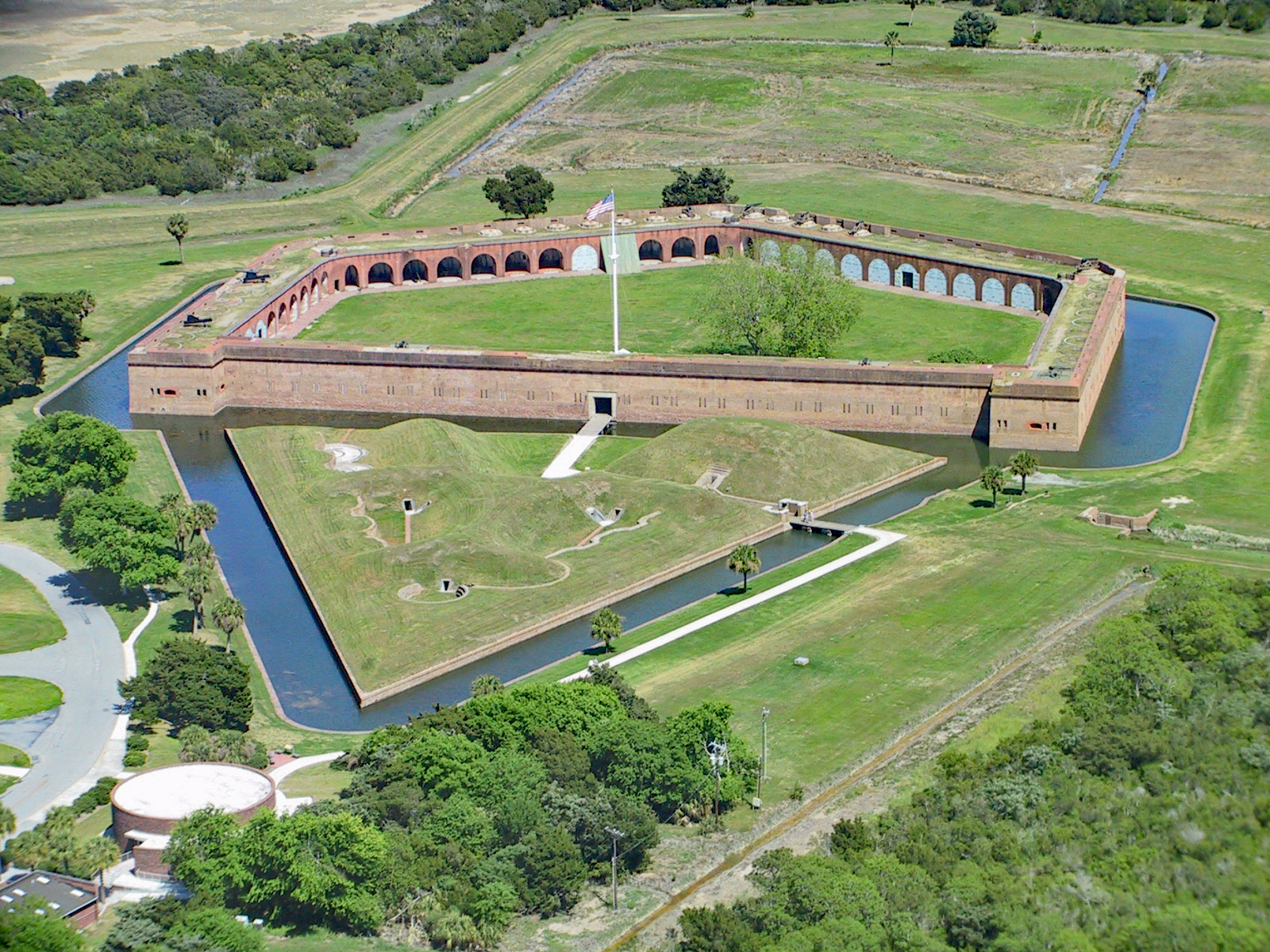
The 68th New York finished the war at Fort Pulaski, Georgia.

Among those continuing in the army was the colonel of the 8th New York, Prince Felix Salm-Salm. (Note: From Wikipedia article: Prince Felix Constantin Alexander Johann Nepomuk of Salm-Salm, was born at Anholt Castle, in the former Principality of Salm, which had been incorporated into the Prussian Province of Westphalia by 1815. He was the third and youngest son of Prince Florentin, the formerly reigning Prince of Salm-Salm (1786–1846). Although, the Salm dynasty had lost sovereignty, it retained royal privileges as a Mediatized House in the German Confederation. Trained at a cadet-school in Berlin, he became a cavalry officer in the Prussian 11th Hussar Regiment, serving with distinction in the First Schleswig War, where he was severely wounded in battle. After the war he joined the Austrian army, serving in the Austro-Sardinian War of 1859. However, his erratic way of life alienated his family; substantial gambling debts as well as several scandals and duels finally forced him to emigrate. In 1861, he came to the United States and received a colonel's commission and served on staff duty. In 1863, he took command of the 8th New York Volunteer Infantry Regiment, but would only remain there through the winter. In February, 1864, he was put under arrest for falsely representing himself as colonel of the 68th and enriching himself by taking money from young officers hoping for commissions in his regiment. Released and actually appointed colonel of New York's 68th in June, 1864, he took part in the Battle of Nashville, and toward the end of the war was assigned to the command of the post at Atlanta. Salm-Salm was mustered out of the volunteers on November 30, 1865 and nominated for brevet brigadier general, he received Senate confirmation on March 12, 1866. After the war, he offered his services to Maximilian I of Mexico, becoming the Emperor's aide-de-camp and chief of household. Captured at Querétaro, he was sentenced to death by firing squad. Thanks to the efforts of his wife, he was pardoned by Juárez and released from custody in December 1867. Returning to Europe, he re-entered the Prussian Army as major in the 4th Guards Grenadiers regiment. He was killed at Saint-Privat-la-Montagne during the Battle of Gravelotte in the Franco-Prussian War.) As the 68th had been without a colonel since von Bourry had been cashiered, Governor Seymour appointed Salm-Salm to the post on June 8, 1864. The youngest son of a minor German prince, Salm-Salm had served in the Prussian and Austrian armies before coming to America and joining the Union Army in 1861. His appointment to lead the 68th caused consternation among the officers, who had hoped for the promotion of one of their own. They protested to the governor unsuccessfully, but accepted that Salm-Salm was to be their leader. After the commissions and re-enlistments were sorted out, the 68th returned to Tennessee. They were again serving under Hooker in the XX Corps, which was consolidated from the XI and XII Corps and had now been attached permanently to Thomas's Army of the Cumberland. The 68th was assigned to Maj. Gen. James B. Steedman's 4th Brigade of the new corps and spent the next few months patrolling the Nashville and Chattanooga Railway in Tennessee. By that time, Confederate resistance in the area was weakened, and the rails and bridges were not damaged. Salm-Salm's wife, Agnes, joined him during the winter of 1864–1865, and the officers spent much of their time entertaining.

The 68th was not involved in the Battle of Nashville that December, in which Lt. Gen. John Bell Hood's Confederate army was nearly destroyed, but Salm-Salm did get permission to join the battle himself while the 68th stayed at their patrol stations. After Thomas's victory at Nashville, the 68th was ordered to prepare to pursue what remained of Hood's army. They redeployed to Decatur, Alabama, where Salm-Salm rejoined the regiment. They skirmished with Hood's rear guard, but the rainy weather aided the Confederates' escape. Salm-Salm led the regiment in the minor engagements following in January and February 1865 at Elrod's Tan Yard, Hog Jaw Valley, and Johnson's Crook. As Maj. Gen. William T. Sherman's Army of the Tennessee advanced farther into Georgia, the 68th did as well, making Atlanta their headquarters in March 1865. They continued to serve in northern Georgia through the spring and summer of 1865, and were stationed there when news came that the major Confederate armies had surrendered to Grant and Sherman. While there, they were ordered to facilitate the transition from a slave-based economy to a sharecropper system by encouraging plantation owners and their former slaves to sign farming contracts.

The 68th moved to Fort Pulaski, outside Savannah, Georgia, in October 1865. The men remained there until November 30, 1865, when, with the war finally ended, the 68th New York was mustered out of federal service. They boarded a steamship for New York and received their final pay at Hart's Island on December 14, where they disbanded. The regiment had served for more than four years, and had suffered casualties of 47 killed, 133 wounded, and 116 captured.

== See also ==
- List of New York Civil War regiments
