= Battle of James Island (1865) =

Battle of the American Civil War

Coordinates: 32.66596°N 79.99579°W

- Part of the American Civil War
| Date | February 10, 1865 |
| Location | James Island, South Carolina |
| Result | Confederate victory; see aftermath |

Belligerents
| United States (Union) | Confederate States |

Commanders and leaders
| (United States) Alexander Schimmelfennig | (Confederate States of America) Edward Manigault |

Strength
| 1,200 | 308 (161 engaged) |

Casualties and losses
| 20 killed 76 wounded | 20 killed 70 wounded |
- Location within South Carolina

The Battle of James Island (also known as the Skirmish at James Island) was a minor skirmish near the end of the American Civil War. It was known as the "Last fight for Charleston".

== Background ==
Since the fall of Morris Island in 1863, no major offensive had been carried out against Charleston. Several small skirmishes and expeditions were carried out against James Island and Johns Island. On February 10, 1865, Union troops from the Northern District of the Department of the South under Brigadier General Alexander Schimmelfennig made one final expedition to James Island. Confederate Major Edward Manigault of the South Carolina Siege Train (Manigault's Battalion) commanded a small force manning rifle pits on the southern edge of James Island at Grimball's Causeway.

== Battle ==
Early on the morning of February 10, four Union gunboats shelled the Confederate rifle pits while General Schimmelfennig's troops began their landing. The 144th New York Infantry led the main attack against the center of the Confederate line along the causeway. At the same time, the 54th New York Infantry made a charge against the right flank of the Confederate line. Manigault detached a small force from the 2nd South Carolina Artillery along the causeway to reinforce the right. The attack of the 144th New York began to falter but the flank attack succeeded and the Confederates began to give way. Major Manigault was severely wounded and taken prisoner during the fighting. The official records reported that his leg required amputation and he died as a result, although in fact the major survived. The Union forces occupied the Confederate rifle pits following the skirmish.

== Aftermath ==
The battle prevented the Union capture of James Island, despite their initial success, as both sides eventually withdrew. As Union General William T. Sherman’s army moved through South Carolina, the Confederate forces evacuated Charleston. Then on February 18, Schimmelfennig accepted the city's surrender from the mayor.

== Forces ==
Union
1st Separate Brigade: Brigadier General Alexander Schimmelfennig

- 54th New York Infantry: Colonel Eugene Kolzay
- 144th New York Infantry: Colonel James Lewis
- 32nd U.S. Colored Infantry: Colonel George W. Baird
- 33rd U.S. Colored Infantry (1st South Carolina Infantry): Colonel Thomas Wentworth Higginson
- 55th Massachusetts Colored Infantry: Colonel Alfred S. Hartwell

Confederate

- 2nd South Carolina Heavy Artillery: Major Edward Manigault
- Palmetto Guard: Captain Benjamin C. Webb
- 1st South Carolina Cavalry, dismounted detachment: Lieutenant William G. Roberts

== See also ==
- Charleston, South Carolina in the American Civil War
- Battle of James Island (1862), a.k.a. Battle of Secessionville
- Battle of Grimball's Landing
