= General Baird (disambiguation) =

Sir David Baird, 1st Baronet was a British Army general.

General Baird may also refer to:

- Absalom Baird (1824–1905), Union Army brigadier general and brevet major general
- Douglas Baird (Indian Army officer) (1877–1963) British Indian Army general
- George W. Baird (1839–1906), U.S. Army brigadier general
- James Baird (British Army officer) (1915–2007), British Army lieutenant general
- Mark Baird (fl. 1980s–2010s) U.S. Air Force brigadier general
- Ned Baird (1864–1956), British Army brigadier general
