= Koltes =

Koltes is a surname. Notable people with the surname include:

- Bernard-Marie Koltès (1948–1989), French playwright
- John A. Koltes (1827–1862), American colonel
