= James Island, South Carolina =

Town of James Island James Island, South Carolina
- Town
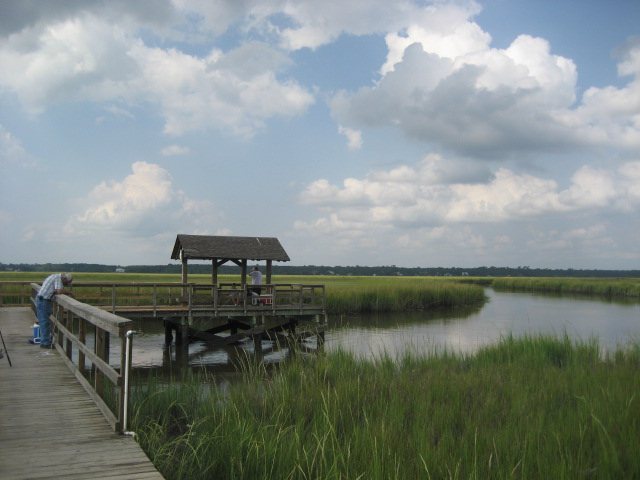
- The marshes of James Island, SC

- Location within South Carolina Location within the United States
- Coordinates: 32°43′49″N 79°57′58″W
- Country: United States
- State: South Carolina
- Counties: Charleston County
- First incorporated on: January 8, 1993
- Incorporated secondly in: 2002
- Third time incorporated in: June 2006
- Incorporated for the fourth time on: April 24, 2012

Government
  - Mayor: Brook Lyon

Area
  - Total: 4.77 sq mi (12.35 km^{2})
  - Land: 4.75 sq mi (12.29 km^{2})
  - Water: 0.027 sq mi (0.07 km^{2})
- Elevation: 10 ft (3.0 m)

Population (2020)
  - Total: 11,621
  - Density: 2,449.8/sq mi (945.89/km^{2})
- Time zone: UTC-5 (Eastern (EST))
  - Summer (DST): UTC-4 (EDT)
- Zip code: 29412
- Area codes: 843, 854
- FIPS code: 45-36430
- GNIS feature ID: 2743869
- Website: http://jamesislandsc.us/

James Island is a town in Charleston County, South Carolina, United States. It is located in the central and southern parts of James Island. James Island is included within the Charleston, South Carolina metropolitan area and the Charleston Urbanized Area.

As of the 2020 census, James Island had a population of 11,621.

== History ==
On November 14, 1782, Tadeusz Kościuszko, Colonel of the Continental Army, led the last known armed action of the Revolutionary War against the British and was nearly killed on James Island. Later, The Continental Congress named Kosciuszko Brigadier General for his service in both the North, including his tremendous assistance to General Gates at The Battle of Saratoga and brilliant efforts assisting General Greene in saving the South Region Army from Cornwallis forces and ultimately severely weakening the British under command of Cornwallis.

In the American Civil War, the Battle of Secessionville was fought on James Island.

Long settled as a semi-rural area, this island has been affected by increasing urbanization and the expansion of the city of Charleston.

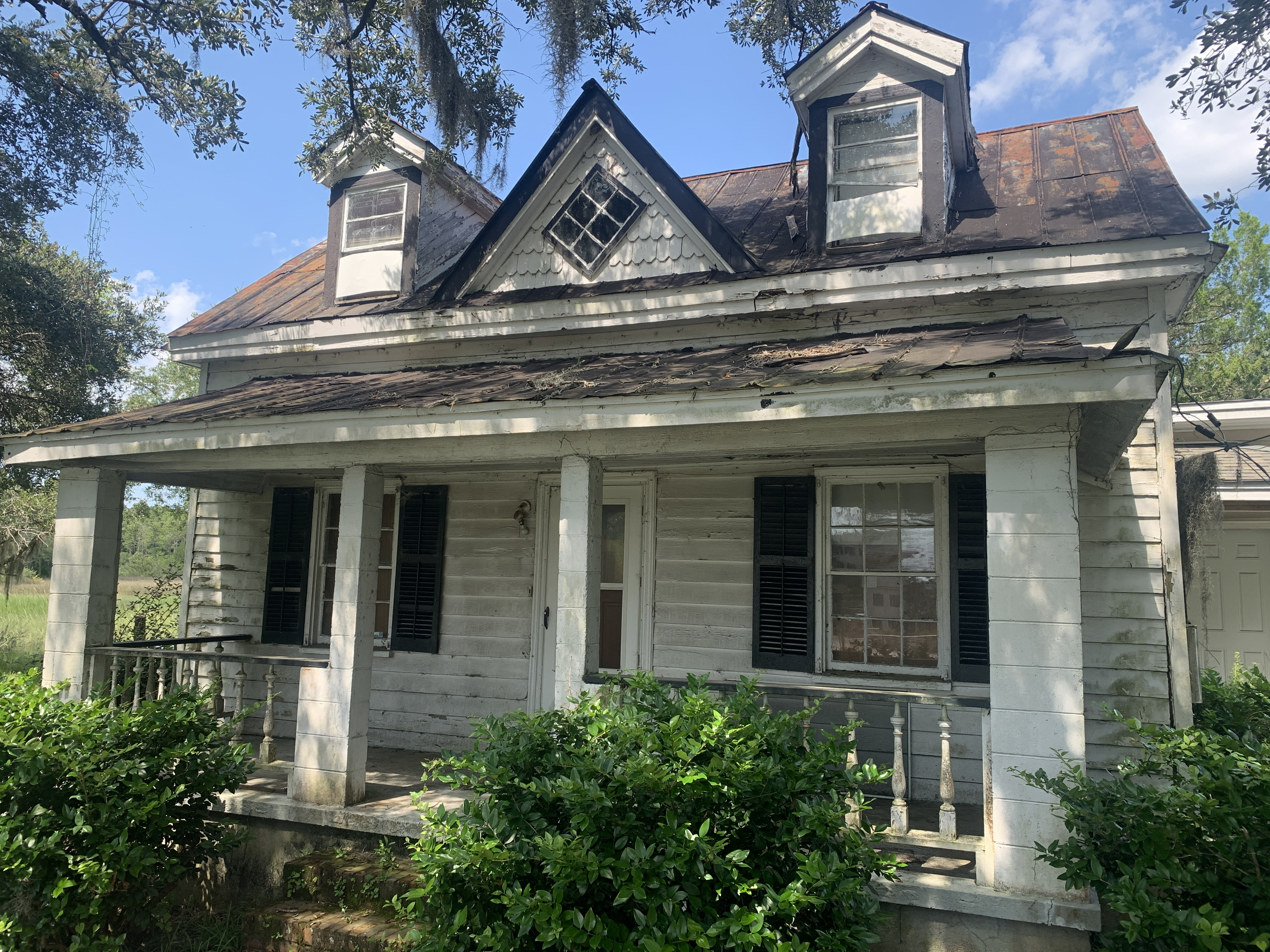
1926 Camp Road is a Reconstruction Era farmhouse and is one of the oldest buildings remaining on James Island.

Island residents incorporated the Town of James Island on January 8, 1993. Joan Sooy was elected as the first Mayor in March 1993.

A lawsuit was filed by the City of Charleston claiming that the parts of the new Town were not contiguous, being separated by salt marsh that it had already incorporated. The City of Charleston prevailed at Circuit Court and the Town appealed. The South Carolina Supreme Court ruled against the Town in 1997.

The South Carolina legislature changed incorporation law to allow incorporation over already annexed salt marsh. The Town of James Island was incorporated a second time in 2002. Mary Clark was elected Mayor.

The City of Charleston challenged the Town again, this time arguing that the new incorporation law was unconstitutional special legislation. The City of Charleston prevailed in Circuit Court and the Town of James Island appealed. The South Carolina Supreme Court ruled that the singling out "salt marsh" was irrational, the legislation was ruled unconstitutional and the Town was closed for a second time.

South Carolina changed the state laws affecting incorporation, effective on July 1, 2005. A third attempt to become a town was successful in June 2006, when about 3,000 voted to incorporate. The day after the vote, Charleston mayor Joseph P. Riley Jr. filed a lawsuit against the town for the third time, saying that it was unconstitutional. Mary Clark was elected mayor of the town for the third time in August 2006.

On November 7, 2008, the City of Charleston lost its lawsuit against the Town of James Island in Circuit Court. In an election on August 3, 2010, incumbent Clark lost to Bill Woolsey, an economics professor at The Citadel and member of the James Island Town Council from 2002 to 2004.

The South Carolina Supreme Court ruled against the Town of James Island in June 2011. It ruled that the South Carolina incorporation law used by the Town was constitutional, but that approximately 25% of the Town was not contiguous. Rather than remove that portion of the Town, it ordered the Town closed.

The Town was incorporated a fourth time after a referendum on April 24, 2012. The City of Charleston determined that it could not successfully challenge the Town by May and the deadline for a challenge passed on July 17. Former Mayor Bill Woolsey led the incorporation effort and was unopposed in the election held on July 31, 2012. He was subsequently re-elected on July 29, 2014, for a second term and again on November 5, 2019, for a third term.

The town limits have never incorporated the entire island of James Island, as the City of Charleston has annexed land on James Island before the original incorporation of the town and between subsequent re-incorporations. There were approximately 18,000 residents in what were the town boundaries and approximately 20,000 in Charleston's city limits as of the 2010 US Census. The Town currently includes a population of 11,500. Approximately 6,000 residents remain in unincorporated Charleston county, and 20,000 in the City of Charleston.

James Island is the home of many historical events and areas. McLeod Plantation, a former Sea Island cotton plantation, was sold in 2011 by Historic Charleston Foundation to the Charleston County Parks and Recreation Commission. Fort Johnson is reported to be the site of the first shot of the Civil War. The remains of Fort Lamar are nearby. Recent renovations of historical places include the Seashore Farmer's Lodge on Sol Legare Road.

The Fort Johnson/Powder Magazine, Fort Pemberton, Lighthouse Point Shell Ring (38CH12), Marshlands Plantation House, Seashore Farmers' Lodge No. 767, and Unnamed Battery No. 1 are listed on the National Register of Historic Places.

== Airport ==
The town of James Island is served by the Charleston International Airport. It is located in the City of North Charleston and is about 12 miles (20 km) northwest of James Island. It is the busiest passenger airport in South Carolina (IATA: CHS, ICAO: KCHS). The airport shares runways with the adjacent Charleston Air Force Base. Charleston Executive Airport is a smaller airport located in the John's Island section of the city of Charleston and is used by noncommercial aircraft. Both airports are owned and operated by the Charleston County Aviation Authority.

== Demographics ==
Historical population
Census	Pop.	Note	%±
1870	1,808		—
2020	11,621		—
2025 (est.)	12,660	▲	8.9%
U.S. Decennial Census

=== 2020 census ===
As of the 2020 census, James Island had a population of 11,621. The median age was 41.6 years. 20.5% of residents were under the age of 18 and 20.5% of residents were 65 years of age or older. For every 100 females there were 99.1 males, and for every 100 females age 18 and over there were 96.9 males age 18 and over.

99.3% of residents lived in urban areas, while 0.7% lived in rural areas.

There were 4,709 households in James Island, including 3,028 family households. Of all households, 29.0% had children under the age of 18 living in them. Of all households, 53.8% were married-couple households, 16.7% were households with a male householder and no spouse or partner present, and 23.2% were households with a female householder and no spouse or partner present. About 23.1% of all households were made up of individuals and 11.2% had someone living alone who was 65 years of age or older.

There were 5,035 housing units, of which 6.5% were vacant. The homeowner vacancy rate was 1.8% and the rental vacancy rate was 7.2%.

James Island racial composition
Race	Num.	Perc.
White (non-Hispanic)	9,689	83.37%
Black or African American (non-Hispanic)	1,058	9.1%
Native American	28	0.24%
Asian	75	0.65%
Pacific Islander	5	0.04%
Other/Mixed	455	3.92%
Hispanic or Latino	311	2.68%

== Notable people ==
- Stephen Colbert, comedian and television host
- Tony Elliott, University of Virginia football coach
- James Screven, brigadier general in the Revolutionary War
- Gorman Thomas, Milwaukee Brewers center fielder and designated hitter
- Roddy White, Atlanta Falcons wide receiver

== Neighborhoods ==
Neighborhoods in the town include Lynwood, White Point Estates, Stiles Point Plantation, Eastwood, Harbor Woods, Seaside Plantation, and Parrot Creek.

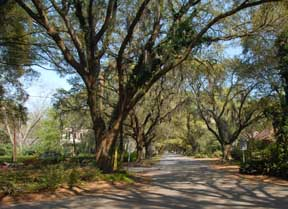
Oak trees over 100 years old line the entrance to Riverland Terrace

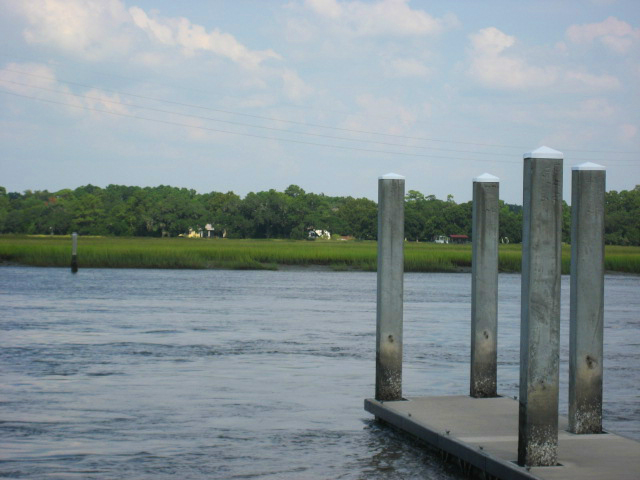
Boat landing in Riverland Terrace

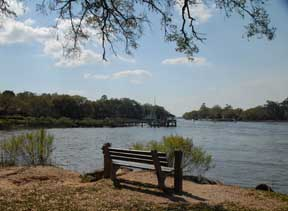
The Wappoo Cut which borders one side of neighborhood

Plymouth Park

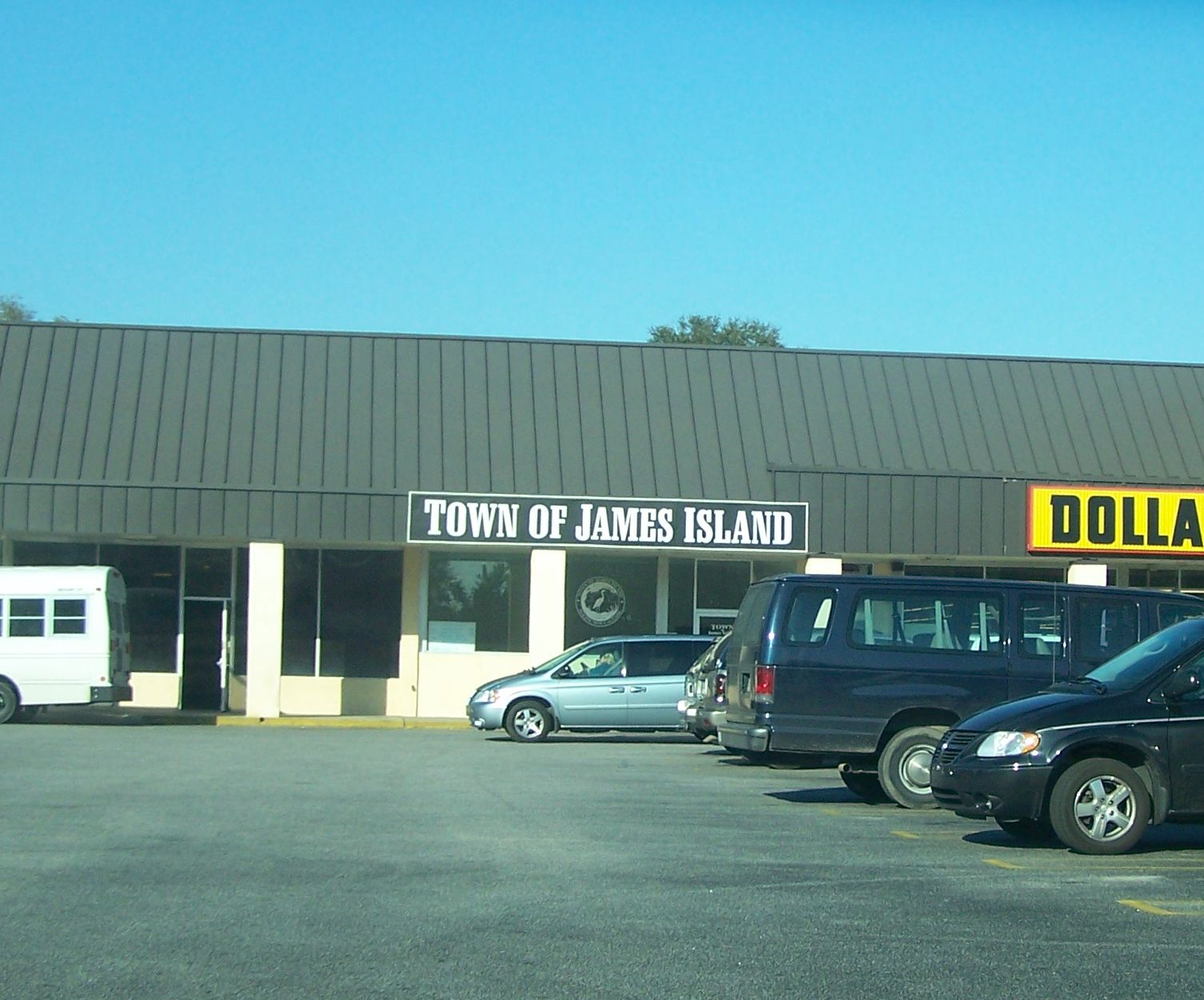
Recently remodeled Town Hall
