= Robert J. Betge =

American politician

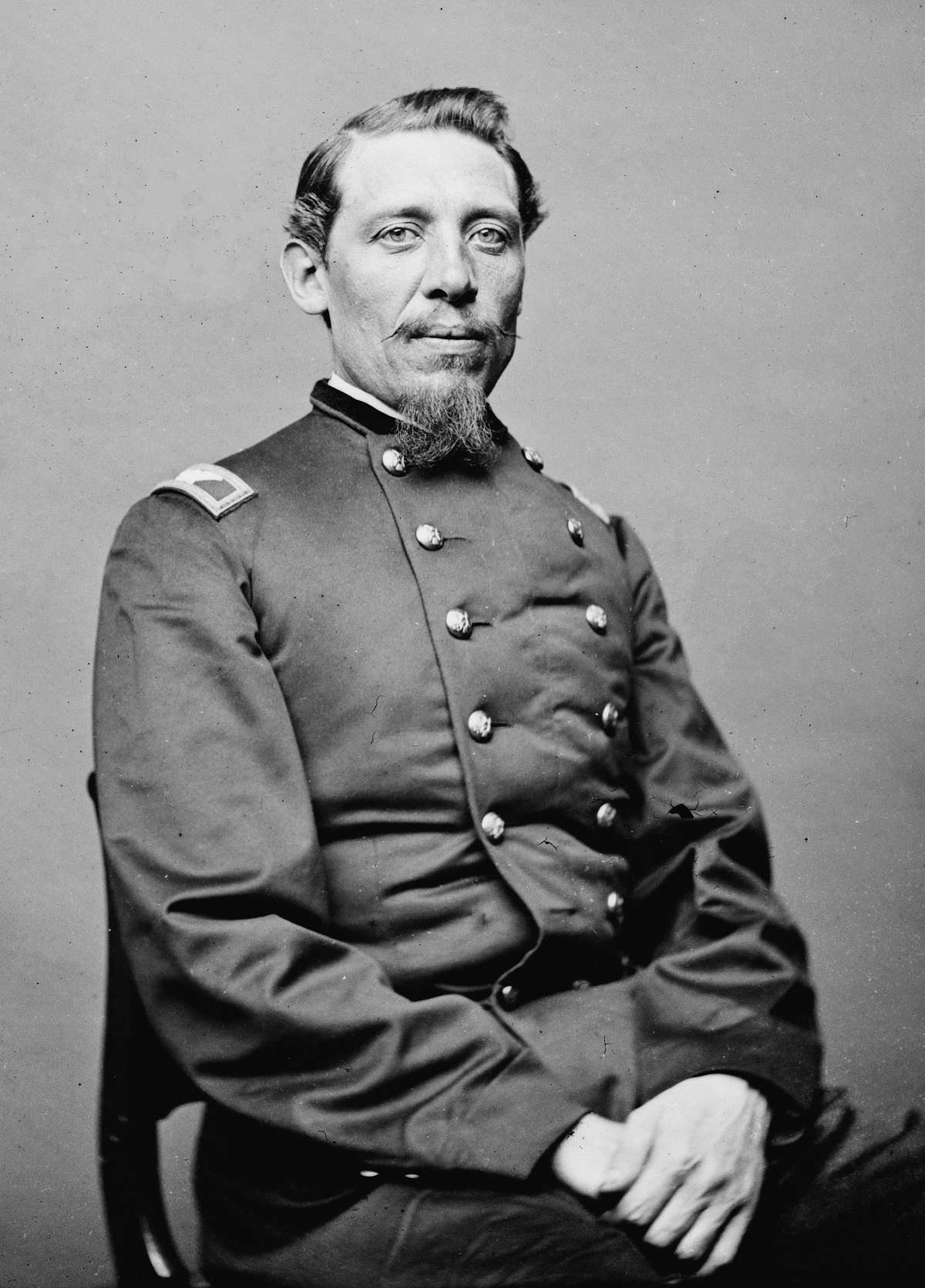
Robert J. Betge as colonel of the 68th New York

Robert Julius Betge (1824 – September 9, 1877) was a German-American politician and United States Army officer during the American Civil War.

Betge was born in Prussia and emigrated to New Jersey, where he operated a stationery store. In 1857, Betge joined the board of directors of the Hoboken Bank for Savings.

In 1861, at the outbreak of the Civil War, Betge received permission to organize the 68th New York Volunteer Infantry Regiment and was commissioned as its colonel. After entering service, he led the unit to Virginia where he was court-martialed. Found not guilty, Betge continued as colonel of the 68th New York until March 1862. That month, after protesting to his commanding general what he perceived to be mistreatment of his unit, Betge was placed under arrest. After his unit fought in the Battle of Cross Keys, he resigned his commission on August 6, 1862.

In 1866, Betge moved to San Francisco, where he continued to work as a stationer and authored a book of verse. In 1868, he was elected to the California State Senate as a Democrat. He was re-elected in 1870 and served as the Chairman of the Committee on Commerce and Navigation. He died in 1877.
