= 73rd Pennsylvania Infantry Regiment =

Union Army infantry regiment

73rd Pennsylvania Volunteer Infantry
- Active: June 1861 – July 14, 1865
- Country: United States of America
- Allegiance: Union
- Branch: Infantry
- Engagements: Battle of Cross Keys; Second Battle of Bull Run; Battle of Chancellorsville; Battle of Gettysburg; Battle of Wauhatchie; Battle of Orchard Knob; Battle of Tunnel Hill; Atlanta campaign Battle of Resaca; Battle of Dallas; Battle of New Hope Church; Battle of Allatoona; Battle of Marietta; Battle of Kennesaw Mountain; Battle of Peachtree Creek; Sherman's March to the Sea; Carolinas campaign Battle of Bentonville

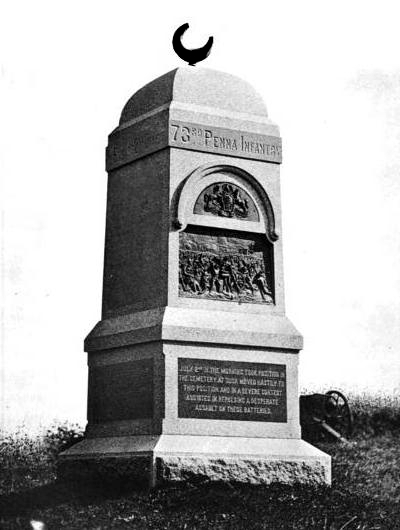
Monument to the 73rd Pennsylvania at Gettysburg

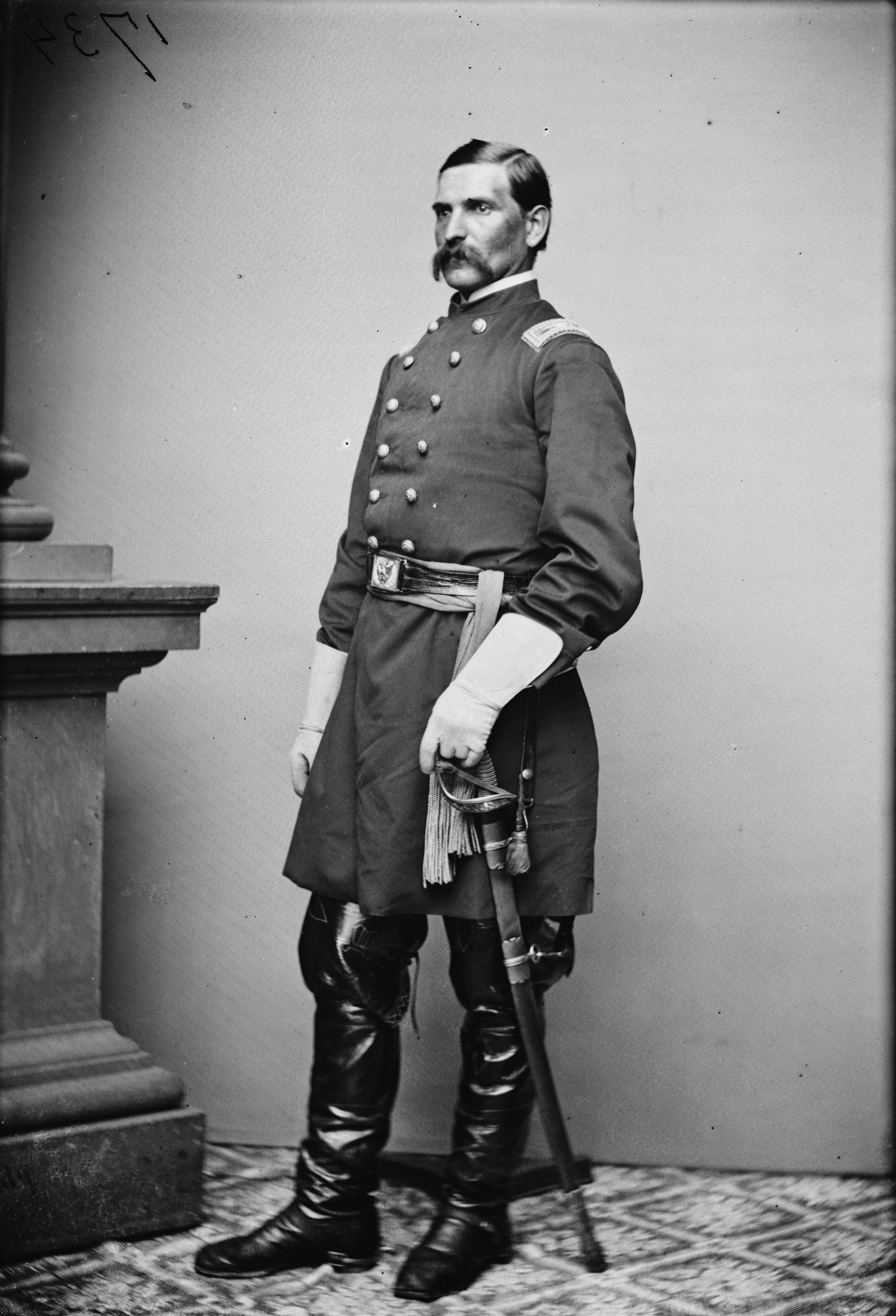
Colonel John A. Koltes

The 73rd Pennsylvania Volunteer Infantry was an infantry regiment that served in the Union Army during the American Civil War.

== Service ==
The 73rd Pennsylvania Infantry was organized at Philadelphia, Pennsylvania beginning in June 1861 and mustered in for a three year enlistment on September 19, 1861 under the command of Colonel John A. Koltes.

The regiment was attached to Steinwehr's Brigade, Blenker's Division, Army of the Potomac, to March 1862. 2nd Brigade, Blenker's Division, II Corps, Army of the Potomac, to April 1862. 2nd Brigade, Blenker's Division, Department of the Mountains, to June 1862. 2nd Brigade, 1st Division, I Corps, Army of Virginia, to September 1862. 1st Brigade, 2nd Division, XI Corps, Army of the Potomac, to October 1863, and Army of the Cumberland to April 1864. 2nd Brigade, 2nd Division, XX Corps, to July 1865.

The 73rd Pennsylvania Infantry mustered out July 14, 1865.

== Detailed service ==
Left Pennsylvania for Washington, D.C., September 24. Duty in the defenses of Washington, D.C., until March 1862. Advance on Manassas, Va., March 10–15. Near Catlett's Station, Va., until April 6. Moved to Petersburg, Va., April 6-May 11. Operations in the Shenandoah Valley until June. Battle of Cross Keys June 8. Duty in the Shenandoah Valley and at Sperryville until August. Occupation of Luray July 22. Battle of Cedar Mountain August 9 (reserve). Pope's campaign in northern Virginia August 16-September 2. Fords of the Rappahannock August 21–23. Sulphur Springs August 24. Gainesville August 28. Groveton August 30. Bull Run August 30. Duty in the defenses of Washington, D.C., until November. Movement to Centreville November 1–19, then to Fredericksburg December 9–16. "Mud March" January 20–24, 1863. At Stafford Court House until April 27. Operations at Welford's, Kelly's, and Beverly Fords April 14–15. Chancellorsville Campaign April 27-May 6. Battle of Chancellorsville May 1–5. Gettysburg Campaign June 11-July 24. Battle of Gettysburg July 1–3. Pursuit of Lee July 5–24. Guard duty along Orange & Alexandria Railroad until September. Movement to Bridgeport, Ala., September 24-October 3. Operations in Lookout Valley October 19–26. Reopening Tennessee River October 26–29. Battle of Wauhatchie, Tenn., October 28–29. Chattanooga-Ringgold Campaign November 23–27. Battles of Orchard Knob November 23 and Tunnel Hill November 24–25. Mostly captured November 25 at Tunnel Hill. Duty in Lookout Valley until May 1864. Atlanta Campaign May 1-September 8. Demonstration on Rocky Faced Ridge May 8–11. Dug Gap or Mill Creek May 8. Battle of Resaca May 14–15. Near Cassville May 19. New Hope Church May 25. Operations on line of Pumpkin Vine Creek and battles about Dallas, New Hope Church, and Allatoona Hills May 26-June 5. Operations about Marietta and against Kennesaw Mountain June 10-July 2. Pine Hill June 11–14. Lost Mountain June 15–17. Gilgal or Golgotha Church June 15. Muddy Creek June 17. Noyes Creek June 19. Kolb's Farm June 22. Assault on Kenesaw June 27. Ruff's Station or Smyrna Camp Ground July 4. Chattahoochie River July 5–17. Peachtree Creek July 19–20. Siege of Atlanta July 22-August 25. Operations at Chattahoochie River Bridge August 26-September 2. Occupation of Atlanta September 2-November 15. Expedition to Tuckum's Cross Roads October 26–29. Near Atlanta November 9. March to the sea November 15-December 10. Siege of Savannah December 10–21. Carolinas Campaign January to April 1865. Averysboro, N.C., March 16. Battle of Bentonville March 19–21. Occupation of Goldsboro March 24. Advance on Raleigh April 9–13. Occupation of Raleigh April 14. Bennett's House April 26. Surrender of Johnston and his army. March to Washington, D.C., via Richmond, Va., April 29-May 20. Grand Review of the Armies May 24. Duty in the defenses of Washington until July.

== Casualties ==
The regiment lost a total of 216 men during service; 5 officers and 98 enlisted men killed or mortally wounded, 113 enlisted men died of disease.

== Commanders ==
- Colonel John A. Koltes - killed in action at the Second Battle of Bull Run while commanding the brigade
- Colonel Gustavus A. Muehleck - resigned January 27, 1863
- Lieutenant Colonel William Moore - promoted to colonel but never mustered at that rank; resigned February 8, 1864 due to wounds received in action at the Battle of Chancellorsville
- Lieutenant Colonel Joseph B. Taft - temporarily assigned on November 22, 1863 from the 143rd New York Infantry to command after the regiment had no remaining field officers; killed in action at the Battle of Missionary Ridge
- Lieutenant Colonel Charles C. Cresson
- Captain Augustus Brueckner - commanded at the Second Battle of Bull Run; killed in action there
- Captain Daniel F. Kelly - commanded at the Battle of Gettysburg and the Battle of Missionary Ridge where he was captured while in command of the regiment
- 1st Lieutenant Samuel D. Miller - commanded at the Battle of Missionary Ridge after Cpt Kelly was captured

== See also ==
- List of Pennsylvania Civil War Units
- Pennsylvania in the Civil War
