= Lighthouse Point Shell Ring (38CH12) =

Archaeological site in South Carolina, US

- U.S. National Register of Historic Places
- Nearest city: James Island, South Carolina
- Area: 1.5 acres (0.61 ha)
- MPS: Late Archaic--Early Woodland Period Shell Rings of South Carolina MPS
- NRHP reference No.: 90001505
- Added to NRHP: October 14, 1990

Lighthouse Point Shell Ring (38CH12), also known as Parrot's Point Shell Ring, is a historic mound located on James Island, Charleston County, South Carolina. It is one of 20 or more prehistoric shell rings located from the central coast of South Carolina to the central coast of Georgia. The midden contains a diverse array of biota.

It was listed on the National Register of Historic Places in 1990.
