= James Island (South Carolina) =

Island in South Carolina, United States

Coordinates: 32°43′40″N 79°57′20″W

- Interactive map of James Island

Geography
- Location: Atlantic Ocean

Administration
- United States

Additional information
- Time zone: Eastern Time Zone
- Official website: http://www.jamesislandsc.us/

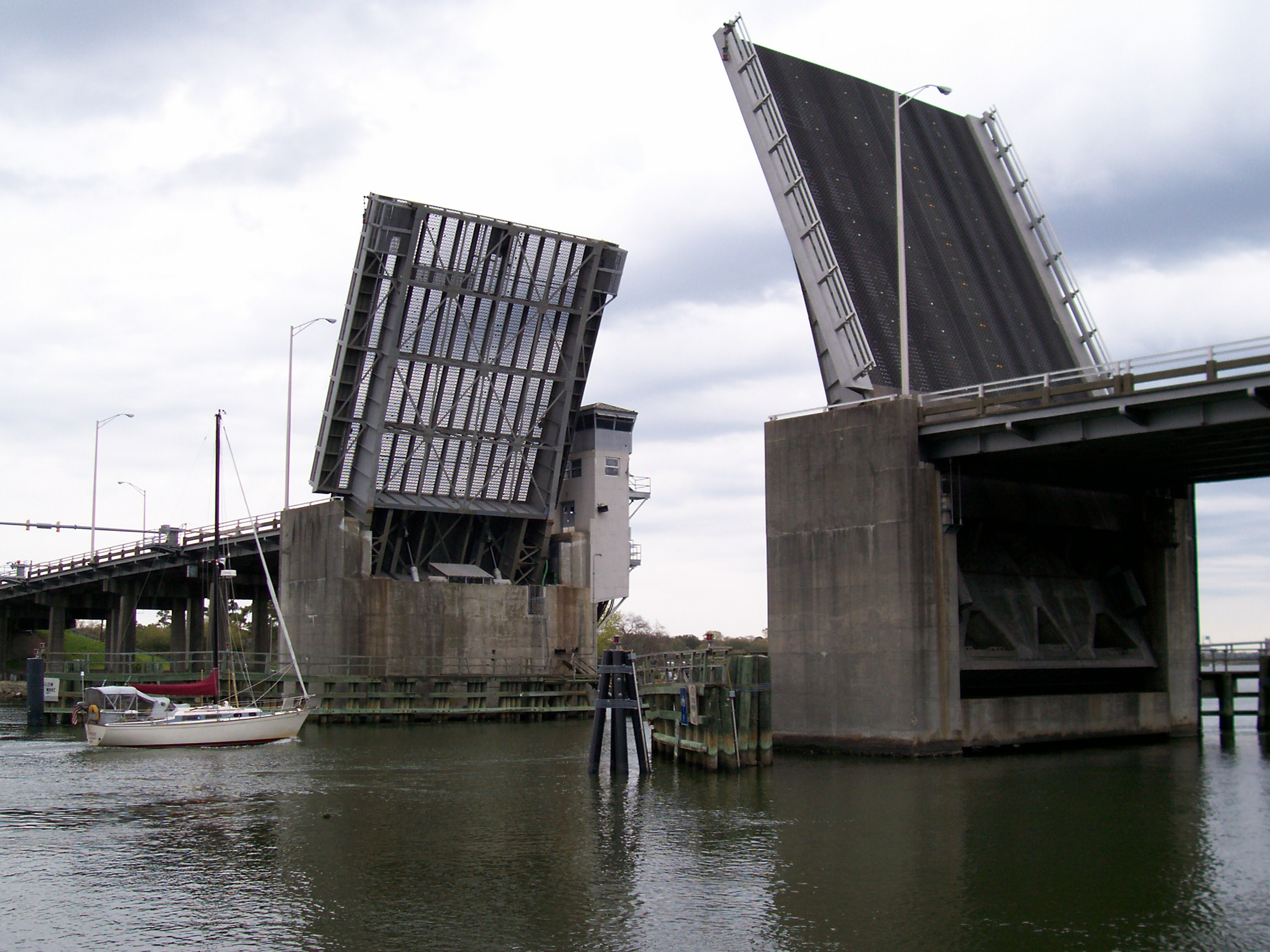
Drawbridge over Wappoo Creek leading to James Island

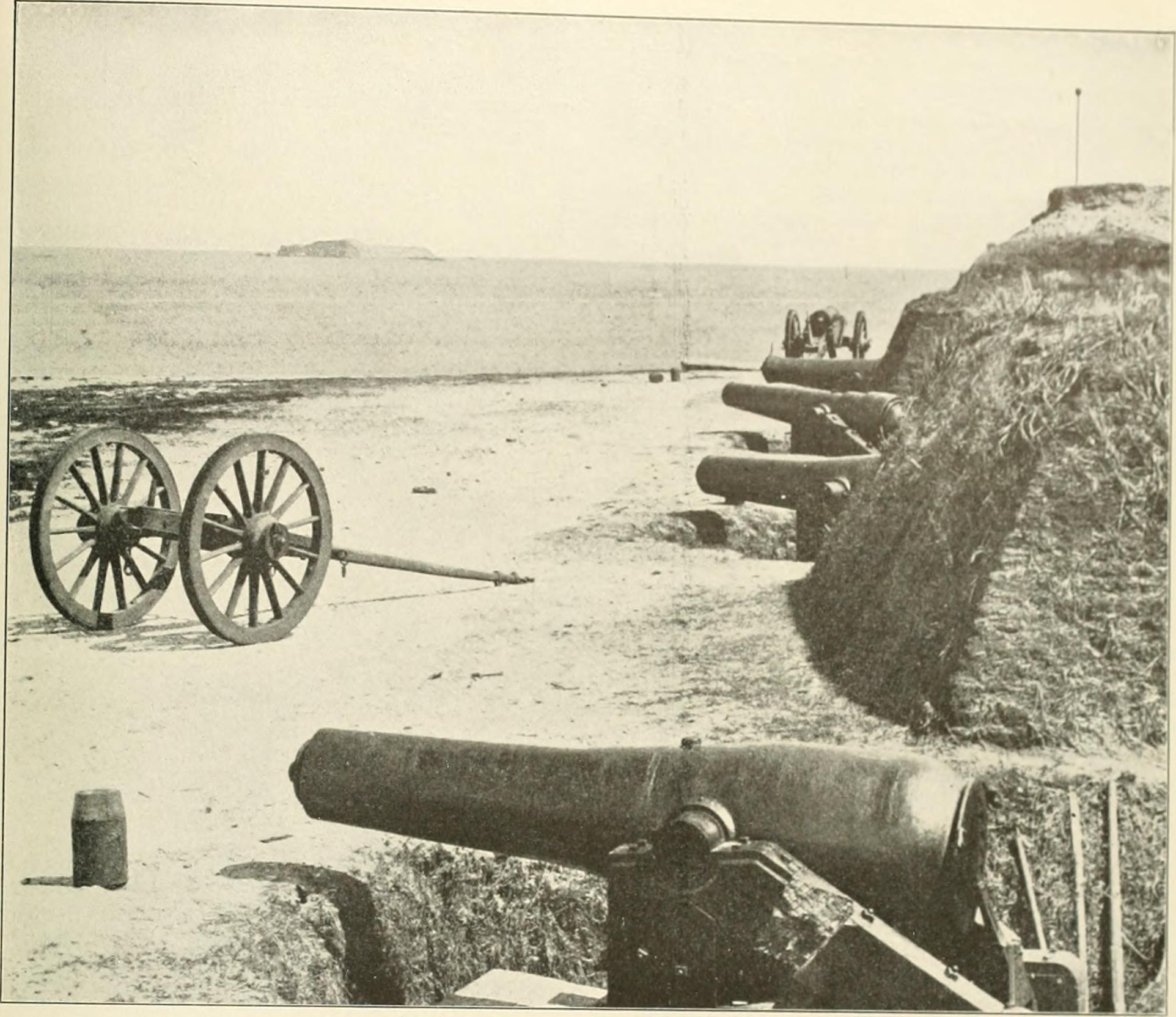
Fort Johnson, with Fort Sumter in background

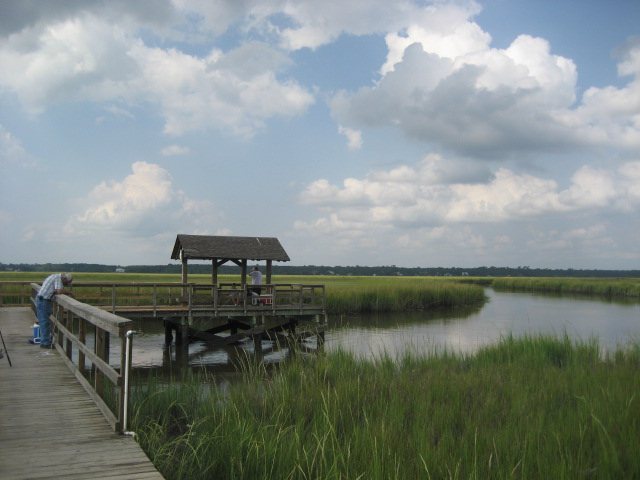
Dock with surrounding marshes on James Island

James Island is an island in South Carolina off the coast of Charleston. The island is separated from Charleston by the Ashley River. About one-half of the island lies within the city limits of Charleston, and the remainder of the island is made up of the Town of James Island and unincorporated areas. The island has a population of approximately 35,000 people. Several Civil War skirmishes took place on the island.

== Geography ==
James Island is one of South Carolina's most urban Sea Islands. Nearly half of the island sits within Charleston city limits. The island is separated from peninsular downtown Charleston by the Ashley River, from the mainland by Wappoo Creek and the Wappoo Cut, and from Johns Island by the Stono River. It lies inshore of Morris Island and Folly Beach.

== History ==
Fort Sumter, located on an island just off the eastern tip of James Island, was the site of the first battle of the Civil War. Bombardment of Fort Sumter was started from Fort Johnson which is located on the eastern portion of James Island.

Several significant military engagements took place on island, including the battles of Secessionville (1862), Grimball's Landing (1863) and Grimball's Causeway (1865). All of these battles were alternately known as the "Battle of James Island".

James Island land was long largely agricultural with Sea Island cotton forced-labor farms covering much of the island. Growth accelerated after World War II and James Island became a suburban bedroom community to Charleston.

== Administrative boundaries ==
There has been political discord concerning the incorporation of portions of the island into the City of Charleston. The town of James Island has been founded on three occasions. Three incorporations were overturned as a result of legal suits filed by Charleston. The third incorporation attempt was in contention in another legal suit by the city, and on November 7, 2008, the town's incorporation was upheld by a Circuit Court judge. The city of Charleston filed an appeal of the decision to the South Carolina Supreme Court. Ultimately, this ruling was overturned by the Supreme Court.

A fourth attempt at incorporation was successful, upheld by the courts and uncontested by the city of Charleston. There is now a legally formed Town of James Island.

As defined by the U.S. Census Bureau, the population of James Island is included within the Charleston-North Charleston Urbanized Area and the larger Charleston-North Charleston Metropolitan Statistical Area.

== Population ==
As of the 2000 census, the United States Census Bureau reported that 33,781 people lived on the island. About one-half of the island lies within the city limits of Charleston, and the remainder of the island is made up of the Town of James Island and unincorporated areas.

== Education ==
The public schools on James Island are part of the Charleston County School District and include Harborview, Stiles Point, James Island and Murray-LaSaine, and Apple Charter Elementary Schools; Camp Road Middle School, and James Island Charter High School. The high school interscholastic teams are the Trojans and wear blue and orange uniforms.

James Island had two high schools in the past: Fort Johnson High (mascot Trojans) and James Island High (mascot Rams). The two schools merged in 1983 on the Fort Johnson campus. The first school year for the combined school was 1983-1984 (class of '84).

== Notable inhabitants ==
- Stephen Colbert, comedian and political satirist, lived on James Island for part of his boyhood, along with his 10 brothers and sisters.
- Langston Moore of the NFL Detroit Lions, attended James Island High School.
- Samuel Smalls, the man upon whom the novel Porgy and subsequent opera Porgy and Bess are based, is buried in the cemetery beside James Island Presbyterian Church.
- Gorman Thomas, Major League Baseball player, grew up on James Island and played baseball for the original James Island High School.
- Roddy White, Pro Bowl wide receiver with the Atlanta Falcons, attended James Island High School.
