= John A. Koltes =

American colonel

John Albert Koltes
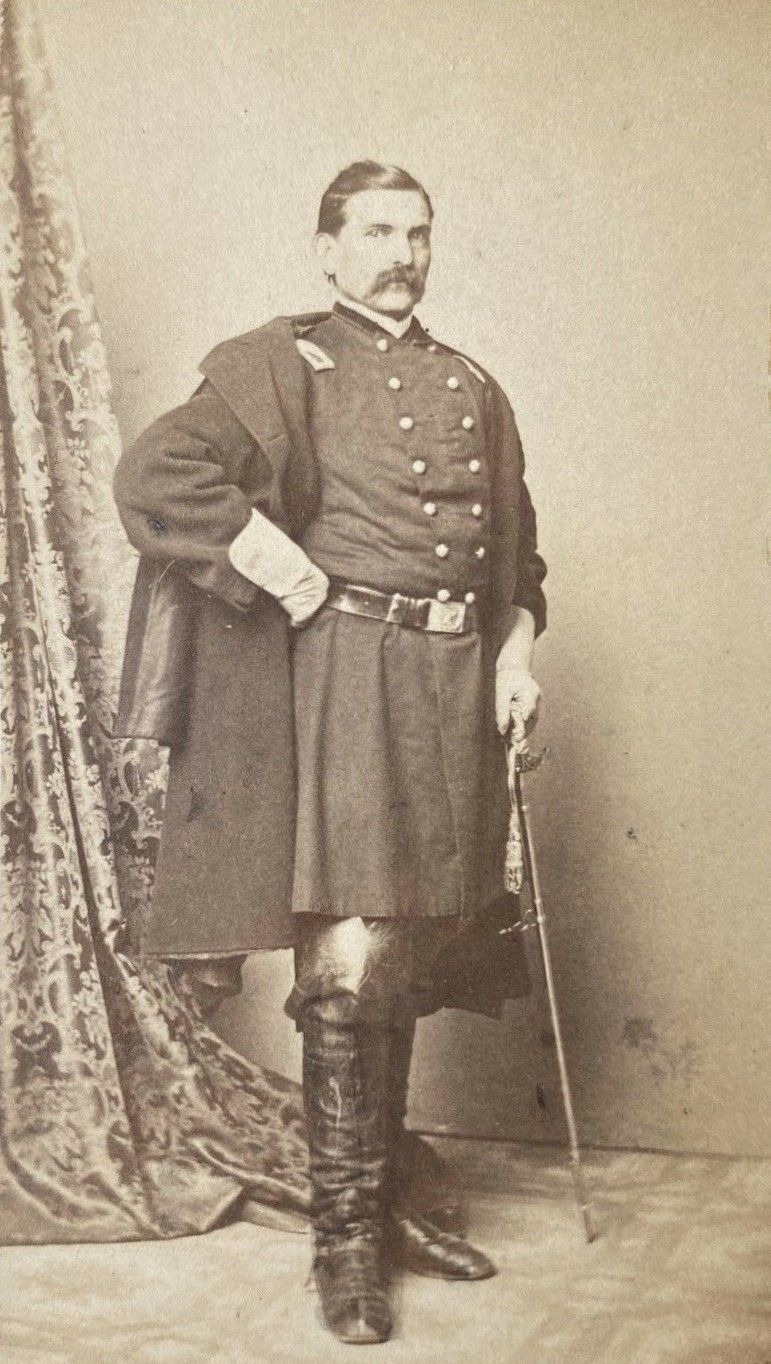
- Born: 1827; Trier, Westphalia, Prussia
- Died: August 30, 1862 (aged 34–35); Manassas, Virginia, United States
- Burial place: Glenwood Memorial Gardens, Broomall, Pennsylvania, United States
- Military career
- Allegiance: German Empire; United States (Union)
- Branch: United States Army (Union Army)
- Service years: 1846 – 1862
- Rank: Colonel
- Commands: 73rd Pennsylvania Infantry Regiment; 41st New York Infantry Regiment
- Conflicts: Mexican–American War; German revolutions of 1848–1849; American Civil War: Northern Virginia Campaign; Second Battle of Bull Run †

John Albert Koltes (1827 – August 30, 1862) was an American colonel of German origin who commanded the 73rd Pennsylvania Infantry Regiment during the American Civil War before being killed at the Second Battle of Bull Run.

== Biography ==
=== Early years ===
John was born at Trier in 1827 before emigrating to the United States at the age of 17 to Pittsburgh as a temporary teacher at a Catholic school before enlisting in the Mexican–American War until he was discharged at Philadelphia. He then served as a member of the U.S. Marines at the U.S. Mint in Philadelphia.

=== American Civil War ===
When the American Civil War broke out, Koltes mobilized the Maennerchor Rifle Guards around April 1861 before helping to muster the 73rd Pennsylvania Infantry Regiment and the regiment began training at Lemon Hill at the Eagle and Wolf hills where the 73rd Pennsylvania would often enjoy picnics. The 73rd Pennsylvania was then assigned to General Ludwig Blenker's division of the Army of the Potomac and would then serve at the Northern Virginia Campaign.

=== Second Battle of Bull Run ===
Koltes was ordered to assume command of the 41st New York Infantry Regiment after Julius Stahel was too far to effectively command it as well as the 41st New York being stationed all the way at Chinn Ridge. When Koltes came up to the ridge, he noticed remnants of Nathan G. Evans's South Carolina brigade, the 11th Mississippi Infantry Regiment and some of James L. Kemper's men and were threatening his right flank. Koltes then retreated the 73rd Pennsylvania and the 41st New York. However, after Captain J. B. Richardson's artillery began showering the Union Army with projecticles, Kotles dashed out, feeling compelled to take action and was described as "waving his sword high in the air" and ordered a charge on the Confederate artillery due to the surrounding infantry being confused but when a cannon launched a shell, it stuck some of his men along with Koltes himself, mortally wounding him before the charge could gain any momentum. At this point, Koltes had been acting brigadier general in General Adolph Von Steinwehr's division for four months, and his friends who had secured his promotion to Colonel managed to carry his body away and bury him at Glenwood Memorial Gardens, leaving his wife and four children. Koltes was posthumously praised by Carl Schurz and Franz Sigel for his service during the battle.
