= Seashore Farmers' Lodge No. 767 =

- U.S. National Register of Historic Places
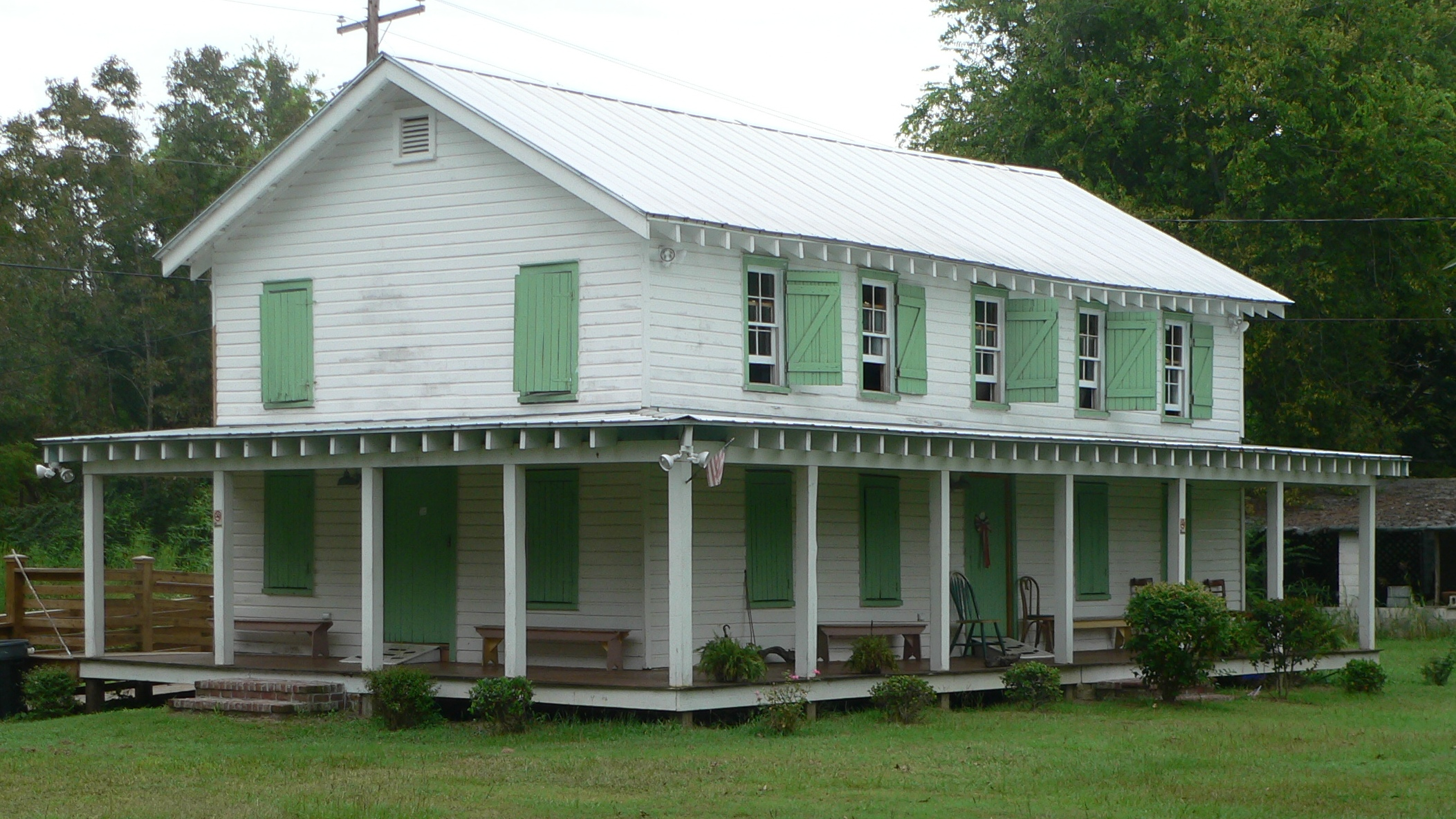

- Location within South Carolina Location within the United States
- Location: Northeastern corner of the junction of Sol Legare and Old Sol Legare Rds.
- Coordinates: 32°40′54″N 79°58′02″W
- Built: c. 1915
- Architectural style: Vernacular
- NRHP reference No.: 07001043
- Added to NRHP: October 3, 2007

The Seashore Farmers' Lodge No. 767 is an historic building in coastal South Carolina that was erected to house a fraternal lodge for African Americans. The Lodge was built about 1915 by local black farmers. Their organization provided insurance, advice, and burial assistance to members, and the structure was the headquarters for the outfit. In 1953, a new pavilion opened at nearby Mosquito Beach, and the Lodge fell into disuse.

== Restoration and recognition ==
In 2007, the Lodge had been vacant for a decade and was in near ruinous condition. The Town of James Island agreed to contribute $50,000 toward the restoration of the building. In 2009, a restoration of the Lodge was undertaken at a cost of about $100,000 including the recreation of a missing porch. The Lodge was added to the National Register on October 3, 2007, as a significant illustration of the importance of fraternal orders in the cultural life of the lowcountry African-American community in the early twentieth century.

The Lodge has a lateral gable roof of raised-seam tin with exposed rafters, wood clapboarding, concrete piers, and windows with wooden full-panel shutters as simple openings.
