= Unnamed Battery No. 1 =

- U.S. National Register of Historic Places
- Location within South Carolina Location within the United States
- Location: Clark's Point, James Island, South Carolina
- Coordinates: 32°43′15″N 79°56′7″W
- Area: 1 acre (0.40 ha)
- Built: 1862
- MPS: Civil War Defenses of Charleston TR
- NRHP reference No.: 82003838
- Added to NRHP: August 11, 1982

Unnamed Battery No. 1 is an historic artillery battery located at Clark's Point, James Island, Charleston County, South Carolina. It was built in 1862 and was the southern end of the eastern James Island line. At the end of the war, this battery mounted two field guns. The earthen redoubt measures approximately 240 feet long and 200 feet wide. It has a 12 foot high parapet wall and a powder magazine about 17 feet in height.

It was listed on the National Register of Historic Places in 1982.
