= Marshlands Plantation House =

Historic house in South Carolina, United States

- U.S. National Register of Historic Places
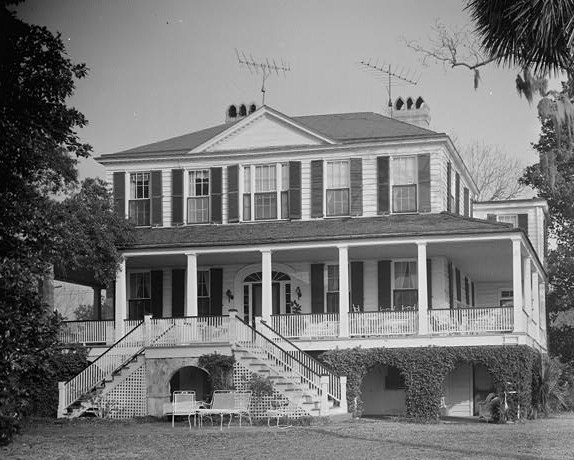

- Location within South Carolina Location within the United States
- Location: 217 Ft. Johnson Road, Charleston, South Carolina
- Coordinates: 32°45′01″N 79°54′03″W
- Built: 1810
- Architectural style: Federal
- NRHP reference No.: 73001700
- Added to NRHP: March 30, 1973

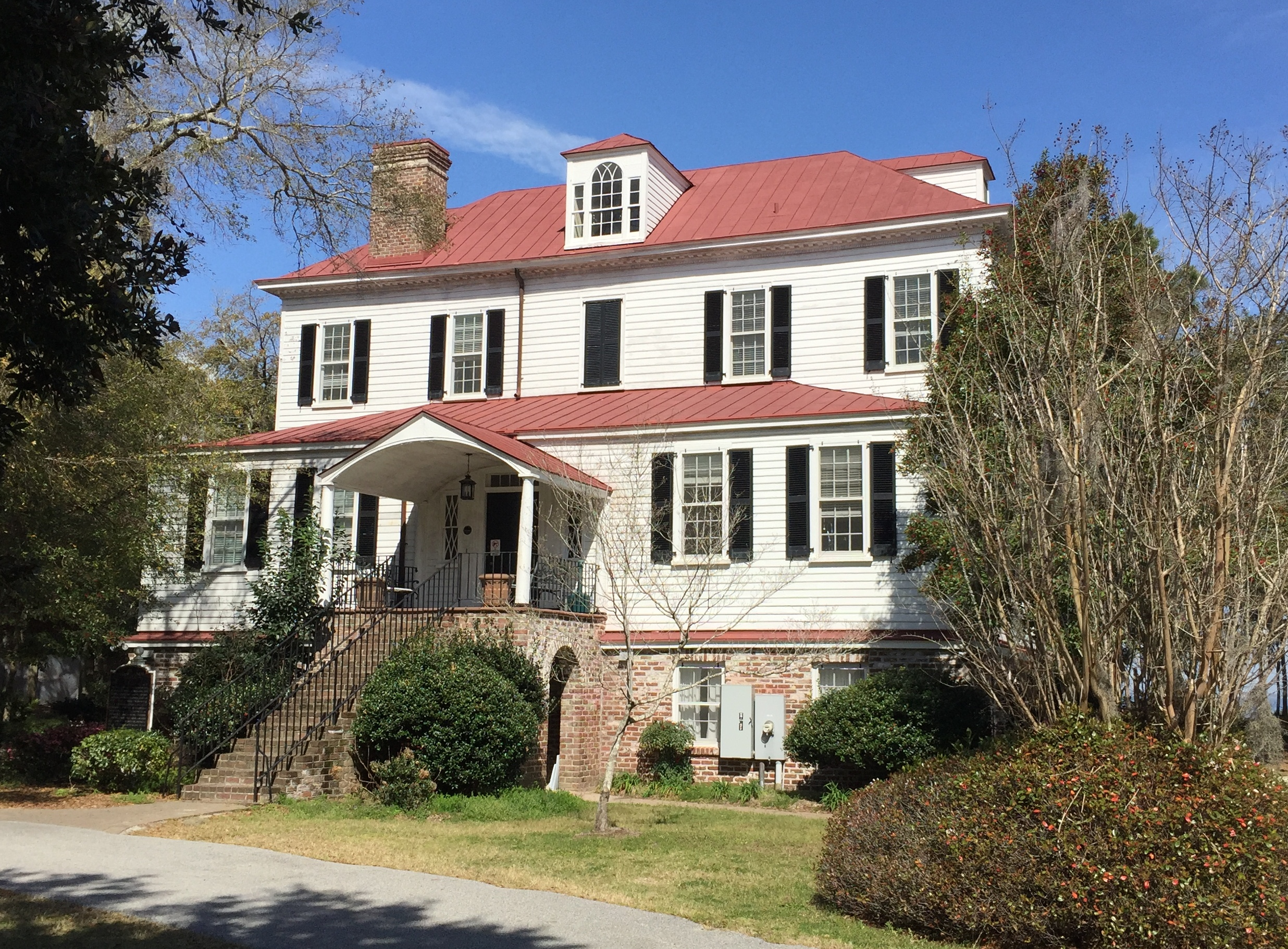
The landward side of Marshlands Plantation House is shown here at its new location on James Island.

Marshlands Plantation House, in Charleston, South Carolina, is an historic plantation house that was built in 1810 and listed in the National Register of Historic Places on March 30, 1973. It is a 2 1/2-story Federal-style plantation home. The house was relocated in the 1960s from its original location on the site of the United States Navy Shipyard. The Navy had announced it would have to demolish the empty house if it could not be relocated with the $15,000 the Navy had set aside for the purpose. The City of Charleston took temporary possession of the house, transferring it to the College of Charleston which relocated it for preservation to James Island.
