= 54th New York Infantry Regiment =

- Active: August 30, 1861 - April 14, 1866
- Country: United States
- Allegiance: Union
- Branch: Union Army
- Type: Infantry
- Nickname: "Schwarze Yaeger" or "Hiram Barney Rifles"
- Engagements: Battle of Cross Keys; Second Battle of Bull Run; Battle of Chancellorsville; Battle of Gettysburg; Second Battle of Charleston Harbor; Battle of Grimball's Causeway

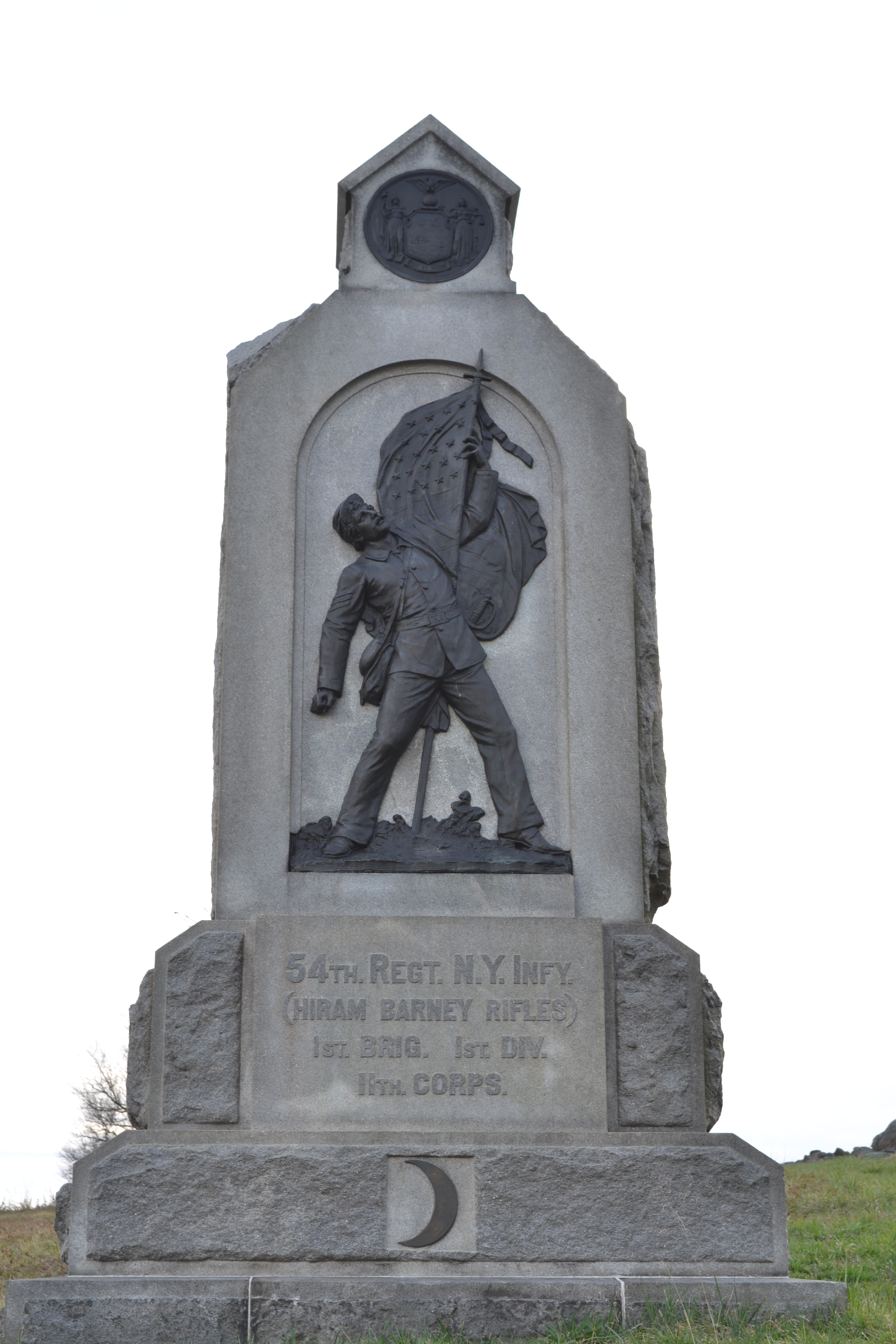
Monument to the 54th New York Infantry at Gettysburg National Military Park

The 54th New York Infantry Regiment (a.k.a. "Schwarze Yaeger" or "Hiram Barney Rifles") was an infantry regiment in the Union Army during the American Civil War.

== Service ==
The 54th New York Infantry was organized in Hudson, New York beginning August 30, 1861 and mustered in September 5, 1861 through October 16, 1861 under the command of Colonel Eugene A. Kozlay.

The regiment was attached to Provisional Brigade, Casey's Division, Army of the Potomac, to December 1861. Steinwehr's Brigade, Blenker's Division, Army of the Potomac, to March 1862. Steinwehr's 2nd Brigade, Blenker's 2nd Division, II Corps, Army of the Potomac, to April 1862. 2nd Brigade, Blenker's Division, Department of the Mountains, to June 1862. 2nd Brigade, 3rd Division, I Corps, Army of Virginia, to September 1862. 2nd Brigade, 3rd Division, XI Corps, Army of the Potomac, to November 1862. 1st Brigade, 1st Division, XI Corps, to August 1863. 1st Brigade, Gordon's Division, Folly Island, South Carolina, X Corps, Department of the South, to April 1864. Folly Island, South Carolina, Northern District, Department of the South, to October 1864. 1st Separate Brigade, Morris Island, South Carolina, Department of the South, to July 1865. 3rd Sub-District, Department of the South, to August 1865. 1st Brigade, Department of the South, to April 1866.

== Detailed service ==
Left New York for Washington, D.C., October 29. 1861. Duty in the defenses of Washington, D.C., until April 1862. Movement to Winchester, Va., April 5–18. Operations in the Shenandoah Valley until June. Battle of Cross Keys June 8. At Sperryville July 7 to August 8. Battle of Cedar Mountain August 9. Pope's Campaign in northern Virginia August 16-September 2. Fords of the Rappahannock August 20–23. Sulphur Springs August 26–27. Battle of Groveton August 29. Second Battle of Bull Run August 30. Duty in the defenses of Washington. D.C., until November. Movement to Centreville November 1–19. Waterloo Bridge November 7. Reconnaissance to Snicker's Ferry and Berryville November 28–30. Movement to Fredericksburg December 9–15. "Mud March" January 20–24, 1863. At Stafford Court House until April 27. Chancellorsville Campaign April 27-May 6. Battle of Chancellorsville May 1–5. Gettysburg Campaign June 11-July 24. Battle of Gettysburg July 1–3. Ordered to the Department of the South August 1. Siege of Forts Wagner and Gregg, Morris Island, and operations against Fort Sumter and Charleston August 9-September 7. Operations against Charleston and duty on Folly and Morris Islands, S.C., until June 1865. Expedition to John's and Islands February 6–14, 1864. James Island and October 24, 1864. Santee River February, serving duty in the District of South Carolina, Department of the South, until April 1866.

== Casualties ==
The regiment lost a total of 142 men during service; 2 officers and 38 enlisted men killed or mortally wounded, 1 officer and 101 enlisted men died of disease.

== Commanders ==
- Colonel Eugene A. Kozlay
- Lieutenant Colonel Charles Ashby - commanded at the Second Battle of Bull Run and at the Battle of Chancellorsville where he was captured
- Major Stephen Kovacs - commanded at the Battle of Chancellorsville after Ltc Ashby was captured; commanded at the Battle of Gettysburg where he was captured on July 1
- Lieutenant Ernst Both - commanded at the Battle of Gettysburg after Maj Kovacs was captured

== See also ==
- List of New York Civil War regiments
- New York in the Civil War
