= 41st New York Infantry Regiment =

- Active: June 6-9, 1861 to December 9, 1865
- Country: United States
- Allegiance: Union
- Branch: Infantry
- Nickname: The De Kalb Regiment
- Engagements: Siege of Yorktown (1862): Williamsburg; Seven Days Battles; Antietam; Chancellorsville; Battle of Gettysburg; Mine Run; Wilderness; Spotsylvania Courthouse; Cedar Creek; Cold Harbor; Petersburg; Five Forks; Appomattox

Commanders
- Colonel: Leopold von Gilsa

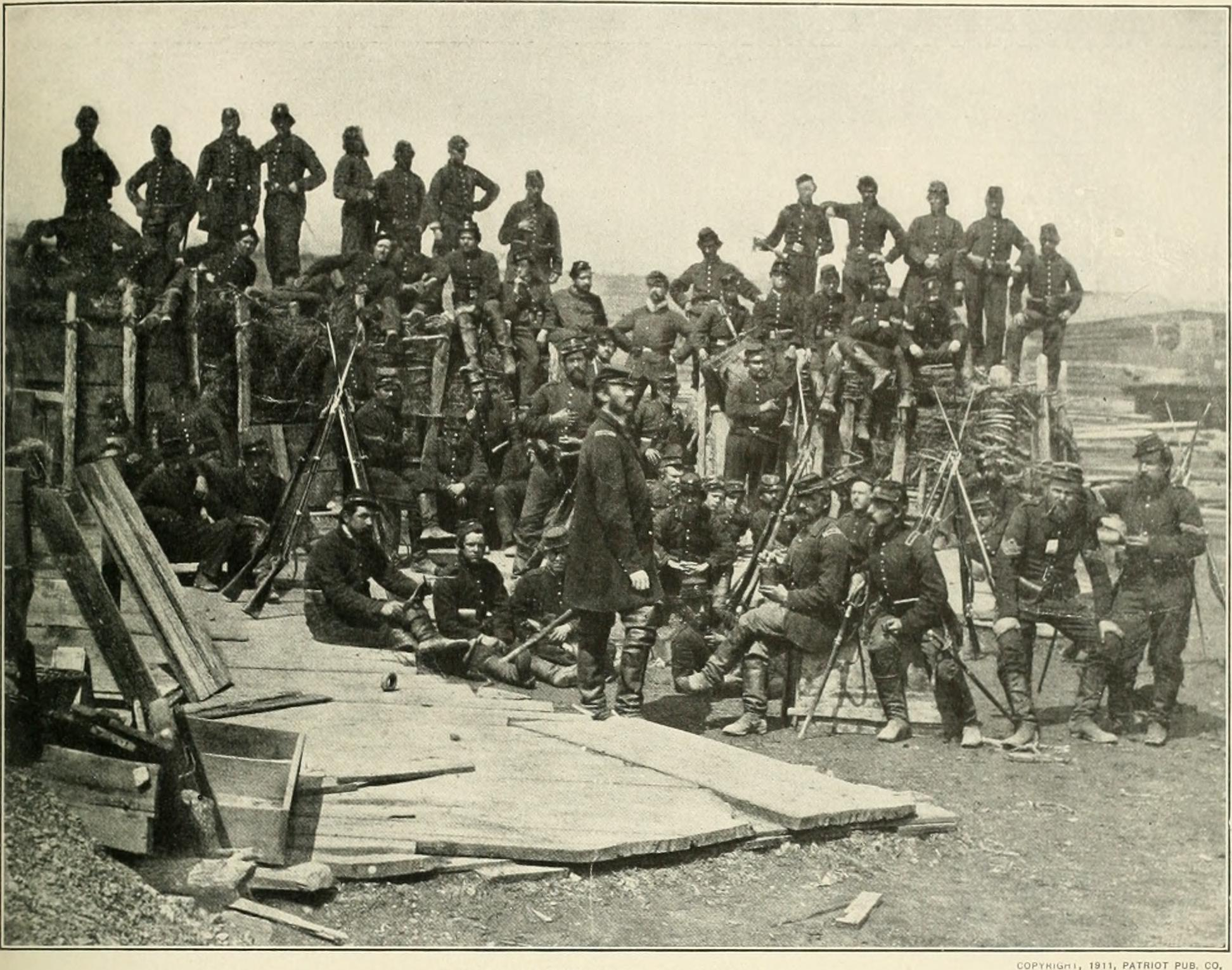
41st New York after the Second Battle of Bull Run, August 30, 1862

The 41st New York Infantry Regiment also nicknamed the "De Kalb Regiment" or the "Second Yager Regiment" was an infantry regiment that served in the American Civil War. The regiment was formed from German immigrants from both New York and Pennsylvania.

== Service ==
The regiment was organized in New York City, composed of German immigrants who previously served in the Prussian Army during the First Schleswig War, and was mustered into service on June 6-9, 1861, for three years' service

About a month later, the regiment, now having over 1,041 men, left the state and moved to Washington, D.C., arriving there on July 10, and subsequently crossing the Potomac River into Virginia on July 16. The regiment would be present at the First Battle of Bull Run (July 21, 1861), but wasn't engaged, and the 41st subsequently marched back to Washington, D.C, stationed there until July 25.

The regiment was mustered out of service on December 9, 1865.

== Uniform ==
Initially, the regiment wore a uniform that was based on the Jaeger uniform of Germany. It consisted of a dark green frock coat with red trimming and cuff flaps, dark green pants with a red stripe down the leg, a dark green kepi with a red band, and black shoes. In addition to the Jaeger uniform, Company K of the regiment wore a French/American zouave uniform. This uniform consisted of a dark blue zouave jacket with red trimmings, dark blue pantaloons with red braiding, a sky blue sash, a dark blue zouave vest with red trimming, a red tasseled fez with a thin yellow band around it. Dark blue Zouave pantaloons were worn with a red stripe on the outseam tucked into deerskin jambières, and white gaiters made from canvas or drill.

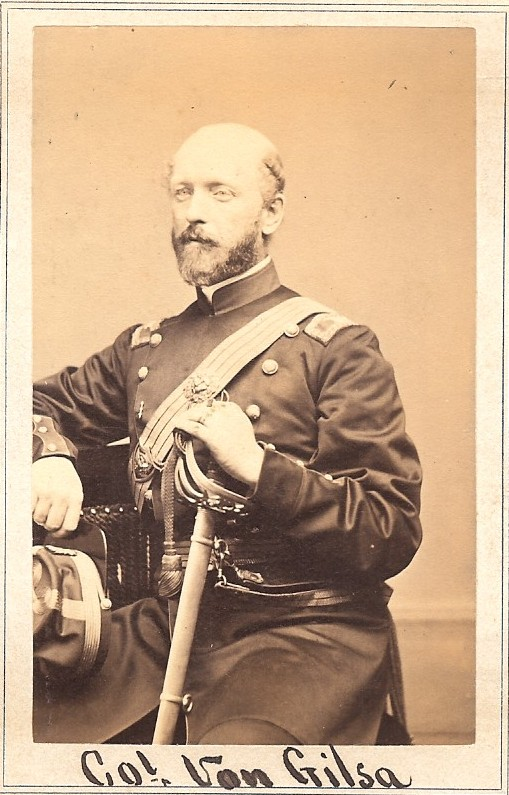
41st NYVIR Colonel Leopold von Gilsa

== See also ==
- List of New York Civil War units
