= John Grimball =

U.S. Army Officer

First Lieutenant John Grimball (March 10, 1914 – April 8, 1991) of Charleston, South Carolina, a young lawyer from Columbia, South Carolina, was commanding officer of Company A, 14th Tank Battalion during the battle to capture the Ludendorff Bridge over the Rhine on March 7, 1945. In the battle for the bridge over the Rhine, he led an understrength platoon of four of the newest heavy-duty T26E3 M26 Pershing tanks. Under his leadership, his unit played an instrumental role in capturing the last intact bridge across the Rhine, the only one of 22 road and 25 railroad bridges across the Rhine that the Germans had not yet blown up.

While serving with the 14th Tank Battalion, he had previously been awarded the Silver Star for actions on December 17, 1944 during the Battle of the Bulge near Steinbruck, Belgium. When his lead tank was disabled by a German Panzerfaust round, he remained with the tank and led his platoon in destroying the enemy who had attacked his tank. He then dismounted from the tank and led his crew and the remaining tanks "under continuous enemy fire with such stunning effect of enemy demoralization that 87 prisoners were taken."

== Citation ==
On March 27, 1945, Grimball was recognized for his actions leading to the capture of the bridge with the Distinguished Service Cross.

The President of the United States of America, authorized by Act of Congress, July 9, 1918, takes pleasure in presenting the Distinguished Service Cross to First Lieutenant (Armor) John Grimball (ASN: 0-1013447), United States Army, for extraordinary heroism in connection with military operations against an armed enemy while serving with Company A, 14th Tank Battalion, 9th Armored Division, in action against enemy forces on 7 March 1945, in the vicinity of Ramagen Bridge, in Germany. Leading his tanks to the Ludendorf Bridge, First Lieutenant Grimball, in the face of heavy enemy sniper and 20-mm. anti-aircraft fire, made a hazardous reconnaissance on foot of the span. Upon ascertaining that his tanks could not cross until repairs had been made, he deployed his tanks around the bridge and directed fire covering engineers making repairs. Disregarding the intensified enemy fire, he continued his reconnaissance of the bridge structure for two hours in preparation for the crossing of his tanks. Despite constant enemy small arms, machine gun, and artillery fire, he directed the operation of a tank-bulldozer for a period of two more hours in the filling of a large crater at the approaches to the bridge. By his unflinching courage in the face of severe fire, First Lieutenant Grimball greatly expedited the repairs to the vital bridge, permitting the rapid crossing of his unit and the successful exploitation of the Remagen bridgehead. First Lieutenant Grimball's intrepid actions, personal bravery and zealous devotion to duty exemplify the highest traditions of the military forces of the United States and reflect great credit upon himself, the 9th Armored Division, and the United States Army.

== Legal career ==
Grimball took the bench in 1960, becoming a circuit court judge. He was considered for the South Carolina Supreme Court in 1980, before retiring three years later.

Grimball died on April 8, 1991 in Columbia, South Carolina, aged 77.
