= 32nd United States Colored Infantry Regiment =

Union Army infantry regiment

32nd United States Colored Infantry
- Active: February 7, 1864 - August 22, 1865
- Country: United States
- Allegiance: Union
- Branch: Infantry
- Engagements: Battle of Honey Hill

The 32nd United States Colored Infantry was an infantry regiment that served in the Union Army during the American Civil War. The regiment was composed of African American enlisted men commanded by white officers and was authorized by the Bureau of Colored Troops which was created by the United States War Department on May 22, 1863.

== Service ==
The 32nd U.S. Colored Infantry was organized at Camp William Penn near Philadelphia, Pennsylvania beginning February 7, 1864 for three-year service under the command of Colonel George W. Baird.

The regiment was attached to Bailey's Brigade, District of Hilton Head, South Carolina, Department of the South, to June 1864. Morris Island, South Carolina, Northern District, Department of the South, to October 1864. 3rd Separate Brigade, Hilton Head, South Carolina, Department of the South, to November 1864. 2nd Brigade, Coast Division, Department of the South, to December 1864. 2nd Separate Brigade, Department of the South, to June 1865. Department of the South to August 1865.

The 32nd U.S. Colored Infantry mustered out of service August 22, 1865.

== Detailed service ==
Ordered to Hilton Head, S.C., April, 1864, arriving April 27 and served duty there until June. Moved to Morris Island, S.C., and duty there operating against Charleston, S.C., until November. Expedition to Boyd's Neck November 28–30. Battle of Honey Hill November 30. Demonstration on Charleston & Savannah Railroad December 6–9. Devaux's Neck December 6. James Island February 14, 1865. Occupation of Charleston February 18. Potter's Expedition April 5–25. Dingle's Mills April 9. Statesboro April 15. Occupation of Camden April 17. Boydkin's Mills April 18. Beach Creek near Statesburg and Denken's Mills April 19. Garrison duty at Charleston, Beaufort, and Hilton Head, S.C., until August.

== Casualties ==
The regiment lost a total of 150 men during service; 2 officers and 35 enlisted men killed or mortally wounded, 113 enlisted men died of disease.

== Commanders ==
- Colonel George W. Baird

== See also ==
- List of United States Colored Troops Civil War Units
- United States Colored Troops
- Battle of Tulifinny
