= Battle of Grimball's Landing =

Battle of the American Civil War

Coordinates: 32.698°N 79.983°W

- Part of the American Civil War
Date	July 16, 1863
Location	James Island, South Carolina
Result	Inconclusive

Belligerents
United States (Union)	(Confederate States of America) CSA (Confederacy)

Commanders and leaders
Alfred Terry; George Balch	Johnson Hagood

Units involved
1st Division, X Corps (Department of the South); Stono River Flotilla	1st Military District, South Carolina

Strength
3,800	3,000

Casualties and losses
14 killed 17 wounded 14 prisoners	18

The Battle of Grimball's Landing took place in James Island, South Carolina, on July 16, 1863, during the American Civil War. It was a part of the campaign known as Operations Against the Defenses of Charleston.

== Battle ==
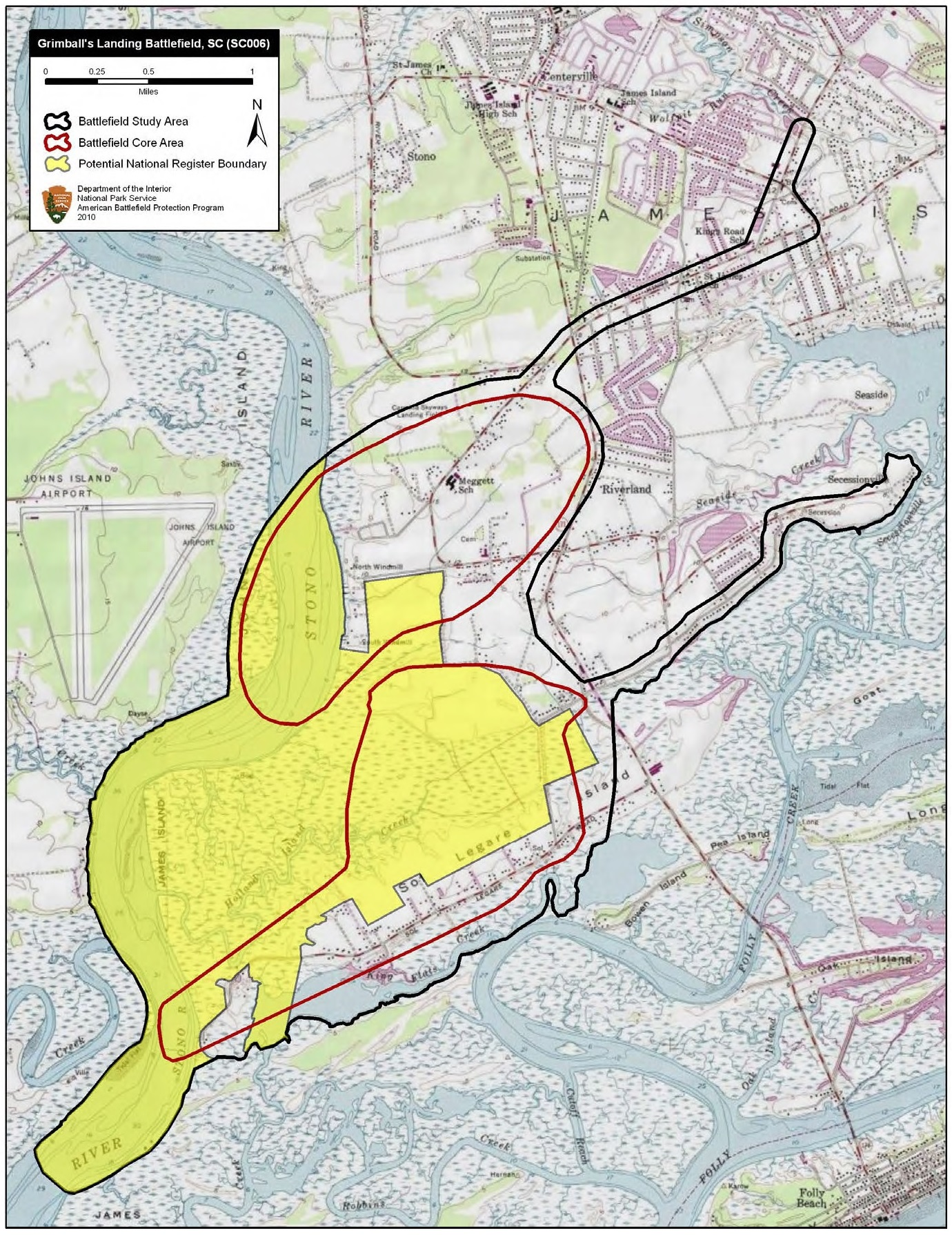
Map of Grimball's Landing Battlefield core and study areas by the American Battlefield Protection Program.

To draw Confederate forces away from reinforcing Fort Wagner, Brig. Gen. Quincy A. Gillmore designed two feints. One force was sent up Stono River to threaten the Charleston & Savannah Railroad bridge. A second force, consisting of Alfred Terry's division, landed on James Island on 8 July. Soon, Terry demonstrated his forces before the Confederate defenses but did not launch an attack.

On July 11, Gillmore made his move on Fort Wagner. The attack was made by the 7th Connecticut Infantry. Supported by a heavy naval bombardment, the assault jumped off at dawn, moving forward through a thick morning fog which helped to conceal their advance. The attackers were met with stiff resistance and were forced back with heavy losses. The regiment lost 339 men, with 123 wounded, 49 killed, and 167 missing. Against this the defenders suffered 12 casualties. Gillmore considered his next move.

Meanwhile, the Confederates moved against James Island. On July 16, they attacked, with the goal of encircling and destroying a part of the Union forces there. The men of the 10th Connecticut Infantry were in an exposed position, and in jeopardy of being cut off. The Confederate efforts to get around them were checked by the men of the 54th Massachusetts, who rebuffed a series of attacks while the 10th Connecticut was withdrawn. The 54th suffered 43 casualties, with 14 killed, 17 wounded, and 12 others lost to capture, but the 10th Connecticut was saved. The following day the Union forces were pulled off the island.

This battle was the first engagement of the 54th Massachusetts Infantry Regiment.

A letter to his wife written two days later by First Sergeant Robert John Simmons (a British citizen from Bermuda, who had previously served in the British Army) shortly before the attack on Battery Wagner was published in the New York Tribune on 23 December 1863, giving a first-hand account of the action.

Folly Island, South Carolina

July 18, 1863;

We are on the march to Fort Wagner, to storm it. We have just completed our successful retreat from James Island; we fought a desperate battle there Thursday morning. Three companies of us, B, H, and K, were out on picket about a good mile in advance of the regiment. We were attacked early in the morning. Our company was in the reserve when the outposts were attacked by rebel infantry and cavalry. I was sent out by our Captain in command of a squad of men to support the left flank. The bullets fairly rained around us; when I got there the poor fellows were falling down around me, with pitiful groans. Our pickets only numbered about 250 men, attacked by about 900. It is supposed by the line of battle in the distance, that they were supported by the reserve of 3,000 men. We had to fire and retreat toward our own encampment. One poor Sergeant of ours was shot down alongside of me; several others were wounded near me.

God has protected me through this, my first fiery, leaden trial, and I do give Him the glory, and render my praises unto His holy name. My poor friend [Sergeant Peter] Vogelsang is shot through the lungs; his case is critical, but the doctor says he may probably live. His company suffered very much. Poor good and brave Sergeant (Joseph D.) Wilson of his company [H], after killing four rebels with his bayonet, was shot through the head by the fifth one. Poor fellow! May his noble spirit rest in peace. The General has complimented the Colonel on the gallantry and bravery of his regiment.

(At roughly the same time as the events that First Sergeant Simmons described took place, his seven-year-old nephew was murdered in New York during the four days of race riots that followed the 13 July.)

== See also ==
- Battle of Secessionville (1862), a.k.a. Battle of James Island
- Battle of Grimball's Causeway (1865)
