= Leopold von Gilsa =

Union Army officer in the American Civil War

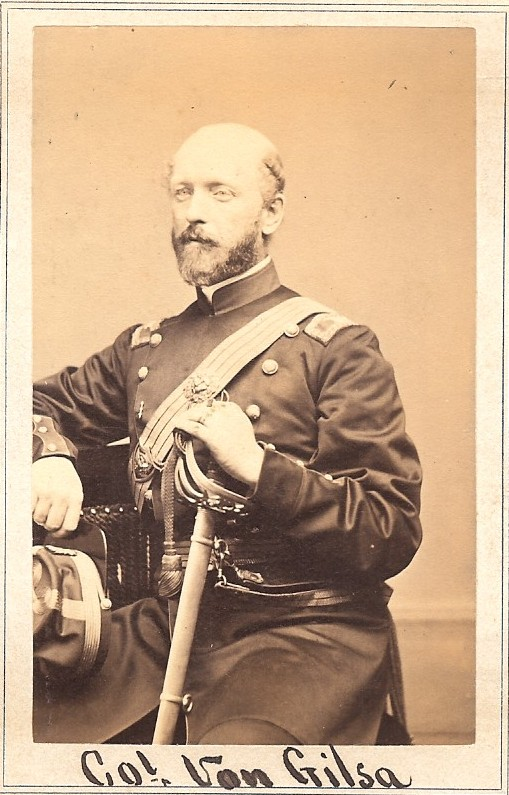
- Born: August 15, 1824; Erfurt, Germany
- Died: March 1, 1870; New York City
- Burial place: Green-Wood Cemetery Brooklyn
- Military career
- Allegiance: United States of America; Union
- Branch: Union Army
- Service years: 1861–1865
- Rank: Colonel
- Unit: Army of the Potomac
- Commands: Von Gilsa's Brigade, XI Corps
- Conflicts: American Civil War: Battle of Cross Keys; Battle of Chancellorsville; Battle of Gettysburg
- Other work: Soldier in the Prussian Army, Singer and pianist

Leopold von Gilsa (August 15, 1824 – March 1, 1870) was a career soldier who served as an officer in the armies of Prussia and later the United States. He is best known for his role in the misfortunes of the XI Corps in the Army of the Potomac during the American Civil War, particularly at the battles of Chancellorsville and Gettysburg, where many of his men were unjustly accused of cowardice.

== Early life ==
Von Gilsa was born in Germany, and served as an officer in the Prussian Army in the First Schleswig War of 1848–51. He moved to the United States and settled in New York City, where he taught and played the piano and sang in the music halls along the Bowery.

== Civil War ==
When the Civil War erupted, von Gilsa organized the De Kalb Regiment, an all-German unit, which became the 41st New York Volunteer Infantry Regiment. It was named for a hero of the American Revolution, Baron de Kalb. The regiment's development, which occurred in the Yorkville section of Manhattan, was reported in the New York Times during the spring of 1861. Some of the expenses were paid by the Union Defense Committee of New York City.

The regiment left for Washington, D.C., by water from Elizabethport, New Jersey, on July 8, 1861, followed by a trip via railroad. The regiment served under von Gilsa in the campaign leading up to the First Battle of Bull Run. It was in reserve with the rest of Theodore Runyon's Fourth Division, Army of the Potomac. The regiment then participated in the campaigns of John C. Frémont in western Virginia. Von Gilsa was severely wounded leading the regiment in the Battle of Cross Keys in June 1862.

Minus its leader, von Gilsa's regiment served in the brigade of Julius Stahel under Maj. Gen. Franz Sigel in the Second Battle of Bull Run. When Sigel's command became XI Corps, Army of the Potomac in late 1862, the De Kalbs were in First Brigade of Stahel's First Division. Von Gilsa, after recuperating, became brigade commander in this period. Following the Battle of Antietam, he assigned the De Kalb Regiment to take part in a reconnaissance led by Sigel into Virginia.

=== Chancellorsville ===
In the Battle of Chancellorsville, Von Gilsa's brigade was on the right flank of the army on May 2, 1863, when Stonewall Jackson made his march to outflank the Union Army. Von Gilsa warned the division commander, Charles Devens, that Confederate troops had been detected in the woods near his line. Devens and Oliver Otis Howard, the corps commander, ignored his warnings. The Confederate attack that followed swept von Gilsa's brigade away and routed his terror-stricken soldiers. Von Gilsa and other Germans were blamed by Howard and others for the misfortunes of the XI Corps, a display of xenophobia that was protested by German Americans at the time. Von Gilsa was noted for the use of profanity in his native German. During the retreat from Chancellorsville, Von Gilsa and Howard crossed paths and Von Gilsa poured out a stream of oaths in German with such vehemence and in such profusion that Howard thought he had gone insane.

=== Gettysburg ===
In June 1863, Von Gilsa initially had bad relations with the new division commander, Francis C. Barlow, who put him under arrest for allowing more than one man at a time to leave the column to get water. (The Germans thought Barlow a petty tyrant.) Von Gilsa was back in command of his brigade at the Battle of Gettysburg. On the first day, Barlow advanced his division to a knoll in advance of his assigned position, today known as Barlow Knoll. Von Gilsa's command was on the right flank of the line, and it was ousted from its position by the Confederate division of Jubal Early, which outflanked Barlow's line.

On the second day, the remainder of von Gilsa's brigade was positioned in a lane at the foot of Cemetery Hill. The line, as established by acting division commander Adelbert Ames was too thin, and an attack by Early's division broke through. Troops of the XI Corps, assisted by the brigade of Samuel Carroll from II Corps, expelled the Confederate attackers. Carroll's brigade joined the XI Corps soldiers in holding the line against any potential Confederate attack on the third day of the battle.

=== Later campaigns ===
After Gettysburg, Alexander Schimmelfennig took command of the brigade. Von Gilsa returned to command of his regiment. The division passed to George Henry Gordon, and was transferred to the Department of the South. Von Gilsa commanded the First Brigade, Gordon's Division, X Corps on Folly Island, one of the Sea Islands of South Carolina from August 1863 to June 1864. He also commanded the garrison of Folly Island, including conducting reconnaissances and small raids in that vicinity.

The veterans of the De Kalb Regiment returned to New York City in June 1864, with von Gilsa still in command. It had left with nearly 1,500 men and returned with 327. (Recent recruits were retained in service until December 9, 1865.) Von Gilsa remained on the ranks of active officers without a formal command until he mustered out in December 1865.

== Death ==
Colonel von Gilsa died in New York City. He was buried on March 3, 1870, at Green-Wood Cemetery in Brooklyn. Franz Sigel delivered a few brief remarks as a eulogy. Barlow and Carl Schurz praised von Gilsa's courage, and his soldiers liked him.
