= George W. Baird =

United States Army general

George William Baird
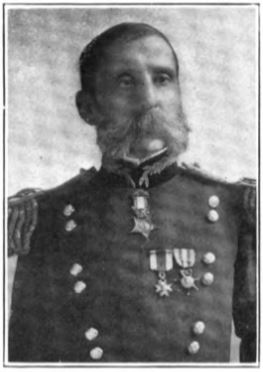
- Born: December 13, 1839; Milford, Connecticut, US
- Died: November 26, 1906 (aged 66); Asheville, North Carolina, US
- Military career
- Allegiance: United States; Union
- Branch: United States Army; Union Army
- Service years: 1862–1903
- Rank: Brigadier General
- Commands: 32nd United States Colored Infantry
- Conflicts: American Civil War; Indian Wars
- Awards: Medal of Honor

George William Baird (December 13, 1839 – November 26, 1906) was a US Army officer. He served in the Union Army during the American Civil War. He received the Medal of Honor for his actions during the Indian Wars.

== Early life ==
Baird was born on December 13, 1839, in Milford, Connecticut. He graduated from Hopkins Grammar School in 1859, and later entered Yale University. Despite leaving Yale prior to graduation to fight in the American Civil War, he received his diploma in 1863.

== Military career ==
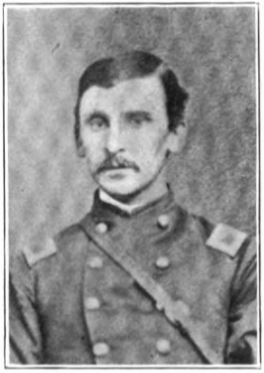
George W. Baird, as a young man

Baird joined the 1st Connecticut Light Artillery Battery in August 1862, and served with the unit until March 1864, when he was appointed colonel of volunteers of the 32nd United States Colored Infantry. He mustered out with his regiment in August 1865, and was appointed as a second lieutenant of the 19th Infantry Regiment in May 1866. From 1871 to 1879, he served as adjutant of the 5th Infantry Regiment, commanded by Nelson A. Miles (Baird later wrote the book General Miles's Indian Campaigns: On the Staked Plains.), and served under him in the Nez Perce War. He became deputy paymaster general with the rank of lieutenant colonel in July 1899. Baird was eventually promoted to brigadier general on February 19, 1903, the day before his retirement.

He was a companion of the Military Order of the Loyal Legion of the United States and a member of the Order of the Indian Wars of the United States.

== Death ==
Baird died on November 26, 1906, in Asheville, North Carolina.

== Medal of Honor citation ==
Rank and organization: First Lieutenant, 5th U.S. Infantry. Place and date: At Bear Paw Mountains, Mont., September 30, 1877. Entered service at: Milford, Conn. Birth: Milford, Conn. Date of issue: November 27, 1894.

Citation

Most distinguished gallantry in action with the Nez Perce Indians.
