= Daily American =

The Daily American is the name of several newspapers:

- Daily American (Pennsylvania) (founded 1929)
- Daily American (Illinois) (1920–2015)
- Nashville Daily American (c. 1876–1910), Tennessee
- Rome Daily American (1946–1984), Rome, Italy
- Daily American Times (1853–1854), Baltimore, Maryland
- Daily American, former newspaper in Jacksonville, Florida established by James Weldon Johnson
