= Delmar =

Delmar may refer to:

== Places in the United States ==
- Delmar, Alabama
- Delmar, Delaware
- Delmar, Iowa
- Delmar, Maryland
- Delmar, Missouri
- Delmar, New York
- Delmar Township, Pennsylvania
- Delmar, West Virginia
- Delmar, Wisconsin
- Delmar Loop, a neighborhood in St. Louis, Missouri
  - Delmar Boulevard, namesake of the neighborhood

== People ==
- Delmar (surname)
- Delmar Burridge, American politician
- Del Crandall (1930–2021), American Major League Baseball player and manager
- Delmar DeLong (1931–1999), American lawyer and farmer
- Delmar R. Lowell (1844–1912), American minister, Civil War veteran, historian, and genealogist
- M. Delmar Ritchie (1875–1916), American football coach
- Delmar Valleau (1917–2000), Canadian farmer and politician
- Delmar Watson (1926–2008), American child actor and news photographer
- George Koval (1913–2006), American spy for Soviet Union known as "Delmar"

== Other uses ==
- Delmar station (disambiguation)
- Delmar Independent School District
- Delmar (album), the debut album of Argentine rock band Los Natas
- Delmar, a shipwreck off the coast of Newfoundland
- Delmar Calaboose, listed on the National Register of Historic Places in Clinton County, Iowa
- Delmar, a publisher and a division of Cengage Learning

== See also ==
- Delmer (disambiguation)
- Del Mar (disambiguation)
- Delmarva Peninsula
