= 55th Pennsylvania Infantry Regiment =

Union Army infantry regiment

- Also known as the 55th Pennsylvania, 55th Pennsylvania Volunteers or the 55th Pennsylvania Veteran Volunteers (Not to be confused with the 55th Pennsylvania Militia, Emergency of 1863)
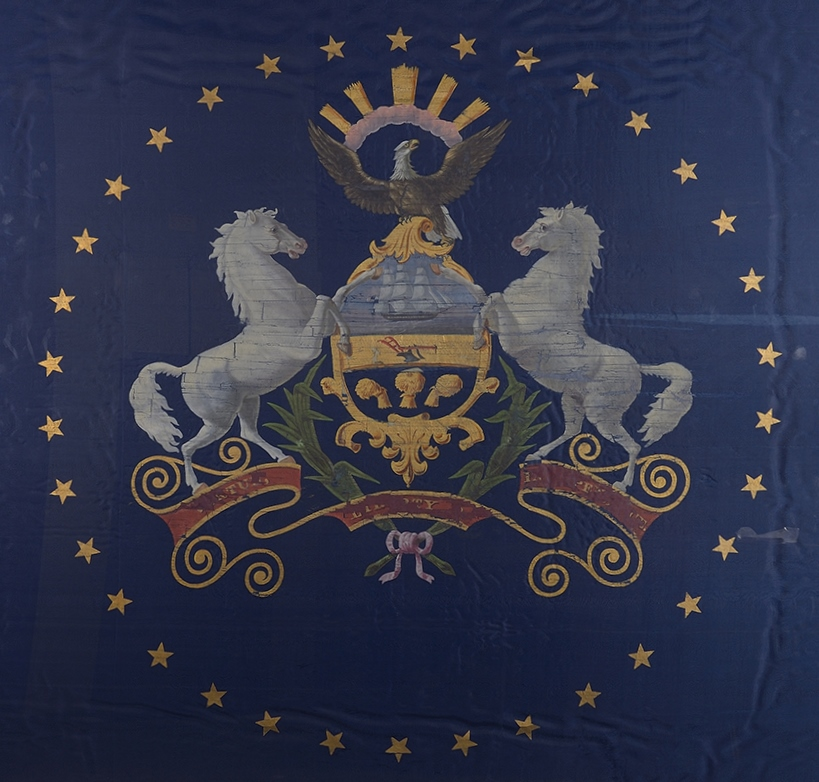
- Active: November 1861 – August 30, 1865
- Country: United States
- Allegiance: Union
- Branch: Union Army
- Type: Infantry
- Size: 28 officers and 757 enlisted men (Initial muster in strength); 400 (At the Second Battle of Pocotaligo); 1,250 (After 30-day furlough); 373 officers and men (By November, 1864)
- Equipment: Springfield Model 1861 Muskets
- Engagements: Engagement at Little Ediston (March 29, 1862); Battle of Simmon's Bluff (June 21, 1862); Second Battle of Pocotaligo (October 22, 1862); Battle of Swift Creek (May 9, 1864); Battle of Proctor's Creek (May 12, 1864 – May 16, 1864); Battle of Cold Harbor (July 30, 1864); Second Battle of Petersburg (June 15, 1864 – June 18, 1864); Battle of Chaffin's Farm (September 29–30, 1864); Battle of Hatcher's Run (February 5–7, 1865); Third Battle of Petersburg (April 2, 1865); Battle of Rice's Station (April 6, 1865); Battle of Appomattox Court House (April 9, 1865)

Commanders
- Notable commanders: Colonel Richard White; Lieutenant Colonel Frank T. Bennett; Major John H. Filler

The 55th Pennsylvania Infantry Regiment, officially known as the 55th Regiment, Pennsylvania Volunteer Infantry was an infantry regiment that served in the Union Army during the American Civil War. It was organized at Harrisburg, Pennsylvania, in 1861. The regiment was recruited primarily from farmers, miners, and artisans, mainly from seven Pennsylvania counties, into ten companies. It was mustered into service in November 1861.

The 55th Pennsylvania took part in battles primarily in South Carolina, notably at Pocotaligo, where it suffered several casualties. It later participated in the Bermuda Hundred Campaign, after a 30-day furlough, suffering heavy casualties, especially at the 1864 Battle of Proctor's Creek (also known as Drewry's Bluff). It also fought in the Siege of Petersburg and the Appomattox Campaign, joining in the subsequent pursuit of Lee and his army until their surrender at Appomattox Court House, the regiment continued their service, stationed in Virginia until they were mustered out on August 30, 1865 at Petersburg, Virginia, before receiving their final pay and being disbanded at Harrisburg.

The regiment was also known as the 55th Pennsylvania Veteran Volunteers (Note: According to a newspaper by Lykens Register, the regiment was referred as the "Fifty-Fifth regiment, Pennsylvania Veteran Volunteers") due to the majority of the men re-enlisting for another 3 years as veterans.

== Organization ==
The regiment was organized at Camp Curtin, Harrisburg, 1861, with the recruitment being led by Col. Richard White, who had been given authority of raising the regiment by Pennsylvania Governor Andrew G. Curtin. The companies of this regiment were recruited from the counties of Cambria, Berks, Blair, Bedford, Schuylkill, Dauphin, and Indiana, many of them being farmers, miners, or artisans.

The companies of this regiment were recruited at:

- Company A: Cambria County – Captain James Carroll
- Company B: Robesonia, Berks County – Captain John C. Shearer
- Company C: Johnstown, Cambria County – Captain Michael O’Connell
- Company D: Bedford County – Captain Thomas H. Lyons
- Company E: Minersville, Schuylkill County – Captain Horace C. Bennett
- Company F: Indiana County – Captain James S. Nesbit
- Company G: Harrisburg, Dauphin County – Captain Isaac S. Waterbury
- Company H: Bedford County – Captain George S. Mullin
- Company I: Blair County and Bedford County – Captain David W. Madara
- Company K: Bedford County – Captain Joseph Filler

After they were extensively trained in November 1861, the regiment was mustered into service. On November 18, 1861, the regiment received its regimental colors by Governor Andrew G. Curtin in a ceremony held at the Hills Capitol. Before the regiment left the state, companies B, E and G were stationed at Camp Cameron near Harrisburg, where they received instructions by Federal army officers.

== Service ==
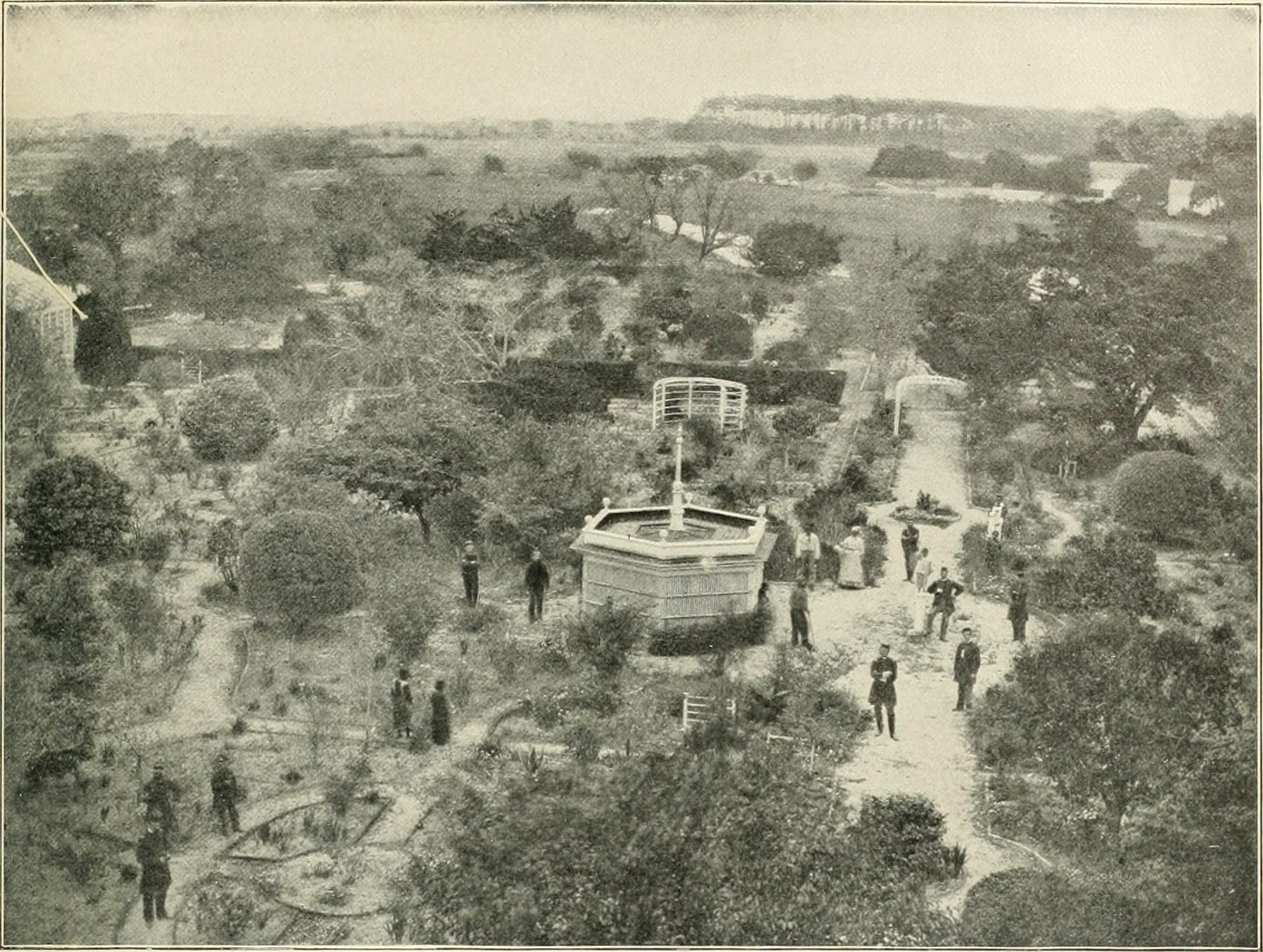
A photograph of Union troops occupying John Seabrook's plantation on Edisto Island

=== Early service ===
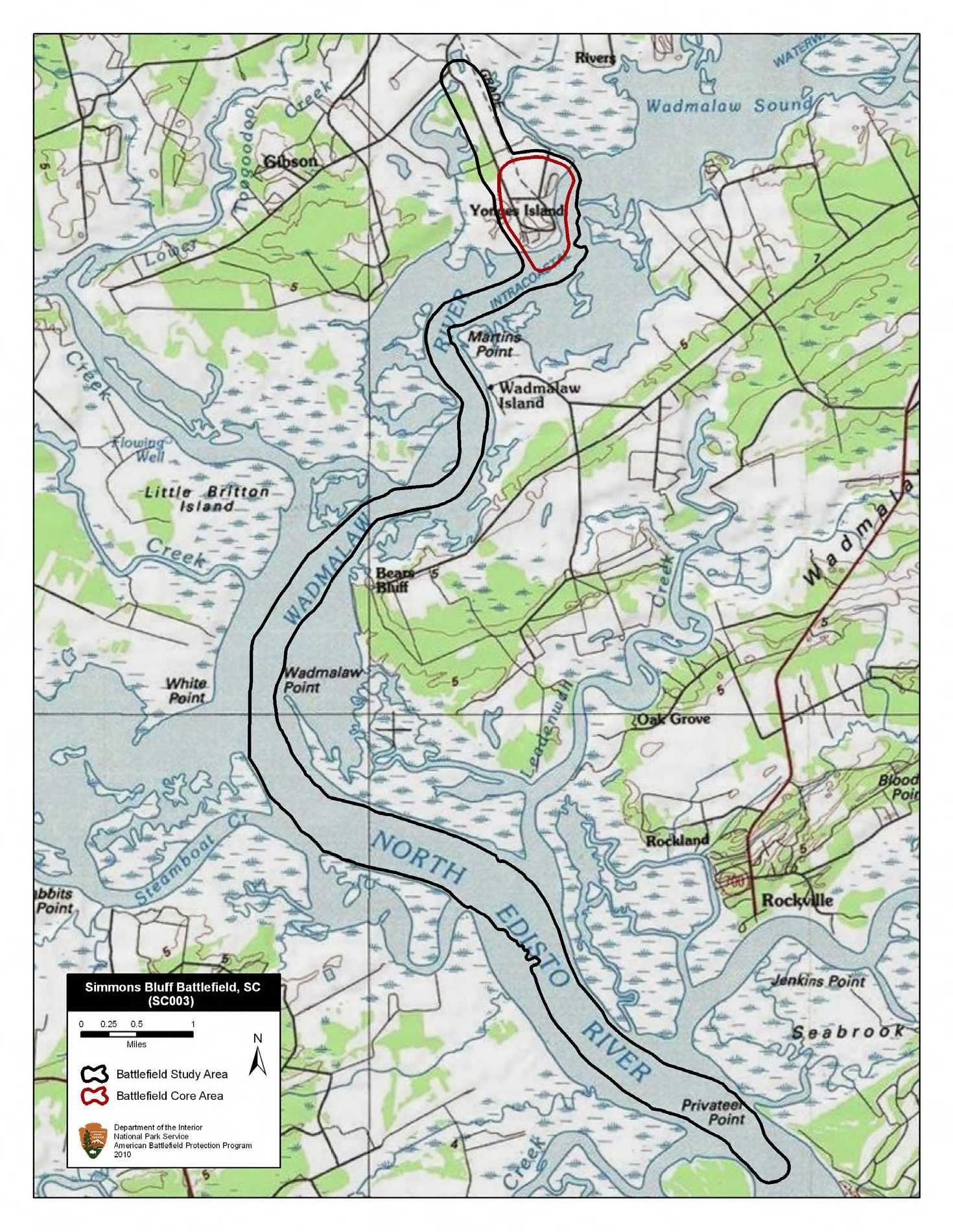
Map of Simon's Bluff Battlefield core and study areas by the American Battlefield Protection Program

After it was mustered into service, 38 officers and 757 enlisted men of the 55th left the state and moved to Fort Monroe, Virginia , on November 22 for drill. On December 8, the 55th, alongside the 45th, 76th , and 97th, embarked for South Carolina, arriving at Port Royal on December 12. The 55th was immediately sent to guard the small islands and approaches, west of Hilton Head, and remained there until February 25, 1862, when it was transferred to Edisto Island, arriving there on March 6, subsequently establishing their headquarters at the William Seabrook House, on the northern part of the island.

==== Engagement at Little Edisto ====
While they were stationed on Edisto Island, a series of Confederate attacks were made against the Union forces stationed there, one of the most serious attacks took place on March 29, when companies E, F and G, who were stationed on Little Edisto, were attacked by 2,000 Confederate forces led by General Nathan G. Evans, and were pushed off from Little Edisto Island, with the men of Companies E, F and G, having to swim for nearly one mile in the overflowed swamp before reaching the regiment, losing 21 men as prisoners and 2 men as killed, alongside several wounded.

Historical accounts of this battle differ, with Union regimental histories (Note: Such as Bate's History of the Pennsylvania Volunteers 1861-1865) claiming that this regiment repulsed the Confederates, losing 20 men killed or wounded. While other accounts claim that the Confederates pushed the Federal forces off Little Edisto Island, capturing 21 prisoners and 2 men killed, alongside several wounded. Following this engagement, Evans reported back to the Confederate government, exaggerating the size of the Union defense by claiming that he had faced over 6,000 Union forces there.

=== Battle of Simmon's Bluff ===
In June, Union forces operating against Charleston launched an amphibious expedition to destroy the Charleston & Savannah Railroad, in which Company E of the 55th Pennsylvania was a part of. On June 21, the 55th, who was on the gunboat Crusader and the transport Planter, landed on Wadmalow Sound. There, the 55th would discover the Confederate encampment of Companies A and H, 16th South Carolina Infantry, alongside a section of Marion Artillery. The 55th surprised and burned the Confederate encampment, with the Confederates scattered, the 55th Pennsylvania returned to their ships. Despite the victory, Federal forces abandoned the raid on the railroad. During this engagement, the regiment did not take any casualties.

After the engagements, the regiment continued to be stationed on Edisto Island, being the only Union forces there until October 21, while they were stationed there, Color Sergeant James Miller, who had served as the regiment's color bearer, died of disease.

=== Second Battle of Pocotaligo ===
On October 21, the regiment took part in General Brannan's expedition up Broad River to Pocotaligo, with the regiment attached to the 1st Brigade under the command of Brig. Gen Alfred Terry, this force of over 4,500 men, with each infantryman being issued over 100 rounds of ammunition, which severely limited the expedition's effectiveness. landed at Mackey's Point under the cover of gunboats. The expedition's debarkation was heavily reliant on the Army Signal Corps; 1st Lieutenant George H. Hill of the 55th Pennsylvania, serving as an acting signal officer, continuously directed communications between General Brannan's forces and the naval gunboats. Once ashore, Brannan's forces immediately advanced on the Pocotaligo Bridge, intending to destroy the Charleston & Savannah Railroad.

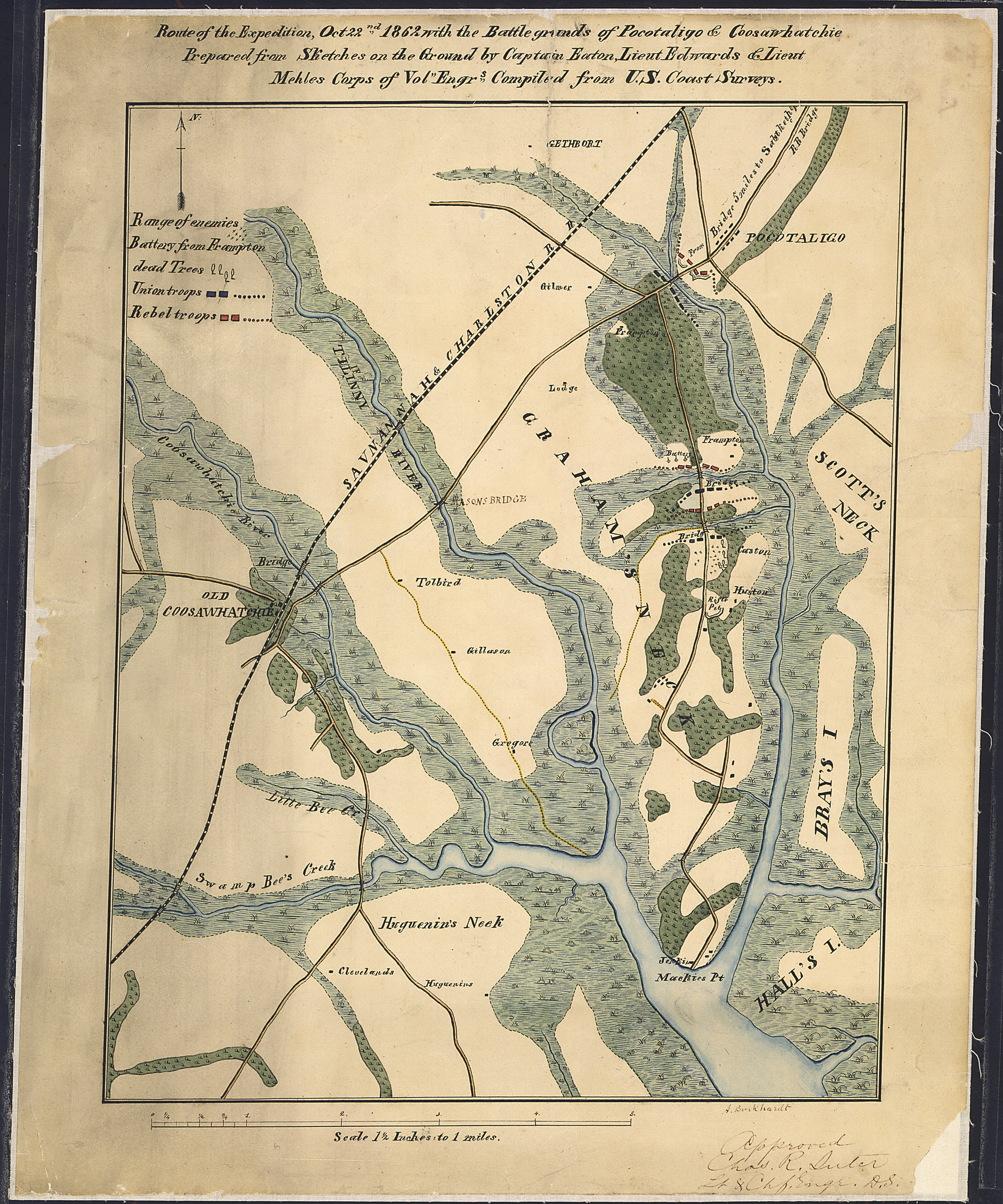
Map of the battle and route of the expedition

At approximately 8:00 in the morning, on October 22, the regiment, consisting of 400 men, took part in a series of engagements at Caston's and Frampton's Plantations. The regiment, alongside the 6th New Hampshire, drove Confederate forces as far as the Pocotaligo River. The Confederates burned the Pocotaligo Bridge, subsequently taking up defensive positions behind the Pocotaligo River, and calling in reinforcements from Savannah and Charleston.

In the subsequent engagement, the regiment was fiercely engaged on the Union left. Colonel Richard White deployed Companies A and B as sharpshooters, who managed to effectively suppress the Confederate batteries until their ammunition ran low; they were relieved by Company K, armed with Springfield muskets. At the same time, Companies D and E were also sent forward, but due to them being armed with altered smooth-bore muskets, they were rendered unable to compete with the Confederate marksmen. Along the front, the ammunition for the Union artillery completely failed, due to the reserve ammunition caissons were left behind at Macknay's point due to a lack of wagons, Union forces were unable to push back the Confederates from their positions.

==== Fighting at Cooswhatchie ====
While the engagement at Pocotaligo took place, a detachment of the 48th New York, alongside engineers and mechanics, landed near the village of Cooswhatchie via the transport Planter, with the objective of destroying the western segment of the Charleston & Savannah Railroad. While marching upon the village, a Confederate train carrying large numbers of Confederate forces crowded into the exposed flatcars, before immediately facing a volley from the detachment and a naval howitzer. The ambush killed the train's engineer and inflicted heavy casualties on the Confederates.

The train halted in the village and the surviving Confederates disembarked and went on to reinforce the Confederates guarding the bridge. Faced with Confederate reinforcements, the engineers who had started tearing up the railroad, were forced to abandon their works and fell back. The Confederates pursued the Union detachment before facing heavy fire from the transport Planter, which they mistaken to have been an unarmed transport ship, the Confederates were subsequently driven back. After Col. Barton identified the location of the village, including the train depot, Barton directed his 30-pounder Parrott Rifles to bombard both targets for two hours that afternoon. The detachment safely returned to Mackay's Point before nightfall.

With ammunition running low and being unable to gain an advantage, Union forces were forced to retreat under the cover of night and would move to Hilton Head. During this engagement, the regiment lost 29 men killed and wounded, with Captain Horace C. Bennett killed while leading his men in a charge against a Confederate battery.

After this engagement, the regiment spent the rest of 1863, stationed at Beaufort, South Carolina, while conducting picket duty and garrison duty on the fortifications at Port Royal.

=== Re-enlistment and arrival in Virginia ===
On January 1, 1864, the majority of the men re-enlisted for another 3 years as veterans and were sent on a 30-day furlough to Harrisburg on January 22 until March 23, when the regiment, now 1,250 strong, returned to South Carolina, conducting drill and guard duties for three weeks there. In April, the regiment embarked for Virginia, landing in Gloucester Point. It was subsequently attached to the 3rd Brigade, 3rd Division of X Corps, of the Army of the James (Commanded by Maj. Gen. Benjamin Butler), which was preparing to operate against Richmond. X Corps moved to Bermuda Hundred, and there the 55th advanced inland with little resistance and was initially engaged in fortifying the head of the peninsula, between the James River and Appomattox River, helping secure the Union base of operations there.

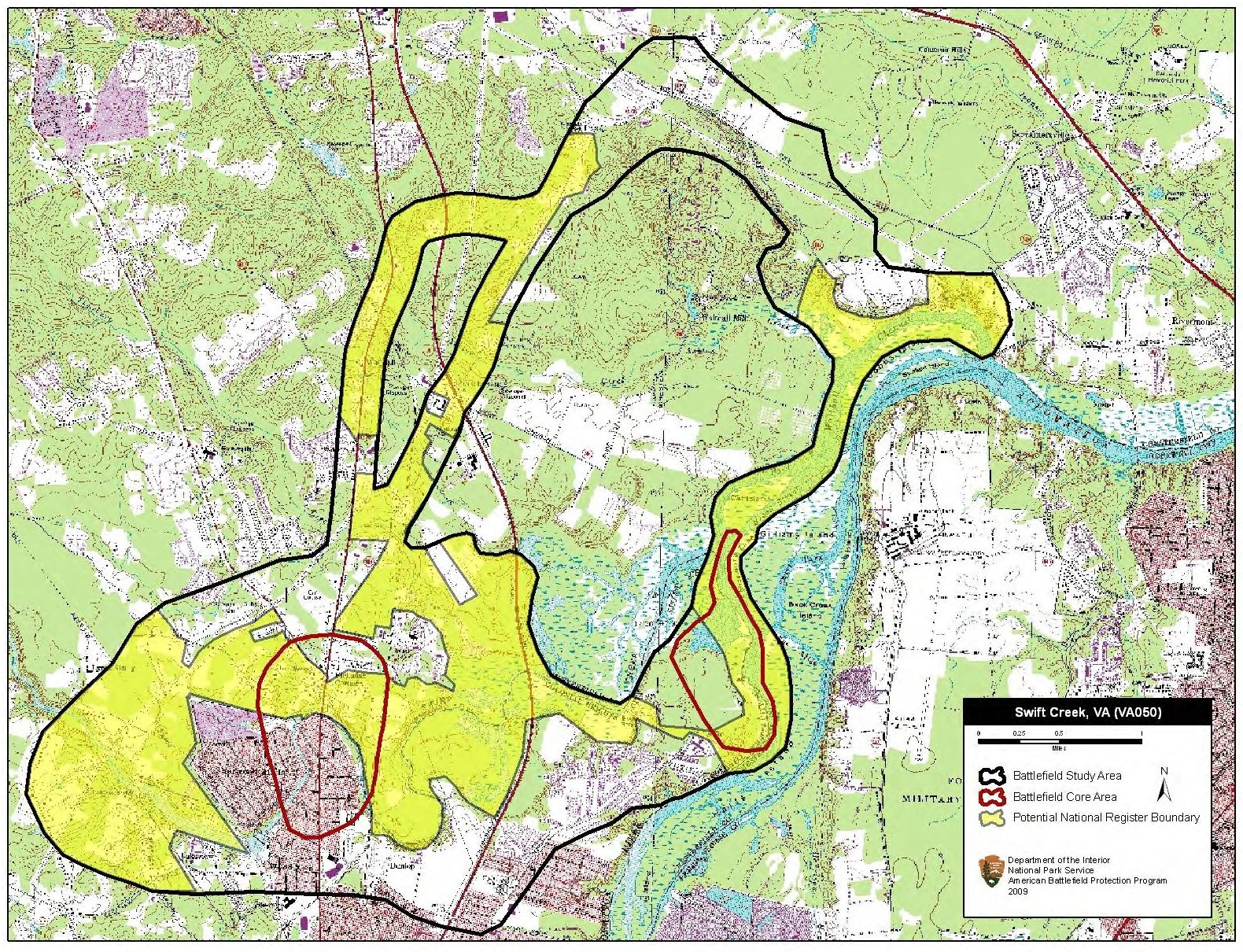
Map of the Swift Creek Battlefield core and study areas by the American Battlefield Protection Program

=== Bermuda Hundred Campaign ===
On May 9, the regiment moved out with the 3rd Division, intending to destroy two miles of the Richmond and Petersburg Railroad. Later that day, they encountered Confederate forces at Swift Creek, engaging with them until evening. The following morning, on May 10, the division was forced to support troops attacking Union forces in their rear, and the division successfully drove the Confederates as far as Drewry's Bluff.

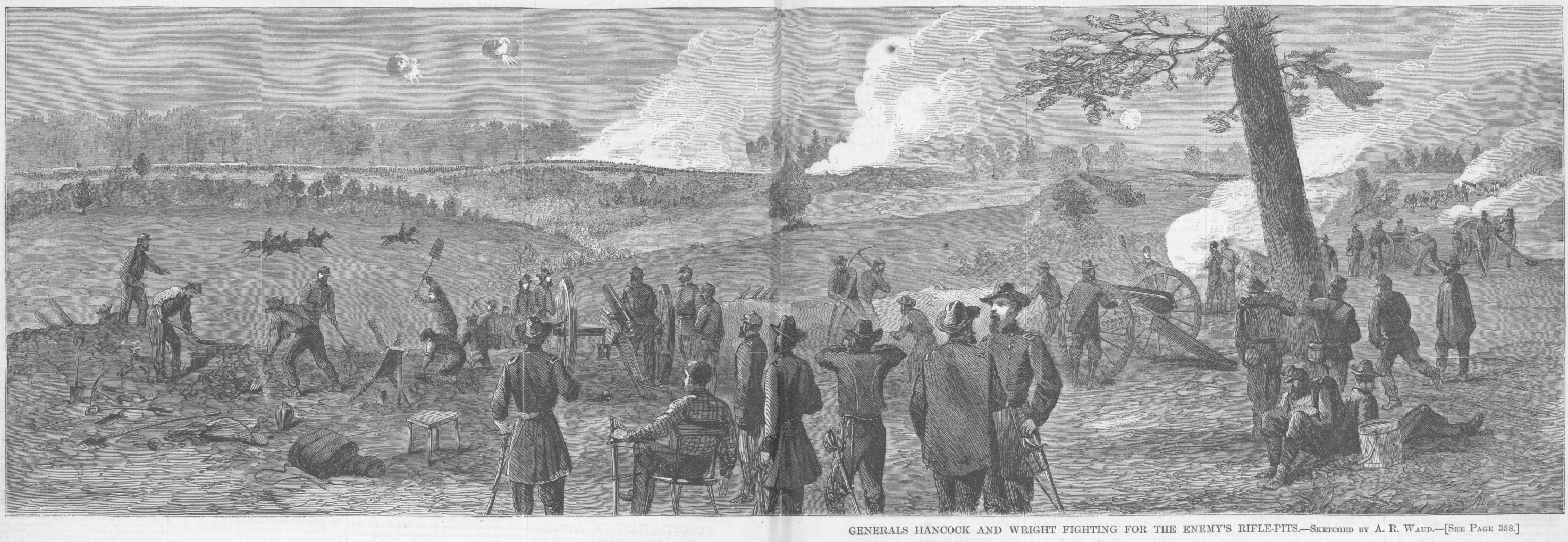
General Hancock and Wright fight for the Confederate rifle pits during the Battle of Proctor's Creek (1864)

The Union advance towards Richmond resumed on May 13, encountering heavy fortifications at Proctor's Creek. Union forces were able to carry the outer line and spent the next two days trying to flank the Confederate position. However, Confederate forces under P. G. T. Beauregard. Recognizing that the Union line was dangerously extended, on May 16, under the cover of a dense fog, Beauregard launched a massive surprise attack on the Union forces there. The 55th Pennsylvania was positioned near the extreme left of the Union line, and bore the brunt of the Confederate assault, fighting closely alongside the 4th New Hampshire. The regiment repulsed several charges and stubbornly held its position. Eventually, however, the 55th was outflanked and was on the brink of being surrounded and captured. As a last resort, Colonel White sent Companies C, D, and E in a desperate counterattack against the Confederate advance, but was repulsed.

During this battle, the regiment lost 300 men killed, wounded, or captured, with Colonel White, Lieutenant John C. Bennett, and Adjutant J.C Metzger being captured, and Captain John C. Shearer took command of the regiment after the battle.

After the battle, Butler's army retreated to Bermuda Hundred, and the 55th subsequently took part in several minor skirmishes there. On the morning of May 20, Confederate forces attacked the picket line at Foster's Plantation, and there, elements of the 55th were positioned. They made stiff resistance, holding their ground until Union forces on their left and right flank retreated, leaving the position of the regiment dangerously exposed, and the regiment subsequently fell back to avoid capture.

=== Battle of Cold Harbor ===
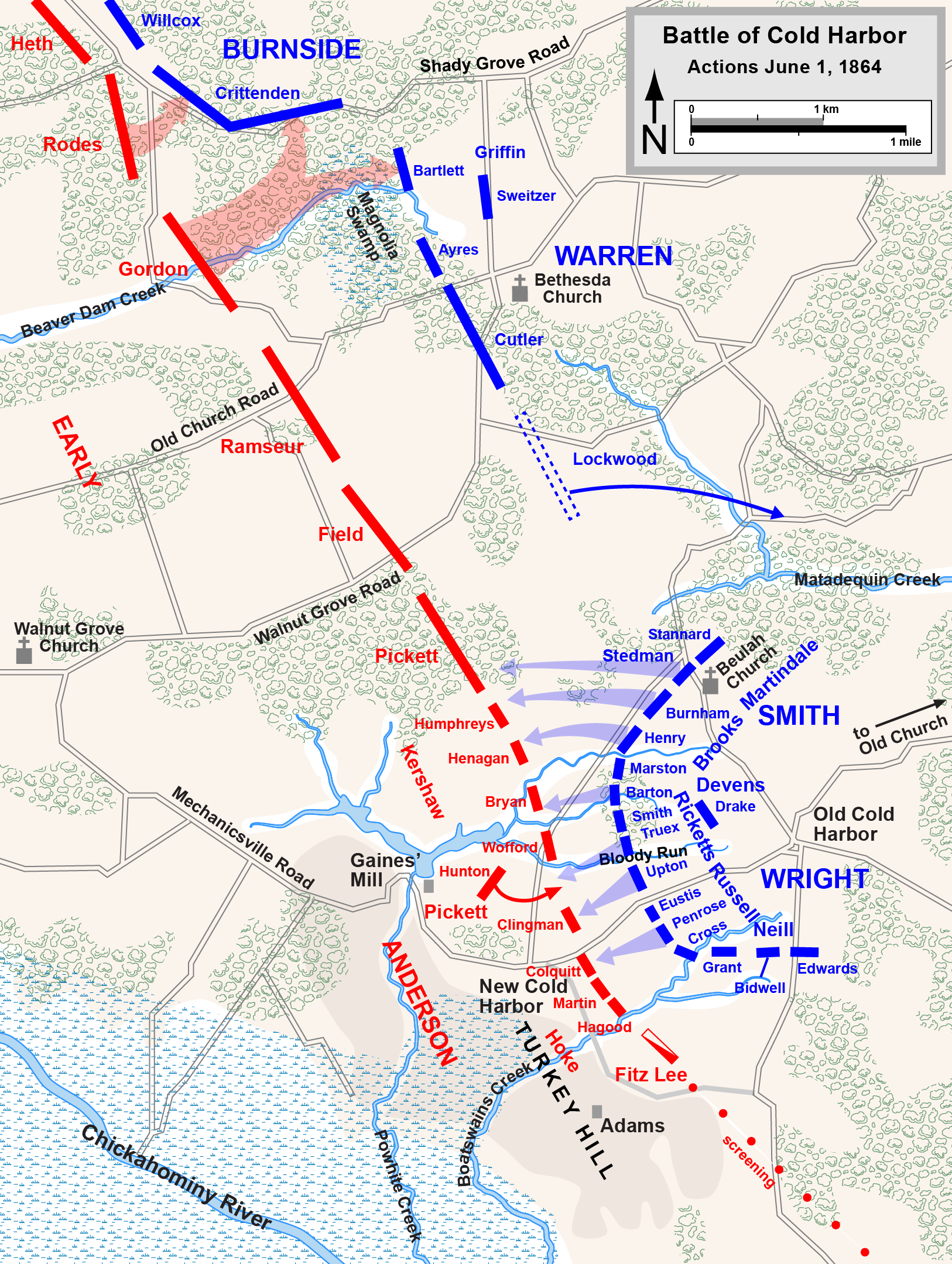
Map of the Battle of Cold Harbor on June 1.

Following the Bermuda Hundred Campaign, the 55th Pennsylvania was selected to join in a detachment commanded by Maj. Gen. William F. "Baldy" Smith to support the Army of the Potomac, and for this assignment, it was attached to the 1st Brigade (Commanded by Brig. Gen. George J. Stannard), 2nd Division (Commanded by Brig. Gen. John H. Martindale) of XVIII Corps. The regiment was transported through the James and York Rivers and marched from West Point to Cold Harbor, arriving on June 1. Later that day, the regiment participated in an assault that captured a Confederate rifle pit line and prisoners.

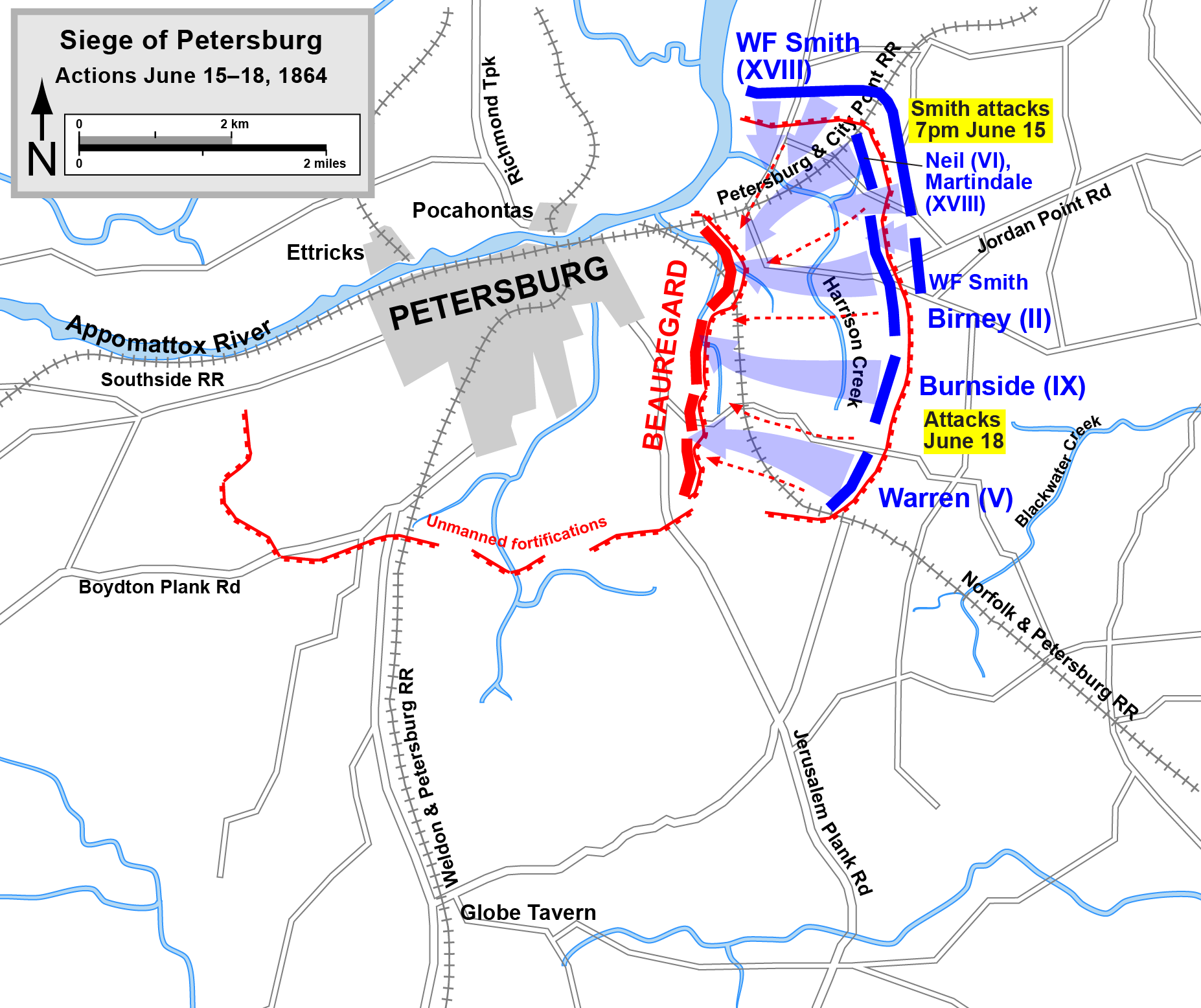
Assaults during the Second Battle of Petersburg (June 15-18, 1864)

During the Battle of Cold Harbor, the 55th Pennsylvania, was the third regiment in the attacking column, but was repulsed by intense Confederate fire, which forced the leading regiments of the column to fall back, disrupting the 55th's advance. During the confusion, the regiment took heavy casualties among its commanders. Captain John C. Shearer, who had just taken command of the regiment after the Battle of Proctor's Creek, was wounded and was replaced by Captain James S. Nesbitt, who was subsequently wounded after taking charge, Captain George H. Hill of Company E would assume command and successfully reorganized the regiment.

During the night, the 55th entrenched themselves on the breastworks, which were thrown up, until June 12, when the Army of the Potomac withdrew from the battlefield and marched back to White House. During this engagement, the regiment lost 4 officers and 134 men as casualties.

=== Petersburg Campaign ===
From White House, the regiment moved to Point of Rocks on the Appomattox River via transport, debarking there, and would participate in Grant's first assault on Petersburg on the morning of June 15, 1864, capturing 18 Confederate guns and 400 prisoners. On the second day, they were deployed as skirmishers, advancing on the Confederate fortifications, and captured a position close to the Confederate positions, but suffered heavy casualties in this assault.

On June 18, Stannard's Brigade, positioned on the extreme right of the Union line, was ordered to charge in front of an open field, which was covered by Confederate infantry and artillery. The 55th pushed forward, but at a high cost. During this charge, the regiment lost 3 officers and 80 men killed in less than 10 minutes. On the evening of June 29, XVIII Corps took position on the rear of IX Corps. The regiment was held in reserve during the Battle of the Crater on July 30 and wasn't engaged. It was subsequently ordered back to the Appomattox River, with the regiment having to constantly face Confederate artillery and musket fire, although barely suffering any losses.

==== Battle of Chaffin's Farm ====
During the battle of Chaffin's Farm on the late afternoon of September 29, 1864, Colonel James Jourdan, now commanding the 1st brigade, ordered the 55th to charge a Confederate redoubt in the second line of defense, this advance was meant to support the 158th New York moving through the woods on the left, and the 148th New York which were acting as skirmishers on the right, the 55th advanced a quarter of a mile of open ground under concentrated Confederate fire from three redoubts, alongside entrenched Confederate infantry.

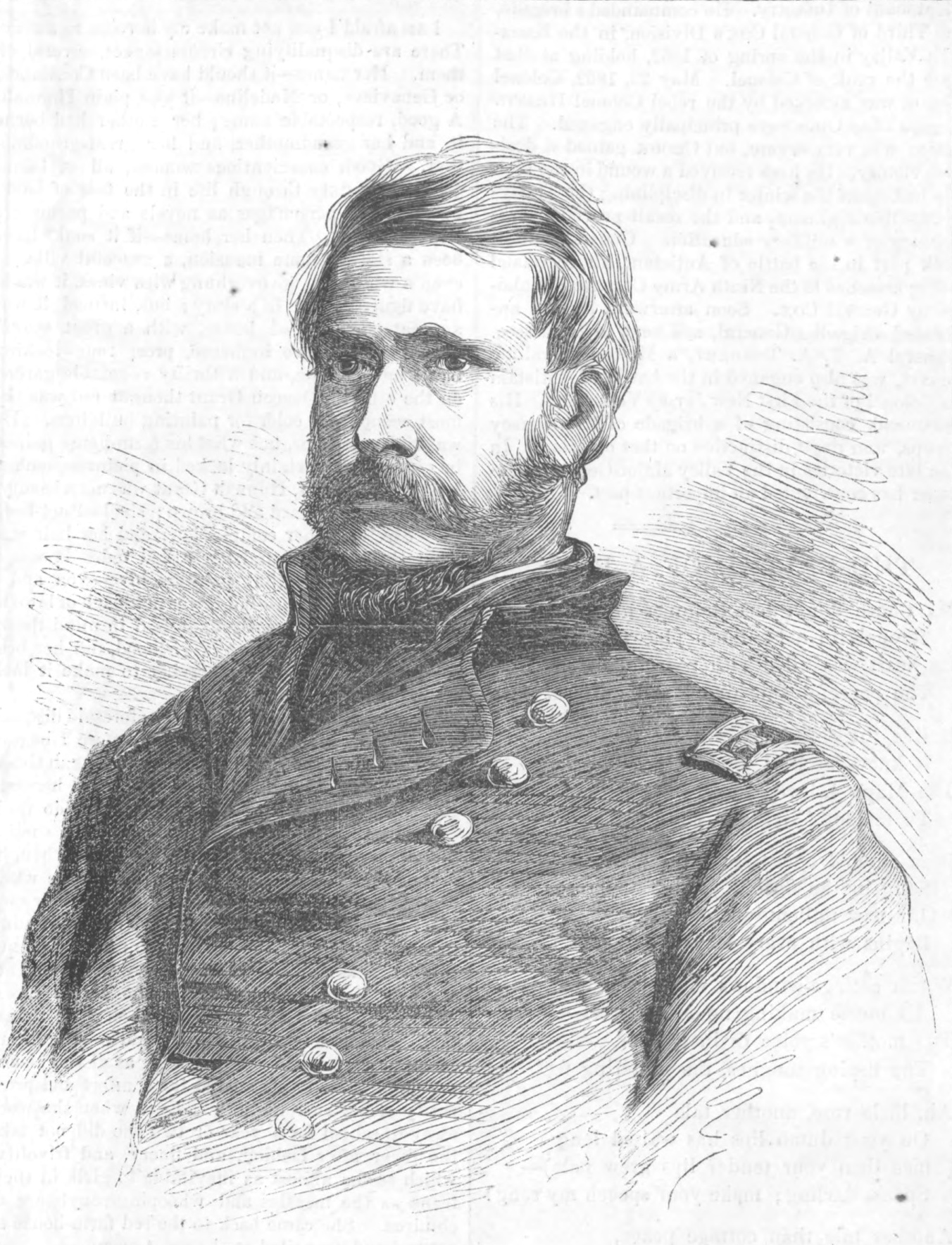
A sketch of Maj. Gen. Edward Ord

The supporting regiments failed to reach the 55th, and left the 55th Pennsylvania completely exposed. The regiment only managed to reach within twenty yards of a redoubt before they were forced to retreat, leaving their dead and dying in Confederate hands. The regiment lost 3 officers and 78 men casualties out of their 5 officers and 150 engaged, wounded or missing. Among the officers was Lieutenant Blaney Adair, who was killed, and Captain John O'Neil, who was mortally wounded. The following day, on September 30, Confederate forces launched 3 attacks on the now Union-held Fort Harrison, but were all repulsed. By November, the regiment's colors had been severely tattered, and the regiment requested a new set of colors; the remnants of the colors were deposited at the Pennsylvania State Capitol. On November 22, 1864, the regiment reported that it had over 373 officers and men, and was commanded by Captain George H. Hill.

On December 3, 1864, white soldiers of X Corps and XVIII were consolidated to form the XXIV Corps, and the regiment was subsequently attached to the 4th Brigade, 1st Division, and was sent to perform guard and picket duties on the northern bank of the James River. On December 10, the regiment was stationed at a redoubt on Signal Hill, just near the extreme right of the Union line, when Longstreet's Corps attacked the Hill, but was repulsed.

=== Appomattox Campaign ===
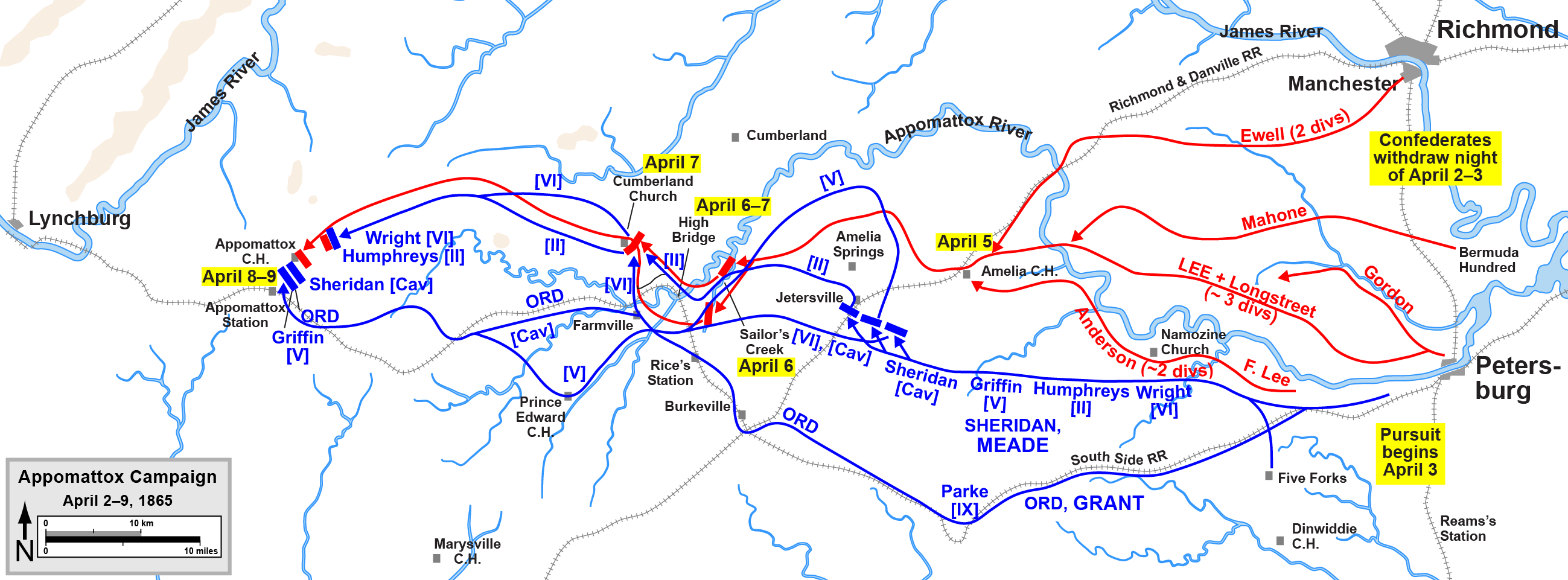
Overview map of the Appomattox Campaign

On March 27, 1865, the 1st and 2nd divisions of XVIII Corps, broke their camps and crossed the James and Appomattox Rivers, to Hatcher's Run, and relieved II Corps on the Morning of March 29, which moved further to the left, from March 30-31, elements of the 55th Pennsylvania were on picket line near Hatcher's Run when they skirmished with Confederate forces, losing two men, one officer, and 17 men wounded in the process. On April 2, the 4th Brigade, now under the command of Col. Fairchild, attacked Fort Gregg and Fort Baldwin in the morning. The 55th was the first regiment to move into and occupy Fort Baldwin, where they lost 1 officer killed, alongside 1 officer and 4 men wounded.

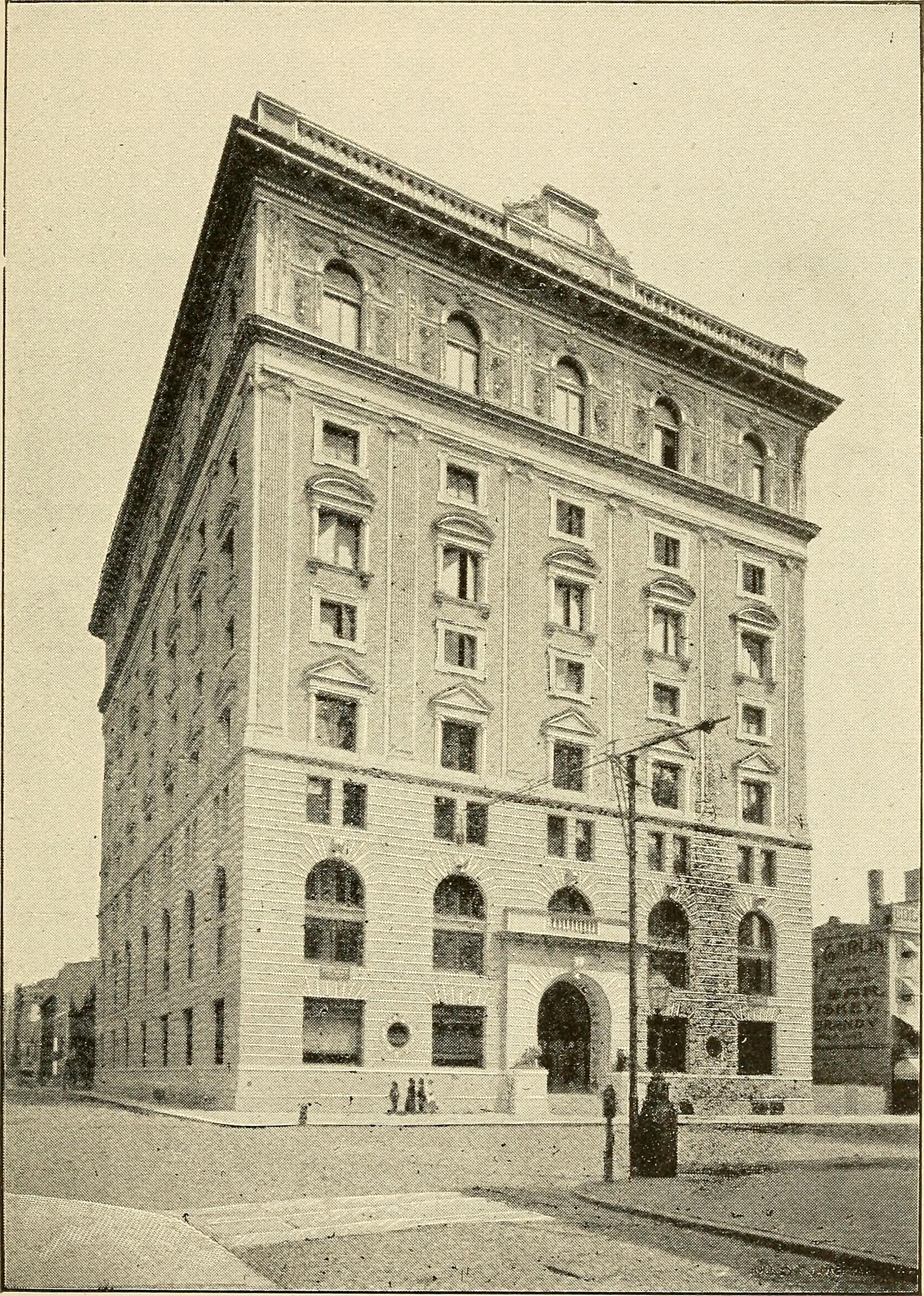
Picture of Odd Fellows’ Temple in 1900

Following the Confederate evacuation of Petersburg on the night of April 2, 1865, Maj. Gen. Edward Ord's forces, which the 55th Pennsylvania was in, began pursuing the retreating Army of Northern Virginia along the South Side Railroad. Union forces conducted a forced march, marching as far as 60 miles before reaching Burkesville Station on the evening of April 5. Ord's forces resumed the march on the following morning of April 6, marching another 7 miles, reaching Rice's station. There, the 55th led the column as skirmishers and lost 9 men as wounded. With the station secure, Ord's forces were able to cut the direct retreat route to Danville, forcing Lee's army to move toward Lynchburg. Ord's forces resumed the pursuit on April 7, covering 42 miles before reaching Appomattox Court House. During the subsequent Battle of Appomattox Court House, Maj Gen. Philip Sheridan's forces were initially engaged with the advancing Confederate forces before intentionally falling back to reveal the newly arrived Union infantry, which included the 55th. Lee recognized that their avenue of escape was completely blocked by Federal infantry, the Confederates halted their advance and presented a white flag, which would lead to the surrender of the Army of Northern Virginia.

The regiment remained in Appomattox until April 17, when it marched to Richmond via Farmville and Burkeville, arriving on April 25. The regiment was stationed on the outskirts of the city, performing fatigue and guard duties until late July. The regiment moved to Petersburg to report to Maj. Gen. Hartsuff, and from there, the detachments of the regiment were stationed at various points, such as Chesterfield, Buckingham, Cumberland, Powhatan, and Amelia counties, under orders from the Freedman's Bureau.

It was mustered out on August 30, 1865, at Petersburg, Virginia. The regiment moved to Harrisburg, where it was paid and disbanded.

== Regimental reunions and monuments ==
After the regiment was disbanded in Harrisburg, the veterans of the regiment continued to maintain ties with comrades through regimental reunions, starting in 1897 at Johnstown, which were documented by Lykens Register and Lykens Standard. On August 24, 1899, Lykens Register announced that: "The eighth annual reunion of the Fifty-fifth regiment, Pennsylvania veteran volunteers, will be held in Philadelphia, September 6, 1899, in Room 6, fifth floor, Odd Fellows’ Temple, Broad and Cherry Streets, at 6 o’clock p.m. Addresses will be made by Colonel John H. Filler and others." The newspaper explained the other members who still resided, and the newspaper also documented that "Lykens also has a share in the honors of this regiment, having furnished a number of recruits"

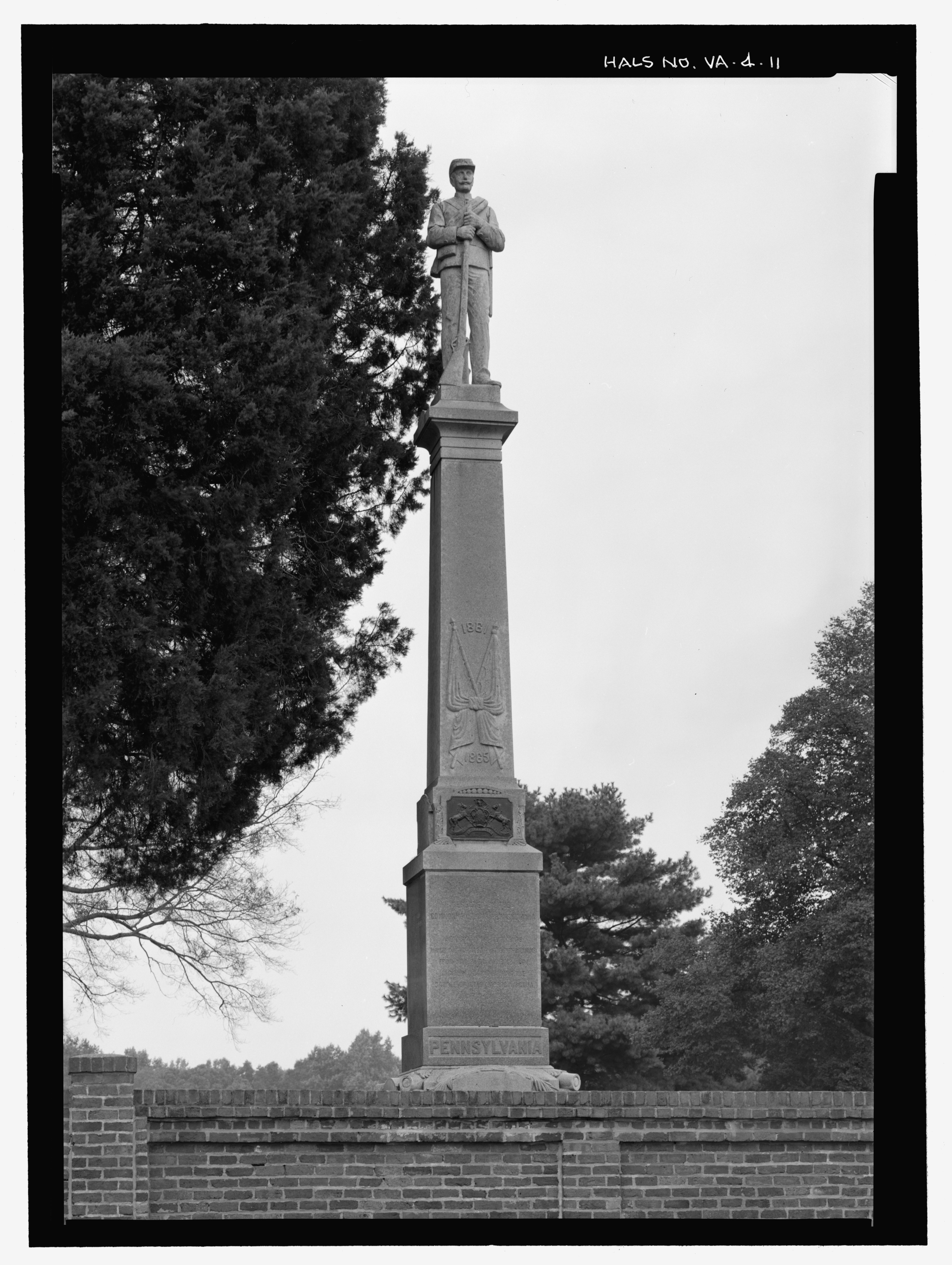
An image of the Pennsylvania Monument at Cold Harbor

In 1909, the Commonwealth of Pennsylvania erected a monument at Cold Harbor to the Pennsylvanian regiments who participated in the Battle of Cold Harbor, it stands thirty foot tall and is topped by a statue of a soldier at parade rest, on the west side of the monument mentions the various infantry regiments who took part in the battle, in which the 55th Pennsylvania is mentioned.

== Casualties ==
During its service, it lost 479 men: seven officers and 201 enlisted men killed and mortally wounded; three officers and 268 enlisted men by disease.

== Commanders ==
- Colonel Richard White (Captured at Proctor's Creek)
- Lieutenant Colonel Frank T. Bennett
- Major John H. Filler

== Notable members ==
- Sergeant Augustin D. Flanagan (Company A) - Awarded the Medal of Honor on September 29, 1864, "For extraordinary heroism on 29 September 1864, in action at Chaffin's Farm, Virginia. For gallantry in the charge on the enemy's works; rushing forward with the colors and calling upon the men to follow him; Sergeant Flanagan was severely wounded."
- Corporal Edmond L. Smith (Company H) - After the war, he served in the Colorado Territorial Legislative Assembly.

== See also ==
- List of Pennsylvania Civil War regiments
- Pennsylvania in the Civil War
