= Del Mar =

Del Mar is Spanish for "of the sea" or "from the sea". It may refer to:

== Places in the United States ==
- Del Mar, California
- Del Mar High School, located in San Jose, California
- Del Mar racetrack, located in Del Mar, California
- Del Mar Fairgrounds located in Del Mar, California

Can also refer to the Delaware/Maryland area of the Delmarva Peninsula.

== People ==
- Alexander del Mar (1836–1926), US political economist
- Ennis Del Mar, a fictional character in Brokeback Mountain
- Jonathan Del Mar (born 1951), British music editor and conductor, son of Norman
- Norman Del Mar (1919–1994), British orchestral conductor, father of Jonathan
- Walter Del Mar (1862–1944), American banker and travel writer

== Other ==
- "Del Mar" (song), by Ozuna, Doja Cat, and Sia, 2020
- Viña del Mar, a Chilean coast city
- Café del Mar, a bar located in San Antonio, Ibiza
- Del Mar, a Glasspar boats model
- Del Mar, a Spanish village in Puss in Boots: The Last Wish

== See also ==
- Delmar (disambiguation)
