= Marine plastic pollution in San Diego, California =

Marine plastic pollution negatively impacts the wildlife, ecosystem, and residents of coastal towns. From plastic bottles to nearly invisible microplastics, these pollutants disrupt the health of marine creatures as well as humans. There is an estimated 11 million metric tons of plastic entering the ocean annually and traversing the seas from coral reefs in the Caribbean to the polar ice caps. What originates on land is unable to decompose in the depths of the ocean and can injure, harm, or even kill. Wildlife are the most directly susceptible to these threats in the form of incidental consumption, entanglement, starvation, injuries, and infection. Plastic pollution takes the lives of roughly 100,000 marine mammals each year, especially sea turtles, jellyfish, and seabirds. Plastics have become a threat to human health as well as an estimated 88% of intertidal zones in San Diego contain single-use plastic. Some of the most commonly found pollutants found on San Diego beaches are plastic grocery bags, takeout containers, straws, cans, and bottles which litter the shores and pose risks for all members of the community in the form of heightening risk of disease and increasing the numbers of undetectable microplastics in seafood. San Diego Coastkeeper removed 19,880.4 pounds of trash from beaches, wetlands, and parks in 2025, over 50% of which was some form of whole or fragmented plastic pieces.

== Policy and solutions ==
Local organizations such as Surfrider San Diego and San Diego Coastkeeper work towards creating a healthier coastal environment. Through volunteer programs, beach cleanups, and advocacy for more protective policies, institutions such as these bring light to the situation and encourage better maintenance of plastic pollution from local government. In April 2023, the City of San Diego adopted a Single Use Plastic Reduction Ordinance (SUPRO) which prevented the provision of single use plastics from restaurants and other establishments unless requested by a customer. Additionally, it prohibited the dispersement of styrofoam containers . Within San Diego County, cities such as Encinitas and Del Mar are taking additional local action enforcing seven total ordinances regarding plastic pollution including a Partial Beverage Bottle Ban, Single-Use Plastic Foodware Ban, and a Single-Use Plastic Bag Ban. To raise awareness, the San Diego Natural History Museum installed a summer exhibition called Washed Ashore which was constructed almost entirely out of plastic collected from San Diego shores. The art piece depicts over 25 different species of sea creatures and serves to educate its viewers on the dangers of plastic pollution. Collectively, San Diego's non-profit organizations inspire local frameworks to create protective policies for a safer coastal community.
