= Battle of Simmon's Bluff =

Battle of the American Civil War

- Part of the American Civil War
Date	June 21, 1862
Location	Meggett, Charleston County, South Carolina 32°41′43″N 80°13′41″W
Result	Union victory

Belligerents
United States (Union)	Confederate States

Commanders and leaders
A. C. Rhind	James McCullough

Units involved
55th Pennsylvania Infantry; USS Crusader (1858)	16th South Carolina Infantry; Marion Artillery

Strength
1 regiment 1 gunboat 1 transport	1 regiment

Casualties and losses
0	0

The Battle of Simmon's Bluff was a minor and bloodless Union victory, fought June 21, 1862, in Meggett, South Carolina, during the American Civil War.

Union forces had laid siege to Charleston, which was being resupplied from a nearby railroad. Union forces were eager to capture the city, so they sent the 55th Pennsylvania Infantry regiment to sever the rail line. The 55th Pennsylvania departed by sea shortly before the battle in search of a place to land closer to the railroad. On June 21, the 55th Pennsylvania came ashore at Wadmalaw Sound. Union forces discovered an encampment of the 16th South Carolina Infantry regiment, and quickly razed the encampment and engaged the Confederate forces. The Confederates scattered after the encampment was razed and were unable to launch an effective counterattack. There were no reports of injuries on either side. After the raid, the Union forces returned to their ships and abandoned their original objective, which was to interrupt the rail line to Charleston.

== Gallery ==
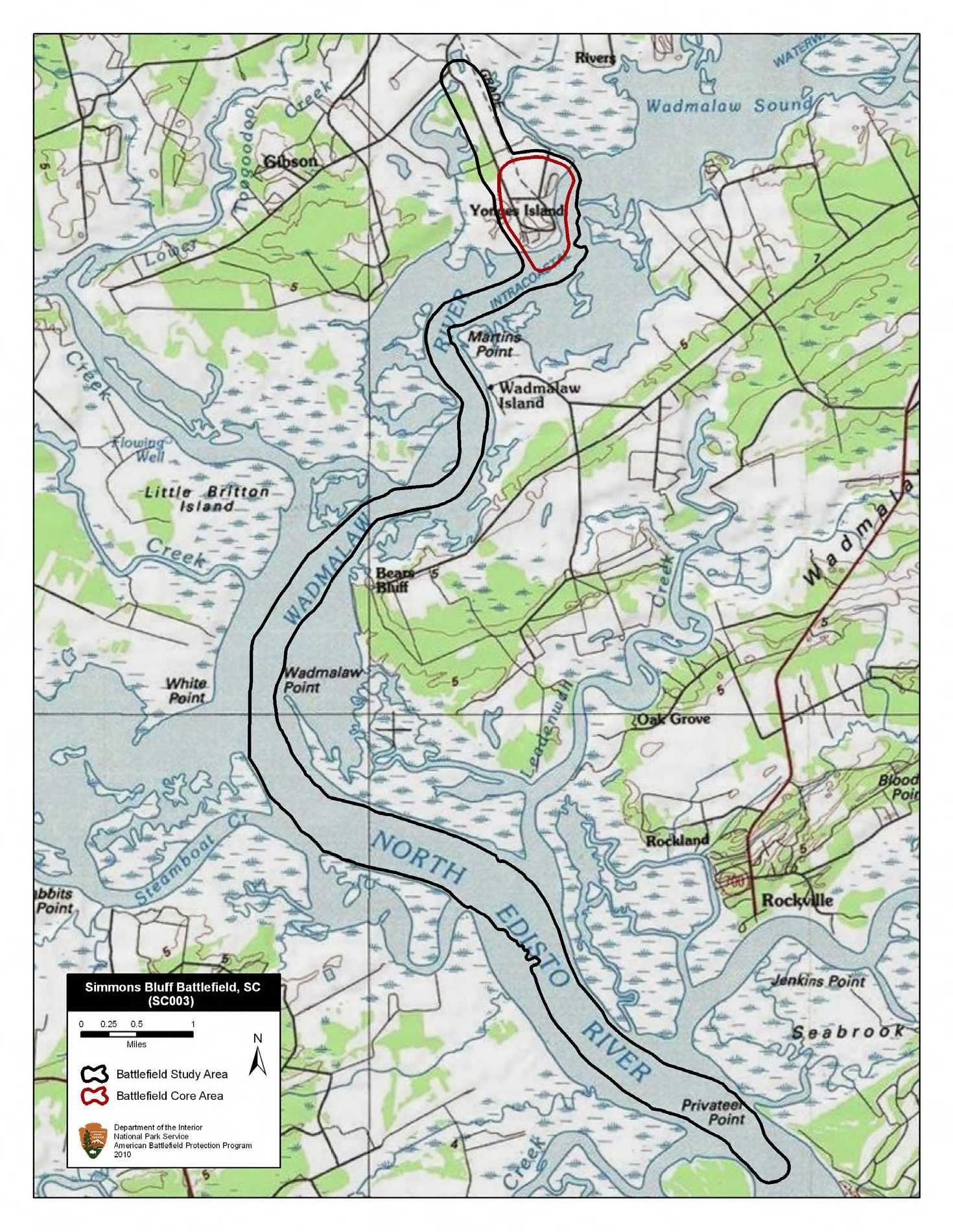
Map of Simon's Bluff Battlefield core and study areas by the American Battlefield Protection Program.

== Sources ==
- CWSAC Report Update
