= Delmer =

Delmer may refer to:

== People ==
- Célestin Delmer (1907–1996), French footballer
- Deborah Delmer, American plant pathologist
- Isabel Nicholas (1912–1992), also known as Isabel Delmer, British painter, scenery designer and occasional model
- Sefton Delmer (1904–1979), British journalist and Second World War propagandist
- Delmer Berg (1915–2016), last surviving American veteran of the Abraham Lincoln Brigade, which fought in the Spanish Civil War
- Delmer Brown (1909–2011), American academic, historian, author, translator and Japanologist
- Delmer Daves (1904–1977), American screenwriter, film director and film producer
- Del Ennis (1925–1996), American Major League Baseball player
- Del Harris (born 1937), American basketball coach
- Delmer J. Yoakum (1915–1996), American painter and designer
- Delmer Ferreira Jaines (born 1974), Brazilian footballer

== Places ==
- Delmer, Kentucky, United States, an unincorporated community
- Delmer, Texas, United States, an unincorporated community
- Delmer, a community within the township of South-West Oxford, Ontario, Canada
