= Augustin D. Flanagan =

American soldier (1844–1924)

- Born: August 10, 1844; Loretto, Pennsylvania, U.S.
- Died: January 22, 1924 (aged 79); Tecumseh, Nebraska, U.S.
- Burial place: Tecumseh Cemetery
- Military career
- Allegiance: United States of America
- Branch: United States Army
- Rank: Sergeant
- Units: Company A, 55th Pennsylvania Infantry
- Conflicts: Battle of Chaffin's Farm
- Awards: Medal of Honor

Sergeant Augustin D. Flanagan (August 10, 1844 – January 22, 1924) was an American soldier who fought in the American Civil War. Flanagan received the United States' highest award for bravery during combat, the Medal of Honor, for his action during the Battle of Chaffin's Farm in Virginia on September 29, 1864. He was honored with the award on April 6, 1865.

== Biography ==
Flanagan was born in Loretto, Pennsylvania, on August 10, 1844. He later enlisted into the 55th Pennsylvania Infantry. He died on January 22, 1924, and his remains are interred at Tecumseh Cemetery in Nebraska.

== Medal of Honor citation ==
The President of the United States of America, in the name of Congress, takes pleasure in presenting the Medal of Honor to Sergeant Augustin D. Flanagan, United States Army, for extraordinary heroism on 29 September 1864, while serving with Company A, 55th Pennsylvania Infantry, in action at Chaffin's Farm, Virginia. For gallantry in the charge on the enemy's works; rushing forward with the colors and calling upon the men to follow him; Sergeant Flanagan was severely wounded.

== See also ==
- List of American Civil War Medal of Honor recipients: A–F
