= Alexander del Mar =

American historian

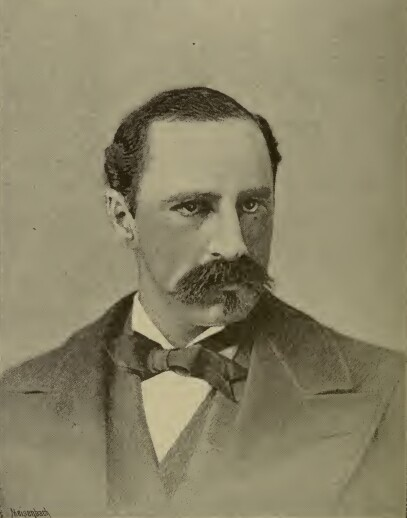
- del Mar
- Born: August 9, 1836; New York, New York, U.S.
- Died: July 1, 1926 (aged 89); Little Falls, New Jersey, U.S.
- Occupations: Political economist, historian, numismatist, author

Alexander del Mar (aka Alexander Del Mar and Alexander Delmar; August 9, 1836 – July 1, 1926) was an American political economist, historian, numismatist and author. (Note: In business affairs he was frequently referred to in contemporary reports and newspapers as Delmar; however, many of his published works appeared under the name of del Mar. He sometimes appended the letters C.E. and/or M.E. (respectively "Civil Engineer" and "Mining Engineer") to his name.) He was the first Director of the Bureau of Statistics at the U.S. Treasury Department from 1866 to 1869. (Note: The US Treasury Department's Bureau of Statistics (1866–1903) should not be confused with the Bureau of Statistics of the US State Department (1874–1897). The two were eventually merged in 1903 under the Department of Commerce and Labor. See "Records of the Bureau of Economic Analysis". National Archive guide to Federal records. August 15, 2016.)

Del Mar was a rigorous historian who made important contributions to the history of money. During the mid-1890s, he was distinctly hostile to a central monetary role for gold as commodity money, championing the cause of silver and its re-monetization as a prerogative of the state.

He believed strongly in the legal function of money. Del Mar dedicated much of his free time to original research in the great libraries and coin collections of Europe on the history of monetary systems and finance.

== Biography ==
Alexander del Mar, of Jewish-Spanish descent, was born in New York City, August 9, 1836, as oldest son of Jacob and Belvidere Alexander del Mar. He lived for a short period of time in the United Kingdom with his uncle Emanuel del Mar and there received an education in humanities from a private tutor, Arthur Helps (later knighted, becoming Sir Arthur Helps). He was instructed in history, literature, law, and political economy.

After graduating from New York University as a civil engineer, he was educated as a mining engineer in Spain at the Madrid School of Mines.

Aged 18, he returned to the U.S. in 1854 to become the financial editor of the short-lived Daily American Times. He moved to Hunt's Merchant's Magazine in 1860, and in 1863 co-founded and edited with Simon Stern the prestigious quarterly New York Social Science Review (first published in January 1865). He was also involved with the Commercial & Financial Chronicle, founded in 1865 by William Dana.

In 1865, Del Mar, a notorious Free Trader, helped establish the first Free Trade organization in the United States, the American Free Trade League (AFTL), alongside Horace White, William Lloyd Garrison, and Ralph Waldo Emerson, among others.

In 1866, Del Mar was appointed as the first Director of US Treasury Department's Bureau of Statistics (now part of the Bureau of Economic Analysis). At the time the bureau was a board of trade, with executive functions, among others the supervision of the commissioners of mines, commerce, immigration, etc. Del Mar pioneered the use of a modern and scientific approach to statistics. He remained director until 1869, overseeing numerous reports. He was forced to resign by his superior, David Ames Wells, and was replaced by Francis Amasa Walker. Both were ardent supporters of specie money and opposed to Del Mar's convictions of fiat money.

In 1866, he was appointed the American delegate to the International Monetary Congress which met in Turin, Italy.

During the close-fought 1868 presidential election, he was nominated for Secretary of the Treasury under Horatio Seymour's Democratic ticket.

In 1869, he purchased the Washington-based National Intelligencer, merged it with the Washington Express and moved its offices to New York in January 1870. It later became the New York City and National Intelligencer which he edited and published until 1872.

He ran under Horace Greeley's ticket for Secretary of the Treasury during the 1872 United States presidential election. The coalition between the Democrats and Greeley's Liberal Republican Party was soundly defeated, and the LRP ceased to exist shortly after. In the same year Del Mar represented the United States at the international monetary congress in St. Petersburg, Russia.

In 1877, Del Mar was appointed mining commissioner to the U.S. Monetary Commission. This commission was created by Congress in 1876 when it discovered the subterfuge that led to the Panic of 1873. It was charged to investigate:

(1) Into the change which has taken place in the relative value of gold and silver; the causes thereof, whether permanent or otherwise; the effects thereof upon trade, commerce, finance, and the productive interests of the country and upon the standard of value in this and foreign countries.

(2) Into the policy of the restoration of the double standard in this country; and, if restored, what the legal relation between the two coins, silver and gold, should be.

(3) Into the policy of continuing legal-tender notes concurrently with the metallic standards, and the effects thereof upon the labor, industries, and wealth of the country; and

(4) Into the best means for providing for facilitating the resumption of specie payments.

Although the commission reported unfavourably on the switch to the de facto gold standard and recommended a return to silver, gold's status as a reserve currency was to remain unchallenged until the 1930s.

In 1878, Del Mar was appointed as clerk to the United States House Committee on Expenditures in the Navy Department.

In 1878, Del Mar also wrote a series of letters under the Chinese pseudonym "Kwang Chang Ling" in the San Francisco Argonaut journal. The letters warned Californians, and the broader United States, that China had the potential to rise as an economic giant. Del Mar, as Kwang Chang Ling, argued that excluding cheap Chinese labor to protect American wages and lessen unemployment would do little to protect American laborers in the long term, for China's labor force would continue to pose a global economic threat despite national policies. Del Mar's writings are the first known attempt to use Free Trade rhetoric as a solution to the "Chinese Question" and to counter anti-Chinese attitudes that led to the 1882 Chinese Exclusion Act.

In 1879, he published his History of the Precious Metals, the labor of twenty-two years of research during his own free time. From 1880 onwards, he mainly devoted his professional career to writing.

In 1881, he published A History of Money in Ancient States, in 1885 Money and Civilization, in 1889 The Science of Money, in 1895, A History of Monetary Systems in Modern States, in 1899 A History of Monetary Crimes, in 1900 A History of Money in America, in 1903 A History of Monetary Systems of France. Del Mar also published several archaeological treatises.

Del Mar was the New York state chairman of the Silver Party, and spoke at its 1896 Chicago meeting in support of William Jennings Bryan.

He was editor-in-chief of the American Banker, 1905–1906.

Alexander del Mar died at his daughter's home in Little Falls, New Jersey on July 1, 1926, at the age of 89. Upon his death, he donated his private library of 15,000 volumes to the American Bankers Association.

== Family life ==
With his first wife, the former Emily Joseph (the daughter of Joseph L. Joseph), he had eleven children, seven that survived to adulthood, including five sons, Walter, Eugene, Harry, Algernon, and William; and two daughters, Francesca Paloma del Mar, who trained as an artist, and Maud (Blackwelder) del Mar. With his second wife, the former Alice Florence Berg, he had 9 children, including six sons and three daughters: Edward, Juanita, May, Frank, Sidney, Albert, Eric, Hugo, and Irene.

== Quotes ==
- John Stuart Mill spoke highly about Del Mar:

Del Mar is a remarkable writer. There is stuff in him. He is the sort of man you need in America. He knows what he is about. He is the sort of man to put things right in your country, or in any country.

- From Del Mar's 1895 book History of Monetary Systems:

In the United States the same bag of coins often masquerades now as the reserve of one bank, and now of another. How far similar subterfuges are employed in the various private banking establishments of Germany is not known, and in the absence of such knowledge it is deemed safer to include the entire paper issues in the circulation. This at least is a known quantity; the " reserves," as experience has too often and too sadly proved, may only exist in the playful imagination of that fortunate class who have secured the prerogative to issue bank money.

- A la mort, l'argent! (Silver until I die!)

== Selected bibliography ==
- del Mar, Alexander, (1862). Gold money and paper money. New York: Anson D.F. Randolph. (Pamphlet) (Cornell University Library reprint 200 ... ISBN 978-1-4297-2841-6)
- del Mar, Alexander (1864). The great paper bubble: or the coming financial explosion. New York: Office of the Metropolitan Record.
- del Mar, Alexander, (1866). Statistics of the world. Washington (DC): Government Press. (Pamphlet)
- "Emile Walter" (del Mar, Alexander, pseud.) (1867). What is free trade? An adaptation of Frederick Bastiat's "Sophismes economiques". New York: G.P. Putnam and Son. (repr. Dodo Press, 2009 ISBN 978-1-4099-3812-5)
- del Mar, Alexander, (1867). History of money and civilization. (repr. NY: Burt Franklin, 1969)
- del Mar, Alexander, (1867) Decadence of American shipbuilding. Washington: Government Press
- del Mar, Alexander (1867). Statistics of the United States: Compiled Under the Authority of the Secretary of the Treasury ... for Transmission to the U. S. Commissioner General for the "Paris Exposition" of 1867. Treasury Department.
- del Mar, Alexander, (1868). The whiskey tax for 100 Years. Washington (DC): Congressional Subcommittee on Retrenchment.
- del Mar, Alexander, (1878). Why should the Chinese go? : a pertinent inquiry from a mandarin high in authority. San Francisco: Bruce's Book & Job Printing House. [N.B. del Mar states the case for not expelling the Chinese workers.]
- del Mar, Alexander, (1879). Usury and the jews: a lecture delivered at Steinway Hall, February 11th, 1879. San Francisco (CA): I.N. Choynski. (Pamphlet) [Not available online as of November 2013, but its contents are summarised in Brooke-Rose, Christine, (1971). A ZBC of Ezra Pound. University of California Press, pp. 223–5.]
- del Mar, Alexander, (1880) The history of money in ancient countries from the earliest times to the present. London: George Bell and Sons. (repr. Kessinger Publishing, 2003 ISBN 0-7661-9024-2)
- del Mar, Alexander, (1885), (2nd ed., 1899). The science of money. London, George Bell and Sons. (repr. Kessinger Publishing, 2008 ISBN 1-4372-8281-4)
- del Mar, Alexander, (1887) "Silver". Encyclopedia Britannica, 9th Edition, Vol. XXII, pp. 70–74 (signed A. De.)
- del Mar, Alexander (1885), (2nd ed., 1901). History of the precious metals from the earliest times to the present. London: George Bell and Sons. (repr. Kessinger Publishing, 2004 ISBN 0-7661-9054-4)
- del Mar, Alexander, (1895). History of monetary systems. New York: Cambridge Encyclopedia Co. (repr. NY: A.M. Kelley, 1978)
- del Mar, Alexander, (1899) The history of money in America, from the earliest times to the constitution. New York: Cambridge Encyclopedia Co. (repr. NY: Burt Franklin, 1968)
- del Mar, Alexander, (1899). Barbara Villiers: or a history of monetary crimes. New York: Groseclose, Money & Man. (repr. Omni Publications, 1967,1983)
- del Mar, Alexander, (1899). The worship of Augustus Caesar: derived from a study of coins, monuments, calendars, eras, and astronomical and astrological cycles, the whole establishing a new chronology and survey of history and religion. New York: Cambridge Encyclopedia Co.
- del Mar, Alexander, (1899). Ancient Britain in the light of modern archaeological discoveries. New York: Cambridge Encyclopedia Co.
- del Mar, Alexander, (1900). The middle ages revisited; or, the Roman government and religion and their relations to Britain. New York: Cambridge Encyclopedia Co.

Some works by Del Mar were announced but apparently not printed, including The politics of money and The history of money in modern countries.

== See also ==
- Coinage Act of 1873
- Free silver
- Monetary reform
- Black Friday (1869) Covers the gold scandal of 1869.
- Veil of money
- Money illusion
- Criticism of fractional-reserve banking
- Stephen Zarlenga
- American Monetary Institute
