= Roswell S. Ripley =

American general, author, and businessman

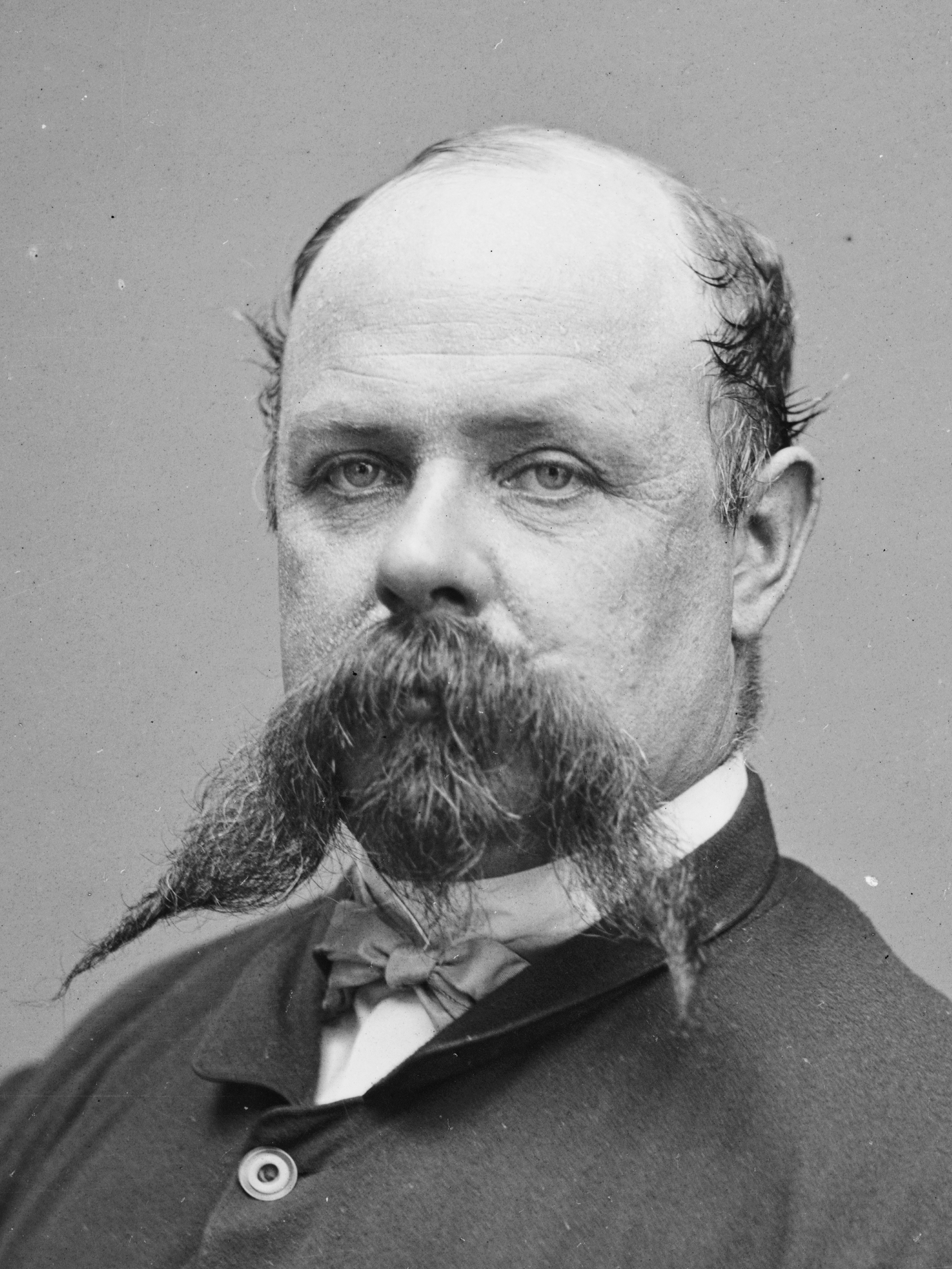
- Born: March 14, 1823; Worthington, Ohio, U.S.
- Died: March 29, 1887 (aged 64); New York City, U.S.
- Burial place: Magnolia Cemetery, Charleston
- Military career
- Allegiance: United States; Confederate States of America
- Branch: United States Army; Confederate States Army
- Service years: 1843–1853 (USA), 1861–1865 (CSA)
- Rank: Brevet Major (USA); Brigadier General (CSA)
- Conflicts: U.S.-Mexican War: Battle of Monterey; Battle of Veracruz; Battle of Cerro Gordo; Battle of Contreras; Battle of Churubusco; Battle of Molino del Rey; Battle of Chapultepec; Battle of Mexico City; Seminole Wars; American Civil War; Battle of Fort Sumter; Battle of Mechanicsville; Battle of Gaines Mill; Battle of Malvern Hill; Battle of South Mountain; Battle of Antietam; Battle of Fredericksburg; Charleston Harbor

Roswell Sabine Ripley (March 14, 1823 – March 29, 1887) was an officer in the United States Army during the Mexican–American War, a brigadier general in the Confederate States Army during the Civil War. He was also an author and a prosperous South Carolina businessman.

== Early life and career ==
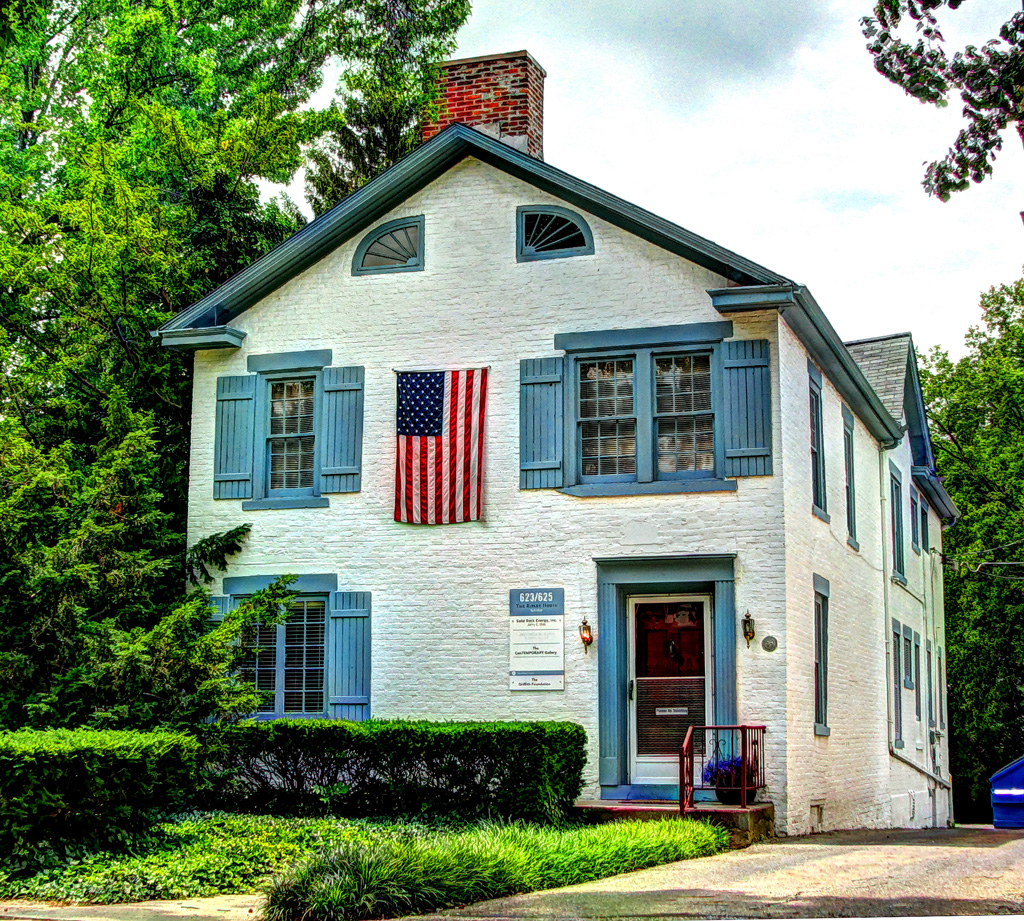
Ripley House in Worthington

Ripley was born in Worthington, Ohio, a small village in Franklin County not far from Columbus. His family relocated to the state of New York, where he received an appointment to the United States Military Academy. He graduated in 1843, ranked 7th out of 39 cadets. Other classmates in his year included Ulysses S. Grant, William B. Franklin, Samuel G. French and Franklin Gardner. He was assigned as a second lieutenant to garrison duty, as well as becoming an artillery instructor.

Lieutenant Ripley served in the Mexican–American War on the staffs of Gen. Zachary Taylor and Gen. Gideon Pillow, and saw action at the battles of Monterey, Vera Cruz, Cerro Gordo, Contreras, Churubusco, Molino del Rey, Chapultepec, and the capture of Mexico City. For gallantry in action, Ripley was brevetted captain for Cerro Gordo and major for Chapultepec. He published a History of the Mexican War (2 vols., New York, 1849).

He was engaged in the Second Seminole War in Florida in 1849, where again he saw combat. Following the war, he was on garrison duty in various posts in the South, including Fort Moultrie on Sullivan's Island, South Carolina. Also living on the island was a wealthy widow, Alicia (Middleton) Sparks (1824–1899), from Charleston. They married in 1852. The novelist William Gilmore Simms was living on the island at the time, and tells of an incident during their courtship involving Ripley's boots and a barman. Alicia's uncle was Arthur Middleton Manigault, later a Confederate general.

Ripley resigned from the army in 1853 and moved to Charleston to settle his wife's estates. From 1853–1854 he was the publisher, along with Charles G. Baylor, of the Baltimore Daily American Times. He later established a successful business, and, over time, Ripley became a supporter of states rights.

He joined the South Carolina state militia and became a major of ordnance.

== Civil War ==
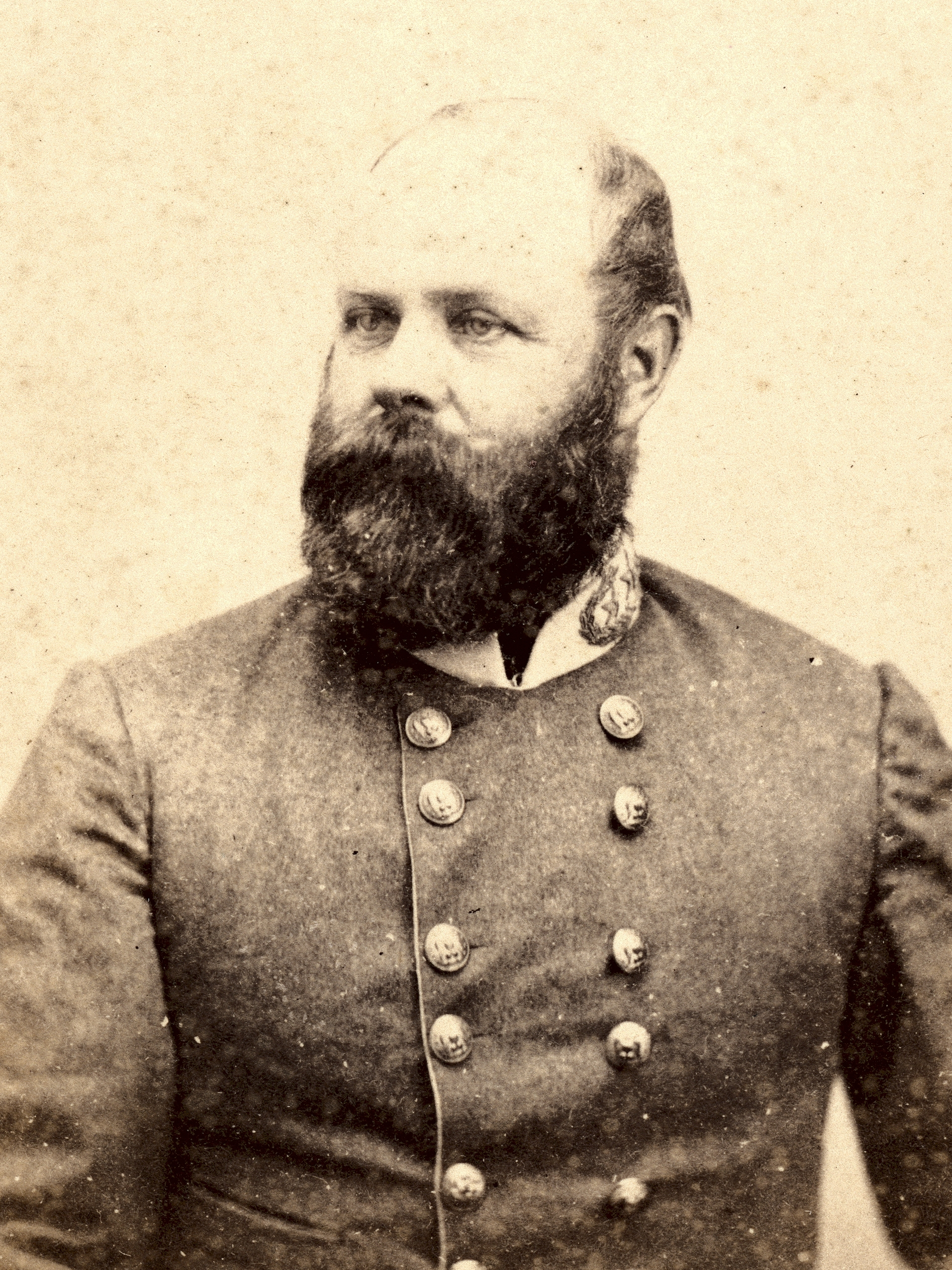
Ripley in the Civil War

After South Carolina seceded from the Union, Ripley became a lieutenant colonel in the Army of South Carolina. He and his men garrisoned in Fort Moultrie. He directed the fort during the bombardment of Fort Sumter in Charleston Harbor on April 13, 1861. On August 15, 1861, he was appointed as a brigadier general in the Confederate Army and assigned command of the Department of South Carolina and its coastal defenses. From December 1861 until May 1862, he had charge of the Second Military District of South South Carolina. In the Spring of 1862, slave Robert Smalls along with a slave crew, stole from Charleston Harbor a high-pressure side-wheeler steam powered ship, the 147-foot long “Planter”. Brigadier General Roswell S Ripley was astonished when his troops told him that the “Planter” had vanished from her berth directly in front of Ripley’s headquarters on the Charleston wharf.

Transferred to field command in Virginia, Ripley commanded an infantry brigade (comprising two Georgia and two North Carolina regiments) in the defenses of Richmond, Virginia, in June 1862. Assigned to the Army of Northern Virginia, Ripley's Brigade participated in the battles of Mechanicsville, Gaines Mill, and Malvern Hill during the Peninsula Campaign.

Despite being depleted from recent fighting and illness, Ripley's Brigade fought in the Maryland Campaign at the Battle of South Mountain and the Battle of Sharpsburg in September 1862. He suffered a severe wound in the neck at Sharpsburg, but soon recovered and rejoined the army. In November, he was involved in the defense of Fredericksburg.

Criticized for his performance at Antietam, General Ripley returned to South Carolina in early 1863 and took charge of the First Military District. His men constructed a series of improved defenses around Charleston, and Ripley commanded the troops that repelled a Union Navy attack on April 7, 1863. He continued in command of Charleston's fortifications until the city was evacuated in mid-February 1865 and fought under Joseph E. Johnston at the Battle of Bentonville.

== Postbellum ==
After the war, Ripley went abroad and resided in England for over twenty years. His wife and daughter had left him to return to Charleston. In the late 1880s, he returned to the United States and settled in New York City, where he died of a massive stroke. He was buried in Magnolia Cemetery in Charleston, South Carolina.

His uncle, James Wolfe Ripley, had led the Federal troops in Charleston Harbor during the Nullification Crisis, and was the Chief of Ordnance of the U.S. Army during the first half of the Civil War.

== Recent Developments ==
With the recent efforts to remove monuments and memorials related to the Confederacy, in August 2017 the city of Worthington, Ohio, in conjunction with a private property owner, removed an Ohio state marker from outside of the home where Ripley was born.

== See also ==
- List of American Civil War generals (Confederate)
