= USS Crusader (1858) =

Gunboat of the United States Navy

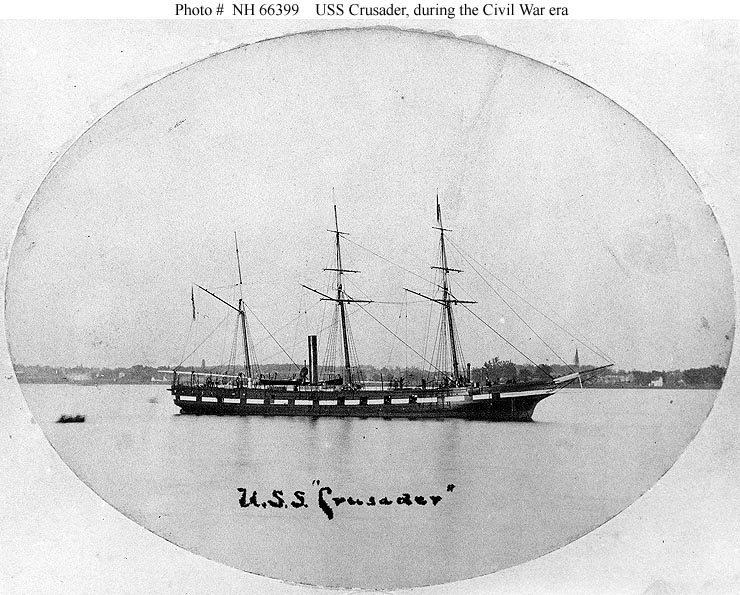

History

United States
- Ordered: as Chowan
- Launched: May 1857
- Acquired: October 1858 by the U.S. Navy
- Commissioned: 27 October 1858
- Decommissioned: 13 June 1865 at the Washington Navy Yard
- Renamed: Southern Star, Crusader
- Fate: Sold, 20 July 1865

General characteristics
- Displacement: 545 tons
- Length: 169 ft (52 m)
- Beam: 28 ft (8.5 m)
- Draft: 12 ft 6 in (3.81 m)
- Propulsion: steam engine; screw-propelled
- Speed: 8 knots (15 km/h)
- Complement: 92
- Armament: four 32-pounder guns; eight 24-pounder guns; one 12-pounder gun

USS Crusader was a screw steamer of the United States Navy that served prior to, and during, the American Civil War.

Crusader was heavily armed and was used in a "gunboat diplomacy" role when the United States needed to place political pressure on Paraguay. After completing that mission, she returned to the United States to participate as a gunboat in the blockade of the Confederate States of America.

== Service history ==
Originally named Chowan the ship was launched in 1857 in Murfreesboro, North Carolina. Four months later, its draftsman and builder, John K. Kirkham filed papers at the Hertford County Court for a lien for payment of $4,996 owed to him by the North Carolina and New York Steamship Company. She was seized by Sheriff John A. Vann. In February 1858, a jury awarded $2,287.36 to Kirkham and the court ordered that the ship be sold at auction on 4 May. Chowan was purchased by John W. Southall and Capt. Thomas W. Badger and renamed Southern Star. In early 1858 she was towed to Delaware where she was fitted with engines. She then steamed to Norfolk in September 1858 under her own power for final outfitting for hauling freight between the West Indies and ports along the east coast of North America.

=== US Navy service ===
The US Navy approached its owners and chartered the vessel in October 1858 to be part of a 19 ship squadron military-diplomatic expedition to Paraguay to settle grievances growing out of an unprovoked attack on Water Witch by Paraguayan forces in 1855. Commissioned 27 October 1858, Commander A. M. Pennock in command, Southern Star sailed 2 November for Asunción, Paraguay, arriving 25 January 1859. Her mission accomplished, she departed from Montevideo, Uruguay, 22 March to return to Norfolk's Gosport Navy Yard. Satisfied with her performance, she was purchased by the Navy for $49,000 and renamed Crusader. She was outfitted as a gunboat at Gosport with four 12-pound cannons and numerous lighter arms.

On 11 June 1859, Lieutenant John N. Maffitt was assigned as her first commanding officer as Crusader. She left the Brooklyn Navy Yard for naval service in August 1859. Crusader cleared Philadelphia, Pennsylvania 7 October 1859 for duty with the Home Squadron in the suppression of the slave trade in West Indian waters until 7 February 1861, returning to New York City 16 February. She made national headlines when on 23 May 1860 she intercepted a slave ship carrying 450 Africans, the first of the four slave traders and one pirate ship she apprehended.

Following another tour of duty in the Gulf of Mexico from 16 March to 28 August 1861, during which she captured two vessels to prevent their sale for use as Confederate privateers, she was placed out of commission 17 September 1861 for repairs. Crusader sailed 18 January 1862 to join the South Atlantic Blockading Squadron. She cruised off the South Carolina coast until 10 August. With E. B. Hale she conducted a successful expedition up the South Edisto River on 28 April to capture a Confederate battery, the officers and men of both ships earning a commendation from the Secretary of the Navy for their courageous conduct. On a similar raid Crusader and Planter drove off a band of Confederates from Simmons' Bluff and destroyed their camp on 21 June.

After repairs at New York, Crusader put to sea 22 September 1862 to join the North Atlantic Blockading Squadron. She was diverted to duty in the Chesapeake Bay and inland waters of Virginia and served in this area until the end of the war. She captured five vessels with valuable cargoes and destroyed four others. Crusader was decommissioned at Washington Navy Yard 13 June 1865 and sold there 20 July 1865.
