= Nashville Daily American =

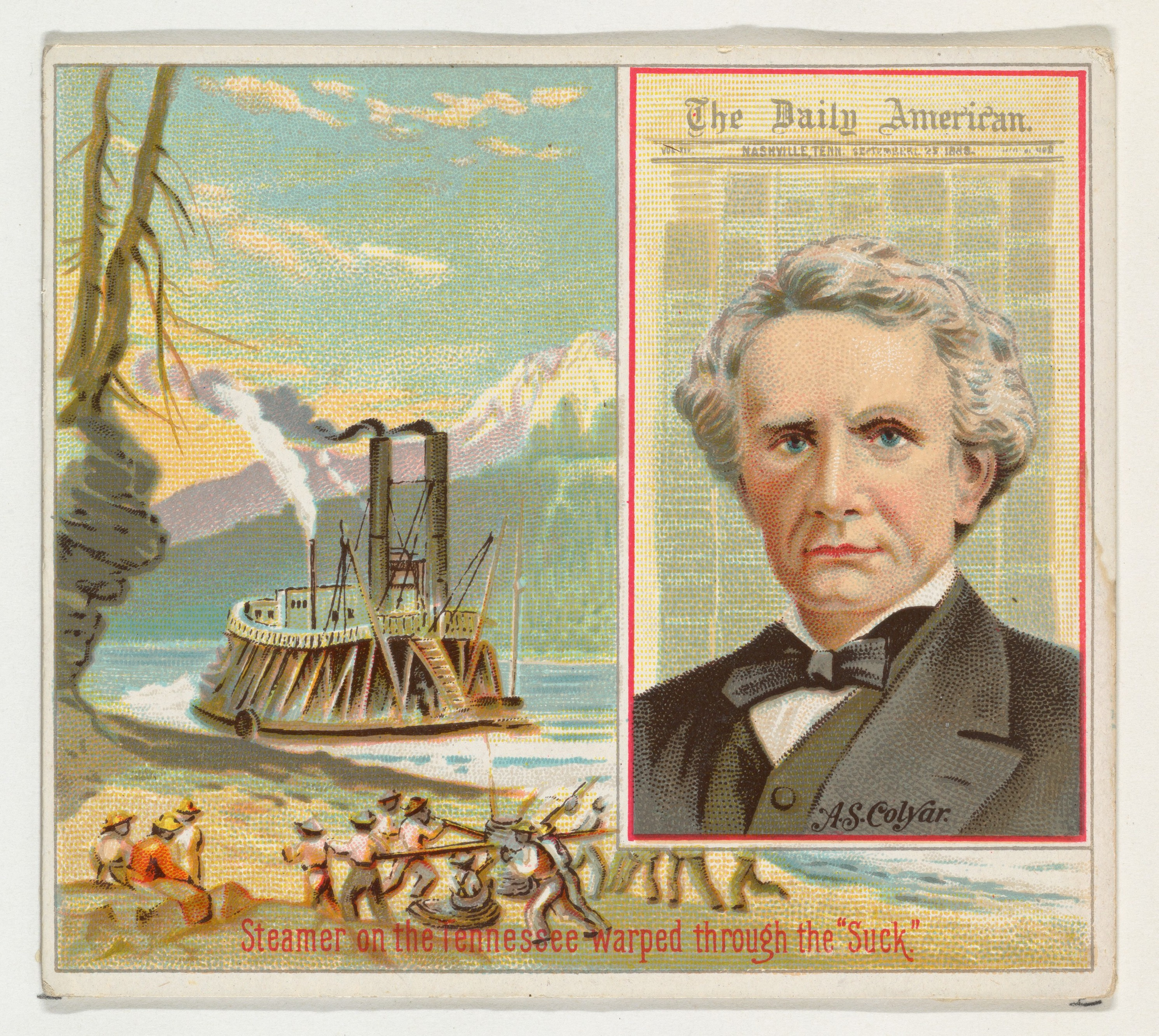
- Allen & Ginter American Editors trading card series depiction of Colyar
- Editor: Arthur St. Clair Colyar

The Nashville Daily American, also published as the Daily American and Nashville American, (c. 1876–1910) was a newspaper in Nashville, Tennessee. It sponsored the Nashville Americans baseball team. It was acquired by The Tennessean in 1911.

Arthur St. Clair Colyar served as editor. He was one of those featured on trading cards as part of an Allen & Ginter cigarette advertising depicting American newspaper editors.

== History ==
The paper was preceded by the Nashville Union and Nashville American, Democratic Party-aligned publications. They combined to form the Nashville Union and American.

Editor George G. Poindexter and Allen A. Hall of the Nashville Daily News had a rivalry. After Poindexter accused Hall of being an abolitionist the heat and intensity increased and threats were exchanged. When Poindexter went to Hall's office he was shot and killed. Feuding at Tennessee newspapers was lampooned in Mark Twain's short story "Journalism in Tennessee", based on his experiences as a printer and journalist in Tennessee in the 1850s. The paper suspended publication during the American Civil War and resumed in 1865 and went through a series of name changes, publishing regimes, and mergers.

In 1888, the Nashville Daily American was purchased by colonels Duncan Cooper, Spurrell Hill, and John Childress. It was changed to a "tariff reform journal" with Cooper acting as editor-in-chief.

Milton B. Ochs, managing editor of the Chattanooga Times and Thomas R. Preston, a banker, bought the Nashville American around February 1909. Control of the paper transferred to Ochs on March 10, 1909. Around June 1910, the paper published a 180-page special edition of the newspaper to celebrate the Nashville American's 98th year anniversary. The New York Times covered the special issue, stating, "...the magnitude of The American's achievement can be computed, and to some degree realized, even by those who know nothing about the mechanical difficulties that had to be overcome in producing and distributing a paper of such enormous size."

Ochs managed the paper for 18 months, and after Ochs' resignation as publisher, the paper was sold again; In 1910, the Nashville American was sold to Luke Lea and others, who controlled and published the Nashville Tennessean, with the plan to merge the two newspapers.
