= Delmar (surname) =

Delmar is a surname of Spanish origin, meaning "of the sea". Notable people with the surname include:

- Eugene Delmar (1841-1909), American chess master
- Ferdinand Moritz Delmar (1781 - 1858), Prussian banking baron
- Viña Delmar (1903–1990), American novelist
- Kenny Delmar (1910–1984), American actor
- Elaine Delmar (1939–), British singer
