= Delmar station (disambiguation) =

Delmar station could refer to:

- Del Mar station, a light rail station in Pasadena, California
- Del Mar station, a former Amtrak station in Del Mar, California, replaced in 1995 by Solana Beach station
- Delmar station (Iowa), a disused train station
- Delmar Boulevard station, a disused train station in St. Louis, Missouri
- Delmar Loop station, a light rail station beneath the aforementioned Delmar Boulevard station in St. Louis, Missouri
