= Daily American (Illinois) =

Newspaper in West Frankfort, Illinois

- Type: Daily newspaper
- Owner: Gannett
- Publisher: Jim Murphy
- Editor: Alec Ramsay
- Founded: March 1, 1920
- Ceased publication: May 10, 2015
- Headquarters: 11 South Emma Street, West Frankfort, Illinois 62896, United States
- ISSN: 1089-4209
- Website: dailyamericannews.com

The Daily American was an American daily newspaper in West Frankfort, Illinois, in operation from March 1920 until March 2015.

In 1987, the paper was acquired by Hollinger. Former owner GateHouse Media purchased roughly 160 daily and weekly newspapers from Hollinger in 1997. GateHouse also owns The Benton Evening News, another daily covering Franklin County, Illinois. On April 1, 2015, Gatehouse Media announced that the Daily American would cease publication the week of May 10, 2015, ending nearly a century of providing local and national news to the residents of the West Frankfort area.
