= Daily American Times =

Newspaper published in Baltimore, Maryland, from 1853–1854

The Daily American Times was a newspaper published in Baltimore, Maryland, from 1853–1854.

== History ==
The Daily American Times was first published on 8 August 1853 by C. G. Baylor & Co., publishers, and edited by Francis H. Davidge. In September the publishers were: Charles G. Baylor, a vocal proponent of direct trade for the Southern states; Roswell S. Ripley (later a Confederate Brigadier General); and Charles W. Brush (possibly a New York attorney). Ripley and Brush retired from the concern in March 1854, and it was continued as an afternoon journal by C. G. Baylor alone.

During the night of April 21, 1854 the American Times office was mobbed by a lawless crowd, and the press, type, etc., destroyed. Baylor immediately issued a statement to the public in which he stated his grievances, and promised a continuation of the journal as soon as he could repair the damage.

Within a short time the 18-year-old Alexander del Mar in his first full-time employment was hired as the financial editor, and in June 1854 the Daily American Times came out fully in support of the Democrats. The paper united with the short-lived Baltimore Public Ledger, and was published under the name of Times and Ledger. The paper ceased publication in Baltimore on 4 July 1854.

However, it may have continued to be published in New York: on March 7, 1855 an employee of the Daily American Times of 196 Fulton-street, New York, complained to the Mayor's office that he had not been paid $9.13 owed to him.
