= Walter Del Mar =

American journalist

Walter Del Mar (May 28, 1862, New York City – April 10, 1944, New York City) was a banker, stock broker, journalist, world traveller, and author of travel books.

His father was the economist and historian Alexander Del Mar, a New Yorker from a Marrano family. Walter Del Mar had thirteen siblings, of whom two sisters and four brothers survived to adulthood. During the early 1890s he was a financial correspondent in London. There he established his own banking firm, which became the London representative for several important American companies. In the first decade of the 20th century he travelled extensively in Asia and wrote three books about his travels. In 1914 he returned to New York City and lived there until his death in 1944.

Walter Del Mar bequeathed his letters, business papers, travel writings, and photograph albums to the New York Public Library. A lifelong bachelor, he was survived by two sisters and three brothers and their children.

== Selected publications ==
- Around the World Through Japan. Macmillan. 1902.
- India of To-day. A. and C. Black. 1905.
- The Romantic East: Burma, Assam, & Kashmir. A. and C. Black. 1906.
- Rules of Russian Bank. E.V. Brokaw & Bro. 1920.
