= Delmer, Texas =

Unincorporated community in Cherokee County, Texas, United States

- Unincorporated community
- Location within Texas Location within the United States
- Coordinates: 31°49′36″N 95°13′10″W
- Country: United States
- State: Texas
- County: Cherokee
- Elevation: 463 ft (141 m)
- Time zone: UTC-6 (Central (CST))
  - Summer (DST): UTC-5 (CDT)
- Area codes: 430 & 903
- GNIS feature ID: 1378206

Delmer is an unincorporated community in Cherokee County, Texas, United States. It is located just under one mile (1.6 km) north of the unincorporated community of Oakland, at the western terminus of Farm to Market Road 2972 (at its junction with Farm to Market Road 347).

== See also ==
- List of unincorporated communities in Texas
