= Murdaugh =

Murdaugh is a surname. Notable people with this surname include:

- Angela Murdaugh (1940–2024), American nurse
- Willie Murdaugh, American basketball player
- Murdaugh family
  - Randolph Murdaugh Sr. (1887–1940), American attorney
  - Randolph Murdaugh Jr. (1915–1998), American attorney
  - Randolph Murdaugh III (1939–2021), American attorney
  - Alex Murdaugh (born 1968)
    - Trial of Alex Murdaugh
    - Murdaugh Murders: A Southern Scandal

== See also ==
- Murtagh (disambiguation)
- Murtaugh (disambiguation)
