= Murdaugh murders =

Murdaugh murders may refer to:

- Murdaugh Murders: A Southern Scandal, a Netflix true crime television series about the Murdaugh family
  - Trial of Alex Murdaugh, for the murder of Paul and Maggie Murdaugh
  - Death of Mallory Beach, a boating accident death involving Paul Murdaugh
  - Murder of Stephen Smith, an unsolved murder alleged to involve the Murdaugh family
  - Death of Gloria Satterfield, a death resulting from an accident at Alex Murdaugh's home

== See also ==
- Murdaugh family
