= Randolph Murdaugh =

Randolph Murdaugh may refer to:

- Randolph Murdaugh Sr. (1887–1940), American attorney and politician from South Carolina
- Randolph Murdaugh Jr. (1915–1998), his son, American attorney in South Carolina
- Randolph Murdaugh III (1939–2021), his son, American attorney in South Carolina

== See also ==
- Murdaugh family#Family tree
