= Randolph Murdaugh Jr. =

American attorney (1915–1998)

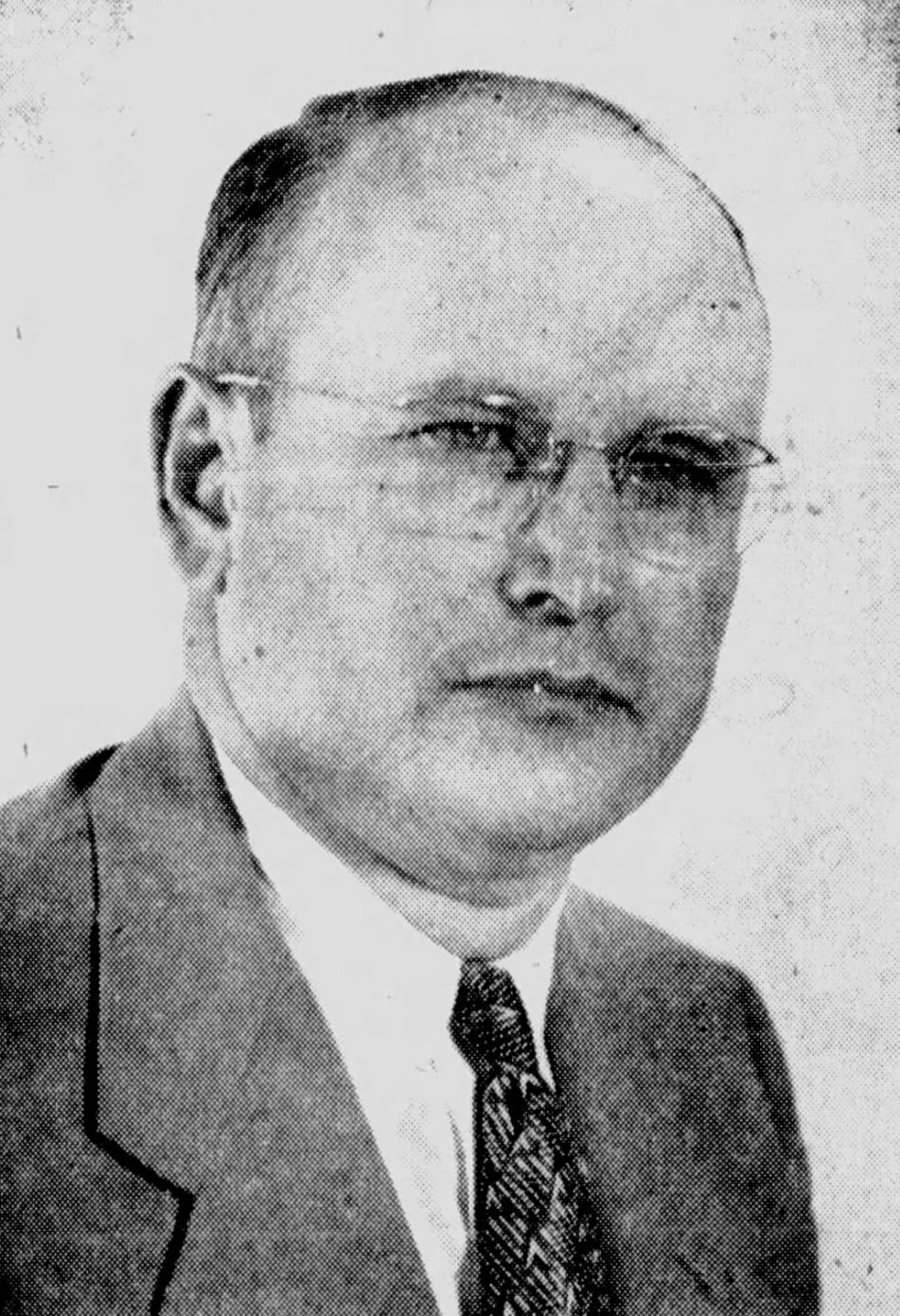
- Murdaugh c. 1952

3rd circuit solicitor for the 14th judicial district of South Carolina
- In office 1940–1986
- Preceded by: Randolph Murdaugh Sr.
- Succeeded by: Randolph Murdaugh III

Personal details
- Born: January 15, 1915 Varnville, South Carolina, US
- Died: February 5, 1998 (aged 83)
- Party: Democratic
- Spouse: Gladys Marvin
- Children: 2, including Randolph Murdaugh III
- Parent: Randolph Murdaugh Sr. (father)
- Education: University of South Carolina
- Known for: 2nd-generation patriarch of Murdaugh family

Randolph "Buster" Murdaugh Jr. (January 15, 1915 – February 5, 1998) was an American attorney who served as the circuit solicitor of South Carolina's 14th judicial district from 1940 until his retirement in 1986. He was the second patriarch of the Murdaugh family from 1940 until the 1980s.

== Early life, education, and early career ==
Murdaugh was born in Varnville, South Carolina on January 19, 1915, to Randolph Murdaugh Sr. and Etta Causey Harvey. Murdaugh had a younger brother, John Glen "Johnny" Murdaugh, two years his junior. In his undergraduate years, Murdaugh played as a lineman on an athletic scholarship for the University of South Carolina football team, where he was bestowed the nickname "Buster" by coach Billy Laval (a nickname also shared by Murdaugh's father when he was at university). On top of his classes, Murdaugh worked as many as three jobs a day, including at the state highway department, state insurance commission, and the South Carolina Senate. At university, he was also elected vice president of the freshman class and pledged Pi Kappa Phi.

On June 24, 1937, Murdaugh married the redheaded Gladys Marvin, a schoolteacher, at her childhood home, where Murdaugh's father served as his best man.

Murdaugh later earned his law degree from the University of South Carolina in 1938, and afterward moved to Hampton, South Carolina to practice at law. He also worked for his father as an assistant solicitor and served as president of the Hampton County Young Democrats. In 1939, as his father's physical condition continued to worsen, Murdaugh acted as solicitor in his place. In his father's stead, Murdaugh successfully convicted Ben Heyward, a black man, for the 1925 murder of white police officer Benjamin Paul Carden; Heyward was executed in the electric chair.

== Circuit solicitor ==
Murdaugh announced his campaign for the Democratic Party's nomination to succeeded his father as Circuit solicitor of South Carolina's 14th judicial district, a week after his death in July 1940. He won the 1940 special election and served until 1986. In his forty-six years in office, Murdaugh ran opposed only twice. During his time as solicitor, Murdaugh would send 19 men to the execution chamber, once commenting, "We're going to do everything we can to stop murders. Yeah, I think the death penalty is a deterrent."

In October 1940, Murdaugh sued the Charleston and Western Carolina Railway for $100,000, claiming that poor maintenance of the rail crossing had contributed to the accident causing his father's death. In his lawsuit, Murdaugh formally hired George Warren as his attorney, who had in fact preceded Murdaugh Sr. as the 14th judicial district solicitor. Although there were rumors that the crash was no accident, with some believing that Murdaugh Sr. intentionally stopped his car on the tracks to commit suicide or that the crash was alcohol-related, Charleston and Western Carolina RW settled the lawsuit for an undisclosed sum. That same month, Buster appeared at the Hampton County Courthouse for the first time since his father's death, handling 15 criminal cases before then-circuit judge Strom Thurmond. The two formed a long-lasting friendship, though Murdaugh would not join Senator Thurmond's switch to the Republican Party in the 1960s, remaining on the state Democratic Party's executive committee for decades.

Murdaugh was known for "his love of chewing tobacco, his courtroom prowess, and his flair for acting out murders before spellbound juries." According to Professor John Blume of Cornell Law School, the South Carolina Supreme Court rebuked Murdaugh several times for improper closing arguments in death penalty cases and for arguing in a rape case that if the defendant was acquitted he would release other accused rapists. In 1955, Murdaugh was charged but exonerated of federal tax fraud charges, with judge Clarence Opper commenting, "However much his method of keeping records and assembling information for his tax returns left much to be desired, carelessness is not synonymous with fraud." In 1956, he was indicted by a federal grand jury for allegedly warning a bootlegger to move a moonshine still into a neighboring county to avoid the revenuers; he was acquitted.

== Retirement, death, and legacy ==
Murdaugh retired in 1986 and was succeeded by his son, Randolph Murdaugh III. He died on February 5, 1998. Among the various tributes made after Murdaugh's death, Carl "Mac" McCleod, sheriff of Beaufort County called him "one of a kind—a true Lowcountry legend." Judge Gerald C. Smoak praised Murdaugh as someone who was both "not afraid of anyone" and "a very accommodating and kind person who was willing to help anybody." Donald Fowler, former chair of the Democratic National Committee and South Carolina Democratic Party, stated, "He was one of the most hardworking, dedicated public servants ever to hold office in this state or anywhere else." Murdaugh's contributions to South Carolina were honored by a house resolution in the South Carolina House of Representatives during the 118th South Carolina legislature.

A portrait of Murdaugh hangs in the Colleton County Courthouse. The painting was temporarily removed for six weeks during the trial of Alex Murdaugh on the order of Judge Clifton Newman.
