= Murtaugh =

Murtaugh may refer to:

- Murtaugh, Idaho, a town in southern Idaho, USA
- Murtaugh Peak, a mountain in Antarctica
- "Murtaugh" (How I Met Your Mother), an episode of How I Met Your Mother

== People with the surname ==
- Danny Murtaugh (1917–1976), American professional baseball player
- John Murtaugh (disambiguation), multiple people
- Tim Murtaugh (born 1943), American professional baseball player and manager

=== Fictional ===
- Roger Murtaugh, a character in the Lethal Weapon film series
- Alexia Murtaugh, a fictional character in the webcomic Schlock Mercenary

== See also ==
- Murtagh
- Murdaugh
