= Clifton Newman =

Circuit court judge in South Carolina

Judge of the South Carolina Circuit Court
- In office May 24, 2000 – December 2023
- Appointed by: South Carolina General Assembly

Personal details
- Born: November 7, 1951 (age 74) Kingstree, South Carolina, U.S.
- Spouse: Patricia Newman
- Children: 4
- Education: Cleveland State University (BA, JD)

Clifton B. Newman (born November 7, 1951) is an American attorney and former at-large judge of the South Carolina Circuit Court. He served as a judge since his election by the state's general assembly in 2000. In 2021, he was reelected to a final fourth term and retired in December 2023. In his role as a circuit court judge he presided over several high-profile trials, including the trials of Michael Slager, Nathaniel Rowland, Mikal Mahdi, and Alex Murdaugh. He currently works for JAMS, a private arbitration association.

== Early life and education ==
Newman was born in Kingstree, South Carolina, on November 7, 1951, to Reverend Dr. Marion L. Newman, Sr. and Alice Singleton Newman. Newman was the first member of his family to be born in a hospital. When Newman was three years old, his mother left his family in Greeleyville, South Carolina, to work in New York as a domestic worker.

In high school, Newman acted as an attorney in a dramatization of Briggs v. Elliott, a precursor to the landmark Brown v. Board of Education. Newman graduated from the then segregated high school, Williamsburg County Training School, as valedictorian in 1969, where he was also student body president. He attended Cleveland State University, where he served as president of the student government. Newman received his Juris Doctor from Cleveland State University College of Law.

== Legal career ==
=== Attorney and assistant solicitor ===
After completing law school, Newman began his legal career in Cleveland, Ohio, by forming a partnership known as Belcher & Newman in 1976. In 1982, Newman returned to South Carolina and opened a private practice with offices in Columbia and Manning. He relocated his office to his hometown of Kingstree shortly thereafter. His law partner in this practice was Ronnie A. Sabb. In July 1983, he was appointed as assistant solicitor for Williamsburg County, where he served for 17 years.

During his time as a private practice attorney and solicitor, Newman handled litigation in hundreds of cases involving personal injury, wrongful death, and medical malpractice. In his role as assistant solicitor, Newman litigated approximately ten murder cases, four of which involved the death penalty.

Newman was the prosecutor in a murder trial during which the defendant, Casey Lewis, attacked his own counsel and a deputy with homemade shanks, while attempting to attack Newman. After Newman successfully argued against a mistrial, Lewis pleaded guilty and was sentenced to 55 years in prison.

=== Circuit court judge ===
In 2000, the South Carolina General Assembly unanimously elected Newman to circuit court judge at-large seat three, as the other candidates withdrew their candidacy. South Carolina is one of two states in America where the legislature directly elects judges. Newman was re-elected to this seat by acclamation three times. His final term ended with his retirement in December 2023 because South Carolina law requires that judges retire in the same calendar year as their 72nd birthday. As a judge, Newman oversaw several high-profile cases.

His first capital case involved Mikal Mahdi, a defendant accused of killing a public safety officer and then burning the victim's body. In this case, the defendant pleaded guilty and Newman retained responsibility for issuing the sentence. In his sentencing, he noted that Mahdi showed no remorse and lacked humanity. Newman issued the death penalty and later remarked this sentencing was difficult for him because he did not agree with the death penalty.

In 2015, he was the judge in the state trial of Michael Slager, the police officer accused in the killing of Walter Scott, which resulted in a mistrial. He made the controversial decision to release Slager on a US$500,000 bond. In this trial, he selected the single Black juror as the foreman.

In 2018, Newman ordered that the South Carolina Statehouse corruption investigation grand jury report be released to the public.

In 2021, Newman presided over the trial of Nathaniel Rowland, the defendant in the state's case related to the murder of Samantha Josephson. Rowland was convicted and Newman issued a life sentence, noting that all of the evidence the state presented pointed to him.

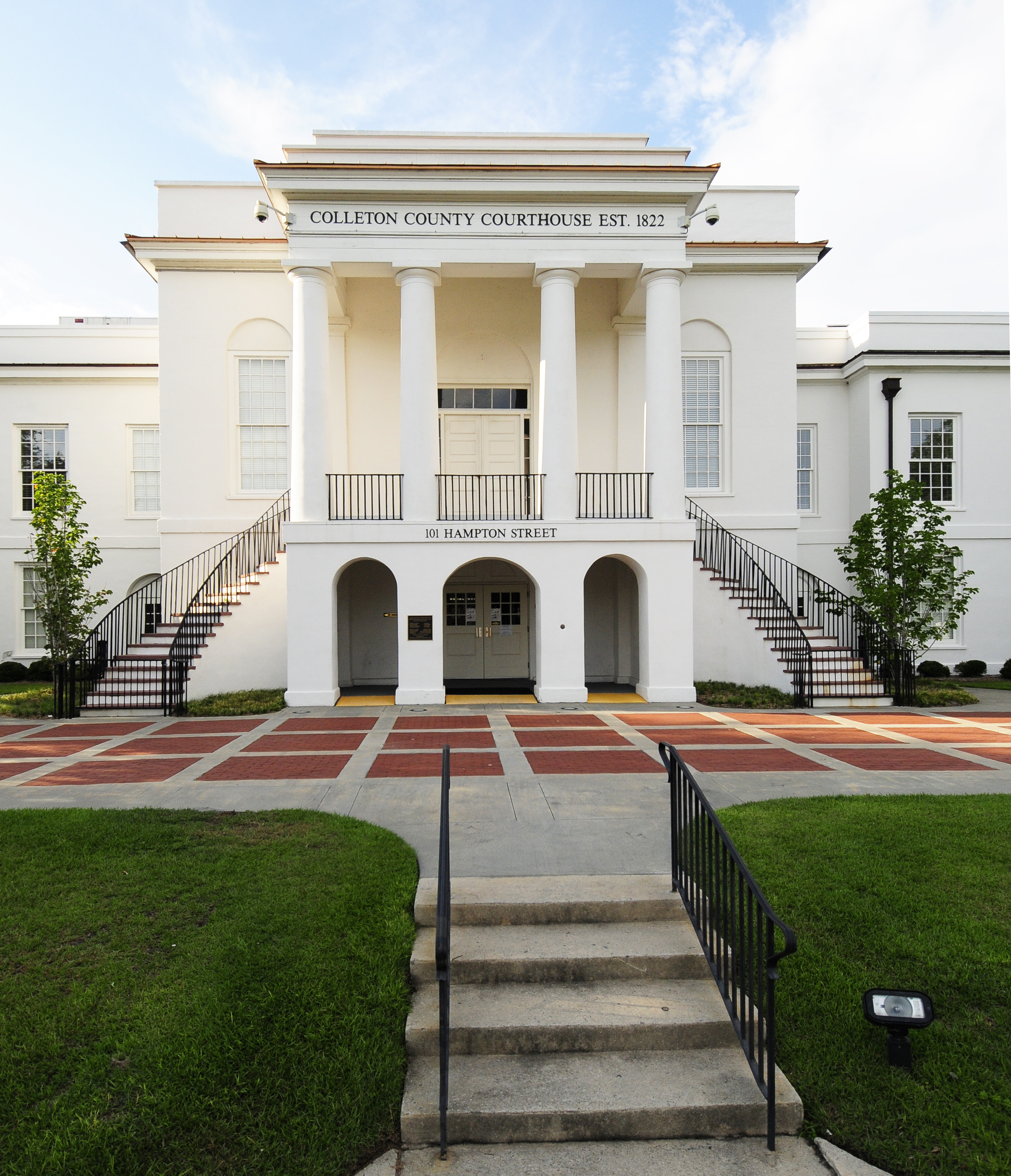
The Trial of Alex Murdaugh was held at the Colleton County Courthouse in Walterboro, South Carolina.

On September 28, 2021, South Carolina Supreme Court Chief Justice Donald W. Beatty issued an order assigning Newman jurisdiction in "criminal investigations concerning Richard Alexander Murdaugh" and "all pending and future criminal investigations concerning the deaths of Margaret Kennedy Branstetter Murdaugh, Paul Terry Murdaugh, Gloria Harriott Satterfield, and Stephen Nicholas Smith, including any criminal charges which may hereafter be brought by law enforcement or the prosecutor assigned to these matters." In the murder trial of Alex Murdaugh, Newman denied a pre-trial joint motion request to seal proceedings, stating that "the public is entitled to know how justice is being administered."

After reading the verdict, Judge Newman denied a defense motion for a directed verdict and mistrial by saying, "The evidence of guilt is overwhelming." He later told the jurors, "The circumstantial evidence, direct evidence — all of the evidence pointed to one conclusion, and that's the conclusion that you all reached." Newman later added that the jury had come to a "proper conclusion as they saw the law and facts." Newman sentenced Murdaugh to two consecutive life sentences without the possibility of parole.

On May 26, 2023, Newman issued a temporary restraining order blocking an abortion ban passed by the state legislature.

As a judge, Newman selected African Americans law clerks helped to facilitate their potential future careers as lawyers and judges.

In April 2024, several months after his mandatory retirement from the circuit court, JAMS, announced that he had joined the private arbitration firm.

=== Business court judge ===
In 2007, South Carolina's Supreme Court created the South Carolina Business Court Pilot Program as a specialized business court docket within the Circuit Court, "to handle complex business, corporate, and commercial matters." The Business Court was made permanent in 2019. Newman was appointed to the Business Court in 2010, and served for over a decade.

Newman has had a significant national presence as a business court judge. He is a past president of the American College of Business Court Judges. He served as co-chair of the American Bar Association's Judges Initiative Committee, and was a co-author of The Business Courts Benchbook. He was also a Business Court Representative to the American Bar Association's Business Law Section.

== Personal life ==
Newman resides in Columbia, South Carolina, with his wife Patricia. Together, they have four children. Newman's daughter Jocelyn Newman is also a circuit court judge. Newman's son Brian DeQuincey Newman was the youngest serving Columbia city councilman until his death by cardiac arrest on January 3, 2023.

Newman is the nephew of civil rights activist I. DeQuincey Newman, the Reverend Omega Newman and Bishop Ernest Newman. He attends a local Methodist Church where he is chairperson of the administrative council. As a hobby, he enjoys restoring houses and has received historical preservation awards for this work.

== Honors and awards ==
Newman has received the following honors and awards, among others;

- Coastal Carolina University awarded Newman the honorary degree Doctor of Public Service, and made him its 2024 commencement speaker (May 2024)
- Honorary doctorate from South Carolina State University (2023)
- Cleveland State University College of Law Hall of Fame (2023)
- Chief Justice Ernest A. Finney, Jr., Trailblazer Award, South Carolina Black Lawyers Association (2023)
- William H. Chandler Lifetime Achievement Award from the Williamsburg HomeTown Chamber (2023)
- Pioneer for Justice for All Award, Williamsburg County Branch, NAACP (2023)
- Clifton B. Newman Champion of Justice Award, Benedict College (2023)
- Matthew J. Perry, Jr. Civility Award, from the Richland County Bar Association (2018)
- North Carolina Association of Black Lawyers Award (2018)
- Jurist of the Year, South Carolina American Board of Trial Advocates (2014)
- Historical preservation awards for his work in restoring historic buildings in Kingstree and Columbia, South Carolina
- Valedictorian and student body president, Williamsburg County Training School in Greeleyville, South Carolina

== Positions and memberships ==
Newman has held the following positions and memberships, among others;

- Chairperson, South Carolina Civil Rules Committee
- President, American College of Business Court Judges
- Co-chair, Judge's Initiative Committee, Business Law Section, American Bar Association
- Business Court Representative to the American Bar Association's Business Law Section
- Adjunct professor, University of South Carolina School of Law
- Member, South Carolina Chief Justice's Commission on the Profession
- Member, South Carolina Commission on Judicial Conduct
- Member, South Carolina Circuit Court Advisory Committee
- Member, South Carolina Judicial Council
- Executive Board of The I. DeQuincey Newman Institute for Peace and Social Change
