= Muirchertach =

Muirchertach (modern spelling: Muircheartach, anglicised as Murtagh) is an Irish language male given name meaning "mariner". The name was sometimes Anglicised as "Mortimer." The Old Norse name Kjartan is derived from this name. Muirchertach was borne by several figures from legend and history, including:

- Muirchertach mac Muiredaig (Mac Ercae), great-grandson of Niall of the Nine Hostages and High King of Ireland
- Muirchertach mac Néill, 10th-century king of Cenél nEógain
- Muircheartach Ua Briain, 12th-century High King of Ireland
- Muirchertach Mac Lochlainn, 12th-century king of Cenél nEógain
- Muirchertach mac Maelruanaidh Mor, obscure king of Magh Luirg

== See also ==
- List of Irish-language given names
