= Murdaugh: Death in the Family =

American true crime drama series

- Promotional poster
- Genre: True crime drama
- Created by: Michael D. Fuller; Erin Lee Carr
- Based on: Murdaugh Murders Podcast by Mandy Matney
- Starring: Jason Clarke; Patricia Arquette; Johnny Berchtold; Will Harrison; Gerald McRaney
- Country of origin: United States
- Original language: English
- No. of seasons: 1
- No. of episodes: 8

Production
- Executive producers: Michael D. Fuller; Erin Lee Carr; Nick Antosca; Alex Hedlund; Mandy Matney; Steven Piet; Patricia Arquette; Jason Clarke; David Moses; Bill Johnson
- Production companies: Eat the Cat; UCP

Original release
- Network: Hulu
- Release: October 15 – November 19, 2025

Murdaugh: Death in the Family is a true crime drama television miniseries created by Michael D. Fuller and Erin Lee Carr for Hulu. It stars Jason Clarke, Patricia Arquette, J. Smith-Cameron, Johnny Berchtold, and Brittany Snow. The series is based on the Murdaugh Murders Podcast by Mandy Matney, who investigated and blogged about the unfolding case of Alex Murdaugh, who was accused of the murders of his wife, Maggie, and their son, Paul, on June 7, 2021; she is played by Brittany Snow in the series. The series depicts the events leading up to the double murder.

Murdaugh: Death in the Family premiered on Hulu on October 15, 2025. The series received generally positive reviews from critics. While critics praised the performances, some were divided on its storytelling and tone.

== Cast and characters ==
=== Main ===
- Jason Clarke as Alex Murdaugh
- Patricia Arquette as Maggie Murdaugh
- Johnny Berchtold as Paul Murdaugh
- Will Harrison as Buster Murdaugh
- Gerald McRaney as Randolph Murdaugh

=== Recurring ===
- Brittany Snow as Mandy Matney
- J. Smith-Cameron as Marian Proctor
- Noah Emmerich as Randy Murdaugh
- Tyner Rushing as Laura Rutland
- Kathleen Wilhoite as Gloria Satterfield
- Tommy Dewey as Mark Tinsley
- Madeline Popovich as Mallory Beach
- Jessi Case as Morgan Doughty
- Jim O'Heir as Dick Harpootlian
- Mark Pellegrino as Curtis Eddie Smith
- Nicholas Cirillo as Connor Cook
- Patch Darragh as John Marvin Murdaugh
- Ryan Paynter as Anthony Cook
- Mina Sundwall as Brooklynn White
- Christian Hopper as Young Alex Murdaugh

=== Co-stars ===
- Carry Hood as Gina Altman
- Ricky Bartlett as Mark Altman
- Candice Rose as Christine Cook
- Ted Huckabee as Marty Cook

== Episodes ==
| No. | Title | Directed by | Written by | Original release date |
|---|---|---|---|---|
| 1 | "Family Tradition" | Steven Piet | Teleplay by : Michael D. Fuller; Story by : Michael D. Fuller & Erin Lee Carr | October 15, 2025 |
| 2 | "One is Missing" | Steven Piet | Michael D. Fuller | October 15, 2025 |
| 3 | "Kokomo" | Ingrid Jungermann | Anna Fishko | October 15, 2025 |
| 4 | "Controlled Burn" | Jennifer Lynch | David Gabriel & Tika Peterson | October 22, 2025 |
| 5 | "The Prince" | Erin Lee Carr | Alana B. Lytle | October 29, 2025 |
| 6 | "June 7th" | Kat Candler | Michael D. Fuller & Anna Fishko | November 5, 2025 |
| 7 | "On the Road You Take to Avoid it" | Kat Candler | Bashir Gavriel | November 12, 2025 |
| 8 | "The Man in the Glass" | Steven Piet | Michael D. Fuller & Gabrielle Costa | November 19, 2025 |

== Production ==
=== Development ===
In November 2022, it was announced a series revolving around the Murdaugh murders was in development at Hulu, with Universal Content Productions producing, Michael D. Fuller and Erin Lee Carr serving as creators and executive producers alongside Nick Antosca and Alex Hedlund for Eat the Cat, David Moses and Bill Johnson. Steven Piet executive produced and directed episodes 101, 102, and 108.

=== Casting ===
In September 2024, Patricia Arquette joined the cast. In December 2024, Jason Clarke joined the cast. Arquette and Clarke also served as executive producers of the series. In March 2025, J. Smith-Cameron, Johnny Berchtold and Will Harrison joined the cast in series regular and recurring capacity respectively. In April 2025, Brittany Snow, Noah Emmerich, Kathleen Wilhoite, Tommy Dewey, Madeline Popovich, Jessi Case, Jim O'Heir, Mark Pellegrino, Nicholas Cirillo, Patch Darragh, Ryan Paynter, Gerald McRaney and Mina Sundwall joined the cast in series regular and recurring capacities, respectively. In May 2025, Tyner Rushing joined the cast in recurring capacity.

=== Filming ===
Principal photography commenced by March 2025 in Atlanta and surrounding areas.

== Release ==
The trailer of Murdaugh: Death in the Family was released on September 11, 2025. The series premiered on Hulu on October 15, with the first three episodes and the rest debuting on a weekly basis until the series finale on November 19. Internationally, the series was made available to stream on Disney+.

== Reception ==
=== Viewership ===
Murdaugh: Death in the Family entered Hulu's "Top 15 Today" list—a daily ranking of the platform's most-watched titles—following its premiere on October 15. TVision, which tracks viewer attention, reach, and engagement across more than 1,000 connected TV applications, reported the series among the most-streamed programs in the United States, ranking it within the top five streaming programs for part of October 2025. The series was the fifth most-streamed program in the United States between October 13 and 26 and remained among the fifteenth most-streamed programs through the week ending November 9, according to TVision. Murdaugh: Death in the Family remained on Hulu's "Top 15 Today" list from its debut on October 15 through December 4.

=== Critical response ===
The review aggregator website Rotten Tomatoes reported a 69% approval rating based on 26 critic reviews. Metacritic, which uses a weighted average, gave a score of 63 out of 100 based on 15 critics, indicating "generally favorable."

Variety's Aramide Tinubu called Murdaugh: Death in the Family an "engaging portrait of greed, cruelty and arrogance," complimenting the series for capturing "what is so compelling about this particular family and why, ultimately, they self-immolated." Tinubu highlighted the depiction of the Murdaughs' dysfunction, privilege, and criminal activity, praising Patricia Arquette's portrayal of Maggie Murdaugh, a woman "trapped in a life she thought she wanted." She appreciated the series for immersing viewers in the Murdaugh "ecosystem" and depicting the consequences of the family's abuse of wealth and influence. Tinubu further described the series as a "profoundly compelling character study" of a man whose long-standing authority collapses. Angie Han of The Hollywood Reporter described Murdaugh: Death in the Family as "thoughtful without being terribly insightful," noting that the series largely remains within familiar territory over its eight episodes. She praised the performances of Jason Clarke, Patricia Arquette, and Johnny Berchtold, highlighting the series' ability to ground the family's actions in "recognizable humanity" while avoiding sensationalism. Han criticized its narrow focus on the Murdaughs, observing that non-Murdaugh victims and those affected by the family's misconduct are largely reduced to "symbols." She added that the series underscores the limits of understanding the psychology behind tragic events, emphasizing the "violent external reality of the shootings rather than dwell[ing] on the twisted internal logic underlying them."
