= 1920 United States Senate election in South Carolina =

1920 South Carolina Democratic Senate primary runoff
- September 14, 1920
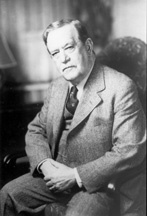

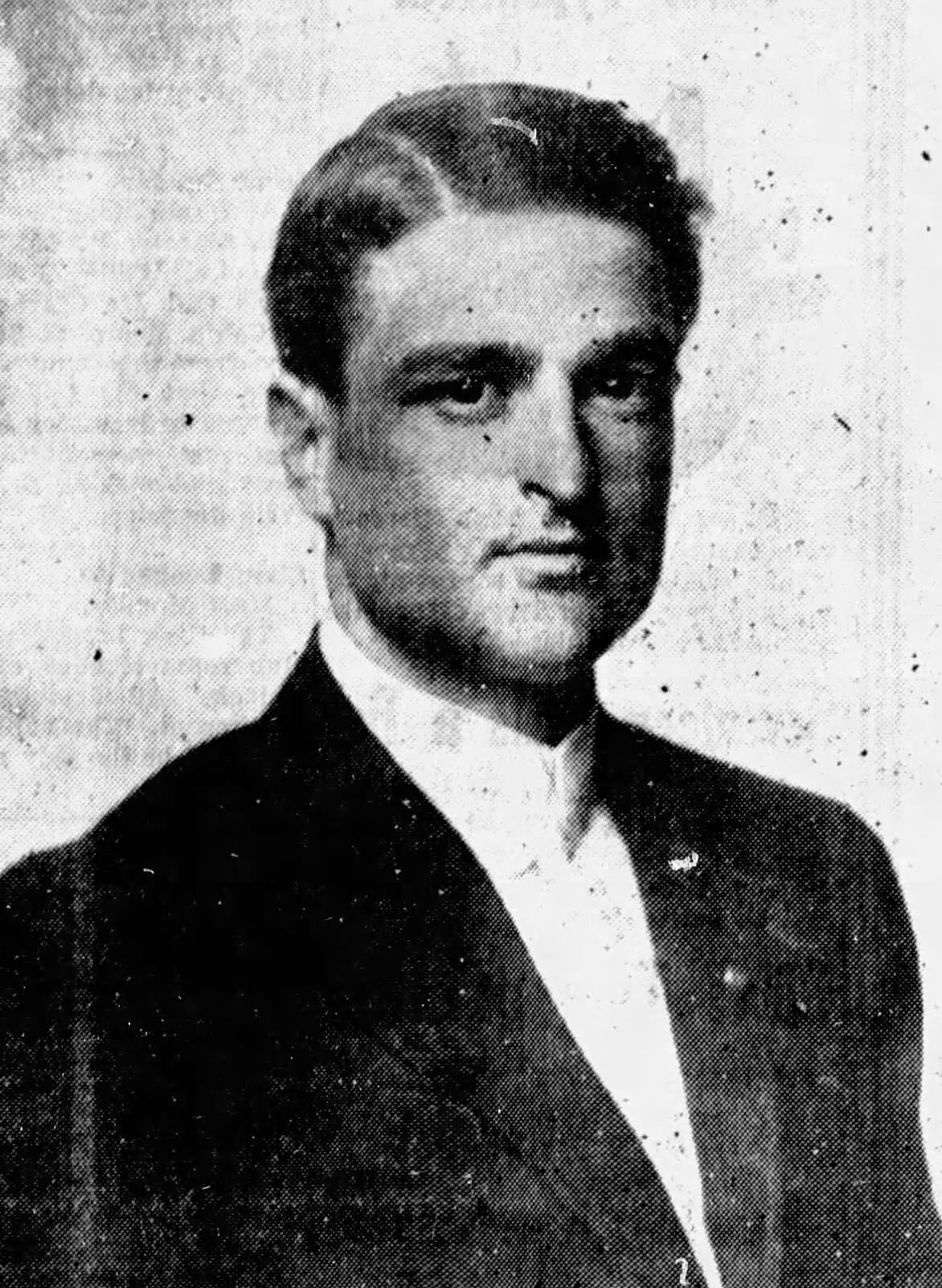
Nominee	Ellison D. Smith	George Warren
Party	Democratic	Democratic
Popular vote	65,880	42,735
Percentage	60.65%	39.35%
- Smith: 30–40% 40–50% 50–60% 60–70% 70–80% 80–90% Warren: 30–40% 40–50% 50–60% 60–70% 70–80% 80–90% Pollock: 50–60% Irby: 30–40%
U.S. senator before election
Ellison D. Smith
Democratic
Elected U.S. Senator
Ellison D. Smith
Democratic

The 1920 South Carolina United States Senate election was held on November 2, 1920, to select the U.S. Senator from the state of South Carolina. Incumbent Democratic Senator Ellison D. Smith won the Democratic primary and was unopposed in the general election to win another six-year term.

== Democratic primary ==
=== Candidates ===
- W.C. Irby
- William P. Pollock, former interim U.S. Senator and State Representative from Cheraw
- Ellison D. Smith, incumbent Senator since 1909
- George Warren, circuit solicitor and former State Representative from Hampton

Smith was the leader in the first primary election on August 31 and won the runoff election two weeks later on September 14. There was no opposition to the Democratic candidate in the general election so Smith was elected to another six-year term in the Senate.

=== Results ===
Democratic Primary
Candidate	Votes	%
Ellison D. Smith	57,423	48.7
George Warren	36,317	30.8
William P. Pollock	15,678	13.3
W.C. Irby	8,454	7.2

=== Runoff ===
Democratic Primary Runoff
Candidate	Votes	%	±%
Ellison D. Smith	65,880	60.7	+12.0
George Warren	42,735	39.3	+8.5

== General election results ==
South Carolina U.S. Senate Election, 1920
Party	Candidate	Votes	%	±%
Democratic	Ellison D. Smith (incumbent)	64,388	100.00%	+0.27%
No party	Write-Ins	1	0.00%	−0.27%
Majority		64,387	100.00%	+0.54%
Turnout		64,389		
Democratic hold				

65+% won by Smith

== See also ==
- List of United States senators from South Carolina
- 1920 United States Senate elections
- 1920 United States House of Representatives elections in South Carolina
- 1920 South Carolina gubernatorial election
