= Murtagh =

Murtagh (Irish: Ó Muircheartaigh) is an Irish surname. Murtagh may also refer to:

== People ==
- Murtagh (name)

== Fictional characters ==
- Murtagh, a character in The Inheritance Cycle
  - Murtagh, a 2023 novel by Christopher Paolini

== See also ==
- Murtaugh (disambiguation)
- Murtha
- Kjartan, a related Nordic name
