= Murtha =

Murtha is a surname. Notable people with the surname include:

- Andrew Murtha (born 1965), Australian speed skater
- John Murtha (1932–2010), member of the United States Congress
- John Garvan Murtha (born 1941), United States federal judge
- John Murtha (Wisconsin politician) (born 1951), Wisconsin state assemblyman
- Lydon Murtha (born 1985), American football player
- William H. Murtha (1841–1891), merchant and New York politician
- Tish Murtha (1956–2013), documentary photographer

== See also ==
- Johnstown–Cambria County Airport, an airport named after the congressman
- USS John P. Murtha (LPD-26), a US Navy ship named after the congressman
- Murtagh
