= Kjartan =

- Pronunciation: Icelandic: [ˈcʰar̥tan]; Faroese pronunciation: [ˈtʃʰaɻ̊ʈan]
- Gender: Male

Origin
- Origin: Old Irish name Muirchertach
- Region of origin: Iceland and Norway

Kjartan (Icelandic: [ˈcʰar̥tan]; Faroese: [ˈtʃʰaɻ̊ʈan]; Norwegian: [çɑːɻtan]) is a masculine given name found in the Nordic countries, most prominently in Iceland and Norway. The Old Norse name Kjartan was a shortening of Mýrkjartan, from Old Irish: Muirchertach, the name of an Irish king whose daughter Melkorka (Old Irish Mael Curcaigh, "servant of Curcach") was brought to Iceland as a slave. The Irish name Muirchertach, meaning "mariner", is modernised to Muircheartach, anglicised as Murtagh.

Kjartan may refer to:

- Kjartan Finnbogason (born 1986), Icelandic international football player
- Kjartan Fløgstad (born 1944), Norwegian author
- Kjartan Gunnarsson (born 1951), Icelandic politician and lawyer
- Kjartan Haugen (born 1975), Norwegian cross-country skier and Paralympic gold medallist
- Kjartan Kristiansen (born 1963), Norwegian guitarist and backing vocalist in band DumDum Boys
- Kjartan Lauritzen (born 1995), Norwegian rapper
- Kjartan Ólafsson (disambiguation), various people
- Kjartan Poskitt (born 1956), English author and television presenter
- Kjartan Salvesen (born 1976), Norwegian pop singer
- Kjartan Sturluson (born 1975), Icelandic international football goalkeeper
- Kjartan Sveinsson (born 1978), Icelandic keyboardist of the band Sigur Rós
- Kjartan the Cruel, a fictional character in The Last Kingdom television series and The Saxon Stories books
