= Death of Mallory Beach =

2019 boat crash in Beaufort, South Carolina

- Undated self-portrait of Mallory Beach
- Date: February 24, 2019; 7 years ago
- Location: Beaufort, South Carolina, U.S.
- Type: Boat crash
- Deaths: Mallory Beach
- Injuries: Connor Cook; Morgan Doughty; Anthony Cook; Miley Altman
- Accused: Paul Murdaugh
- Charges: Boating under the influence
- Verdict: Charges dropped following the death of Paul Murdaugh

At approximately 2:17 a.m. on Sunday, February 24, 2019, Paul Terry Murdaugh crashed his family boat into the Archers Creek Bridge in Beaufort, South Carolina. On board the boat at the time of the accident were Mallory Beach and several other teenagers. Beach was killed in the accident, and Murdaugh was charged with three felony counts of boating under the influence, including causing the death of Mallory Beach, and seriously injuring two other passengers.

Paul was murdered along with his mother in 2021. On March 3, 2023, Paul's father Alex Murdaugh was found guilty on four counts during the first trial. On the 13th of May of 2026, Alex Murdaugh's murder conviction was overturned.

== Mallory Beach ==
Mallory Madison Beach was born to Phillip Harley and Renee Searson Beach on April 18, 1999, in Walterboro, South Carolina. She was a Wade Hampton High School graduate. At the time of her death, the 19-year-old was attending college and working at a clothing store.

== Accident ==
Paul Murdaugh purchased alcohol in the hours before the accident at a convenience store in Ridgeland, South Carolina using his brother's ID. Three couples, including Beach and her boyfriend, and Murdaugh and his girlfriend Morgan Doughty, met at Murdaugh's grandfather's Chechesee River house and boarded a center console boat to travel to an oyster roast.

At 1 a.m., during the return trip, they stopped at a dockside bar in Beaufort where Murdaugh and another passenger, Connor Cook, drank shots. Murdaugh began behaving erratically, and while other passengers asked him to allow someone else to drive the boat, he refused. Murdaugh reportedly shoved, spat on, and slapped his then-girlfriend just prior to the crash. At 2:17 a.m. the boat hit a piling on the bridge to Parris Island.

== Following the accident ==
The passengers were transported to a nearby hospital, except for Beach, who could not be found after the crash, and Beach's boyfriend, Anthony Cook, who insisted on staying behind to wait for news about Beach. Investigators and volunteers spent eight days searching for Beach, according to CBS News. On March 3, 2019, two volunteers found her body about five miles down the river from the scene of the crash.

Several of the teens were injured and required surgery. Paul Murdaugh was uncooperative with the medical staff. Several hours after the crash, his blood alcohol content was .24, three times the legal limit. Paul claimed that one of the other teens, Connor Cook, had been driving the boat; however, evidence from his injuries proved that Connor Cook was a passenger, and he was not charged.

Paul Murdaugh was charged with three felony counts on April 18, 2019, including boating under the influence, causing the death of Mallory Beach and seriously injuring two other passengers. He pleaded not guilty and was released on bond. On June 7, 2021, Paul and his mother Maggie were murdered, and the charges against the now-deceased Paul were dropped. At the time, his father Alex Murdaugh theorized that Paul and Maggie had been killed in retaliation for the boat accident. On July 15, 2022, Alex Murdaugh was charged with their homicides and was later found guilty on March 2, 2023. The guilty verdict was subsequently overturned, and a new trial is pending.

== Lawsuits and murders ==
Beach's mother, Renee Beach, filed a lawsuit against several members of the Murdaugh family: Paul's brother, Buster Murdaugh, who allegedly loaned the underage Paul his driver's license so that he could obtain alcohol, and Paul's mother Maggie, who allegedly allowed Paul to use the boat while drinking. Alex Murdaugh and the store where the underage teens bought the alcohol were also named in the lawsuit, which was settled in January 2023. Suits were also filed against other Murdaugh family members, the hosts of the oyster roast, the owner of the bar where Murdaugh drank shots after the oyster roast, and the owner of the convenience store that sold Murdaugh alcohol. In July 2023, the Beach family reached a $15 million settlement with Parker’s Corporation, owners of the convenience store which had sold alcohol to Paul Murdaugh. The Beaches were represented by Mark Tinsley, who filed a motion to compel Alex Murdaugh to disclose his finances after the latter claimed that he was broke.

Paul and Maggie were murdered on June 7, 2021, three days before the scheduled June 10 hearing on the motion. Tinsley said "The fuse was lit", as the disclosure would reveal Alex Murdaugh's corporate fraud had run for years. Alex Murdaugh was arrested in July 2022 after a Colleton County grand jury issued an indictment charging him with two counts of murder and two counts of possession of a weapon during the commission of a violent crime in the deaths of Maggie and Paul. The indictment stated that Alex shot his wife with a rifle and his son with a shotgun. During the first trial of Alex Murdaugh, he was found guilty on all four counts related to the murders in March 2023, and sentenced to two life sentences. Murdaugh appealed the conviction because the jury was tampered with by court clerk Becky Hill. It was reviewed by the state Supreme Court who unanimously agree with Murdaugh and threw the murder conviction out: Becky Hill had "placed her fingers on the scales of justice", according to the justices. Prosecutors responded they would look into retrying the case.

== Media portrayals ==
- Murdaugh Murders Podcast (2021; Liz Farrell and Mandy Matney)
- Murdaugh Murders: A Southern Scandal (2023; Netflix)
- Murdaugh: Death in the Family (2025; Hulu)

== See also ==
- Murdaugh family – South Carolina family
- Trial of Alex Murdaugh – 2023 murder trial in South Carolina, US
