= Tyner Rushing =

American actress

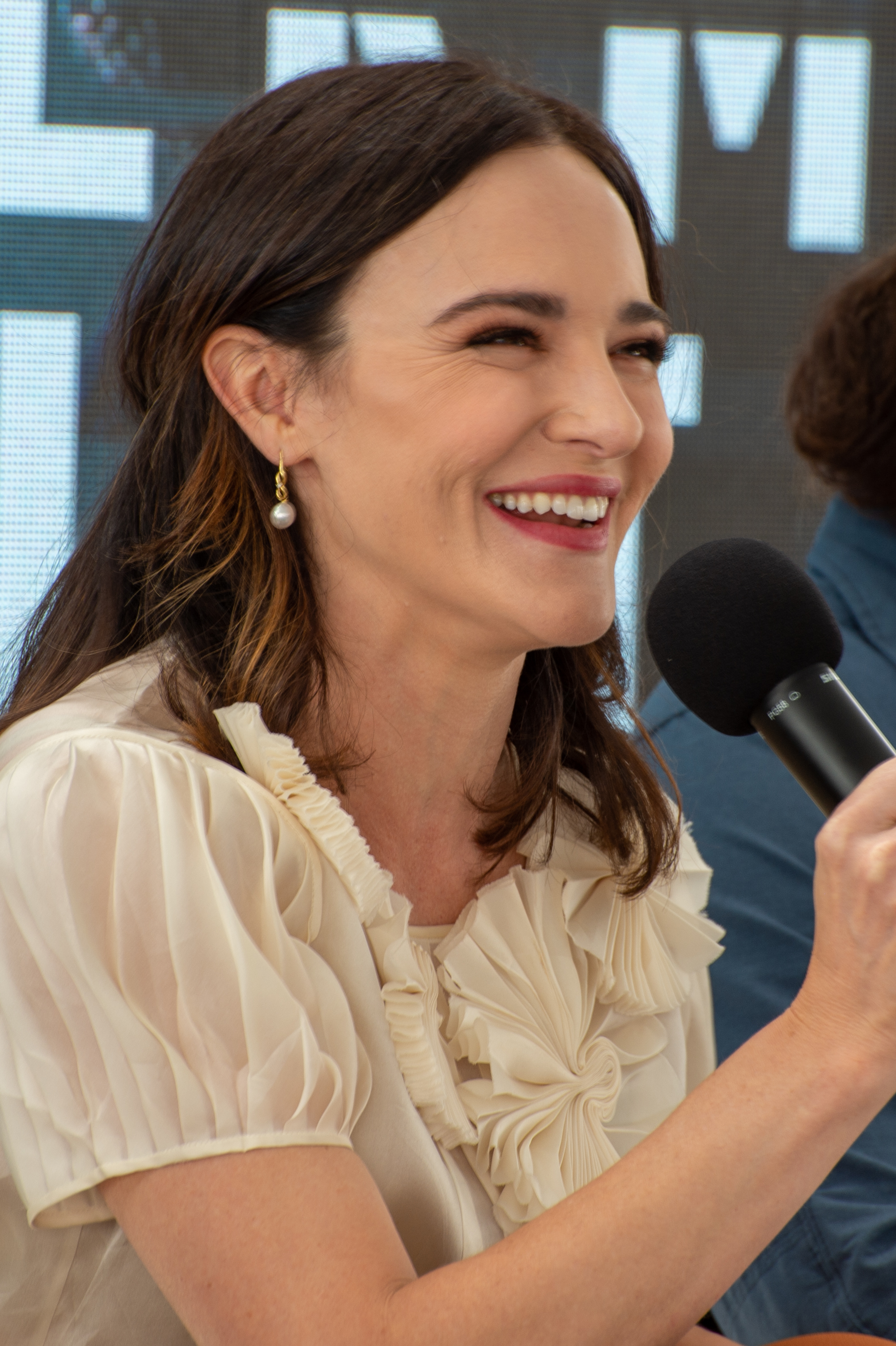
Rushing speaking on a panel for The Terminal List in 2022

Tyner Rushing is an American actress known for her role portraying Emma Smith in FX on Hulu's Under the Banner of Heaven. Other notable roles include Liz Riley in The Terminal List and Virginia Creel in Stranger Things. Rushing joined the main cast of For All Mankind in its fourth season as the character Samantha Massey, a blue-collar space worker and aspiring astronaut. In 2025, she joined the cast of the HBO supernatural horror television series It: Welcome to Derry, Hulu’s Murdaugh: Death in the Family and Amazon Prime Video's It's Not Like That.

== Early life and education ==
Tyner Rushing was born to Ralph Rushing and Patti Tyner Rushing and grew up in Semmes, Alabama on a farm and plant nursery. She got her start in the performing arts world as a singer and dancer in various musicals and operas, and attended Birmingham–Southern College as a vocal performance major. Rushing was one of five winners of the Dorsey Whittington Concerto/Aria Competition. She performed with the Red Mountain Chamber Orchestra as part of her prize and sang an aria (as a mezzo-soprano) from ’'Orfeo ed Euridice.’'

== Personal life ==
Rushing is queer. She lives in Los Angeles.

== Filmography ==
=== Television ===
Year	Title	Role	Notes
2020	Lovecraft Country	Barb	
2021	Creepshow	June Aurora	
2021	Under the Banner of Heaven	Emma Smith	5 episodes
2021	The Terminal List	Liz Riley	5 episodes
2022	Echoes	Maria McCleary	5 episodes
2022	Stranger Things	Virginia Creel	2 episodes
2023	The Last Thing He Told Me	Max Parnes	
2023–2024	For All Mankind	Samantha Massey	10 episodes
2025	Murdaugh: Death in the Family	Detective Laura Rutland	3 episodes
2025–present	It: Welcome to Derry	Young Ingrid Kersh	1 episode
2026	It's Not Like That	Jenny Jeffries	
