= Trials of Alex Murdaugh =

2023 murder trial in South Carolina, US

State v. Murdaugh
- Court: South Carolina Fourteenth Circuit
- Full case name: The State of South Carolina v. Richard Alexander Murdaugh
- Started: January 25, 2023
- Decided: March 2, 2023; 3 years ago
- Verdict: Guilty on all counts (overturned)
- Charge: Murder (2 counts); Possession of a weapon during the commission of a violent crime (2 counts)

Case history
- Appealed to: South Carolina Supreme Court
- Subsequent action: Murdaugh was sentenced to two consecutive life sentences without the possibility of parole. The verdict was later overturned.

Court membership
- Judge sitting: Clifton Newman

State of South Carolina v. Richard Alexander Murdaugh was the trial of former American lawyer Alex Murdaugh for the murders of his wife, Maggie, and their 22-year-old son, Paul, on June 7, 2021. The trial in the fourteenth circuit of the South Carolina Circuit Court began on January 25, 2023, and ended on March 2 with a guilty verdict on all four counts. Murdaugh was sentenced to two consecutive life sentences without the possibility of parole. On May 13, 2026, the State Supreme Court overturned the convictions against Murdaugh, citing jury interference by court clerk Rebecca Hill. Prosecutors are retrying the case.

Local media called the trial South Carolina's "trial of the century" and "one of the most high-profile and sensational cases in South Carolina legal history".

== Background ==
Alex Murdaugh is a member of the Murdaugh family, a family of attorneys prominent in the South Carolina Lowcountry. At the time of his death, Alex's younger son Paul had been under indictment in the death of Mallory Beach, a passenger on a power boat Paul had allegedly driven into a bridge while drunk.

=== Killings ===
Alex called his wife Maggie Murdaugh (52) on June 7, 2021, and asked her to meet with him at the Murdaugh family hunting lodge in Islandton, reportedly so that the two of them could travel together to see Alex's father, Randolph Murdaugh III, who was terminally ill. Maggie texted a friend, saying her husband sounded "fishy" and was "up to something." After parking her car at the house, Maggie walked to the dog kennels, where she found her son, Paul (22). Alex called police from his cellphone at 10:06 p.m., saying he had discovered the bodies of Maggie and Paul near the dog kennels. Each had been shot multiple times in the head, wrists and chest, with different guns.

Murdaugh claimed that at the time of the killings he had been with his mother, who has dementia; however, cellphone data, including video containing Alex's voice, placed him at the scene before the murders.

=== Investigation ===
In October 2021, it was revealed that South Carolina Law Enforcement Division (SLED) had regarded Alex as a person of interest in the homicides since the start of the investigation. The investigation was heavily criticized by Murdaugh's defense attorney, Dick Harpootlian, during trial; the crime scene was spoiled by rain, police reportedly failed to collect various evidence, and family members and friends were allowed to walk through the scene.

=== Arrest ===
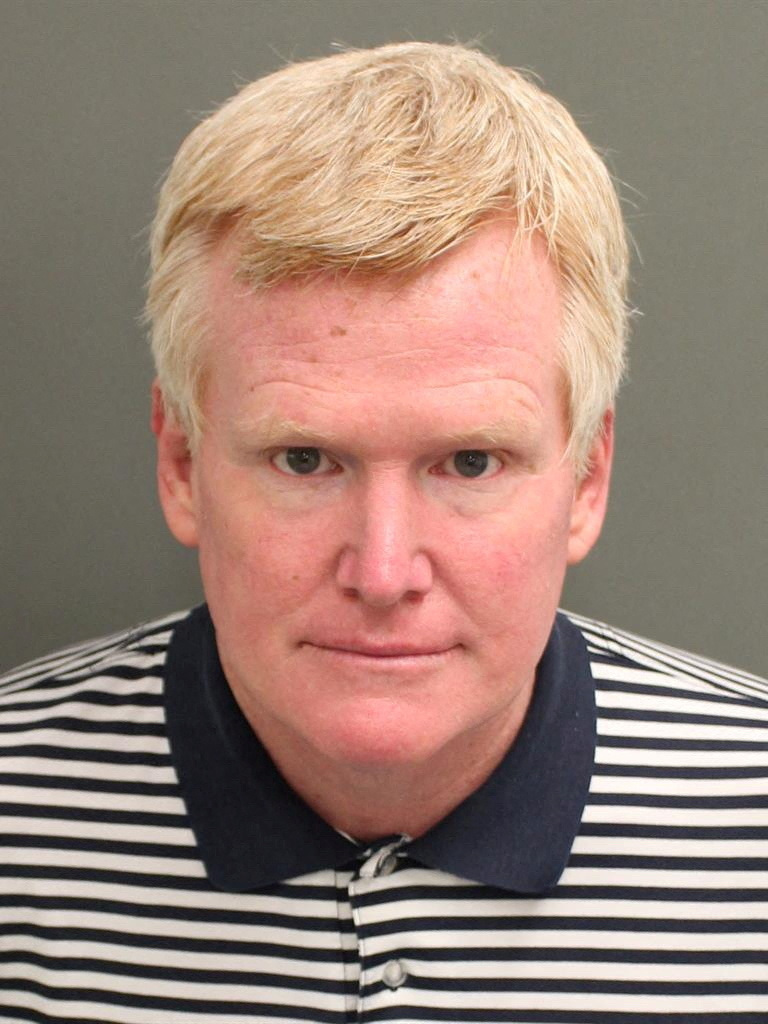
Murdaugh in 2021 following his arrest for financial crimes

Murdaugh was indicted in July 2022 by a Colleton County grand jury on two counts of murder and two counts of possession of a weapon during the commission of a violent crime in the deaths of Maggie and Paul. The indictment stated that Alex shot his wife with a rifle and his son with a shotgun. Murdaugh pleaded not guilty and was denied bond. (Note: Murdaugh had been incarcerated since October 2021 for financial charges.) Prosecutors said they would seek life imprisonment without the possibility of parole, not the death penalty.

== Trial ==
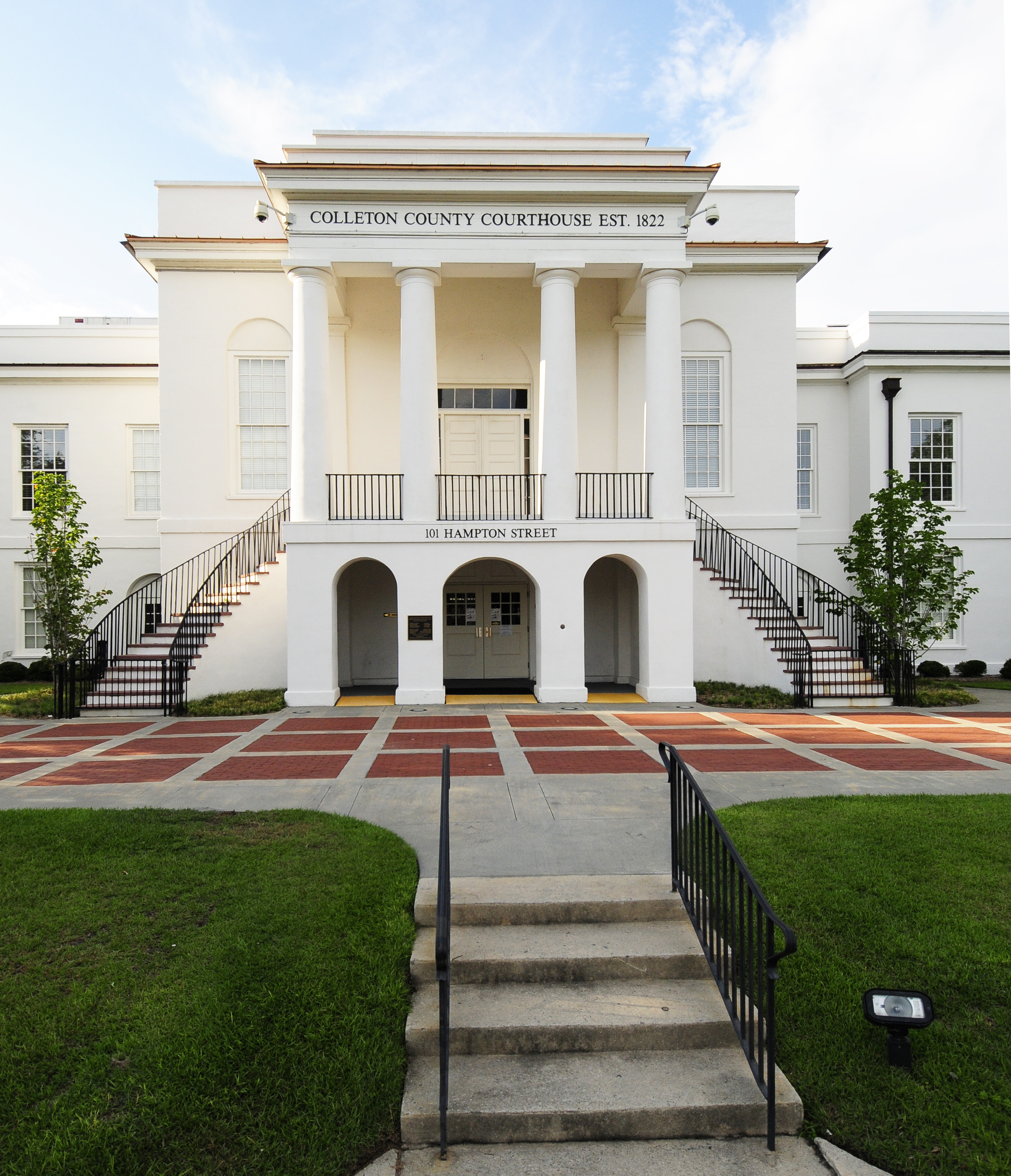
The trial was held at the Colleton County Courthouse in Walterboro, South Carolina.

Murdaugh's trial began January 25, 2023, at the Colleton County Courthouse in Walterboro, with instructions from the judge and opening statements from the prosecution and defense.

Creighton Waters, chief prosecutor for the grand jury, led the prosecuting team against Murdaugh. John Meadors, a Columbia attorney with extensive experience in murder trials, was hired by the Attorney General of South Carolina as part of the prosecuting team. Murdaugh was represented by Dick Harpootlian and Jim Griffin. The cases were overseen by Judge Clifton Newman.

Defense counsel argued that the prosecution should be prohibited from asking questions related to Murdaugh's financial crimes but the judge overruled their objections and announced he would make a formal ruling on the matter on Thursday, February 2, 2023. The judge dismissed the jury early on Thursday, February 2, in order for the prosecution to present two witnesses who testified in chambers about Murdaugh's financial crimes. The judge said that he needed to hear more testimony privately before ruling whether these witnesses would be allowed to testify before the jury.

On February 6, after several days of hearing arguments without the jury present, Judge Newman ruled that the testimony related to Murdaugh's alleged financial crimes was admissible: He said that jurors were entitled to consider whether Murdaugh's financial situation was a motive for the killings. Newman also said that defense counsel had opened the door to testimony about the alleged financial crimes when they asked a witness to speculate about a possible motive for Murdaugh to commit the murders. A bomb threat on February 8 forced the court to recess for several hours.

On February 13, Judge Newman announced that two jurors had been dismissed and replaced with alternate jurors because they had tested positive for COVID-19. On February 24, a new charge was filed against Murdaugh for passing contraband in the courtroom. At the defense's request, the jury visited the murder scene.

=== Testimony ===
The first prosecution witnesses included first responders on the scene after Murdaugh's 911 call. The prosecution asked the judge to compel a representative of Snapchat to testify about a video posted by Paul Murdaugh minutes before his death. The prosecution brought South Carolina Law Enforcement Division (SLED) witnesses to testify about firearms and ballistics, and an interview conducted with Murdaugh in a car on June 21, 2021, during which Murdaugh said of his son, "It's just so bad. I did him so bad," which Waters emphasized for the jury. The defense team disputed whether the recording said "I" or "they". The prosecution brought an expert witness to testify about data collected by Maggie's phone. The prosecution brought two close friends of Paul Murdaugh to testify about their interactions with the Murdaugh family and their communications with Paul moments before his death. A witness said he heard Alex's voice in a video taken by Paul minutes before the time the prosecution believes the murders took place.

Prosecutors called former colleagues and clients of Murdaugh to testify about the defendant's financial situation just before the murders occurred and argued that the motive was stress caused by the impending discovery of Murdaugh's financial crimes. They also called a chief executive officer of a local bank to testify about the bank's discovery of theft by Murdaugh.

Prosecutors called expert witnesses, including a criminologist and pathologist. They called a SLED agent to testify about a timeline for the events of June 7, aggregating all of the data collected from various sources, including the cell-phones of the victims and the defendant, car telemetry data, and cell-phone tower pings. Prosecutors rested their case on February 17.

Defense counsel called their first witness immediately after the prosecution rested their case. They called the Colleton County coroner, who testified that he had only estimated the victims' body temperatures and that the reported time of death was an estimate.

On February 21, the defense called the defendant's surviving son, Buster, to the stand. The defense called several expert witnesses, including a crime-scene engineer, who re-created the crime scene and argued that the presumed height of the shooter was not consistent with the defendant's height. Another expert witness testified that he believed the crime scene was not handled properly by first responders.

On February 23, Murdaugh took the stand to testify. He denied shooting his wife and son. Murdaugh confirmed that he could be heard in a video taken by his son at 8:44 p.m. at the kennels. Murdaugh admitted repeatedly lying to law officers about whether he had been at the kennels at the night of the killings (before he reported finding the bodies there later that night) and attributed the lies to "paranoid thinking" from his addiction to opioids. He also admitted stealing from legal clients and his firm and also admitted asking a relative to shoot him. The prosecution's cross-examination began the same day. Murdaugh finished his testimony the next day, and Judge Newman dismissed the jury immediately after it concluded.

The defense called a pathologist, who testified that the state's pathologist had not correctly determined the entrance and exit wounds on Paul's body. The defense also called Tim Palmbach, an expert in bloodstain spatter analysis. Palmbach has also testified in such high-profile cases as the trial of Michael Peterson. Palmbach testified that he believed that a shooter would have been covered in blood and gunshot residue; he also stated that he believed that the evidence was consistent with two shooters being present. The last witness the defense called was the defendant's brother, John Marvin Murdaugh. On February 27, the defense rested their case and moved for a directed verdict, which was subsequently denied by Judge Newman.

After the defense rested their case, the prosecution indicated they would reply to the defense's case. On February 28, the prosecution began their reply case by calling witnesses. Four of the witnesses they called had testified earlier. A police chief who had associated with Murdaugh was also called to the stand. The final witness was a crime-scene expert called previously; South Carolina Attorney General Alan Wilson conducted the direct examination. The prosecution rested their reply case on February 28.

=== Closing arguments, verdict, and sentencing ===
Closing arguments began on March 1. On March 2, Judge Newman announced that he had been notified that a juror had discussed the evidence presented. The juror was dismissed for improper conduct and an alternate replaced her. Attorney Creighton Waters delivered the state's closing statement, and attorney Jim Griffin delivered the defense's closing statement. Attorney John Meadors delivered the state's reply and final argument. The jury was charged and began deliberating on March 2.

On March 2, 2023, after less than three hours of deliberation, the jury found Murdaugh guilty of two counts of murder and two counts of possession of a weapon during a violent crime. Because of the intense public interest in the case, the verdict was transmitted live across the United States on major broadcast and cable news networks. After the verdict was read, Judge Newman denied a motion from the defense for a mistrial by saying, "The evidence of guilt is overwhelming." He told the jurors, "The circumstantial evidence, direct evidence—all of the evidence pointed to one conclusion, and that's the conclusion that you all reached." Newman later added that the jury had come to a "proper conclusion as they saw the law and facts". Murdaugh was sentenced to two consecutive life sentences without the possibility of parole on March 3, 2023, at 10:08 a.m. EST. After his sentencing, Murdaugh was taken to the Kirkland Correctional Institution, in northwestern Columbia, South Carolina, for about 45 days during which he was evaluated to determine which maximum-security prison he would be sent to.

== Aftermath and further sentences ==
After the verdict, prosecutors held a press conference. The defense took questions from media the day after sentencing and said that they would appeal the verdict. In an interview a few days after the sentencing, Murdaugh's older brother, Randy, said he believed that his brother had not told the whole truth about what he knew about the killings. On March 9, Murdaugh's attorneys filed a notice of appeal with the South Carolina Court of Appeals. In a sale conducted by Georgia-based Liberty Auction on March 23, items were sold from Murdaugh's property, including antlers, turtle-shell lamps and furniture.

On May 24, the US Attorney's Office, District of South Carolina announced that a federal grand jury returned an indictment of 22 counts for money laundering, wire fraud, bank fraud, and conspiracy to commit wire fraud and bank fraud. On November 17, 2023, Murdaugh pleaded guilty to all 22 of the state's charges in the indictment. On November 29, 2023, he was sentenced to 27 years in prison in relation to the state's criminal indictments. In addition to the state's indictments, he was also indicted by the Federal Government. On April 1, 2024, Murdaugh was sentenced in Federal court to 40 years in federal prison for his financial fraud crimes, to run concurrently with the previous sentences (for murder and state financial crimes), and to pay reparations of $8.7 million to his victims, including the family of his former housekeeper Gloria Satterfield, after evidence of additional crimes was introduced.

== Order for new trial ==
On September 3, 2023, Murdaugh's attorneys announced that they had evidence to file for a new murder trial. At a press conference held on September 5, Murdaugh attorneys Dick Harpootlian and Jim Griffin alleged jury tampering by Colleton County Clerk of Court Rebecca (Becky) Hill, who subsequently released a book on the case, Behind the Doors of Justice: The Murdaugh Murders. Dick Harpootlian and Griffin said that a number of jurors were upset about revelations in the book and spoke up about Hill's behavior. The lawyers requested an evidentiary hearing to determine whether there should be a new trial. Harpootlian also sent a letter to United States Attorney for the District of South Carolina Adair Ford Boroughs requesting a federal investigation of conduct in the case. Hill hired lawyers Justin Bamberg and Will Lewis to represent her in the case. Hill's book was subsequently withdrawn from circulation after her co-author, Neil Gordon, discovered Hill had plagiarized excerpts from BBC News reporter Holly Honderich's article about the case and included them verbatim in the book while passing them off as her own words.

On October 17, Chief Judge H. Bruce Williams of the South Carolina Court of Appeals signed an order granting Murdaugh's motion to suspend his conviction appeal and send the case back to circuit court to consider allegations of jury tampering by Hill. South Carolina Attorney General Alan Wilson asked SLED to investigate Hill as well. The Murdaugh legal team asked that Judge Clifton Newman be removed from this trial and all Murdaugh trials, stating their belief that he could not be impartial. Newman asked the South Carolina Supreme Court to remove him from the case, and they granted this request, issuing an order stating that former state supreme court justice Jean H. Toal would handle the motion for a new trial and retain responsibility for all future matters regarding this case. On January 29, 2024, Toal denied Murdaugh's motion for a new trial. At a press conference held on March 25, 2024, Hill, standing with her attorney Justin Bamberg, submitted her resignation from the post of Colleton County Clerk of Court to Governor Henry McMaster.

After the lower court's decision in January, Murdaugh's lawyers appealed to the state Supreme Court. On August 13, 2024, the Supreme Court agreed to review the lower court's decision. (Note: For non-death penalty murder convictions, first appeals are typically brought to the Court of Appeals first. However, Murdaugh's legal team received permission to appeal directly to the state Supreme Court.) On December 10, 2024, Murdaugh's attorneys filed a 132-page appeal with the South Carolina Supreme Court outlining their arguments for a retrial. By statute, the state had 30 days to respond to the appeal. The state was initially granted a 90-day extension, with an April 10, 2025 deadline to respond. On April 3, the state requested another extension, asserting that due to their workload, they needed additional time to prepare their response brief, and review the "almost-6000-page long trial transcript" and other related documents. While Murdaugh's team objected, the court granted a 120-day extension. The state filed their brief on August 8, 2025, and Murdaugh's team filed their reply to the state on September 9, 2025.

On May 14, 2025, Rebecca Hill was charged with three felonies including misconduct and perjury, based on an independent investigation by SLED. She had already resigned in 2024 amid the SLED investigation. On December 8, Hill pleaded guilty to obstruction of justice, perjury, and misconduct in office. She admitted to revealing sealed court exhibits to a member of the media and then lying about it. She also admitted to using her office to promote her book. She was sentenced to three years' probation, though the judge said he would have imposed a harsher sentence had evidence come to light that she had tampered with the jury.

On May 13, 2026, the South Carolina Supreme Court overturned Murdaugh's murder and weapon possession convictions and ordered a new trial, citing "shocking jury interference" by Hill. The unanimous opinion criticized Hill for using her status as "the primary caretaker of the jury" and "an officer of the court" to "essentially implore the jurors" to convict Murdaugh. It concluded that even if Murdaugh was guilty, Hill's "breathtaking and disgraceful effort...to undermine the jury process" was so egregious that there was no remedy short of a new trial. "Our federal and state constitutions simply cannot countenance such an assault on the right to a fair and impartial jury," the court wrote. Murdaugh remained imprisoned on a 40-year sentence relating to his theft convictions.

On May 18, 2026, Murdaugh filed a federal lawsuit against Hill, accusing her of violating his civil rights.

== Media portrayals ==
News media called it South Carolina's "trial of the century" and "arguably one of the most high-profile and sensational cases in South Carolina legal history".

There have been TV episodes, podcasts, and documentaries about the case. Some notable examples:

- Murdaugh Murders Podcast (2021; Liz Farrell and Mandy Matney)
- Low Country: The Murdaugh Dynasty (2022; HBO Max)
- Murdaugh Murders: Deadly Dynasty (2022; Investigation Discovery)
- Murdaugh Murders: A Southern Scandal (2023; Netflix)
- Murdaugh Murders: The Movie (2023, Lifetime)
- The Murder at Moselle (2024, Storm of Suspicion, season 5, episode 6) - this was the second of a two-part story; the first part, Fatal Fog (s5, e5), told the story of the death of Mallory Beach and Paul Murdaugh's involvement in it.
- Murdaugh: Death in the Family (2025; Hulu)
- Instadocs: Alex Murdaugh, Unconvicted (2026; Netflix)

== See also ==
- Murdaugh family
- Death of Mallory Beach
