= Murdaugh Murders Podcast =

True crime podcast

Murdaugh Murders Podcast (MMP) was a true crime podcast by Liz Farrell and Mandy Matney that ran from June 2021 to May 2023. In 2023, the podcast was renamed True Sunlight: Exposing Crime and Corruption, broadening its scope to other true crime stories.

== Plot ==
Mandy Matney investigated and blogged in real time about the unfolding case of Alex Murdaugh, who was accused of the murders of his wife, Maggie, and their son, Paul, on June 7, 2021. Her coverage was some of the most in-depth and detailed while events were transpiring. The case was complex and multi-faceted, she provided summaries, context, background, side stories, and broke new information. She examined the actions not only of Murdaugh but of the low country establishment, many of whom were ultimately found guilty of crimes.

== Reception ==
According to Apple Podcasts, in 2021 it was the number one ranked podcast in the world for that year. MMP also earned a top 10 spot in Apple's best new podcasts for 2021. According to the Washington Post, the podcast was influential by first introducing the public to the Murdaugh family and the trial and conviction of Alex Murdaugh. According to The Guardian, the podcast "enthralled the country" and was influential with major studios in deciding to make their own versions of the story. Matney's investigations often led to breaking new information about the case.

== Hulu series ==
In early 2023, the podcast began development as a scripted series for Hulu. In September 2024, Hulu announced that Michael D. Fuller and Erin Lee Carr are co-creators and executive producers for Murdaugh: Death in the Family. Nick Antosca and Alex Hedlund are also executive producers along with Mandy Matney. The leads are Jason Clarke as Alex Murdaugh and Patricia Arquette as Maggie Murdaugh. The series premiered on October 15, 2025.
