= Islandton, South Carolina =

- Census-designated place
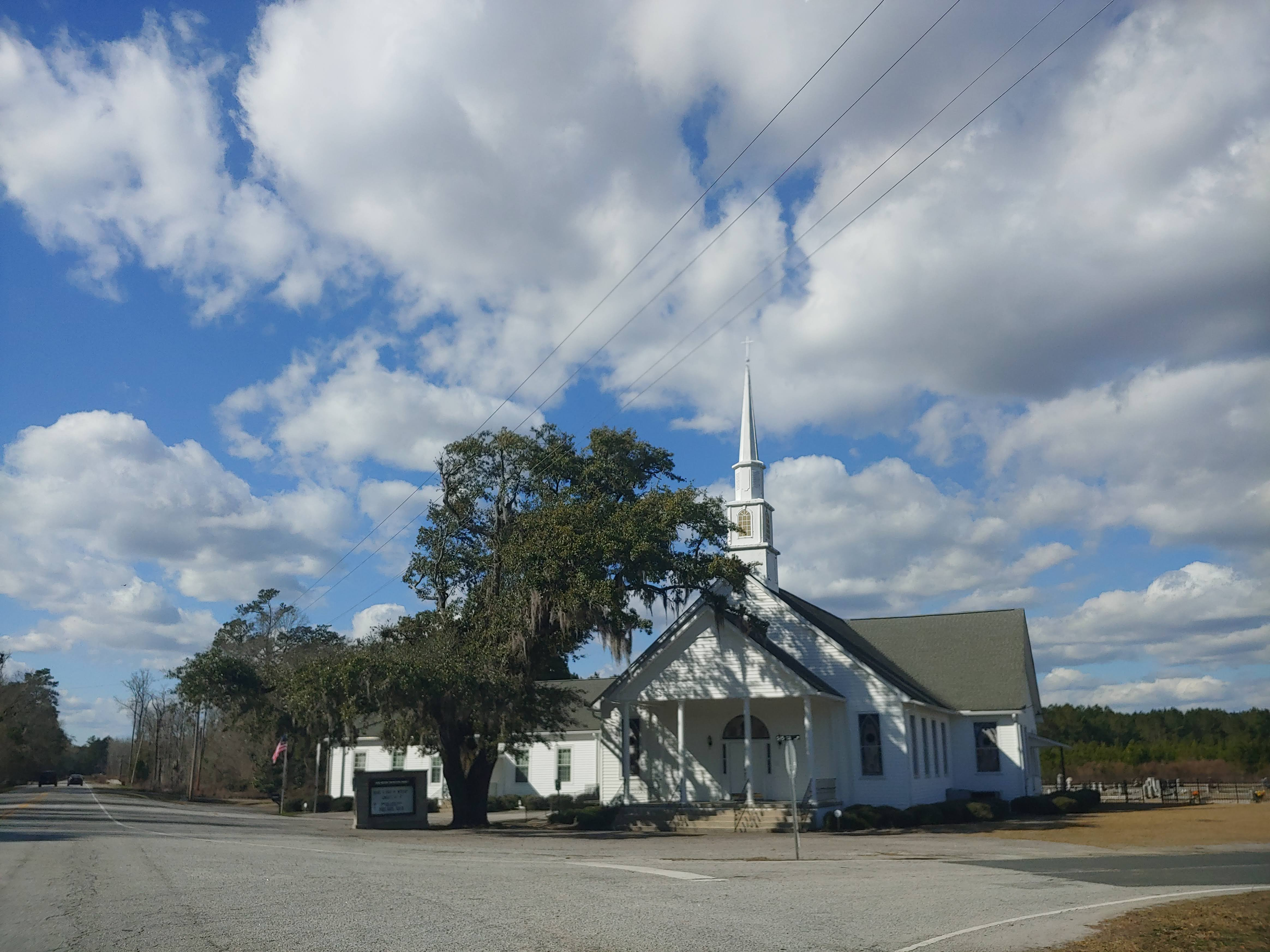
- Rice Patch Christian Church in Islandton, SC

- Location within South Carolina Location within the United States
- Coordinates: 32°54′33″N 80°56′09″W
- Country: United States
- State: South Carolina
- County: Colleton

Area
  - Total: 2.77 sq mi (7.17 km^{2})
  - Land: 2.77 sq mi (7.17 km^{2})
  - Water: 0 sq mi (0.00 km^{2})
- Elevation: 59 ft (18 m)

Population (2020)
  - Total: 58
  - Density: 21.0/sq mi (8.09/km^{2})
- Time zone: UTC-5 (Eastern (EST))
  - Summer (DST): UTC-4 (EDT)
- ZIP code: 29929
- Area codes: 843, 854
- GNIS feature ID: 2629833

Islandton is an unincorporated community and census-designated place in Colleton County, South Carolina, United States. As of the 2010 census, its population was 70. South Carolina Highway 63 passes through the community, leading east 17 miles (27 km) to Walterboro, the county seat, and southwest 10 miles (16 km) to Varnville. Islandton has a post office with ZIP code 29929.

== Demographics ==
Historical population
Census	Pop.	Note	%±
2020	58		—
U.S. Decennial Census

== Education ==
Colleton County School District is the area school district. The public high school for the entire county is Colleton County High School.

== Notable people ==
- Valerie Boles, root doctor
- Curtis B. Inabinett, politician
- Alex Murdaugh, lawyer
