= Randolph Murdaugh Sr. =

South Carolina attorney (1887–1940)

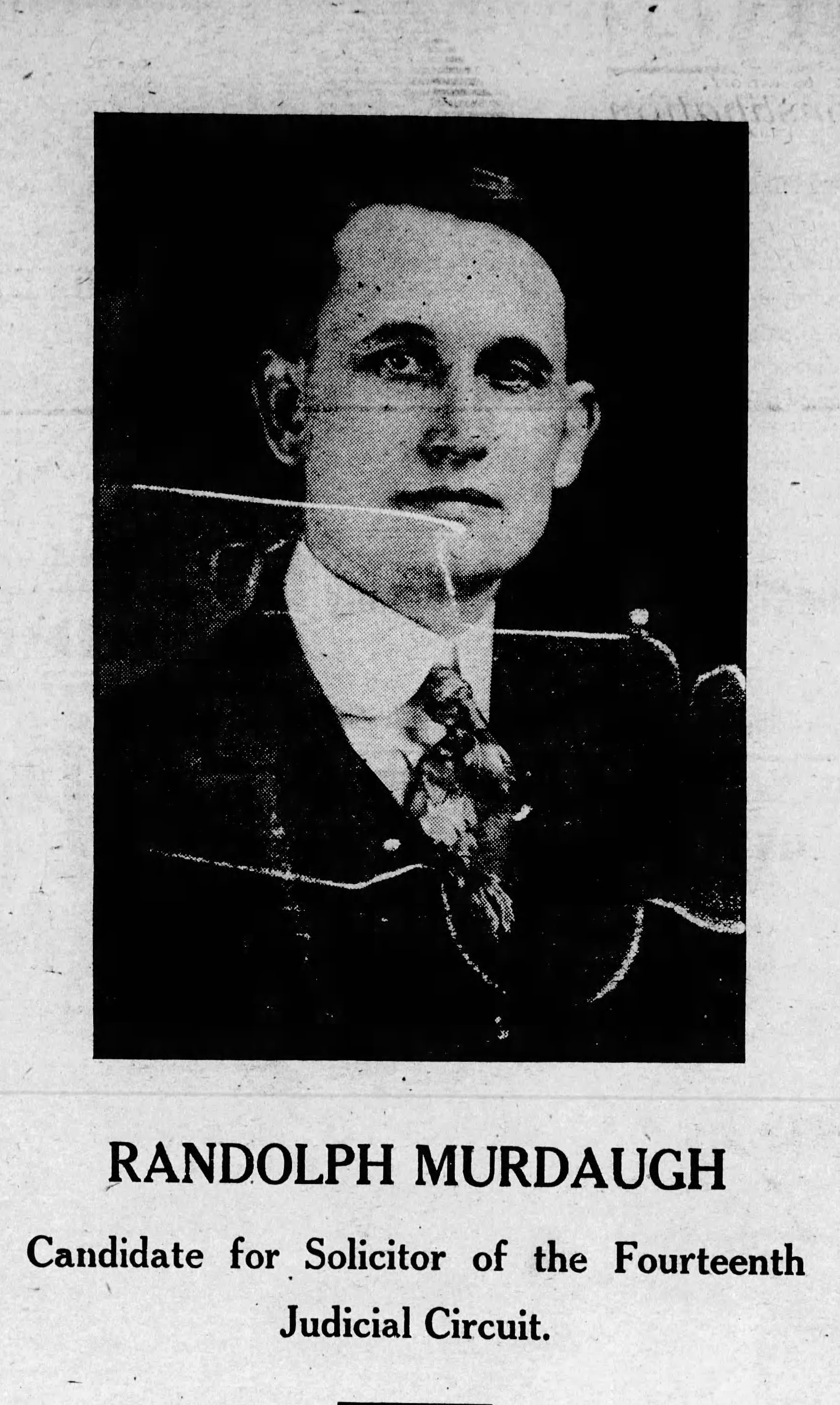
- Randolph Murdaugh Sr. in a campaign advertisement for his 1920 campaign

2nd Circuit solicitor for the 14th judicial district of South Carolina
- In office 1920–1940
- Preceded by: George Warren
- Succeeded by: Randolph Murdaugh Jr.

Personal details
- Born: February 28, 1887 Varnville, South Carolina
- Died: July 19, 1940 (aged 53) Hampton County, South Carolina
- Cause of death: Train vs. automobile collision
- Party: Democratic
- Spouses: Etta Causey Harvey (m. 1914; died 1918) Estelle Marvin (m. 1919; died 1937) Mary T. Hoffmann (m. 1937)
- Children: 2, including Randolph Jr.
- Relatives: Randolph Murdaugh III (grandson)
- Education: U.S. Naval Academy (attended); University of South Carolina (B.A., J.D.)
- Known for: Founding patriarch of the Murdaugh family

Randolph Murdaugh Sr. (February 28, 1887 – July 19, 1940) was an American attorney and politician from South Carolina who served as the circuit solicitor for the 14th judicial district from 1920 until his death in 1940. Randolph was the founding patriarch of the South Carolina Murdaugh family. He died when his car was struck by a train, suspected to be a suicide.

== Early life, education, and family ==
Randolph Murdaugh Sr. was born in Varnville on February 28, 1887, the youngest son of Josiah Putnam Murdaugh II (1830 – August 17, 1912), a wealthy Lowcountry businessman and Confederate States Army veteran, and Annie Marvin Davis (August 4, 1847 – August 6, 1919), a distant cousin of Confederate President Jefferson Davis. Josiah, also known as "Captain Joe," had fought in Hampton's Legion and was injured in 1862, returning to combat only three months later. Two years before Murdaugh was born, his parents moved to Varnville, South Carolina, later buying land south of the town in an area known as Almeda.

Murdaugh received a public school education until high school, when he switched to a private school. Murdaugh initially attended the University of South Carolina, where he played on the football and baseball teams, but transferred to the United States Naval Academy in the summer of 1906, after completing his sophomore year. However, he was soon medically disqualified after physical examinations revealed heart murmers and "signs of [an] enlarged heart." Murdaugh returned to the University of South Carolina, receiving a bachelor's of arts in 1908 and graduating from its law school in 1910. Though an academically-mediocre law student, Murdaugh was elected president of the student bar association and was generally respected by his peers. During his university studies, Murdaugh received the nickname "Buster."

In 1910, he founded a one-man law firm in Hampton, South Carolina, 78 miles (126 kilometers) west of Charleston and worked as the town attorney. In 1911 and 1915, he was appointed to the school board for Hampton County for two-year terms. In 1912, 1916, and 1918 he was a delegate for Hampton County to the Democratic Party state convention. He founded The Hampton County Herald in 1916.

== Circuit solicitor ==
In 1920, incumbent solicitor for the 14th judicial circuit George Warren resigned in March 1920 to run for U.S. Senate; Murdaugh quickly announced his campaign for the open circuit solicitor seat the same month, promising to be a "faithful, fearless, and competent" public servant "who cannot be influenced or intimidated to depart from his duty as solicitor." He faced Heber Padgett and R.M. Jefferies in the Democratic primary and was endorsed by the Hampton County Democratic Party. He advanced to a runoff with Jefferies after the August 31st primary. He won the runoff and the seat in the September runoff. In 1920 he became the solicitor in the 14th judicial circuit.

Early into his first term, Murdaugh successfully convicted Jake Terry for the murder of Thaddeus Fulton, a romantic rival, while Fulton was praying in a church; Murdaugh sent Terry to the electric chair. The same year he was elected, T. Hagood Gooding was re-elected as Hampton County auditor despite Gooding being known as particularly corrupt and having been prosecuted by the state tax commission under Governor Robert Archer Cooper in 1919. Murdaugh prosecuted both Gooding and W.A. Mason, another county auditor, for the state eventually leading to their removal from office. In 1922, he prosecuted Colleton County sheriff W.B. Ackerman for embezzlement. While solicitor, he represented a governor, prosecuted another, and was known to fill the courthouse gallery during murder trials. He held the position until 1940 when he was killed in a collision between his car and a freight train.

Described by Murdaugh family biographer Jason Ryan,

"Randolph's appeal in the Lowcountry was so strong he could stake out the occasional progressive position or try a controversial case without alienating his supporters. While other solicitors demurred, he stated publicly in 1935 that women should be allowed to serve on state juries, believing 'their presence would have a good influence.' A year later he tried a White magistrate in Colleton County for public malfeasance, accusing the official of failing to disburse all of a deceased Black man's money to his heirs. Yet at other times, when convenient, Randolph could help keep blacks down and reinforce the notion of White supremacy, such as his use of a racial slur in the trial of Willie Heyward in 1932. (Note: During the murder trial for the shooting death of white police officer Benjamin Paul Carden, Murdaugh asked Heyward, "Willie, you are not a darkey that can be scared at all, can you?") Also in 1932, during the murder trial of an Estill man accused of killing a road foreman, Randolph said that the testimony of a single White witness, who believed an unlawful murder occurred, was preferable to the accounts of six Black men, who testified the killing was justified."

== Personal life and death ==
Murdaugh married Etta Causey Harvey in 1914 and they had two sons together, Randolph "Buster" Murdaugh Jr. and John Glen "Johnny" Murdaugh. On September 15, 1918, Etta died of blood poisoning shortly after giving birth to Johnny; she was 29. A year after Etta's death, on November 30, 1919, Murdaugh married Estelle Marvin, remaining married until her death in February 1937. Murdaugh would remarry that same year to Mary T. Hoffmann.

Murdaugh was an Episcopalian, member of the Freemasons, Knights of Pythias, member of the Benevolent and Protective Order of Elks, Woodman of the World, and member of the Junior Order of United American Mechanics and Sigma Alpha Epsilon fraternities.

On the night of July 18, 1940, Murdaugh's car "crashed into a Charleston and Western Carolina freight train at a grade crossing about five miles south of Varnville." Murdaugh's body was launched 150 feet. In the months before his death, Randolph was sick and his son, Buster, would frequently fill in for him at court. The death was officially ruled an accident by the coroner. However, W.W. Bartlett, the engineer of the train, told investigators that he observed the vehicle deliberately drive onto the tracks as the train approached, with its driver waving and laughing at the train crew. Brakeman J.H. Montgomery corroborated Bartlett, stating, "This man drove up in the middle of the track and stopped and was looking up at the engine. He looked like he was waving to us and we couldn't stop and we ran right into him." After his death, Buster sued Charleston and Western Carolina Railway and the parties settled for an undisclosed sum.
