= Murtagh (name) =

Murtagh is both a surname and given name. People with the name include:

== Surname ==
- Andy Murtagh (born 1949), Irish-born English cricketer, uncle of Chris and Tim
- Ariel Murtagh (born 2001), American model, writer and activist
- Brendan Murtagh (born 1983), Irish hurler
- Charlie Murtagh (born 1949), Irish rugby player and coach
- Chris Murtagh (born 1984), English cricketer, brother of Tim, nephew of Andy
- Ciarán Murtagh (born 1992), Gaelic footballer for Roscommon
- Conall Murtagh (born 1985), Northern Irish footballer
- Diarmaid Murtagh (born 1982), Irish actor
- Eugene Murtagh (born 1942), Irish billionaire businessman, founder of Kingspan Group
- Fiona Murtagh (born 1967), England netball international
- Fiona Murtagh (born 1995), Irish rower
- John Murtagh (born 1967), New Zealand cricketer
- Johnny Murtagh (born 1970), Irish jockey
- Kate Murtagh (1920–2017), American actress and singer
- Keiran Murtagh (born 1988), Antigua and Barbuda footballer
- Lisa Murtagh, Rose of Tralee winner
- Mickey Murtagh (1904–1993), American football player
- Owen Murtagh (1887–1937), Australian rules footballer
- Patrick Murtagh (born 2000), Australian American football player
- Tim Murtagh (born 1981), Irish cricketer, brother of Chris, nephew of Andy
- Valerie Murtagh (born 1936) and Elaine Murtagh (born 1940) of the singing group The Avons
- William J. Murtagh (1932–2018), American historian

== Given name ==
- St. Murtagh, Irish bishop
- Murtagh King (c. 1562– c. 1639), Irish translator and scribe
- John Murtagh Macrossan (1832–1891), Australian politician
- John Murtagh Macrossan (judge) (1930–2008), Australian barrister and judge
- Murtagh Morgan (fl. 1925–1981), Irish unionist and politician
- Murtagh Dulenagh O'Neill (fl. 1533), lord of medieval Ireland
- Murtagh Roe O'Neill (fl. 1468), lord of medieval Ireland

== See also ==
- Murtagh (disambiguation)
