= Owen Murtagh =

Australian rules footballer (1887–1937)

Personal information
- Full name: Owen Alphonsus Murtagh
- Born: 9 November 1887; Prahran, Victoria
- Died: 18 February 1937 (aged 49); Herston, Queensland
- Original team: Bunyip

Playing career^{1}
Years	Club	Games (Goals)
1909	St Kilda	1 (0)
1909	Williamstown (VFA)	2 (0)
- ^{1} Playing statistics correct to the end of 1909.

Owen Alphonsus Murtagh (9 November 1887 – 18 February 1937) was an Australian rules footballer who played with St Kilda in the Victorian Football League (VFL).
