= John Murtaugh =

John Murtaugh may refer to:

- John F. Murtaugh (1874–1918), American lawyer and politician from New York
- John Brian Murtaugh (1937–2017), American politician from New York
