= Murdaugh family =

South Carolina family

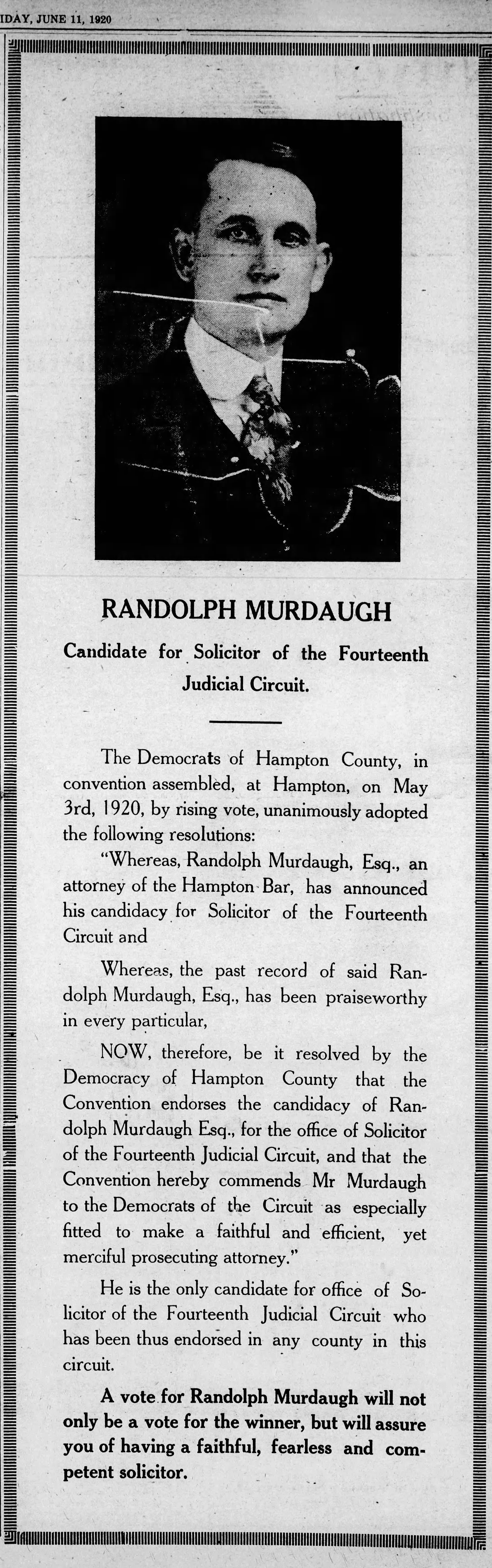
Beaufort Gazette, 1920: Randolph Murdaugh Sr., candidate for solicitor of the 14th judicial district

The Murdaugh family (/ˈmɜːrdɒk/ MUR-dock) is an American family from the Lowcountry region of South Carolina. Three generations named Randolph Murdaugh served consecutively as circuit solicitor (the elected prosecuting attorney) for the state's 14th judicial district between 1920 and 2006. The family's prominence led locals to call the five-county district "Murdaugh Country". In addition to the legal positions, Randolph Murdaugh Sr. established the Murdaugh family law firm, now called the Parker Law Group, which specializes in personal injury litigation.

A fourth-generation son, affluent lawyer Richard Alexander "Alex" Murdaugh, secretly led a life of crime that included acts of fraud, corruption, embezzlement, theft and drug offenses spanning decades and involving dozens of victims, many of whom were disadvantaged. The crimes culminated in 2021 when Alex allegedly murdered his wife Maggie and son Paul using multiple guns at close range. Alex's trial ended with his conviction and sentencing to two consecutive life sentences in prison without the possibility of parole. These convictions were overturned in 2026, after the Supreme Court of South Carolina ruled that "shocking jury interference" by a court clerk during the 2023 trial meant that Alex's convictions were compromised. The case captured national attention for many years and generated extensive media coverage, films and books.

== 14th District ==
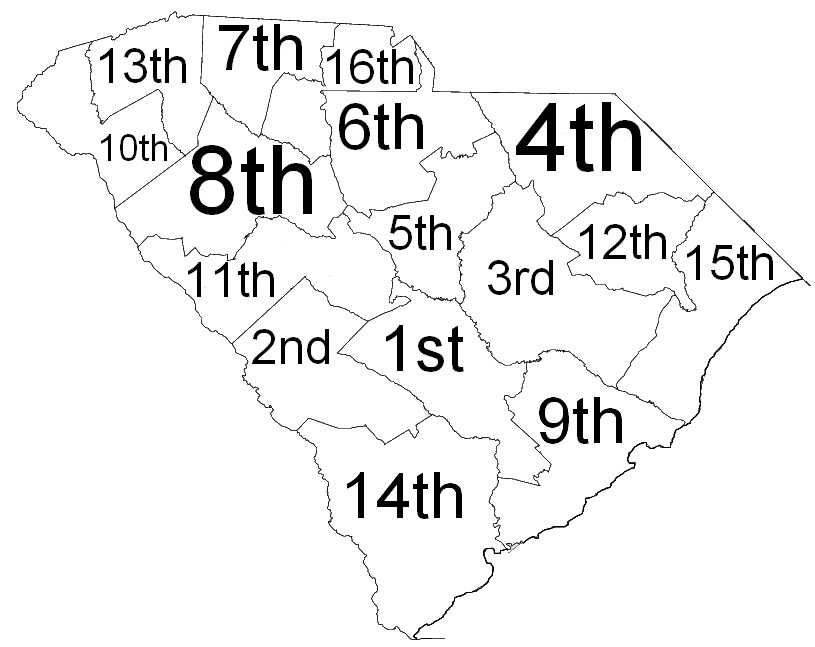
A map showing the judicial circuit districts of South Carolina

From 1920 to 2006, three members of the Murdaugh family served as the 2nd, 3rd and 4th circuit solicitors for the five-county area of South Carolina's Lowcountry region within the 14th judicial district; the family's influence in the area led to it being colloquially known as "Murdaugh Country".

In South Carolina, the circuit solicitor–analogous to the district attorney in other U.S. jurisdictions–is in charge of prosecuting all criminal cases within their jurisdiction. The 14th judicial district oversees Allendale, Colleton, Hampton, Beaufort and Jasper counties. It is the only judicial circuit in the state to cover five counties. According to columnist Kathleen Parker, the justice system of the 14th district was regarded as rigged and local attorneys would make a motion to settle a case rather than go to trial there.

The Murdaugh family was one of South Carolina's most prominent legal families, and were featured in the cover story for a 1989 issue of Carolina Lawyer magazine. Because of the family's decades-long control of the office of circuit solicitor in the 14th district, they wielded enormous judicial and political power for almost a century. Following several criminal incidents involving Murdaugh family members in the late 2010s and early 2020s, their influence over the local judicial system was scrutinized.

== Family law firm ==
The Murdaugh family law firm, formerly known as Peters Murdaugh Parker Eltzroth & Detrick (PMPED), specialized in personal injury litigation. PMPED built its success in the early 2000s due to a state law that made it easier for plaintiffs to forum shop. The law permitted South Carolina residents "to file a suit in any county in which an out-of-state company own[ed] property and conduct[ed] business—regardless of where an accident took place."

In Hampton County, trial judges generally avoided transferring cases, and plaintiffs' attorneys had a reputation for abusing subpoena power. This legal climate led to the 14th district being named the third worst "judicial hellhole for defendants" by the American Tort Reform Association. Because of PMPED's success in suing CSX Transportation, the county was known as a "site of pilgrimage" for those with personal injury lawsuits against railroads; PMPED's offices became known locally as "the house that CSX built". Due to the firm's activities, doing business in Hampton County became a legal liability, resulting in the county losing potential employers.

Reforms enacted in 2005 by both the state supreme court and state legislature changed South Carolina's corporate venue law, ending plaintiffs' ability to easily forum shop in Hampton County. PMPED changed its name to The Parker Law Group in 2022 shortly before Alex Murdaugh's murder trial.

== Murdaugh hunting estate ==
The Murdaugh family hunting estate near Islandton, situated on the Salkehatchie River, was formerly called Moselle. After the convictions of Alex Murdaugh for the murders of his wife and son, which took place on the estate, the 1,770 acre property was rebranded Cross Swamp Farm and listed for sale. It sold for $3.9 million to buyers who wanted the land for hunting and farming. The new owners were not interested in the house and partitioned the buildings and about 21 surrounding acres into a separate property and resold it in 2024 for $1 million, well below market value. The buyer was a locally based home restoration professional who quickly made significant changes to the look and layout of the house.

== Notable members ==
=== Randolph Murdaugh Sr. ===
Randolph Murdaugh Sr. was born in Varnville in 1887, the youngest son of Josiah Putnam Murdaugh II, a wealthy Lowcountry businessman, and Annie Marvin Murdaugh (née Davis). His maternal grandfather, Joseph W. Davis, was a cousin of Confederate President Jefferson Davis.

Randolph Sr. attended the United States Naval Academy and graduated from the University of South Carolina (USC) law school in 1910. After graduation, he founded a one-man law firm in Hampton, 78 miles (126 kilometers) west of Charleston, Randolph Sr. married Etta Causey Harvey in 1914 and they had two sons, Randolph "Buster" Murdaugh Jr. and John Glen "Johnny" Murdaugh.

In 1920, Randolph Sr. became solicitor in the 14th judicial circuit. He held the position until 1940, when he was killed in a collision between his car and a Charleston and Western Carolina (C&WC) freight train at a grade crossing outside Varnville.

=== Randolph "Buster" Murdaugh Jr. ===
Randolph Sr. was succeeded by his son, Randolph "Buster" Murdaugh Jr., who served as circuit solicitor from 1940 to 1986. In his forty-six years in office, Buster ran opposed only twice. A few months after the train collision, Buster sued the C&WC, claiming that poor maintenance of the grade crossing had contributed to his father's death. Although there was speculation that the crash wasn't an accident, with some believing that Randolph Sr. intentionally stopped his car on the tracks to commit suicide or that the crash was alcohol-related, the C&WC settled the lawsuit for an undisclosed sum.

Buster was known for "his love of chewing tobacco, his courtroom prowess and his flair for acting out murders before spellbound juries". According to Professor John Blume of Cornell Law School, Buster was rebuked several times by the state supreme court for improper closing arguments in death penalty cases and for arguing in a rape case that if the defendant were acquitted, he would release other accused rapists. In 1956, he was indicted by a federal grand jury for allegedly warning a bootlegger to move a moonshine still into a neighboring county to avoid revenuers; he was acquitted. Buster retired in 1986 and died in 1998.

=== John Glen "Johnny" Murdaugh ===
Randolph Sr.'s younger son, Johnny Murdaugh (1918–1987), joined the United States Army and served as a paratrooper in World War II. He was the highest decorated veteran of that war from Hampton County, receiving a Silver Star, two Bronze Stars and two Purple Hearts. After the war, he left the Army and returned to Hampton County and became a farmer.

=== Randolph Murdaugh III ===
Buster was succeeded as solicitor by his son, Randolph Murdaugh III, who took office in 1986. He ran unopposed in every election and held office until retiring in 2006. Randolph III was married to Elizabeth Alexander and had four children including three sons, Randolph IV (called Randy) and Richard Alexander (called Alex, b. May 27, 1968), both of whom entered the Peters, Murdaugh, Parker, Eltzroth & Detrick (PMPED) law firm; and John Marvin. In 2019 Randolph III was awarded the Order of the Palmetto, South Carolina's highest civilian recognition, by Governor Henry McMaster. He retired in 2006 and died of natural causes on June 10, 2021.

=== Alex Murdaugh ===
Richard Alexander Murdaugh was born May 27, 1968. He graduated from University of South Carolina in 1990 and from University of South Carolina's School of Law in 1994. He soon joined the Peters, Murdaugh, Parker, Eltzroth & Detrick (PMPED) law firm, volunteering part-time in the 14th-circuit solicitor's office. Alex married Margaret Kennedy Branstetter (called Maggie) and had two sons, Richard Alexander Jr. (called Buster) and Paul.

On March 2, 2023, Alex was convicted of the shooting deaths of Margaret and Paul and was sentenced to two life sentences in prison without the possibility of parole. In May 2026, the South Carolina Supreme Court overturned his murder and weapons possession convictions and ordered a new trial due to jury interference by court clerk Becky Hill. Murdaugh remained imprisoned on a 40-year sentence relating to his theft and fraud convictions.

=== Maggie Murdaugh ===
Margaret "Maggie" Kennedy Branstetter Murdaugh (September 15, 1968 – June 7, 2021) was Alex Murdaugh's wife and a socialite.

=== Buster Murdaugh ===
Richard Alexander "Buster" Murdaugh Jr. (b. April 11, 1996) is the surviving son of Alex and Maggie Murdaugh. He received an undergraduate degree from Wofford College, in 2018, and then went to law school at his father's alma mater the University of South Carolina School of Law. After his first year, he was not readmitted due to a low-grade-point average. His father reportedly paid a lawyer $60,000 to lobby the dean for Buster to be re-admitted with an upwardly adjusted GPA.

In the Stephen Smith death case, Buster was mentioned dozens of times by both witnesses and investigators as possibly being involved. Buster was also alleged to have had a relationship with Smith, who was openly gay. Buster has denied involvement with Smith saying: "These baseless rumors of my involvement with Stephen and his death are false." Buster offered an alibi, saying he was at the family beach house in Edisto Beach with his mother and brother (now both deceased), when Smith was killed. In June 2024, Buster sued Netflix, Warner Bros. and others for defamation, saying he was falsely accused of murder.

In the Mallory Beach death case, Buster was implicated because he had loaned his ID to his younger brother Paul, who was similar in appearance but underaged, so that he could illegally buy alcohol. In January 2023 Buster reached a settlement with Beach's family and three other passengers involved in the fatal crash.

According to his testimony in the Maggie and Paul murder case, Buster, who maintains his father's innocence, was over 200 miles away at his girlfriend's house in Rock Hill, when the murders took place. After receiving a phone call from Alex telling him that his mother and brother had been shot dead, he immediately drove to Moselle.

=== Paul Murdaugh ===
At the time of his murder, Paul Terry Murdaugh (April 14, 1999 – June 7, 2021) was under criminal indictment for the wrongful death of Mallory Beach. He was a student at the University of South Carolina and had a summer job working at his uncle John Marvin Murdaugh's Kubota tractor dealership.

== Prosecutions and lawsuits against Alex Murdaugh ==
By 2023, Alex Murdaugh faced, or had been convicted of, a total of 102 grand jury criminal charges and 19 indictments relating to fraud and drug offenses. There were three charges from the Hampton County grand jury and 99 from the State Grand Jury. Murdaugh was also a defendant in three separate lawsuits. He has been disbarred, has had his assets seized, and is currently imprisoned on a 40-year sentence relating to his theft and fraud convictions.

=== Ongoing investigations and legal actions ===
==== Murder of Stephen Smith ====
On July 8, 2015, Stephen Smith, a 19-year-old nursing student at Orangeburg–Calhoun Technical College, was found dead from blunt force trauma on a rural road in Hampton County approximately 15 miles from the Murdaugh family's Moselle estate. The case was initially ruled a hit and run, with no suspects arrested. Smith was openly gay and a high school classmate of Alex's older son, Buster. Witnesses interviewed as part of the original investigation repeatedly implicated Buster as having been involved in a relationship with Smith, but the case went cold. According to The Greenville News, "rumors hinting at a cover-up and the possible involvement of one or more members of the Murdaugh family ... began circulating around the Hampton County area" soon after Smith's death. According to the Beaufort County Island Packet, the case "reeked of insider interference".

In June 2021, South Carolina Law Enforcement Division (SLED) re-opened the investigation into Smith's death, based on evidence found while investigating the deaths of Maggie and Paul Murdaugh. On March 22, 2023, SLED stated that Smith's death was a murder and not a hit-and-run accident. Buster released a statement to the press denying his involvement in which he said that he was at the family beach house in Edisto Beach with his mother and brother when Smith was killed, and that "these baseless rumors of my involvement with Stephen and his death are false." No further developments in the case had occurred by 2026.

==== Death of Gloria Satterfield ====
On February 2, 2018, the Murdaughs' longtime housekeeper, Gloria Satterfield, suffered a severe head injury when she allegedly was tripped by one of the Murdaughs' dogs and fell down the front steps of the family home on the Moselle estate. She died in a hospital on February 26, 2018, of complications related to the fall, including a stroke. The incident had been reported as a "trip and fall" accident, but no coroner was notified, no autopsy was performed and the death certificate, incongruously, attributed the death to "natural causes." A coroner testified that describing her death on the death certificate as "natural" was improper.

Satterfield's two sons were awarded a $4.3-million insurance policy payout from the Murdaughs' insurer for her accidental and/or natural death, but by 2021 they had not received any money. According to sources, Alex Murdaugh, banker Chad Westendorf, and attorney Cory Fleming conspired to steal the payout by diverting the money to Alex's bank account, then not notifying the Satterfields that the payout had occurred. The Satterfields, represented by malpractice attorney Eric Bland, were ultimately able to recover more than $6.5 million during subsequent lawsuits.

On September 15, 2021, authorities announced they opened a criminal investigation into Gloria Satterfield's death. In June 2022, authorities received permission to exhume her body to continue investigating her death.

In August 2023, Cory Fleming pleaded guilty to 23 charges including breach of trust with fraudulent intent and money laundering and was subsequently sentenced to 13 years, 10 months in prison and disbarred. On November 28, 2023, Murdaugh pleaded guilty to embezzling the insurance money and was sentenced to 27 years in prison for this and other financial crimes. Chad Westendorf was not indicted and was dropped from the subsequent lawsuits, but his bank's (Palmetto State Bank) CEO was fired.

==== Death of Mallory Beach ====
In February 2019, Alex's younger son, Paul Murdaugh, was charged with three felonies following the death of his teenage friend, Mallory Beach, in a boating accident. Paul's blood alcohol content was .286, over three times the legal limit for operating a motor vehicle (though at the time of the accident, Paul was underage and the legal limit did not apply); yet, despite being the driver of the boat, Paul was not given a field sobriety test, was not taken to jail for booking, nor was he ever handcuffed. This led to the speculation that he had received special treatment owing to his family connections. There were also reports that Alex Murdaugh had sought to influence the testimony of witnesses against Paul. The judge denied a prosecutorial request that he wear an alcohol monitor.

In their wrongful death lawsuit against the Murdaughs, Beach's family implicated Alex and Buster in providing alcohol to the then-underage Paul. As of September 2021, SLED was investigating allegations that police may have been pressured not to charge Paul. The family of Connor Cook, one of the teens aboard the boat during the accident, filed a lawsuit claiming Alex had encouraged them to retain attorney Cory Fleming in order to orchestrate the protection of Paul.

The Beach case began the unraveling of Alex's criminal enterprise by exposing information that led to an inquiry into his alleged financial wrongdoing. In the days before the killing of Maggie and Paul, a judge had scheduled a hearing to consider a motion to compel Alex to turn over his financial records. Likewise, Maggie had arranged for a forensic accountant to review the family finances.

==== Assisted suicide fraud ====
On September 3, 2021, Alex resigned from his law firm, Peters, Murdaugh, Parker, Eltzroth & Detrick (PMPED), after the firm confronted him over suspected embezzlement. According to The New York Times, the amount involved was "in the millions." From this point forward, "Alex Murdaugh's house of cards began to collapse", and the case became a national sensation making regular mainstream headlines.

The following day, Alex was grazed by a gunshot to the head while changing a tire on a rural road. He claimed a truck slowed down, shot him, and drove away. The injury was superficial, and he was released from the hospital soon after. On September 6, Alex released a statement saying he was entering a rehabilitation facility in Orlando, Florida, for substance abuse treatment.

On September 14, SLED announced that Alex's former client and distant cousin, Curtis Edward Smith – who had also been Alex's source for an oxycodone addiction – had been arrested for having conspired with Alex to kill him in the roadside shooting. Alex's death would have allowed his son Buster to receive a $10-million insurance payout. Smith was charged with assisted suicide, aggravated assault and battery, and insurance fraud. Alex, suffering from "massive depression," and wanting to kill himself, admitted to concocting the assisted suicide as a murder scheme. He claimed he was motivated by a mistaken belief that Buster would not receive the insurance money if Alex committed suicide himself. On November 4, the Hampton County grand jury issued three charges against Alex in the assisted suicide scheme.

Curtis Edward Smith denied the version of events. He said it had nothing to do with insurance fraud, and that he never shot Alex, only pointed the gun towards the sky and fired to scare "sense" into Alex.

==== Embezzlement ====
Attorney Justin Bamberg represents eight people, including the sons of Gloria Satterfield, from whom he says Alex stole money while serving as their lawyer. He later said the total number of embezzlement victims might be between thirty and fifty, and the total amount stolen could be as high as $20 million. According to the Island Packet, it is unclear what became of the money.

Hakeem Pinckney was a deaf African-American man involved in a 2009 traffic accident that required permanent life support. Murdaugh personally represented Pinckney's family in a lawsuit against the manufacturer of the tires on the vehicle; the family was awarded a settlement. In 2011, Pinckney died at a care facility after his ventilator was, according to a Pinckney lawyer, "mysteriously unplugged". PMPED handled a wrongful-death lawsuit against the care facility. Murdaugh allegedly introduced Pinckney's family to Russell Laffitte, the CEO of Palmetto State Bank, to manage the Pinckney finances due to the size of the settlements. The Pinckneys received some money, but an estimated $800,000 to $1 million went missing. In January 2022, the board of Palmetto State Bank fired Laffitte after allegations came to light that he conspired with Alex to defraud Pinckney.

The family of Blondell Gray, who was killed in an ambulance crash in 2012, is currently owed more than $112,000 which was stolen by Alex. The mother of Sandra Taylor, a Beaufort resident killed by a drunk driver in Colleton County in 2019, received only $30,000 of an $180,000 settlement. Murdaugh pleaded guilty and was sentenced on November 28, 2023, to 27 years in prison for these and other financial crimes.

==== Charges for narcotics distribution ====
In June 2022, Alex Murdaugh was indicted on two counts by the State Grand Jury related to conspiring with accomplice Curtis Edward Smith (a distant cousin) to purchase and distribute narcotics using a money-laundering scheme involving $2.4 million in stolen money. The indictment alleges that Murdaugh and Smith used hundreds of illegal transactions "to facilitate the acquisition and distribution of illegally obtained narcotics" in several counties throughout South Carolina over eight years starting in 2013.

==== Lindsey Edwards allegations ====
In August 2022, a South Carolina-based former sex worker named Lindsey Edwards was interviewed on FITSNews. She claimed she first "serviced" Alex Murdaugh at a private party with other locally powerful unnamed men where drugs were being consumed. She said the encounter turned into rape when he began choking her as she clawed at his arms to escape while being "violently penetrated". Edwards said normally such an encounter would be handled by her madam's bouncer, but the madam chose not to intervene because the madam had an exchange of services agreement with Murdaugh. Edwards alleged at least three more similar violent "sessions" with Murdaugh in which she was beaten and where she was forced to service Murdaugh against her will by the madam and her armed bouncer. The accusations are being investigated by SLED.

==== Forge Consulting lawsuit ====
On September 12, 2022, Forge Consulting announced it would file a lawsuit against Alex Murdaugh and Bank of America because Forge "suffered serious harm to its business reputation and credibility because of Murdaugh and BoA". Forge alleges Murdaugh "set up a fake bank account using the Forge brand to take millions of dollars from his clients and colleagues" and further blames BoA for not doing basic due diligence to detect the fraud.

==== Santis-Cristiani lawsuit ====
On October 7, 2022, a lawsuit named Murdaugh, Crosby, Barnes, the PMPED firm, Laffitte, and Palmetto State Bank as part of a conspiracy to defraud plaintiff Manuel Santis-Cristiani of Chiapas, Mexico, of accident settlement money he was awarded but never received.

==== Criminal tax evasion ====
On December 16, 2022, Alex Murdaugh was indicted by the State Grand Jury on nine charges of evading nearly $487,000 in state income taxes. The indictment reflects that he stole nearly $7 million meant for his law firm's bank accounts and failed to pay taxes on the ill-gotten gains.

=== Convictions, civil judgments, settlements, and sanctions ===
==== Asset custody ====
In September 2021, Murdaugh gave broad powers of attorney to his son Buster, including the power to sell and dispose of his assets, which Buster proceeded to do. The Moselle property, the scene of the murders of Maggie and Paul, was rebranded as "Cross Swamp Farm" and listed for sale with an asking price of $3.9 million, and the Edisto beach house was placed on the market for $920,000.00. On November 1, 2021, a judge ordered the Murdaugh assets to be frozen. Buster and Alex sought to overturn it, saying they had no money to pay for food, medical insurance and utilities.

Murdaugh's assets were placed into a receivership, created because evidence suggested the Murdaugh family was moving and hiding money from potential creditors, including multiple plaintiffs. The Murdaugh family and attorneys have been trying to unwind the receivership in civil court.

==== Physical custody ====
On October 14, 2021, concurrent with his release from the drug rehabilitation facility in Orlando, Murdaugh was taken into custody by the SLED on two felony counts of Obtaining Property by False Pretenses, related to the Satterfield case. Body cam footage of the arrest suggested he had "significant diarrhea issues" related to opioid withdrawal.

Unable to pay the bail on the fraud charges, set at $7 million, Murdaugh was held in custody at Alvin Glenn Detention Center in Richland County from October 14, 2021. Murdaugh was denied bail entirely after being charged with the murders of Maggie and Paul. While in the Detention Center waiting for his murder trial to begin, Murdaugh was involved in a fight with another inmate, Robert Drayton. Drayton had been convicted of raping Murdaugh's niece in May 2021— and was antagonizing Murdaugh when they were out together in an open area.

On March 3, 2023, when he was sentenced to life in prison for the murder of his wife and son, Murdaugh was taken to the Kirkland Correctional Institution, in northwestern Columbia, South Carolina, where he was to be evaluated for about 45 days to determine which maximum-security prison he would be sent to.

==== Disbarment ====
On July 12, 2022, the South Carolina Supreme Court issued an official order disbarring Murdaugh from the practice of law in South Carolina. It was based on Murdaugh's "admitted reprehensible misconduct." Murdaugh was allowed to contest the disbarment but did not.

==== Murders of Maggie and Paul ====
On June 7, 2021, Alex called police from his cell phone at 10:06 p.m., saying he had discovered the bodies of 22-year-old son Paul and 52-year-old wife Maggie near the dog kennels at the family's hunting lodge located on a 1,772-acre estate in Islandton, South Carolina. Both had been shot multiple times and with different weapons. Alex initially claimed that at the time of the killings he had been with his mother, who has dementia. It has been revealed that Maggie was considering ending her marriage to Alex, and had consulted a divorce lawyer in Charleston, South Carolina, several weeks prior to the murders.

In October 2021, it was revealed that SLED had regarded Alex as a person of interest in the homicides since the start of the investigation. In July 2022, Alex Murdaugh was indicted for the murders of his wife, Maggie, and his son, Paul. Prosecutors suggested a motive where Murdaugh sought a distraction from his financial crimes, which were beginning to go public, and to garner sympathy. Alex pleaded not guilty. On March 2, 2023, Alex Murdaugh was convicted of both murders and subsequently sentenced to two consecutive life sentences without the possibility of parole.

Murdaugh appealed the conviction because the jury was tampered with by court clerk Becky Hill. In May 2026 the state Supreme Court unanimously overturned the murder conviction, ruling that Hill's actions had tainted the murder trial. Prosecutors stated that they plan to retry the case.

==== Fraud and money laundering charges ====
===== State indictments =====
On November 19, 2021, the State Grand Jury issued five indictments against Alex Murdaugh on 27 charges of embezzlement and other crimes, including breach of trust, fraudulent intent, money laundering, computer crimes, and forgery. The victims were Thomas L. Moore (patrol officer), Deon J. Martin, Gloria Satterfield (Murdaugh housekeeper), and Manuel Santis-Cristiani. Altogether the fraud amount was close to $4.8 million resulting in 88 criminal charges. On December 9, an additional 21 criminal charges were filed connected to an alleged scheme that sought to defraud victims of more than $6 million.

On January 21, 2022, the State Grand Jury issued a further 23 criminal charges, which included 19 breaches of trust with fraudulent intent, and four counts of computer crimes. The indictments allege that he stole more than $2.6 million from clients Natarsha Thomas, Arthur Badger, Deon Martin, and the family of Hakeem Pinckney. On March 16, 2022, the State Grand Jury issued a superseding indictment against Murdaugh and Cory Howerton Fleming that includes four new charges against Murdaugh related to an alleged scheme to defraud multiple insurance companies in the course of surreptitiously delivering to Murdaugh a share of the proceeds.

A further round of superseding indictments against Murdaugh were issued in April 2022 involving four charges of conspiring with former banker Russell Lucius Laffitte, and former attorney Cory Howerton Fleming. On August 19, 2022, the State Grand Jury issued a new round of indictments against Murdaugh, Spencer Anwan Roberts, and Jerry K. Rivers. Murdaugh was indicted on nine charges related to the theft of $295,000 from his brother and his old law firm.

The indictments indicate he may have stolen nearly $8.8 million from more than a dozen people. The indictments allege crimes back to at least 2011. Murdaugh would secretly negotiate a settlement for his clients, then pay them only enough so they would be content and thankful; he would then steal the rest. His clients were usually minorities who were not well off. They included an injured state trooper, a deaf quadriplegic, a widower, an immigrant, several minors and even dead people. Murdaugh allegedly used money orders given to an unnamed family member to help launder the cash. Although some of the amounts to Fleming and Laffitte overlap as to the alleged amounts for Murdaugh, the State Grand Jury indicted Fleming on 23 charges for schemes to defraud victims of over $3.7 million. Laffitte had 21 charges against him for schemes to defraud victims of over $1.8 million. On September 14, 2023, Cory Fleming was sentenced to 13 years in prison for his role in stealing the insurance policy settlement. In August, Russell Laffitte was sentenced to seven years in prison for his role in stealing money from insurance settlements.

Under a plea deal, the indictments were reduced from 101 to 22, and were to be tried in state court. On November 17, 2023, Murdaugh pleaded guilty to all 22 of the charges in the state indictment. On November 29, 2023, he was sentenced to 27 years in prison for the state financial crimes.

===== Federal indictment, 22 counts =====
On May 24, 2023, the US Attorney's Office, District of South Carolina announced that a federal grand jury returned an indictment of 22 counts for money laundering, wire fraud, bank fraud and conspiracy to commit wire fraud and bank fraud for a total of $12,425,254.32. As part of a plea deal with federal prosecutors, they chose 22 charges that were most representative of the victims.

As part of the plea deal, Murdaugh was to face up to 30 years in federal prison to be served concurrently with his state conviction on the same charges. The plea deal required he "be truthful" with prosecutors. Days before his sentencing, DOJ prosecutors posted a new court filing saying that Alex had failed a polygraph test, and an additional $1.3m in stolen money and a further 11 victims were discovered since the plea deal was made. Nevertheless, the plea deal was retained, but with the new victims the prison sentence was increased.

On April 1, 2024, Murdaugh was sentenced to 40 years in federal prison for his financial fraud crimes, to run concurrently with the 27 years for state financial crimes. He is also to pay reparations of $8.7 million to the known 25 victims. There is a Federal mandatory minimum of 85% or exactly 34 years even with perfect conduct. Murdaugh began serving time on October 14, 2021 when he was 53 years old.

== Media portrayals ==
The family and the criminal case against Alex Murdaugh have been the subject of several documentaries, docuseries, and podcasts. Some notable examples include:

- Murdaugh Murders Podcast (2021; Liz Farrell & Mandy Matney)
- The Murdaugh Dynasty (2022; Campfire Studios / HBO Max)
- The Murdaugh Murders: Deadly Dynasty (2022; Investigation Discovery)
- Murdaugh Murders: A Southern Scandal (2023; Netflix)
- Murdaugh Murders: The Movie (2023; Lifetime)
- Murdaugh: Death in the Family (2025; Hulu)
- InstaDoc: Alex Murdaugh, Unconvicted (2026; Netflix)

== Family tree ==
The family tree is as follows:

- Lazurus Brown Murdaugh (1774–1830)
  - Josiah Putnam Murdaugh (1793–1882) m. Mary Ursula Varn
    - Josiah Putnam Murdaugh II (1830–1912) m. Annie Marvin Davis
      - Randolph Murdaugh Sr. (1887–1940) m. Etta Harvey in 1914
        - Randolph "Buster" Murdaugh Jr. (1915–1998) m. Gladys Marvin
          - Randolph Murdaugh III (1939–2021) m. Elizabeth "Libby" Alexander in 1961
            - Lynn Murdaugh (b. 1963) m. Allen Goettee
            - Randolph "Randy" Murdaugh IV (b. 1966) m. Christy Michele Miley
            - Richard Alexander "Alex" Murdaugh (b. 1968) m. Margaret Kennedy "Maggie" Branstetter
              - Richard Alexander "Buster" Murdaugh Jr. (b. 1996)
              - Paul Terry Murdaugh (1999–2021)
            - John Marvin Murdaugh (b. 1970) m. Elizabeth Anne "Liz" Arnett in 2008
        - John Glen "Johnny" Murdaugh (1918–1987) m. Maryland Russell

== See also ==
- Trial of Alex Murdaugh – 2023 murder trial in South Carolina, US
