= Colleton County Courthouse =

- U.S. National Register of Historic Places
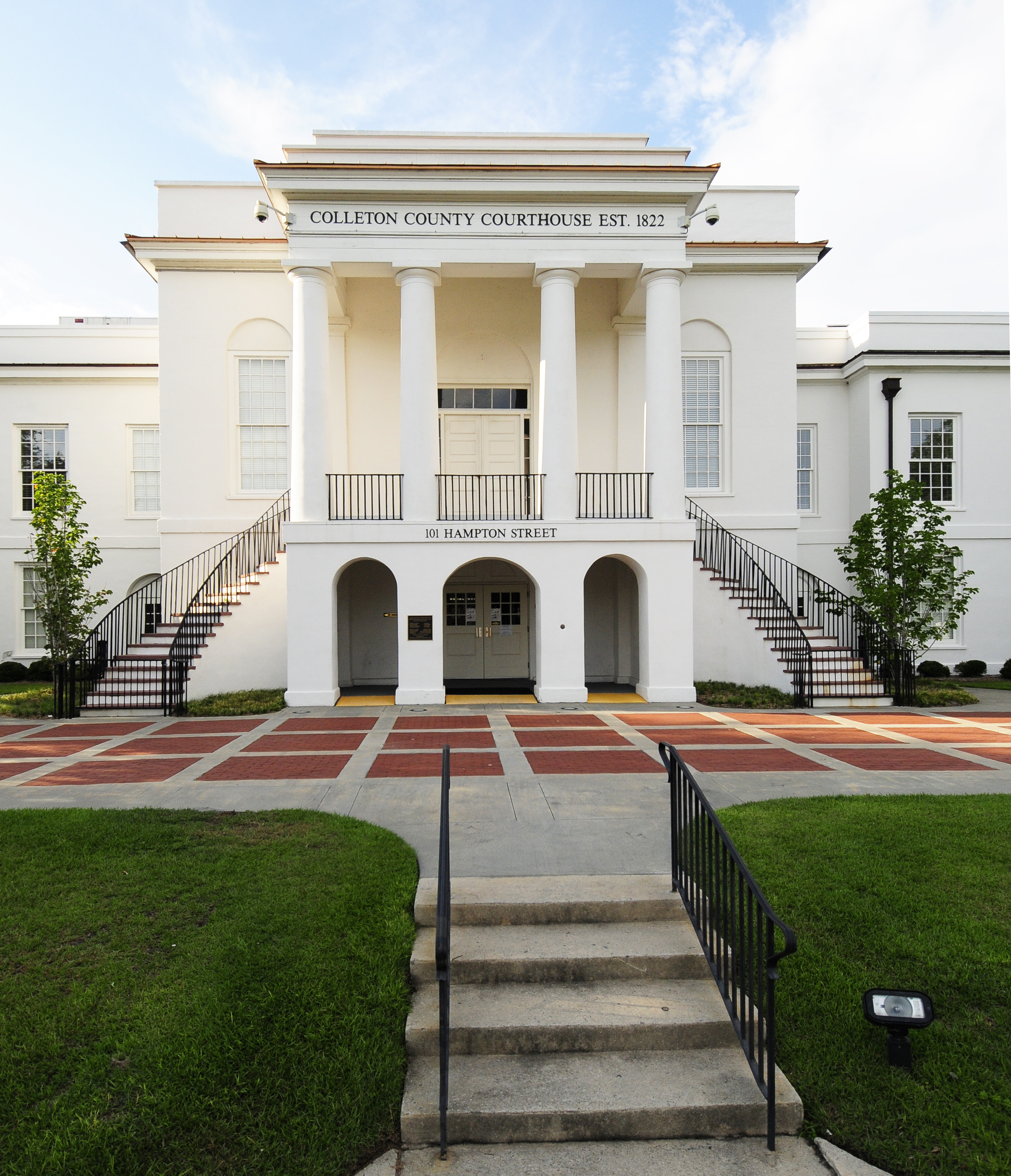
- The front of the building

- Location within South Carolina Location within the United States
- Interactive map showing the location of Colleton County Courthouse
- Location: Corner of Hampton and Jeffries Sts., Walterboro, South Carolina
- Coordinates: 32°54′08.86″N 80°40′00″W
- Built: 1820
- Architect: Robert Mills
- Architectural style: Greek Revival architecture
- NRHP reference No.: 71000765
- Added to NRHP: May 14, 1971

The Colleton County Courthouse was built in 1820. It was listed on the National Register of Historic Places in 1971. The building is located corner of Jeffries and Hampton Streets in Walterboro, South Carolina. The building was put on the register as an example of Greek Revival architecture and also due to its historical significance, since the first meeting on nullification was held in the building in 1828.

== History ==
In 1817, Walterboro became the seat of Colleton County. The design of the courthouse is attributed to the architect Robert Mills. The building was completed in 1820 by Charleston contractors, J. & B. Lucas.

In June 1828, Robert Rhett, participating in the first meeting on nullification, which was held in the courthouse building, delivered a speech which urged John Taylor, the governor of South Carolina, to immediately convene a session of the state legislature. Another nullification meeting was held in October of the same year.

In 2023, the courthouse was the venue for the Trial of Alex Murdaugh.

== Architecture ==
The courthouse building has two storeys and is made of brick. The entrance is built as a portico with four Tuscan columns and two staircases with ironwork railings. The courtroom is located in the second floor. The basement is raised.

The original building from 1820 was considerably altered in 1939, when two wings were built.
