= George Warren (South Carolina politician) =

South Carolina man (1887–1961)

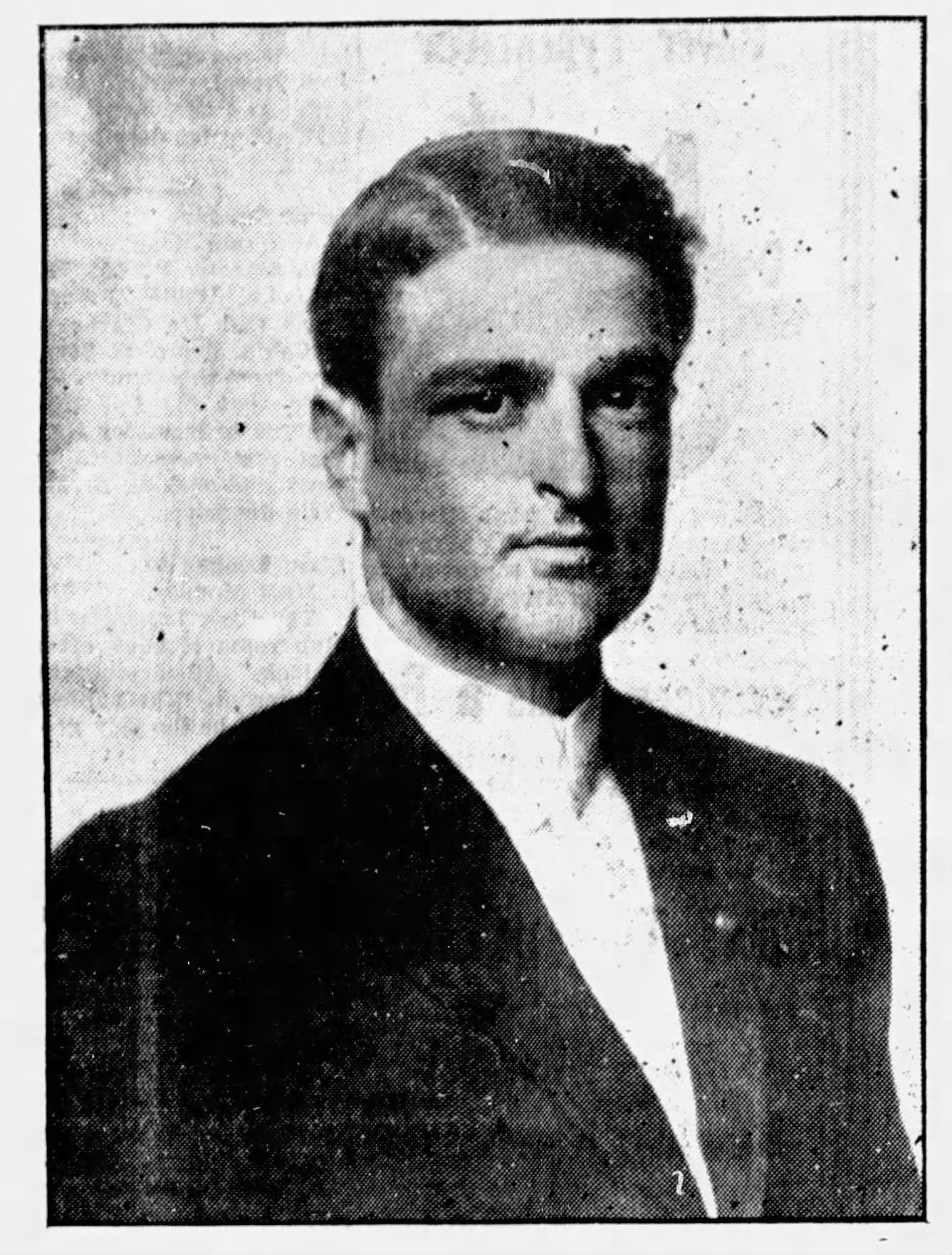
- George Warren in a campaign advertisement for his 1916 campaign

Member of the South Carolina Senate
- In office 1938–1950

1st Circuit solicitor for the 14th judicial district of South Carolina
- In office 1916–1920
- Preceded by: Office established
- Succeeded by: Randolph Murdaugh Sr.

Member of the South Carolina House of Representatives
- In office 1912–1916

Personal details
- Born: November 25, 1887 Brunson, South Carolina
- Died: August 31, 1961 (aged 73)
- Political party: Democratic Party
- Education: Clemson College
- Known for: 1st circuit solicitor of South Carolina's 14th judicial district; legislation to create 14th judicial district

George Warren (November 25, 1887 – August 31, 1961) was an American attorney and politician who served in the South Carolina legislature and as the 1st circuit solicitor for the 14th judicial district of South Carolina between 1916 and 1920.

== Education and personal life ==
George Warren was born November 25, 1887, in Brunson, South Carolina in Hampton County, the son of attorney Jeff Warren and Clara Eloise Riley. He attended Morrison's Academy in Estill, South Carolina for his primary education and then graduated from Clemson College in 1908. He studied law under his uncle, attorney Major Frank Warren and was admitted to the bar in 1909. In 1911 he married Rita Louise Lightsey and they had two children before she died in 1918.

== Career ==
Warren served in the South Carolina House of Representatives between 1912 and 1916. During that time, he helped pass legislation to create the 14th judicial district. In 1916, instead of running for re-election, he successfully ran for the new open Circuit solicitor seat. He served one term and retired to run for the U.S. Senate in 1920. Although his U.S. Senate campaign failed, he remained active in politics. He was a presidential elector in 1928, president of the South Carolina Democratic Party State Convention in 1940, and the 1948–49 president of the South Carolina Bar Association. He returned to the South Carolina Legislature and served in the South Carolina Senate from 1938 until his retirement in 1950. Warren was a supporter of the Dixiecrats.

== Death ==
Warren died on August 31, 1961.
