= Murdaugh Murders: A Southern Scandal =

2023 true crime television series

- Genre: True crime; Docuseries
- Directed by: Jenner Furst; Julia Willoughby Nason
- Starring: Morgan Doughty; Miley Altman; Connor Cook; Anthony Cook
- No. of seasons: 2
- No. of episodes: 6

Production
- Running time: 33–51 minutes

Original release
- Network: Netflix
- Release: February 22 – September 20, 2023

Murdaugh Murders: A Southern Scandal is a true crime television series. The series covers the Murdaugh family and the events surrounding the trial of Alex Murdaugh, beginning with the death of Mallory Beach. It was released on Netflix on February 22, 2023. The second season released on September 20, 2023. The series received generally positive reviews from critics.

== Episodes ==
Series overview
Season	Episodes	Originally released
1	3	February 22, 2023
2	3	September 20, 2023

=== Season 1 (2023) ===
No. overall	No. in season	Title	Directed by	Written by	Original release date
1	1	"Where is Mallory?"	Jenner Furst & Julia Willoughby Nason	Rachel Bozich	February 22, 2023
2	2	"Murders at Moselle"	Jenner Furst & Julia Willoughby Nason	Rachel Bozich	February 22, 2023
3	3	"No Secrets Are Safe"	Jenner Furst & Julia Willoughby Nason	Rachel Bozich	February 22, 2023

=== Season 2 (2023) ===
No. overall	No. in season	Title	Directed by	Written by	Original release date
4	1	"A Normal Day"	Michael Gasparro & Julia Willoughby Nason	Rachel Bozich	September 20, 2023
5	2	"Alex's Alibi"	Michael Gasparro & Julia Willoughby Nason	Rachel Bozich	September 20, 2023
6	3	"A Tangled Web We Weave"	Michael Gasparro & Julia Willoughby Nason	Rachel Bozich	September 20, 2023

== Reception ==
On Rotten Tomatoes, the series has an approval rating of 82% based on eleven reviews and an average rating of 6.4/10.

Brian Lowry of CNN stated that the show "has a slapdash feel from beginning to end, and finds the younger contingent, especially, to be poor narrators of what transpired."

Polly Conway of Common Sense Media rated the series three out of five stars, calling it "a compelling watch." Kayla Cobb of Decider described the series as "a somewhat concise guide to the murder charges around Alex Murdaugh", but noted that "there are better options out there."
