= Randolph Murdaugh III =

South Carolina solicitor (1939–2021)

4th circuit solicitor for the 14th judicial district of South Carolina
- In office 1986–2006
- Preceded by: Randolph Murdaugh Jr.
- Succeeded by: Duffie Stone

Personal details
- Born: October 25, 1939 Savannah, Georgia
- Died: June 10, 2021 (aged 81) Varnville, South Carolina
- Resting place: Hampton Cemetery
- Spouse: Elizabeth Alexander
- Children: 4, including Alex
- Parent: Randolph Murdaugh Jr. (father)
- Relatives: Randolph Murdaugh Sr. (grandfather)
- Education: University of South Carolina (BS, LLB)
- Known for: 3rd-generation patriarch of Murdaugh family
- Awards: Order of the Palmetto

Randolph Murdaugh III (October 25, 1939 – June 10, 2021) was an American attorney who served as the circuit solicitor of South Carolina's 14th judicial district from 1986 until 2006. The Murdaugh family had held the office since Randolph Murdaugh Sr.'s election in 1920; Randolph III was the last Murdaugh to hold the office. He was the third patriarch of the Murdaugh family from the 1980s until he died in 2021.

== Early life and education ==
Randolph Murdaugh III was born October 25, 1939, in Savannah, Georgia, the son of Randolph Murdaugh Jr. and Gladys Marvin. Murdaugh graduated from Wade Hampton High School in 1957, the University of South Carolina with a Bachelor of Science in business administration in 1961, and the University of South Carolina School of Law in 1964.

== Circuit solicitor ==
Murdaugh succeeded his father, Randolph Murdaugh Jr., as circuit solicitor of South Carolina's 14th judicial district in 1986. He was president of the South Carolina Solicitor's Association between 1995 and 1996 and served on the National District Attorney's Association Board of Directors between 1998 and 2005. He ran unopposed for all five of his terms and held office until retiring in 2006. He was succeeded by Duffie Stone.

== Retirement and private practice ==
After retiring from public office, he returned to private practice at his family's law firm. In 2019, Murdaugh was awarded the Order of the Palmetto, South Carolina's highest civilian recognition, by Governor Henry McMaster.

== Personal life, family, and death ==
Murdaugh was married to Elizabeth Alexander and had four children including three sons, Randolph IV (called Randy) and Richard Alexander (called Alex; b. May 27, 1968), both of whom entered the family firm; and John Marvin. Murdaugh died of natural causes on June 10, 2021, three days after his son Alex allegedly murdered his wife, Margaret and his son, Paul. He was buried at Hampton Cemetery.
