= South Carolina Circuit Court =

U.S. state court

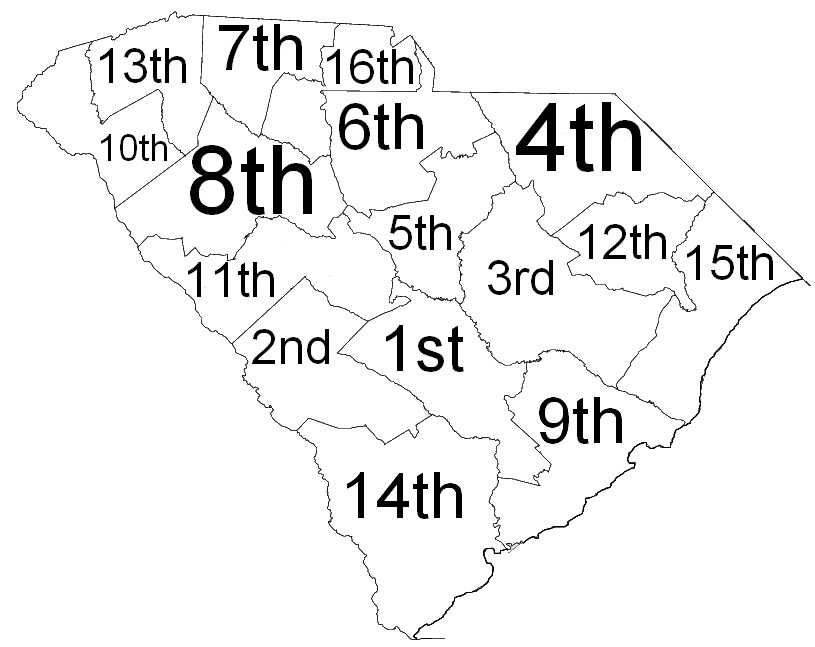
Circuits map

The South Carolina Circuit Court is the state court of general jurisdiction of the U.S. state of South Carolina. It consists of a civil division (the Court of Common Pleas) and a criminal division (the Court of General Sessions).

The Circuit Court is the state trial court of general jurisdiction in South Carolina. It is also a superior court, having limited appellate jurisdiction over appeals from the lower Probate Court, Magistrate's Court, and Municipal Court.

South Carolina's 46 counties are divided into 16 judicial circuits:

- First Circuit – Calhoun, Orangeburg, Dorchester
- Second Circuit – Aiken, Barnwell, Bamberg
- Third Circuit – Lee, Sumter, Clarendon, Williamsburg
- Fourth Circuit – Dillon, Chesterfield, Darlington, Marlboro
- Fifth Circuit – Kershaw, Richland
- Sixth Circuit – Chester, Fairfield, Lancaster
- Seventh Circuit – Cherokee, Spartanburg
- Eighth Circuit – Abbeville, Newberry, Laurens, Greenwood
- Ninth Circuit – Berkeley, Charleston
- Tenth Circuit – Oconee, Anderson
- Eleventh Circuit – McCormick, Edgefield, Lexington, Saluda
- Twelfth Circuit – Florence, Marion
- Thirteenth Circuit – Pickens, Greenville
- Fourteenth Circuit – Allendale, Colleton, Hampton, Beaufort, Jasper
- Fifteenth Circuit – Georgetown, Horry
- Sixteenth Circuit – York, Union

Each has at least one resident circuit judge who maintains an office in their home county within the circuit. There are currently 49 circuit judges who serve the 16 circuits on a rotating basis. Court terms and assignments determined by the Chief Justice based upon recommendations of Court Administration. Circuit court judges are elected by the South Carolina General Assembly to staggered terms of six years.

South Carolina has a statewide business court program within the circuit courts. This began as a pilot program in a limited number of circuits, created by a South Carolina Supreme Court administrative order in 2007, which the Supreme Court expanded statewide in 2014, and later made permanent in 2019.

Citizens of each circuit elect a circuit solicitor, equivalent to a district attorney in many other states. Assistant solicitors are then appointed by the solicitor.
