= National Register of Historic Places listings in Hampton County, South Carolina =

Location of Hampton County in South Carolina

This is a list of the National Register of Historic Places listings in Hampton County, South Carolina.

This is intended to be a complete list of the properties on the National Register of Historic Places in Hampton County, South Carolina, United States. The locations of National Register properties for which the latitude and longitude coordinates are included below, may be seen in a map.

There are 16 properties listed on the National Register in the county.

This National Park Service list is complete through NPS recent listings posted January 16, 2026.

== Current listings ==
	Name on the Register	Image	Date listed	Location	City or town	Description
1	American Legion Hut	American Legion Hut	October 27, 2000 (#00001235)	Junction of Hoover St. and Jackson Ave. 32°52′19″N 81°07′03″W	Hampton	
2	Bank of Hampton	Bank of Hampton	May 30, 2001 (#01000606)	15 Elm St., E. 32°51′59″N 81°06′31″W	Hampton	
3	Church of the Heavenly Rest		January 14, 2026 (#100012544)	152 Corley Road (CR S-25-194. sometimes called Collie or Corlie Rd.); 32°42′38″N 81°18′38″W	Estill vicinity	
4	Cohasset	Cohasset	July 24, 1986 (#86001935)	U.S. Route 601; 32°55′58″N 81°04′37″W	Crocketville	On private property, gated
5	Gifford Rosenwald School	Gifford Rosenwald School	October 4, 2017 (#100001720)	6146 Columbia Hwy. 32°51′50″N 81°14′17″W	Gifford	
6	Gravel Hill Plantation		May 10, 2010 (#10000240)	3954 Augusta Stage Coach Rd; 32°58′00″N 81°23′09″W	Garnett	
7	Hampton Colored School	Hampton Colored School	February 28, 1991 (#91000233)	W. Holly St. east of its junction with Hoover St. 32°52′04″N 81°07′15″W	Hampton	
8	Hampton County Courthouse	Hampton County Courthouse	December 12, 1978 (#78002517)	U.S. Route 278; 32°51′58″N 81°06′34″W	Hampton	
9	Hampton County Jail	Hampton County Jail	June 23, 2011 (#11000405)	702 1st St., W. 32°51′55″N 81°06′40″W	Hampton	Now the Hampton County Historical Society Museum
10	John Lawton House	John Lawton House	July 1, 2009 (#09000484)	118 3rd. St. on NRHP, now numbered 316; 32°45′14″N 81°14′22″W	Estill	
11	Lawtonville Baptist Church	Lawtonville Baptist Church	October 9, 2012 (#12000848)	194 E. 4th St; 32°45′18″N 81°14′18″W	Estill	
12	Oak Grove	Oak Grove	July 12, 1976 (#76001704)	Southwest of Brunson; 32°54′49″N 81°12′58″W	Brunson	
13	Palmetto Theatre	Palmetto Theatre	October 9, 2012 (#12000849)	109 Lee Ave. 32°52′06″N 81°06′25″W	Hampton	
14	Hattie J. Peeples House	Hattie J. Peeples House	October 13, 1992 (#92001299)	109 Carolina Ave., W. 32°51′02″N 81°04′53″W	Varnville	
15	The Pineland	The Pineland	July 8, 1999 (#99000814)	The Pineland Lane, off U.S. Route 321; 32°36′55″N 81°14′28″W	Garnett	
16	Stoney Creek Independent Presbyterian Chapel of Prince William Parish	Stoney Creek Independent Presbyterian Chapel of Prince William Parish	May 22, 2002 (#02000559)	McPhersonville; 32°41′31″N 80°54′53″W	McPhersonville	Also called the McPhersonville Church

== See also ==
- List of National Historic Landmarks in South Carolina
- National Register of Historic Places listings in South Carolina
