= Cohasset =

Cohasset can refer to:

== Places ==
- Cohasset, California
- Cohasset, Massachusetts
  - Cohasset (MBTA station)
  - Cohasset Rocks, an alternative name for Minots Ledge, a reef off of Cohasset, Massachusetts
- Cohasset, Minnesota
- Cohasset, Virginia
- Cohasett (Hampton County, South Carolina) - NRHP house in Hampton County
- Lake Cohasset, one of several reservoirs on the eponymous stream of Mill Creek Park in Youngstown, Ohio

== Ships ==
- USS Cohasset, three U.S. Navy ships

== Other uses ==
- Cohasset Punch, a brand of liqueur named for Cohasset, Massachusetts
