= Lake Warren State Park =

State park in South Carolina, United States

- Lake Warren
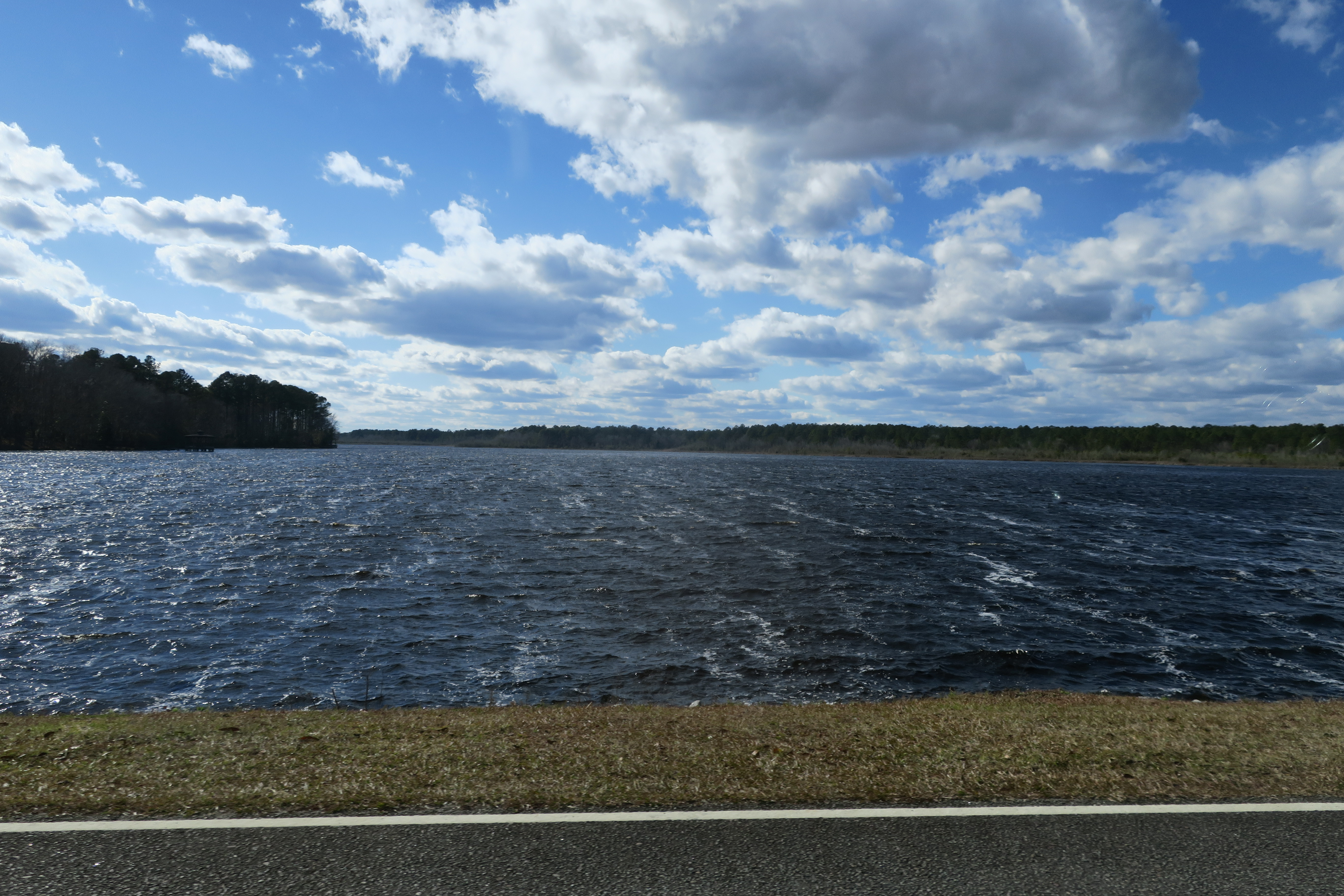
- Interactive map of Lake Warren State Park
- Type: state park
- Location: Hampton County, South Carolina (Lowcountry region)
- Nearest city: Hampton
- Coordinates: 32°50′19″N 81°19′25″W
- Area: 440-acre (1.8 km^{2})
- Elevation: 70 feet (21.3 m)
- Operator: South Carolina Department of Parks, Recreation & Tourism
- Camp sites: limited
- Hiking trails: Lowcountry discovery trail (1.1 mi); nature trail (0.3 mi)
- Other information: Free admission Hours: 9 a.m. to 6 p.m. Pets: allowed, must be leashed
- Website: http://www.southcarolinaparks.com/lakewarren/introduction.aspx

Lake Warren State Park is a 440-acre (1.8 km^{2}) state park located 4 miles (6.4 km) southwest of Hampton, South Carolina, United States. Its main attraction is Lake Warren itself, which is locally popular for fishing, boating, and bird-watching. An additional smaller pond, a playground, and picnic facilities are located within the park. Primarily used for daylight hours, camping is allowed but is restricted to primitive sites.
