= Fechtig, South Carolina =

- Unincorporated community
- Location within South Carolina Location within the United States
- Coordinates: 32°46′09″N 80°57′50″W
- Country: United States
- State: South Carolina
- County: Hampton
- Elevation: 85 ft (26 m)
- Time zone: UTC-5 (Eastern (EST))
  - Summer (DST): UTC-4 (EDT)
- Area codes: 803 & 839
- GNIS feature ID: 1222364

Fechtig is an unincorporated community in Hampton County, South Carolina, United States. The community is on South Carolina Highway 68 12 miles (19 km) southeast of Hampton.

On April 13, 2020, a tornado measuring EF4 on the Enhanced Fujita Scale traveled across Hampton County from near Scotia to near Fechtig. The tornado was part of the 2020 Easter tornado outbreak.
