= Hampton County Jail =

Historic jail in South Carolina, US

- U.S. National Register of Historic Places
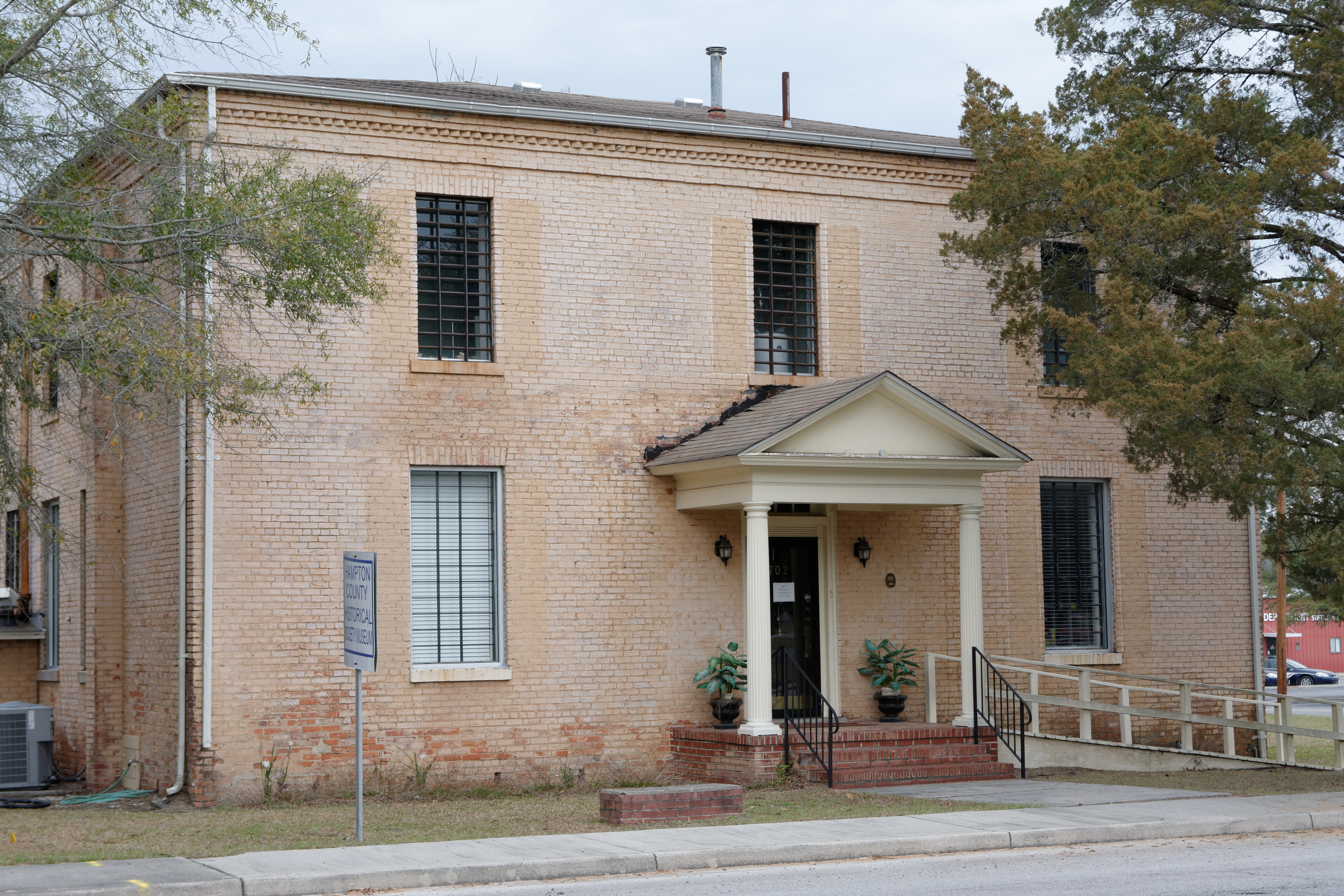
- The jail in 2017

- Location within South Carolina Location within the United States
- Location: 702 1st St West., Hampton, South Carolina
- Coordinates: 32.86542°N 81.11127°W
- Area: less than one acre
- Built: 1879-1880
- NRHP reference No.: 11000405
- Added to NRHP: June 23, 2011

Hampton County Jail, also known as Old Hampton County Jail and Hampton County Museum, is a historic jail located at Hampton, Hampton County, South Carolina. It was built in 1879–1880, and is a two-story, three-bay-wide brick building, with a central, one-story entry portico on the front facade. The jailkeeper's living quarters occupied the first floor, while the second floor was dedicated to the cellblocks. The jail was dramatically altered about 1925, and a third time in the 1960s. The jail was the only holding facility for newly arrested persons in Hampton County until it closed in 1976.

The building is now home to the Hampton County Museum. Exhibits include local history, a general store display, military artifacts from many wars, agriculture, Native Americans, natural history and daily life.

It was listed on the National Register of Historic Places in 2012.
