= Early Branch, South Carolina =

- Unincorporated community
- Location within South Carolina Location within the United States
- Coordinates: 32°44′45″N 80°55′40″W
- Country: United States
- State: South Carolina
- County: Hampton
- Elevation: 69 ft (21 m)
- Time zone: UTC-5 (Eastern (EST))
  - Summer (DST): UTC-4 (EDT)
- ZIP code: 29916
- Area codes: 803, 839
- GNIS feature ID: 1231252

Early Branch is an unincorporated community in Hampton County, South Carolina, United States. The community is located along South Carolina Highway 68, 14 miles (23 km) southeast of Hampton. Early Branch has a post office with ZIP code 29916.
