= Hugh Bryan =

Hugh Bryan (1699–1753) was an evangelical Christian and prominent white planter in the colony of South Carolina who mounted a brief but fiery challenge to the Anglican establishment and slaveholding hegemony. In 1742 he publicly stated and wrote that slavery was a sin and that God's punishment was evident and imminent. A Grand Jury indicted him for fomenting slave rebellion, a capital offense. Bryan recanted and apologized. He continued to support and promote the literacy of enslaved African Americans and their conversion to Christianity. He was a founder of the first non-Anglican church in South Carolina, the Stoney Creek Independent Presbyterian Chapel of Prince William Parish, in which both black and white worshippers were members. Andrew Bryan, an enslaved African American who worked for Hugh's brother, Jonathan, was among the worshippers. Andrew Bryan founded the First Bryan Baptist Church in Savannah.

== Origin and family ==
Bryan was born near Pocotaligo in 1699. He was second of four children of Janet Cochran and Joseph Bryan, who had emigrated from Hereford in 1680. The first, also named Joseph, was born in 1697, Hannah in 1706, and Jonathan in 1708. Janet Cochran died three weeks after Jonathan was born.

Hugh Bryan inherited the family's holdings in 1735. The Bryans raised beef, rice, and indigo on plantations and operated ferries in the southeastern corner of the colony of South Carolina.

Hugh Bryan married three times. His first wife is unnamed and her date of death unknown. His second wife was Catherine Barnwell, who died in 1740. She was the daughter of John Barnwell. His third wife was Mary Prioleau, who survived Bryan, and married his friend William Hutson in 1758. Hugh Bryan had at least one daughter, who was a married adult in 1741, when he wrote a letter to her. He also had at least one son, to whom he addressed two letters in 1740 while the son was attending school in Charleston. In 1751 he wrote in his diary that he visited a daughter's grave.

== Captured during Yemassee War ==
In 1715 Bryan was taken captive in the Yamasee War and enslaved by a leader of one of the native American groups who were fighting the English settlers. Bryan was taken to St. Augustine and held for a year before he was released. During his captivity he was provided with a Bible and a book by William Beveridge (bishop). Bryan later wrote that these works made him receptive to the religious ideas of dissenters and George Whitefield.

== Participation in colonial affairs ==
In 1733 Bryan was elected to the Royal Assembly. In 1735-37 he held positions of authority in St. Helena parish. Bryan was involved in defense of the colony, which was under threat from the Spanish and Native Americans, some of whom joined with the Spanish to try to prevent the English from taking control of more land. He and Nathaniel Barnwell (who was to become his brother-in-law) petitioned the assembly for funds to build a fort to provide refuge from a sea attack, and Bryan took it upon himself to outfit a scout boat.

== Religious experiences and conversion ==
In 1735, Hugh Bryan delivered cattle to Salzburger emigrants in Georgia, a colony founded as a refuge for dissenters. He returned several times to deliver more supplies and stayed to socialize and discuss religion. In 1739 George Whitefield, the revivalist instrumental in the First Great Awakening, began preaching in South Carolina and Georgia. Whitefield's preaching converted Bryan's wife, Catherine. At her urging, Bryan met with Whitefield in the summer of 1739 and began to struggle with his own faith. Catherine attributed her recovery from a serious disease to her faith, and Hugh himself, after agonized self-criticism, declared that he, too, had been "born again" into faith.

== Warning of God's wrath directed at slaveholders ==
Several events in 1739 and 1740 convinced Bryan that God was punishing white Christians for their treatment of their enslaved workers. In the summer and fall of 1739 an epidemic of yellow fever ravaged the populace. That September slaves digging drainage channels near the Stono River, about twenty miles from Charleston, broke into a warehouse seeking food at the end of a long day of heavy labor. They killed two white men in the store, took their weapons, and killed about two dozen more white people before they were caught. In 1740 a fast-moving fire destroyed hundreds of buildings in Charleston.

Bryan believed that the wrath of God would continue to rain until slaveholders mended their ways, and he felt obligated to warn other members of his class. He wrote a letter to the South-Carolina Gazette warning of severe judgments from God. He accused secular authorities and the clergy of negligence and worse and exhorted them to repent or face "more terrible Vials of [God's] Wrath." Whitefield had helped him write the letter, and both men were arrested and then released without being charged.

Bryan had begun to gather slaves regularly on his property for worship services and he continued to do so, although it was illegal and alarmed his white neighbors and other members of planter society. Then in early 1741 he wrote a twenty-page letter to the speaker of the Commons House of Assembly in which he prophesied that God was going to destroy Charleston and free the slaves to punish white society. A grand jury indicted him for fomenting slave rebellion and warrants were issued for his arrest.

No arrest took place, because Jonathan Bryan reported that Hugh had recovered his senses. Hugh subsequently wrote a letter of apology to the Commons House. According to Jonathan, "The Invisible Spirit" had directed Hugh to obtain a rod and "smite the Waters of the River, which should thereby be divided, so as he might go over on dry Ground." Jonathan found Hugh "smiting, splashing and spluttering the Water about with it, till he was quite up to the Chinn." Hugh believed that he would die if he went to sleep without parting the waters, but Jonathan convinced him to go home and go to bed. When he awoke and found himself alive he became convinced that the "spirit" had been a delusion of Satan. Hugh Bryan's letter to the commons house confirmed as much.

The actions of Hugh Bryan, called sarcastically "the grand Prophet," were used by the Anglican establishment to warn of the dangers of "excessive religious enthusiasm" and to discredit Whitefield in particular and revivalist fervor in general.

Though Bryan recanted and resumed his place in the white planter class, he did not back down from his belief that he owed a duty to the souls of enslaved people, and he and Jonathan continued to support their education and their gathering to worship.

== Education of enslaved workers and foundational churches ==
Whitefield supported the institution of slavery, but he chastised white society for their treatment of enslaved people and preached that slaveholders were condemning their own souls for failing to give their slaves the opportunity to be saved. In the wake of his ministry enslaved African Americans converted to Christianity in large numbers for the first time. Hugh Bryan hired a tutor, William Hutson, to teach the slaves on his plantation. Hugh and Jonathan Bryan both encouraged African American preachers and arranged for slaves to attend worship services and to form their own congregations. The Bryans founded on their property the first non-Anglican church in South Carolina, which became the Stoney Creek Independent Presbyterian Chapel of Prince William Parish, where blacks and whites worshipped together.

After the death of Hugh Bryan, his brother Jonathan continued to promote education of enslaved workers and their participation in revival Christianity. Jonathan encouraged his servant Andrew Bryan, who was converted by the free black preacher George Liele, to travel and preach on his own, particularly to and with the congregation of the African American Silver Bluff Baptist Church, founded in 1750. With a legacy from Jonathan, Andrew Bryan bought his freedom and land to build a church in Savannah, which became the First Bryan Baptist Church.
