= Gifford Rosenwald School =

Historic school in South Carolina, US

- U.S. National Register of Historic Places
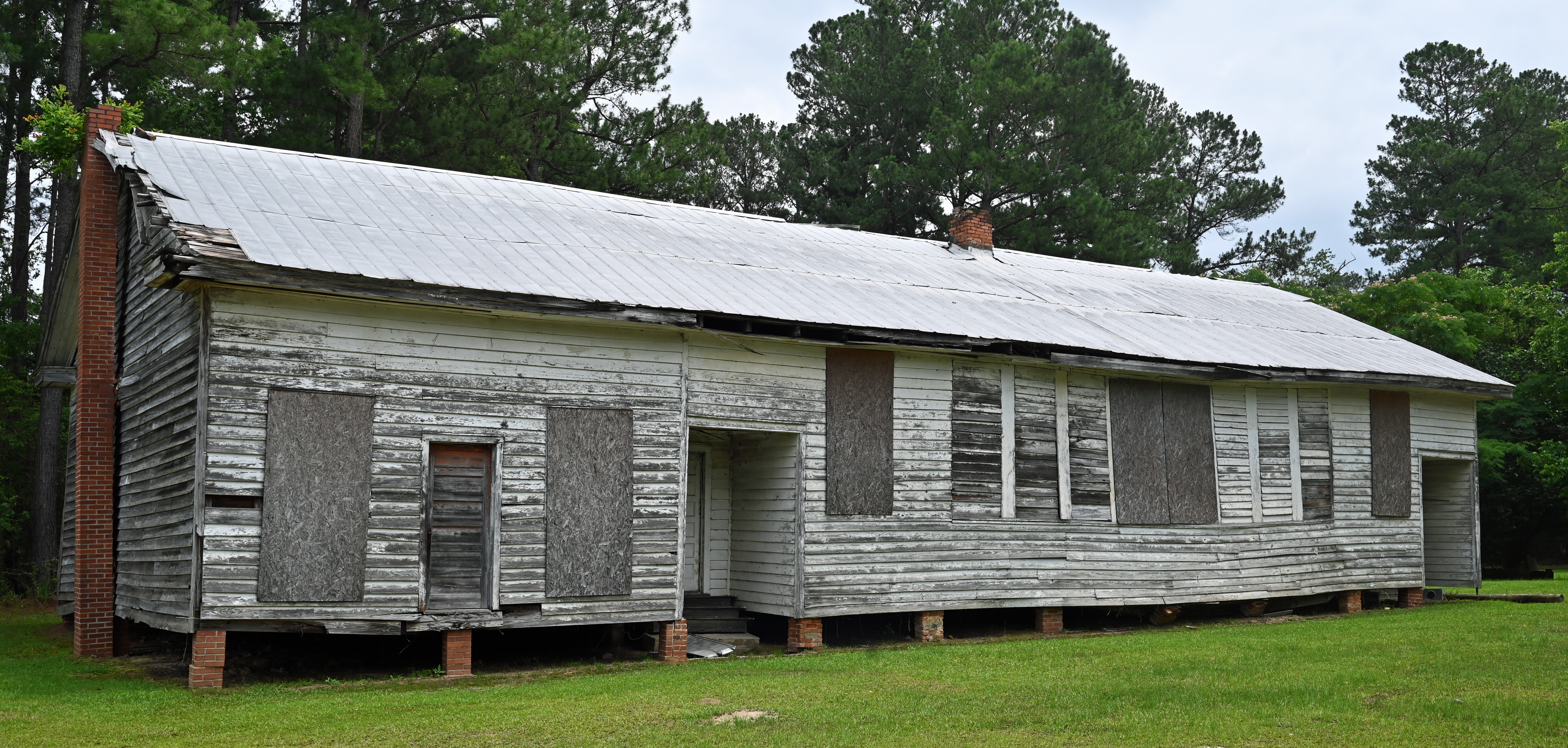

- Location within South Carolina Location within the United States
- Location: 6146 Columbia Hwy., Gifford, South Carolina
- Coordinates: 32°51′50″N 81°14′17″W
- Built: 1920
- NRHP reference No.: 100001720
- Added to NRHP: October 4, 2017

The Gifford Rosenwald School is a historic school building at 6146 Columbia Highway in Gifford, South Carolina. It was built in 1920 with funding from the Rosenwald Fund for the education of African Americans. Its design is not based on standard Rosenwald plans, but on a standard two-room plan published by state Board of Education. Originally segregated to African Americans it was integrated in 1958.

The building was listed on the National Register of Historic Places in 2017.

== See also ==
- National Register of Historic Places listings in Hampton County, South Carolina
