= Gifford, South Carolina =

- Town
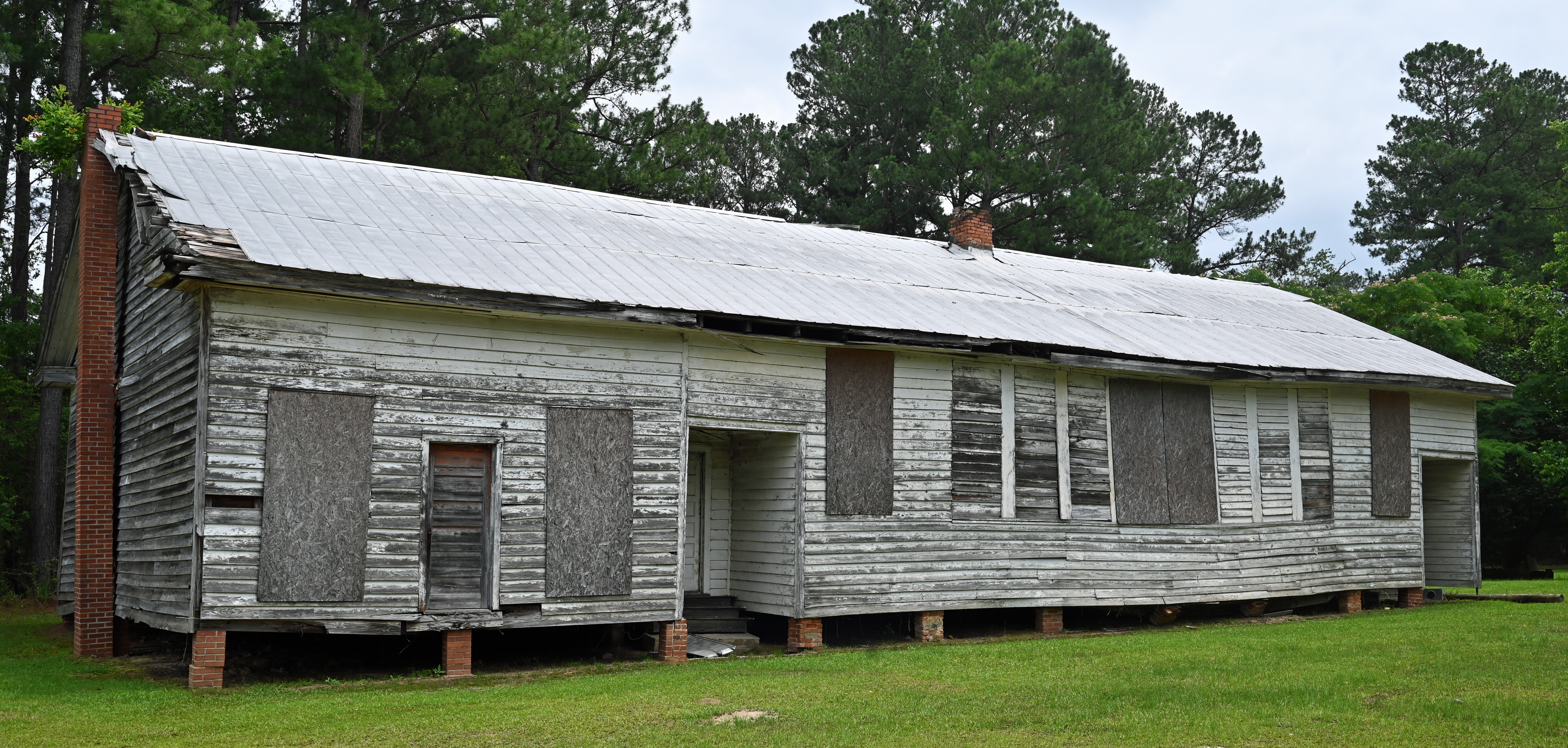
- The Gifford Rosenwald School

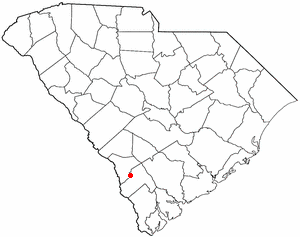
- Location of Gifford, South Carolina
- Coordinates: 32°51′47″N 81°14′35″W
- Country: United States
- State: South Carolina
- County: Hampton

Area
  - Total: 0.97 sq mi (2.50 km^{2})
  - Land: 0.97 sq mi (2.50 km^{2})
  - Water: 0 sq mi (0.00 km^{2})
- Elevation: 135 ft (41 m)

Population (2020)
  - Total: 257
  - Density: 265.8/sq mi (102.61/km^{2})
- Time zone: UTC-5 (Eastern (EST))
  - Summer (DST): UTC-4 (EDT)
- ZIP code: 29923
- Area codes: 803, 839
- FIPS code: 45-29005
- GNIS feature ID: 2406566
- Website: www.facebook.com/p/Town-of-Gifford-100072382056556/

Gifford is a town in Hampton County, South Carolina, United States. As of the 2020 census, Gifford had a population of 257.

== Geography ==
Gifford is located in northwestern Hampton County. U.S. Route 321 (Columbia Highway) passes through the center of town, leading north 7 miles (11 km) to Fairfax and south 3 miles (5 km) to Luray. Hampton, the county seat, is 9 miles (14 km) to the east, and Columbia, the state capital, is 84 miles (135 km) to the north.

According to the United States Census Bureau, the town of Gifford has a total area of 0.97 square miles (2.5 km^{2}), all land.

== Demographics ==
Historical population
Census	Pop.	Note	%±
1980	385		—
1990	313		−18.7%
2000	370		18.2%
2010	288		−22.2%
2020	257		−10.8%
U.S. Decennial Census

=== 2020 census ===
Gifford town, South Carolina – Racial and ethnic composition Note: the US Census treats Hispanic/Latino as an ethnic category. This table excludes Latinos from the racial categories and assigns them to a separate category. Hispanics/Latinos may be of any race.
Race / Ethnicity (NH = Non-Hispanic)	Pop 2000	Pop 2010	Pop 2020	% 2000	% 2010	% 2020
White alone (NH)	23	12	13	6.22%	4.17%	5.06%
Black or African American alone (NH)	343	271	237	92.70%	94.10%	92.22%
Native American or Alaska Native alone (NH)	0	0	0	0.00%	0.00%	0.00%
Asian alone (NH)	0	0	1	0.00%	0.00%	0.39%
Native Hawaiian or Pacific Islander alone (NH)	0	0	0	0.00%	0.00%	0.00%
Other race alone (NH)	0	1	0	0.00%	0.35%	0.00%
Mixed race or Multiracial (NH)	4	4	1	1.08%	1.39%	0.39%
Hispanic or Latino (any race)	0	0	5	0.00%	0.00%	1.95%
Total	370	288	257	100.00%	100.00%	100.00%

=== 2000 census ===
As of the census of 2000, there were 370 people, 123 households, and 87 families residing in the town. The population density was 393.0 inhabitants per square mile (151.7/km^{2}). There were 146 housing units at an average density of 155.1 per square mile (59.9/km^{2}). The racial makeup of the town was 6.22% White, 92.70% African American, and 1.08% from two or more races.

There were 123 households, out of which 34.1% had children under the age of 18 living with them, 35.8% were married couples living together, 30.1% had a female householder with no husband present, and 28.5% were non-families. 24.4% of all households were made up of individuals, and 6.5% had someone living alone who was 65 years of age or older. The average household size was 3.01 and the average family size was 3.67.

In the town, the population was spread out, with 36.5% under the age of 18, 10.0% from 18 to 24, 25.1% from 25 to 44, 20.0% from 45 to 64, and 8.4% who were 65 years of age or older. The median age was 27 years. For every 100 females, there were 86.9 males. For every 100 females age 18 and over, there were 75.4 males.

The median income for a household in the town was $18,375, and the median income for a family was $23,750. Males had a median income of $20,250 versus $16,364 for females. The per capita income for the town was $7,602. About 26.7% of families and 37.9% of the population were below the poverty line, including 47.8% of those under age 18 and 45.5% of those age 65 or over.
