= Cohasett (Hampton County, South Carolina) =

Historic house in South Carolina, United States

- Cohasset
- U.S. National Register of Historic Places
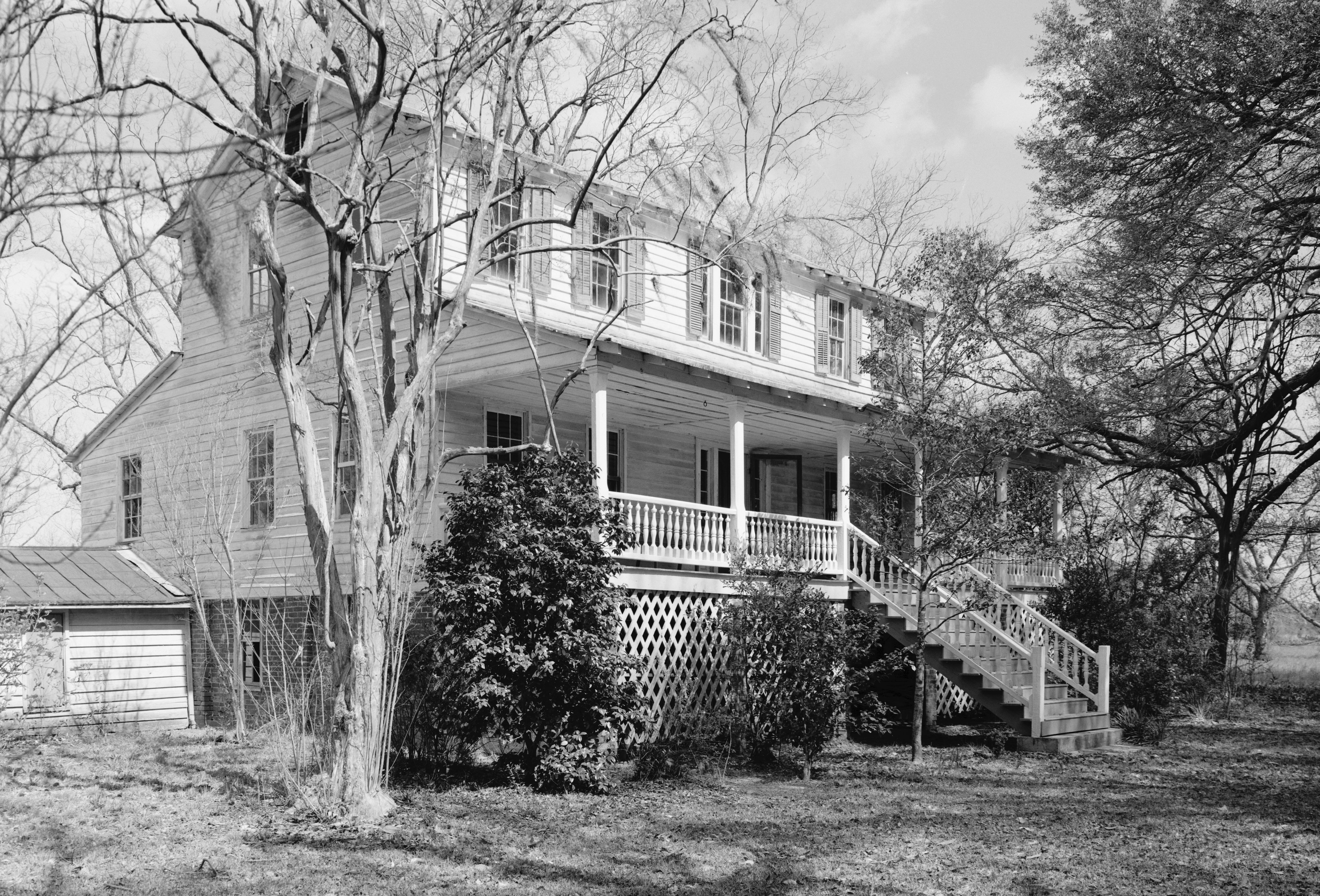
- Cohasset

- Location within South Carolina Location within the United States
- Nearest city: Hampton, South Carolina
- Coordinates: 32.93269°N 81.07694°W
- Built: 1873
- Architectural style: Carolina I-house
- NRHP reference No.: 86001935
- Added to NRHP: July 24, 1986

Cohasset is a house in northeastern Hampton County, South Carolina about 5 mi (8 km) north of Hampton, South Carolina near the unincorporated community of Crocketville. It was built about 1873. It is north of U.S. Route 601. It was named to the National Register of Historic Places on July 24, 1986.

== History ==
The house was built by William James Gooding in northern Beaufort District prior to the formation of Hampton County. Gooding was a farmer and also held a number of political offices including a representative from Beaufort District to the South Carolina General Assembly, sheriff of Beaufort District, treasurer of Beaufort County, and treasurer of Hampton County. In 1879 by the end of Reconstruction and the slave labor system, he had 100 acres (40 ha) under cultivation out of 950 acres (384 ha). He grew cotton, corn, sweet potatoes, oats, rice, and sugar cane. Tenants also cultivated some of his land.

== Architecture ==
It is a two-story weatherboarded Carolina I-house with a side-gabled roof. It was built from pine grown on the farm and sawed in Gooding's sawmill. The house has a raised basement with brick foundation in common bond with Flemish bond stenciling. It has two interior, corbeled chimneys. A one-story, shed roof porch extends across the front facade. The porch has six solid posts and a railing with turned balusters.

The front elevation has five bays with the center door with sidelights and two six over six lights on each side. The second story has five six over six lights. The center window has sidelights. There are louvered shutters on the windows of the first and second floors. The raised basement has a center door with sidelights and four over four lights aligned with those on the main level. These windows have batten shutters.

There is a one-story gable-roofed appendage perpendicular to the left elevation at the basement level that serves as the kitchen. On the rear elevation at the main level, there is a one-story, shed roof appendage with a center porch flanked by enclosed rooms.

The interior plan is one room deep, two rooms wide characteristic of an I-house. The two rooms on the first floor are on either side of a central hall. There are two small service rooms behind the main rooms. The basement has brick paver flooring and low ceilings. The two rooms on this level are the dining room and a quilting room. They have plain mantels and horizontal flushboard paneling. The second floor has a small room opposite the central window.

The house is an excellent example of a 19th-century Carolina I-house. Additional pictures and a sketch of the first floor plan are available. There is also a picture of a surviving tenant house.
