= American Legion Hut (Hampton, South Carolina) =

- U.S. National Register of Historic Places
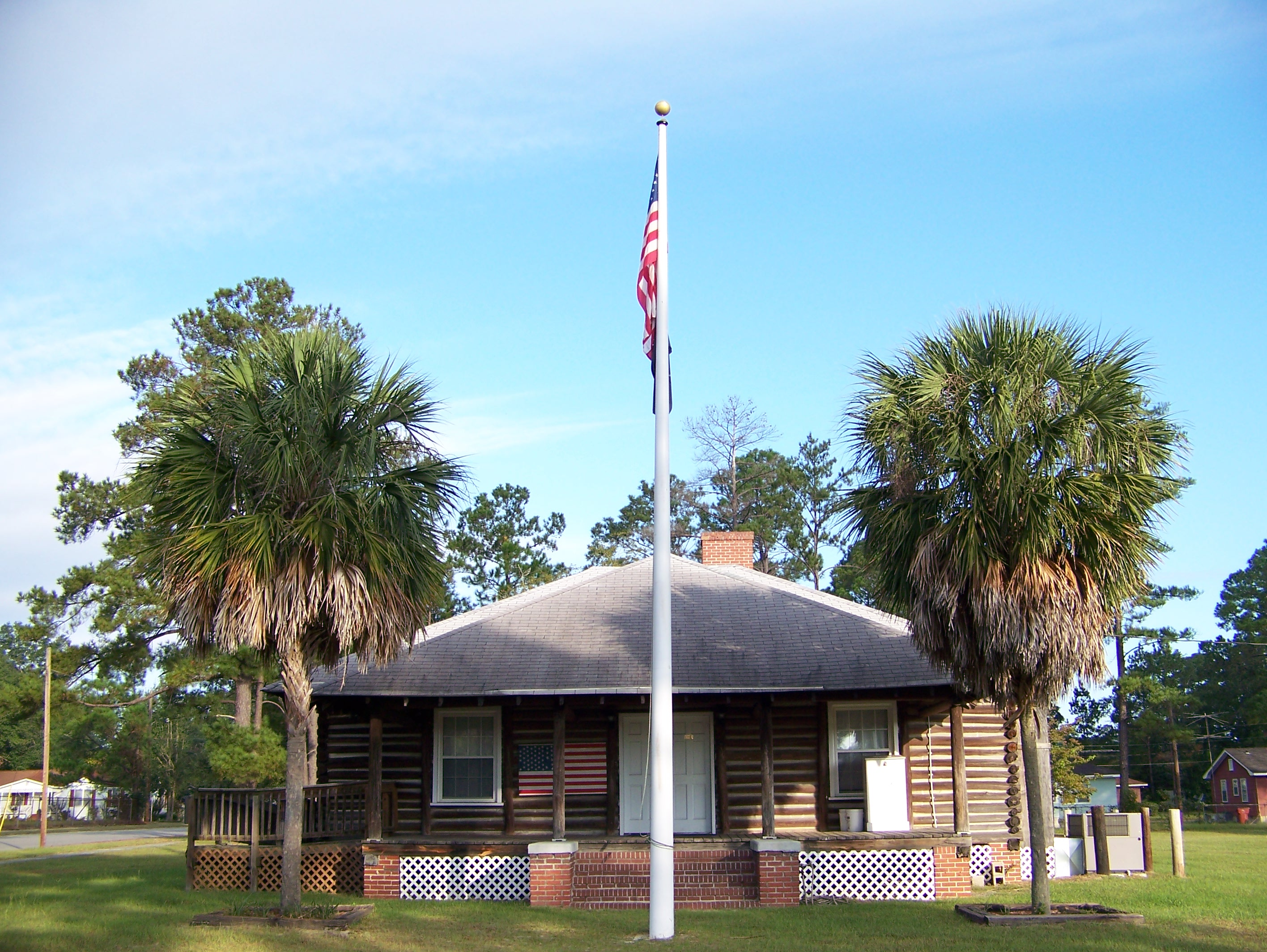
- Hampton American Legion Hut, January 2006

- Location within South Carolina Location within the United States
- Location: Jct. of Hoover St. and Jackson Ave., Hampton, South Carolina
- Coordinates: 32°52′19″N 81°7′3″W
- Area: less than one acre
- Built: 1933
- Architectural style: Log Cabin
- NRHP reference No.: 00001235
- Added to NRHP: October 27, 2000

American Legion Hut is a historic clubhouse located at Hampton, Hampton County, South Carolina. It was built in 1933, and is a one-story, T-shaped cypress log building with a truss roof. The Hut was constructed as, and continues to be a meeting hall for the Hampton American Legion Post 108 as well as serving as a site for civic and social events. Local workers built the Hut supported by funds from the Reconstruction Finance Corporation during the Great Depression.

It was listed on the National Register of Historic Places in 2000.
