= I-house =

Vernacular architectural style

Common I-house layout variety (1870-1915)

The I-house is a vernacular house type, popular in the United States from the colonial period onward. The I-house was so named in the 1930s by Fred Kniffen, a cultural geographer at Louisiana State University who was a specialist in folk architecture. He identified and analyzed the type in his 1936 study of Louisiana house types.

He chose the name "I-house" because the style was commonly built in the rural farm areas of Indiana, Illinois and Iowa, all states beginning with the letter "I". But he was not implying that this house type originated in, or was restricted to, those three states. It is also referred to as Plantation Plain style.

== History and defining characteristics ==
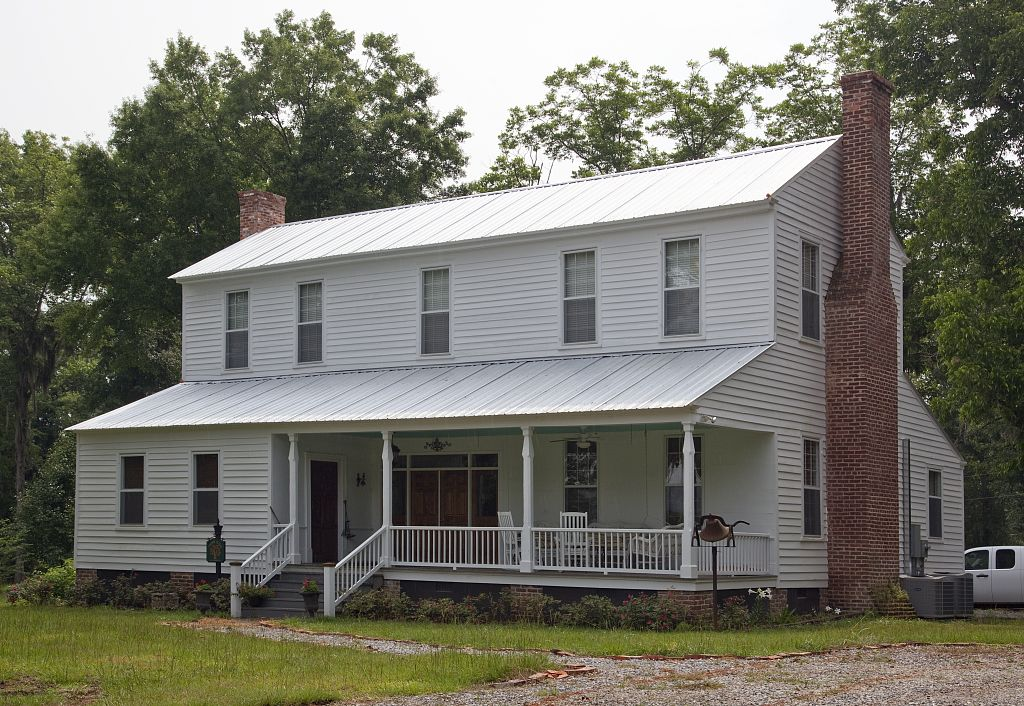
Moss Hill in Wilcox County, Alabama (c.1845), an I-house with front and rear shed rooms and a partial front porch.

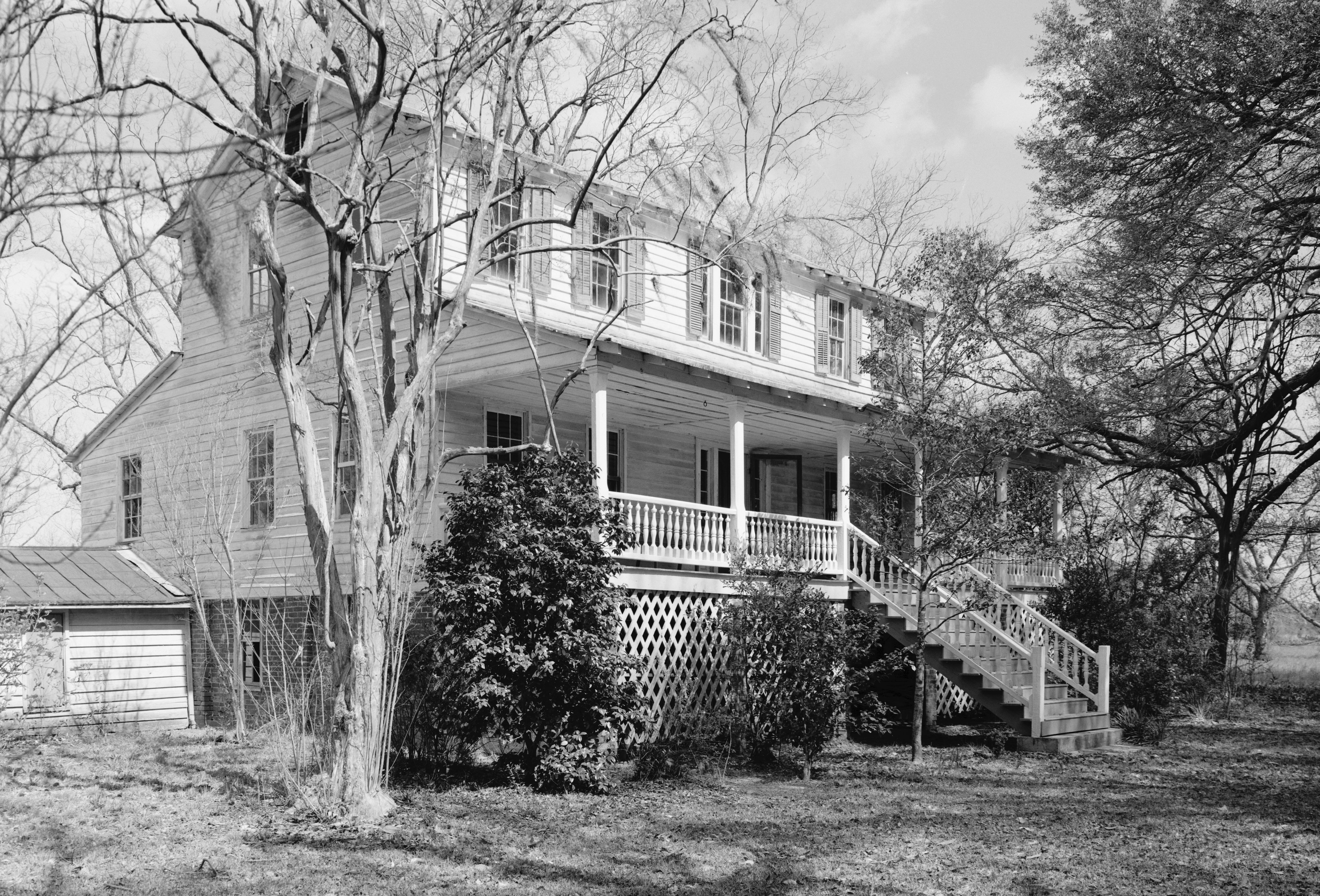
Cohasset (c. 1873), with a full shed-roof front porch and rear shed rooms in Hampton County, South Carolina.

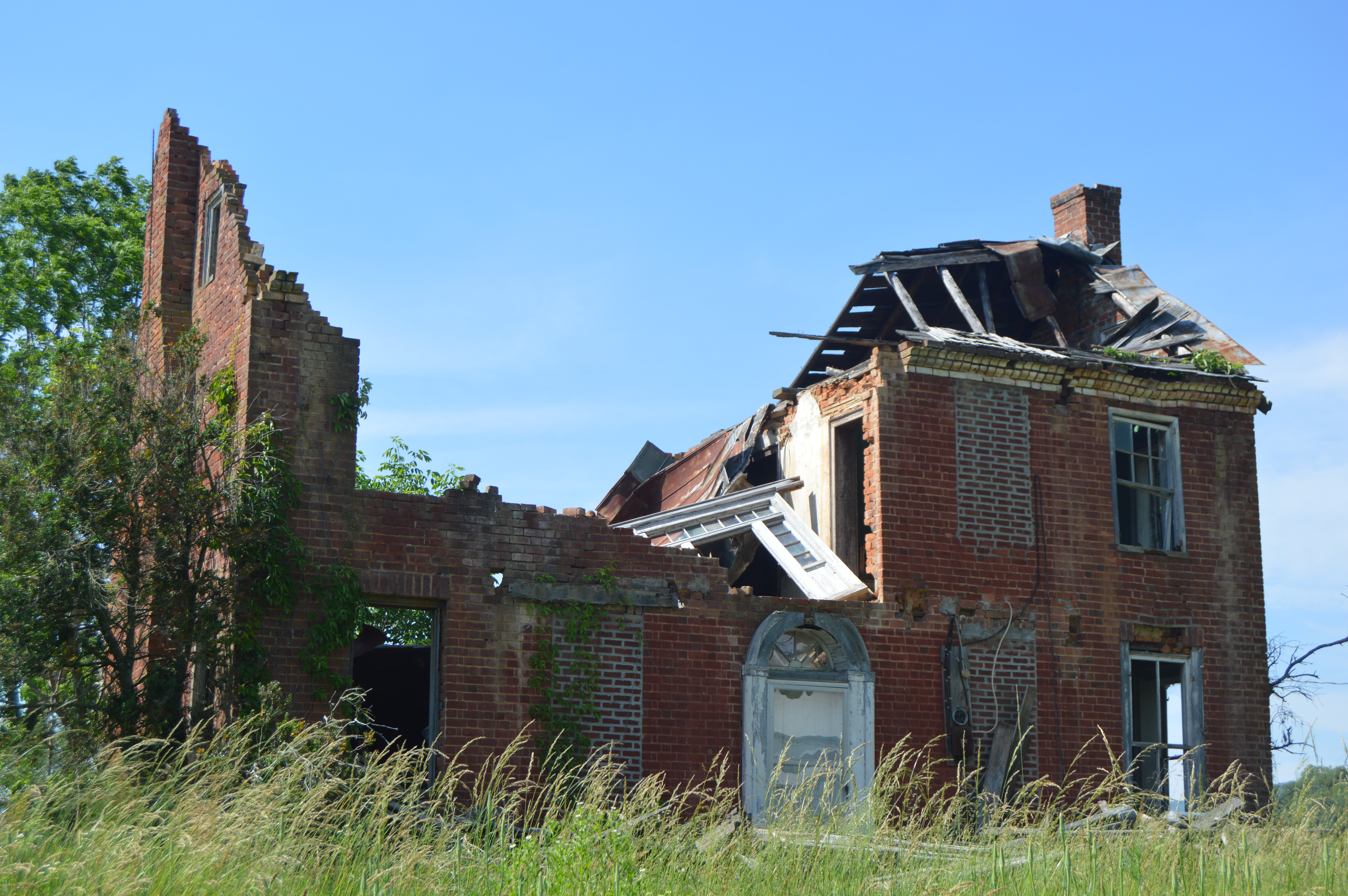
Structural failure reveals the interior layout of this house near Craigsville, Virginia. Second-floor rooms on the right side of the house feature doorways into a central hallway.

The I-house developed from traditional 17th-century British folk house types, such as the hall and parlor house and central-passage house. It became a popular house form in the Mid-Atlantic and Southern United States at an early date, but can be found throughout most of the country in areas that were settled by the mid-19th century. It is especially prevalent through the culturally mixed midland, an area through central Pennsylvania and through Ohio, Indiana and Illinois (or approximate to the old National Road, and now paralleled by Interstate 70). I-houses generally feature gables to the side and are at least two rooms in length, one room deep, and two full stories in height. They also often have a rear wing or ell for a kitchen or additional space. The facade of an I-house tends to be symmetrical. They were constructed in a variety of materials, including logs, wood frame, brick or stone.

In his book on folk architecture in north-central Missouri, Marshall devotes nine pages to the I-house after investigation of close to 100 old houses in the “Little Dixie” region of Missouri. He calls the I-house the “Farmer’s Mansion”. It is the Southern-style house sought by a middle-class planter, a symbol of his success. (DW Meinig introduces the I-house and the dogtrot as symbols of Southern influence in his Shaping of America.) In Little Dixie, originally settled primarily by migrants from the Upper South, settlers were so eager to build an I-house that many lived in tents until they completed their new buildings.

Marshall classifies folk houses by type using rules developed by Henry Glassie in the late 20th century. The basic unit is a sixteen by sixteen foot “hall”, called a pen. A single pen house might be a typical log cabin. Combinations define other types. A two-story, single pen house is known as a stack house. Pens can also be extended side by side to create a two-pen house, which with a central hall becomes a dogtrot. A two-story, two-pen house is the basic I-house. The house may by modified by additions, but the pen system provides a classification.

These nineteenth-century houses lacked indoor plumbing and central heating. The classical I-house has fireplaces in each room. In Missouri, I-houses were built from about 1820 to 1890. The style was brought to the US by the Scots-Irish.

Because of the popularity and simple form of the I-house, decorative elements of popular architectural styles were often used. Through the 1840s, front porches and any decoration were primarily designed in the restrained Federal manner. The Greek Revival style was also used during the 1840s and 1850s. The I-house was also adapted to Gothic Revival and Italianate styles during the mid-19th century. Late 19th-century I-houses often featured Queen Anne and Eastlake-Stick style details.

=== I-house with sheds (Plantation Plain) ===
In the South, a variation of the I-house, with one-story, rear shed rooms and usually a full-width front porch, is often referred to as the Plantation Plain house type. It is more directly described as an I-house with sheds.

== See also ==
- List of house types
- List of house styles
