= Luray, South Carolina =

- Town
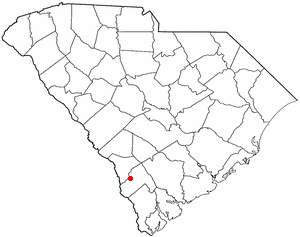
- Location of Luray, South Carolina
- Coordinates: 32°48′51″N 81°14′25″W
- Country: United States
- State: South Carolina
- County: Hampton

Area
  - Total: 1.03 sq mi (2.68 km^{2})
  - Land: 1.03 sq mi (2.68 km^{2})
  - Water: 0 sq mi (0.00 km^{2})
- Elevation: 138 ft (42 m)

Population (2020)
  - Total: 98
  - Density: 94.9/sq mi (36.63/km^{2})
- Time zone: UTC-5 (Eastern (EST))
  - Summer (DST): UTC-4 (EDT)
- ZIP code: 29932
- Area codes: 803, 839
- FIPS code: 45-43090
- GNIS feature ID: 2406059

Luray is a town in Hampton County, South Carolina, United States. The population was 127 at the 2010 census.

== Geography ==
Luray is located in west-central Hampton County. U.S. Route 321 (Columbia Highway) passes through the town, leading north 10 miles (16 km) to Fairfax and south 4 miles (6 km) to Estill. South Carolina Highway 363 intersects US 321 at the northern border of Luray and heads east 9 miles (14 km) to Hampton, the county seat.

According to the United States Census Bureau, Luray has a total area of 1.0 square mile (2.7 km^{2}), all land.

== Demographics ==
Historical population
Census	Pop.	Note	%±
1900	131		—
1910	194		48.1%
1920	174		−10.3%
1930	188		8.0%
1940	162		−13.8%
1950	102		−37.0%
1960	102		0.0%
1970	72		−29.4%
1980	149		106.9%
1990	102		−31.5%
2000	115		12.7%
2010	127		10.4%
2020	98		−22.8%
U.S. Decennial Census

As of the census of 2000, there were 115 people, 45 households, and 27 families residing in the town. The population density was 107.1 inhabitants per square mile (41.4/km^{2}). There were 52 housing units at an average density of 48.4 per square mile (18.7/km^{2}). The racial makeup of the town was 59.13% White, 33.91% African American, 0.87% Native American, 5.22% from other races, and 0.87% from two or more races. Hispanic or Latino of any race were 1.91% of the population.

There were 45 households, out of which 26.7% had children under the age of 18 living with them, 37.8% were married couples living together, 20.0% had a female householder with no husband present, and 37.8% were non-families. 33.3% of all households were made up of individuals, and 11.1% had someone living alone who was 65 years of age or older. The average household size was 2.56 and the average family size was 3.39.

In the town, the population was spread out, with 30.4% under the age of 18, 6.1% from 18 to 24, 27.0% from 25 to 44, 20.0% from 45 to 64, and 16.5% who were 65 years of age or older. The median age was 36 years. For every 100 females, there were 109.1 males. For every 100 females age 18 and over, there were 100.0 males.

The median income for a household in the town was $26,875, and the median income for a family was $35,625. Males had a median income of $31,250 versus $9,375 for females. The per capita income for the town was $13,154. There were 32.0% of families and 32.7% of the population living below the poverty line, including 46.9% of under eighteens and none of those over 64.
