= Bank of Hampton =

- U.S. National Register of Historic Places
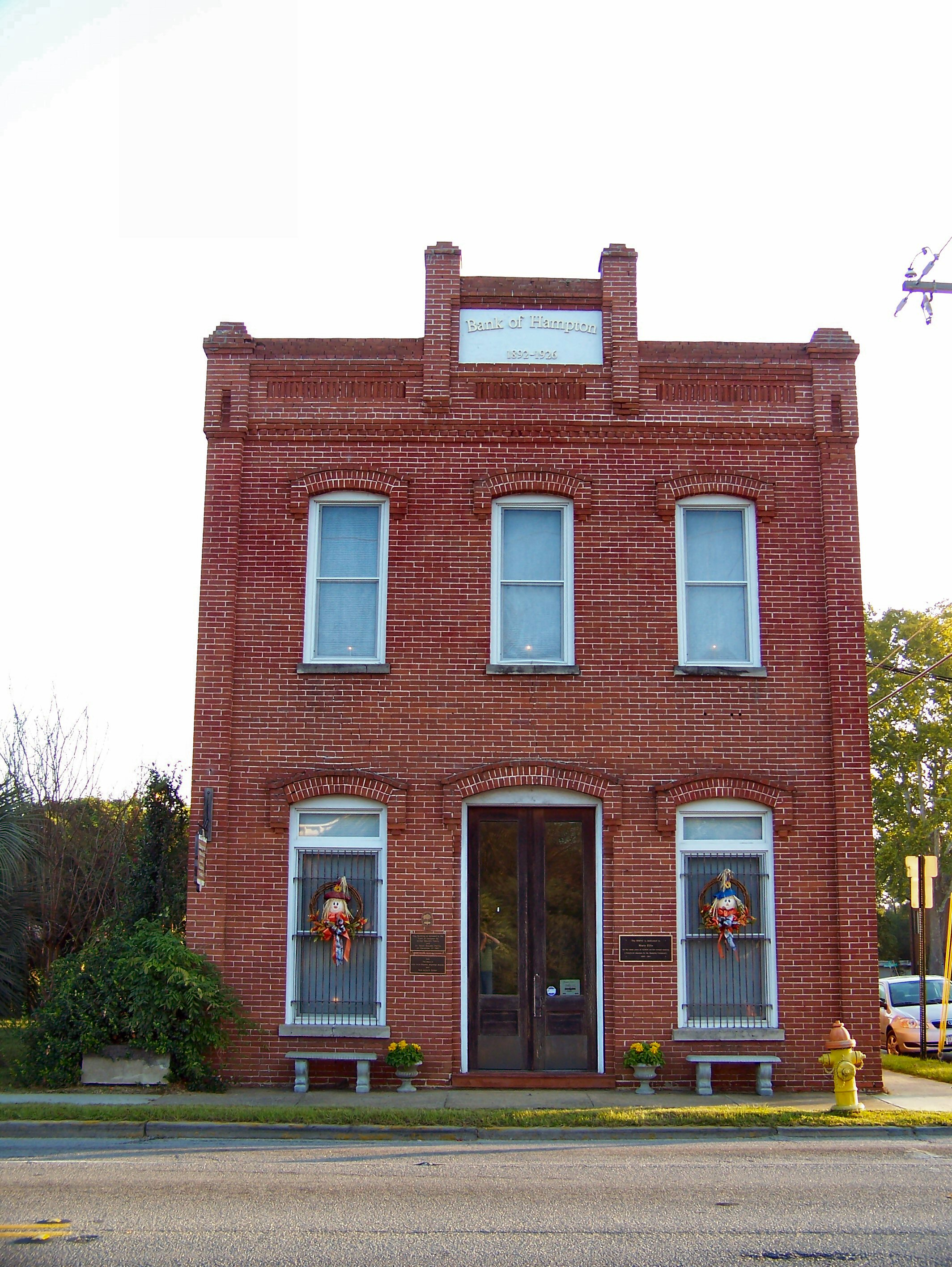
- Bank of Hampton, January 2006

- Location within South Carolina Location within the United States
- Location: 15 Elm St., E, Hampton, South Carolina
- Coordinates: 32°51′59″N 81°6′31″W
- Area: less than one acre
- Built: 1892
- Built by: Fontaine, Vincent Joseph
- Architectural style: Italianate
- NRHP reference No.: 01000606
- Added to NRHP: May 30, 2001

The Bank of Hampton is a historic bank building located at Hampton, Hampton County, South Carolina.

== Description and history ==
It was built in 1891–1892, and is a two-story Italianate-influenced brick building. The building features segmental arches over door and window openings, and low flat parapets at the side elevations. The Bank of Hampton operated until 1926. From the 1930s to the 1960s the building was operated as rental commercial space, with upstairs law offices.

Since 1987, the building has housed the Hampton Museum and Visitors’ Center.

It was listed on the National Register of Historic Places on May 30, 2001.
