= Oak Grove (Hampton County, South Carolina) =

Historic house in South Carolina, United States

- U.S. National Register of Historic Places
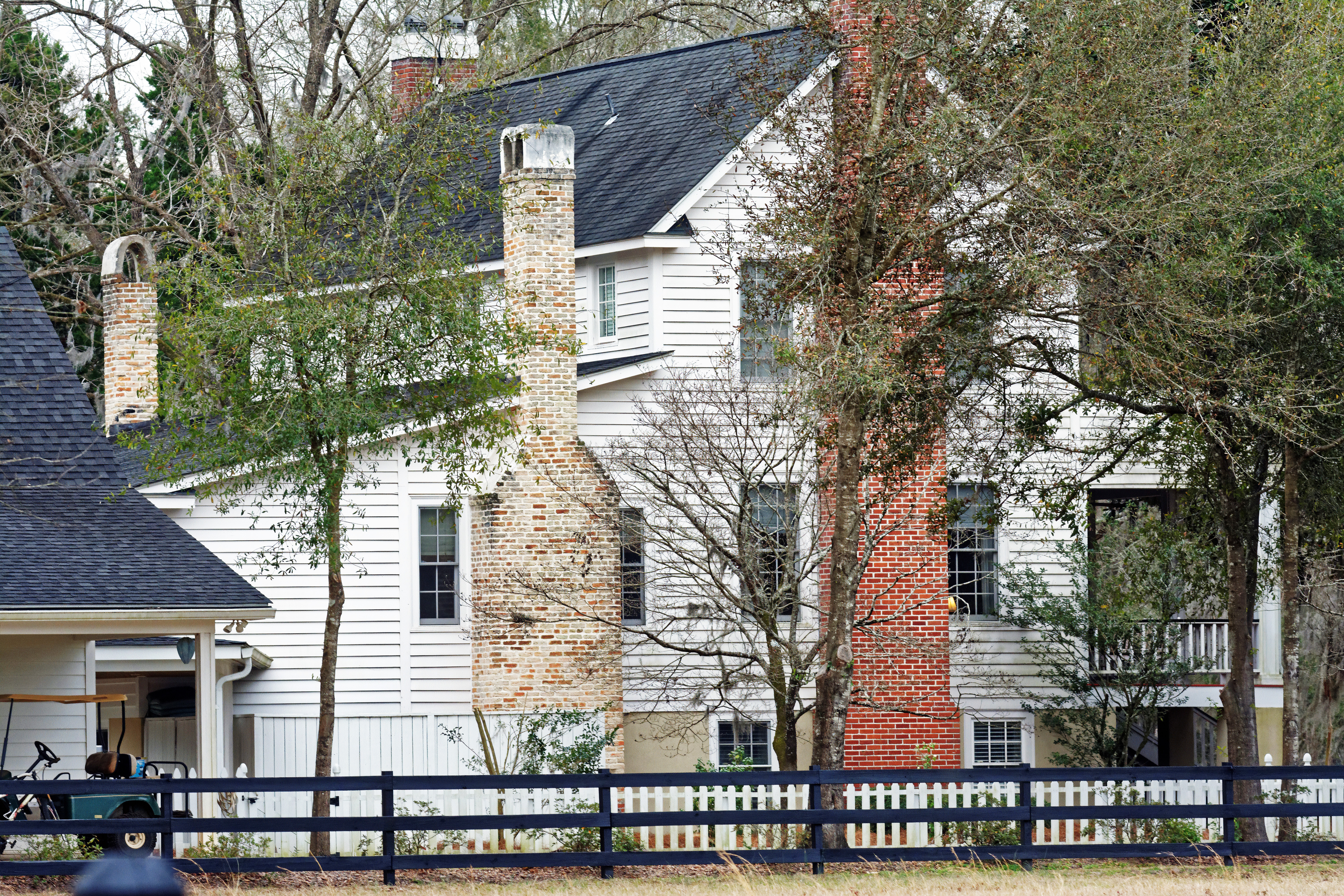
- The main house in 2017

- Location within South Carolina Location within the United States
- Location: Southwest of Brunson, near Brunson, South Carolina
- Coordinates: 32.91357°N 81.216°W
- Area: 20.5 acres (8.3 ha)
- Built: 1852
- Architectural style: Greek Revival
- NRHP reference No.: 76001704
- Added to NRHP: July 12, 1976

Oak Grove, also known as Richardson Place, is a historic home located near Brunson, Hampton County, South Carolina. It was built in 1852, and is a two-story, Greek Revival style clapboard dwelling on a raised basement. The front facade features a two-story veranda. It is believed that General William Tecumseh Sherman visited Oak Grove during the American Civil War, while on his rampage through the Carolinas during his Campaign of the Carolinas.

It was listed on the National Register of Historic Places in 1976.
