= Palmetto Theatre =

Historic theatre in South Carolina, US

- U.S. National Register of Historic Places
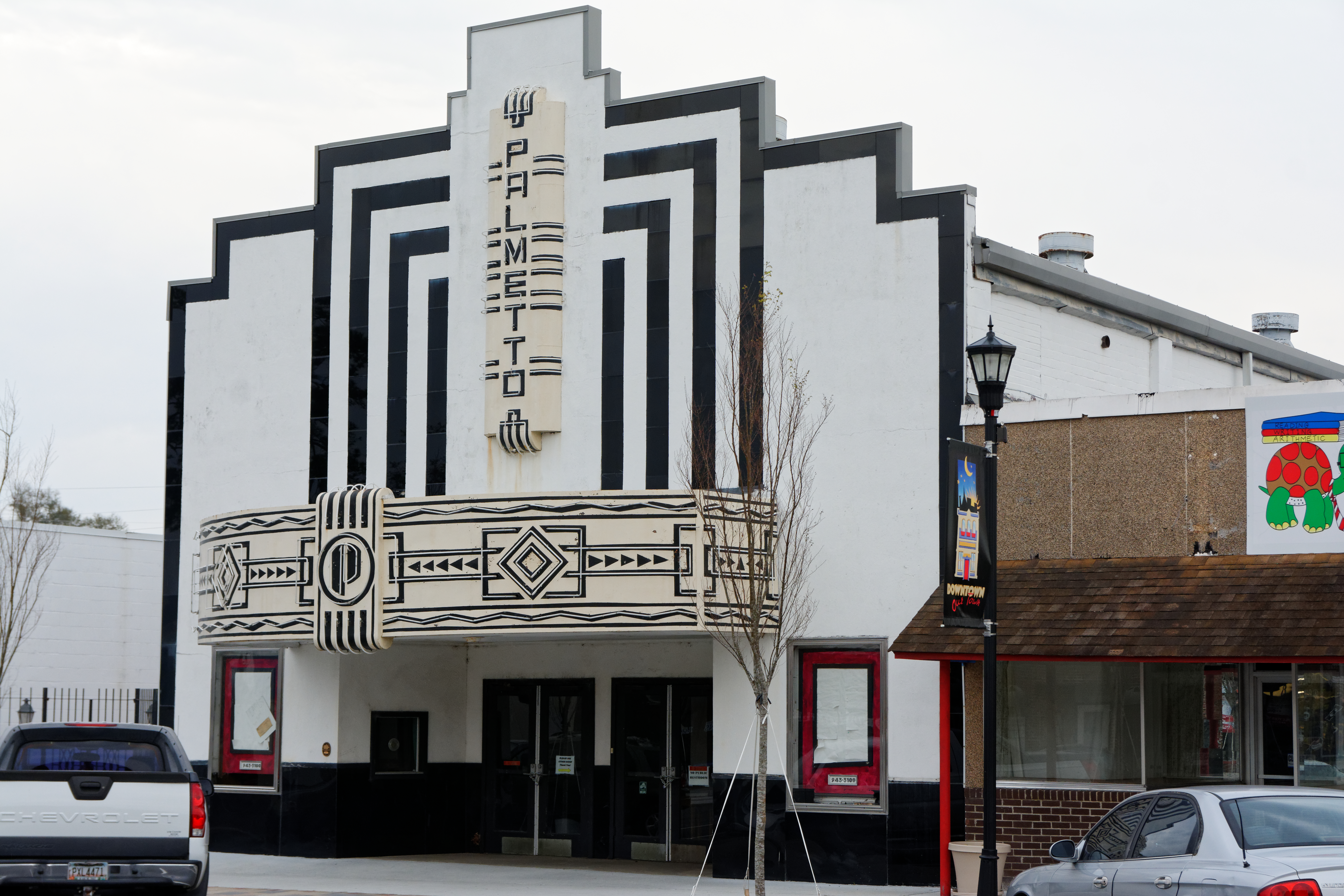
- The theatre in 2017

- Location within South Carolina Location within the United States
- Location: 109 Lee Ave., Hampton, South Carolina
- Coordinates: 32°52′06″N 81°06′26″W
- Area: less than one acre
- Built: 1946
- Built by: Freeman, Clarence L.
- Architectural style: Art Deco, Art Moderne
- NRHP reference No.: 12000849
- Added to NRHP: October 9, 2012

Palmetto Theatre is a historic movie theater located at Hampton, Hampton County, South Carolina. It was built in 1946, and is an Art Deco-influenced Art Moderne style building. It features a prominent, ornate, projecting marquee with highly stylized neon lettering and geometric patterns. The theater was designed to seat 450 people, including balcony seats.

It was listed on the National Register of Historic Places in 2012.
