= The Pineland =

Historic house in South Carolina, United States

- U.S. National Register of Historic Places
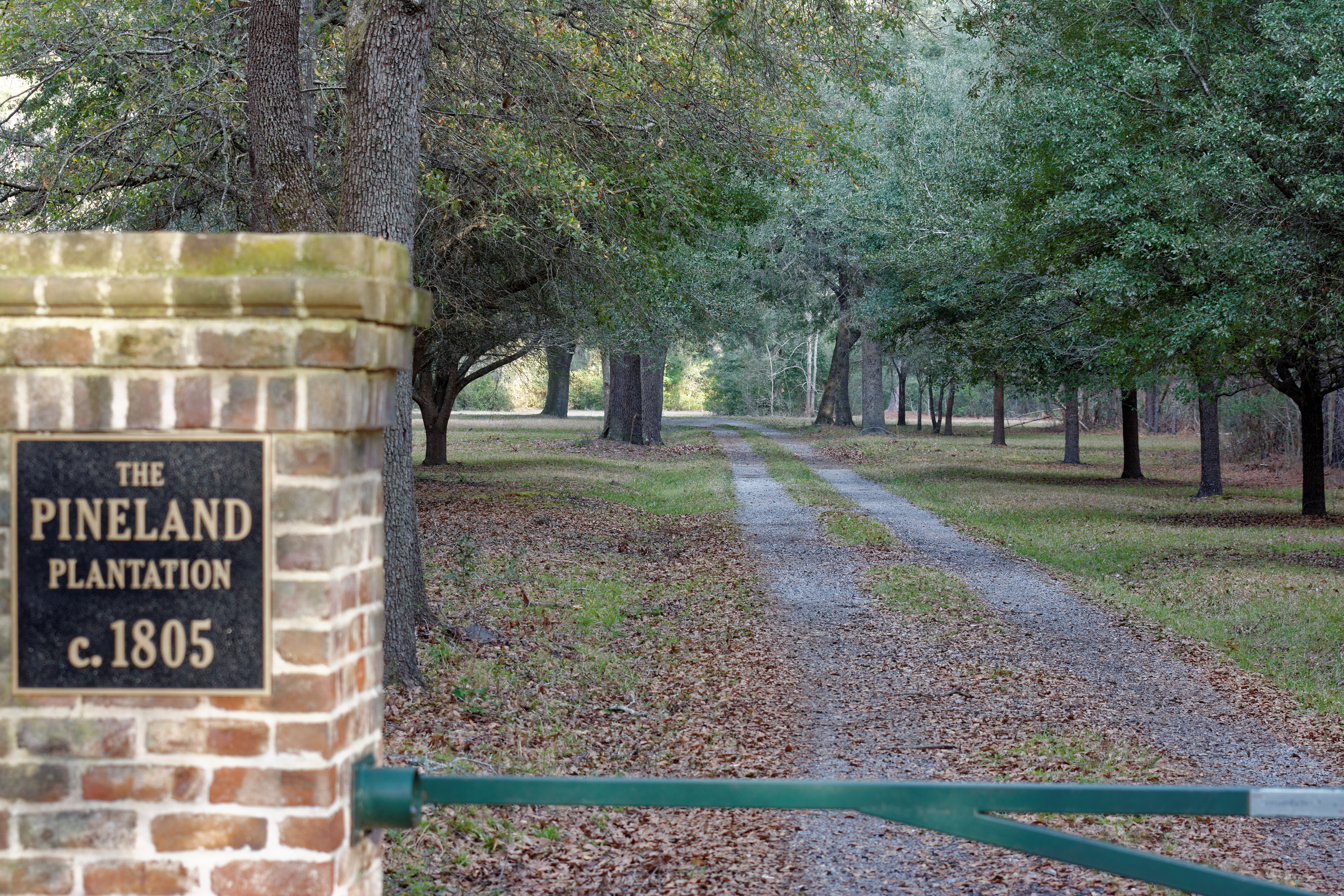
- Plantation gate

- Location within South Carolina Location within the United States
- Location: The Pineland Lane, off U.S. Hwy. 321, near Garnett, South Carolina
- Coordinates: 32.61536°N 81.24114°W
- Area: 6 acres (2.4 ha)
- Built: Before 1820, probably c.1805
- Built by: William Henry Lawton
- Architectural style: Greek Revival
- NRHP reference No.: 99000814
- Added to NRHP: July 8, 1999

The Pineland, also known as Black Swamp Plantation Summer House, is a historic home located near Garnett, Hampton County, South Carolina. It is an example of late Federal–early Greek Revival residential design with Victorian-era alterations and additions. The house evolved from a summer house for nearby Black Swamp Plantation during the period ca. 1800–1865 to a main residence since 1865. The house is a one-story, double pile, lateral gable, composition shingle-clad roofed residence set upon a high stuccoed brick pier foundation with diagonal wood lattice infill.

It was listed on the National Register of Historic Places in 1999.
