= Crocketville, South Carolina =

- Unincorporated community
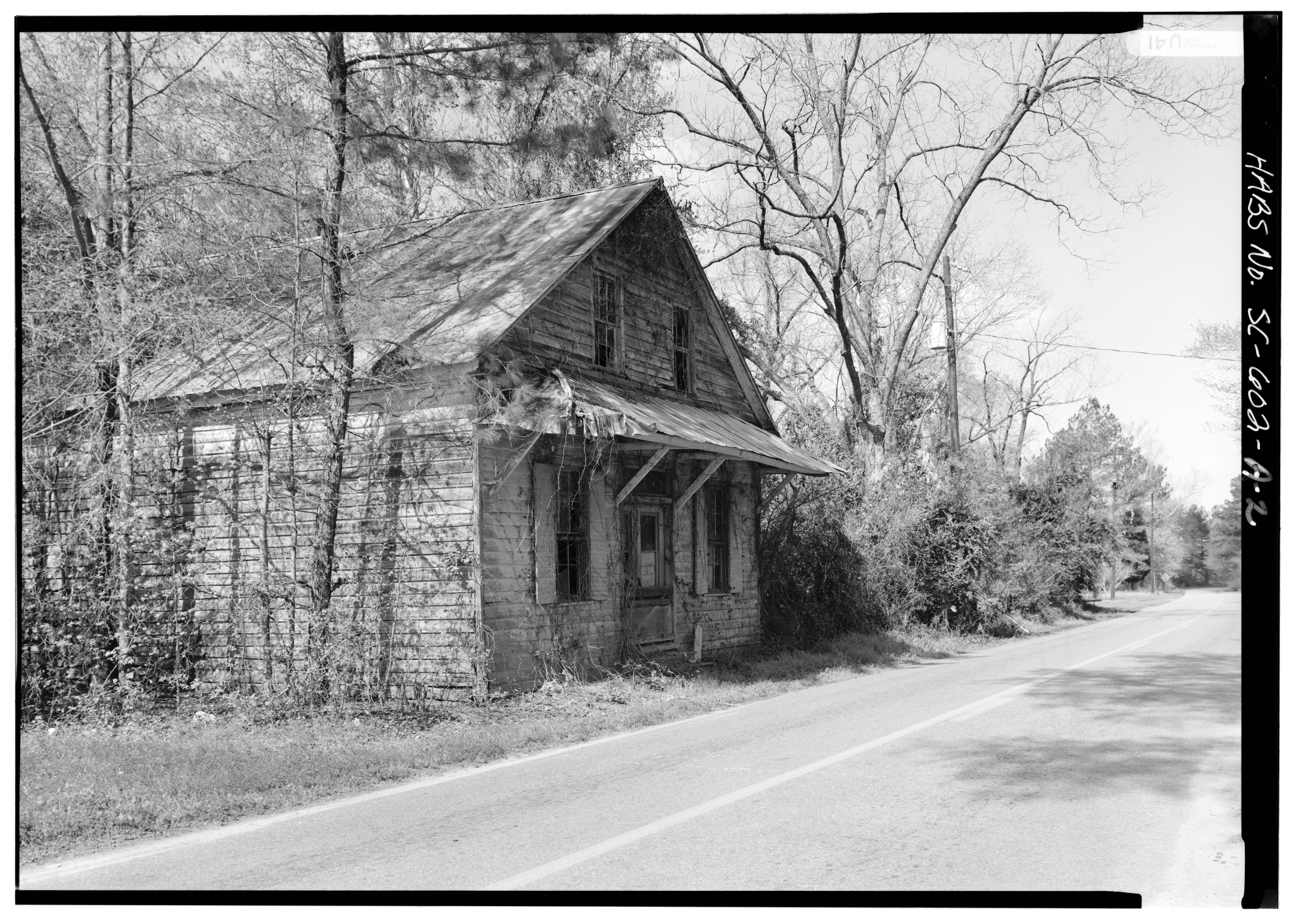
- The former Crocketville Country Store on US 601

- Location within South Carolina Location within the United States
- Coordinates: 32°55′00″N 81°04′38″W
- Country: United States
- State: South Carolina
- County: Hampton
- Elevation: 112 ft (34 m)
- Time zone: UTC-5 (Eastern (EST))
  - Summer (DST): UTC-4 (EDT)
- ZIP code: 29913
- Area codes: 803, 839
- GNIS feature ID: 1247426

Crocketville is an unincorporated community in Hampton County, South Carolina, United States. The community is located on U.S. Route 601, 3.7 miles (6.0 km) northeast of Hampton.
