= Hampton Colored School =

- U.S. National Register of Historic Places
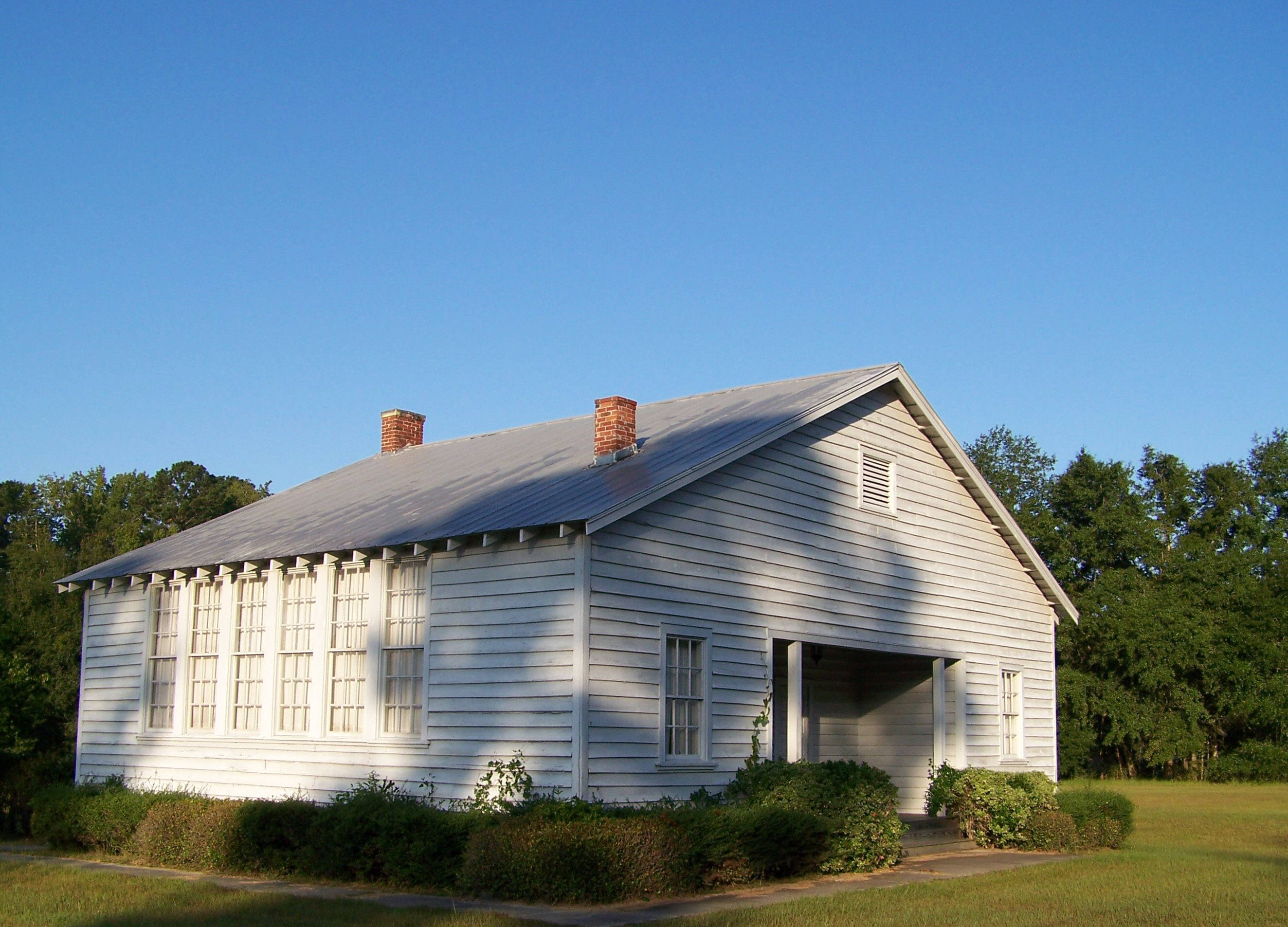
- Hampton Colored School, January 2006

- Location within South Carolina Location within the United States
- Location: W. Holly St. E. of jct. with Hoover St., Hampton, South Carolina
- Coordinates: 32°52′05″N 81°07′14″W
- Area: 2.8 acres (1.1 ha)
- Built: 1929
- Built by: Johnson, Ervin
- NRHP reference No.: 91000233
- Added to NRHP: February 28, 1991

Hampton Colored School is a historic school for African-American students located at Hampton, Hampton County, South Carolina. It was built in 1929, and is a one-story, front-gable, rectangular, frame building. It has clapboard siding, a tin roof, exposed rafters, and a brick pier foundation. It remained the only black school in Hampton until 1947, when Hampton Colored High School was built and the Hampton Colored School became the lunchroom for the high school.

The Hampton Colored School Museum and Resource Center is owned by the Town of Hampton and operated as a museum of area African American history.

It was listed on the National Register of Historic Places in 1991.
