= Brunson, South Carolina =

- Town
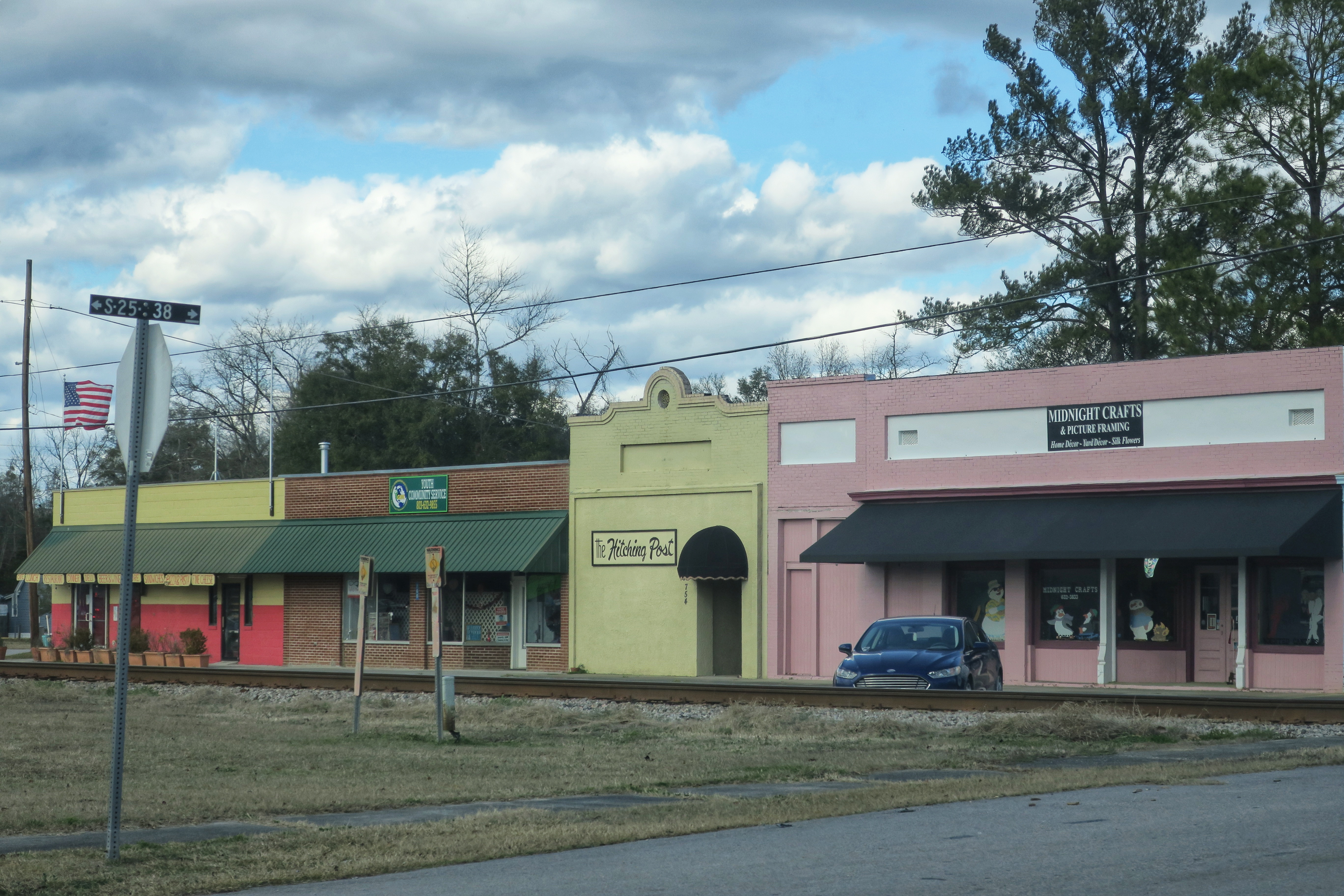
- Downtown Brunson

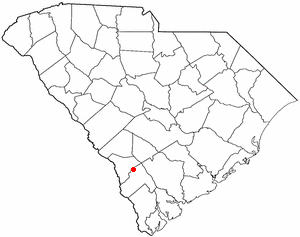
- Location of Brunson, South Carolina
- Coordinates: 32°55′27″N 81°11′19″W
- Country: United States
- State: South Carolina
- County: Hampton

Area
  - Total: 1.02 sq mi (2.63 km^{2})
  - Land: 1.02 sq mi (2.63 km^{2})
  - Water: 0 sq mi (0.00 km^{2})
- Elevation: 138 ft (42 m)

Population (2020)
  - Total: 431
  - Density: 423.8/sq mi (163.63/km^{2})
- Time zone: UTC-5 (Eastern (EST))
  - Summer (DST): UTC-4 (EDT)
- ZIP code: 29911
- Area codes: 803, 839
- FIPS code: 45-09865
- GNIS feature ID: 2405336
- Website: brunson.sc.gov

Brunson is a town in Hampton County, South Carolina, United States. As of the 2020 census, Brunson had a population of 431.

== Geography ==
Brunson is located in northern Hampton County. U.S. Route 278 (Railroad Avenue) passes through the center of town, leading northwest 3 miles (5 km) to Fairfax and southeast 6 miles (10 km) to Hampton, the county seat.

According to the United States Census Bureau, the town of Brunson has a total area of 1.0 square mile (2.6 km^{2}), all land.

== Demographics ==
Historical population
Census	Pop.	Note	%±
1880	167		—
1890	470		181.4%
1900	342		−27.2%
1910	610		78.4%
1920	699		14.6%
1930	675		−3.4%
1940	542		−19.7%
1950	607		12.0%
1960	603		−0.7%
1970	559		−7.3%
1980	590		5.5%
1990	587		−0.5%
2000	589		0.3%
2010	554		−5.9%
2020	431		−22.2%
U.S. Decennial Census

As of the census of 2000, there were 589 people, 237 households, and 162 families residing in the town. The population density was 581.3 people per square mile (224.4 people/km^{2}). There were 287 housing units at an average density of 283.3 per square mile (109.4/km^{2}). The racial makeup of the town was 55.35% White, 42.44% African American, 1.36% from other races, and 0.85% from two or more races. Hispanic or Latino of any race were 1.53% of the population.

There were 237 households, out of which 30.8% had children under the age of 18 living with them, 46.8% were married couples living together, 17.3% had a female householder with no husband present, and 31.6% were non-families. 28.3% of all households were made up of individuals, and 13.9% had someone living alone who was 65 years of age or older. The average household size was 2.49 and the average family size was 3.06.

In the town, the population was spread out, with 25.5% under the age of 18, 10.5% from 18 to 24, 26.0% from 25 to 44, 22.2% from 45 to 64, and 15.8% who were 65 years of age or older. The median age was 37 years. For every 100 females, there were 92.5 males. For every 100 females age 18 and over, there were 83.7 males.

The median income for a household in the town was $30,556, and the median income for a family was $32,778. Males had a median income of $30,833 versus $21,042 for females. The per capita income for the town was $14,431. About 13.7% of families and 16.0% of the population were below the poverty line, including 21.7% of those under age 18 and 10.1% of those age 65 or over.

== Landmarks ==
The Brunson town hall is cited in Ripley's Believe It or Not! as the only octagonal town hall in the world built on stilts.

Oak Grove was listed on the National Register of Historic Places in 1976.
