= Hampton County Courthouse =

Historic courthouse in South Carolina, US

- U.S. National Register of Historic Places
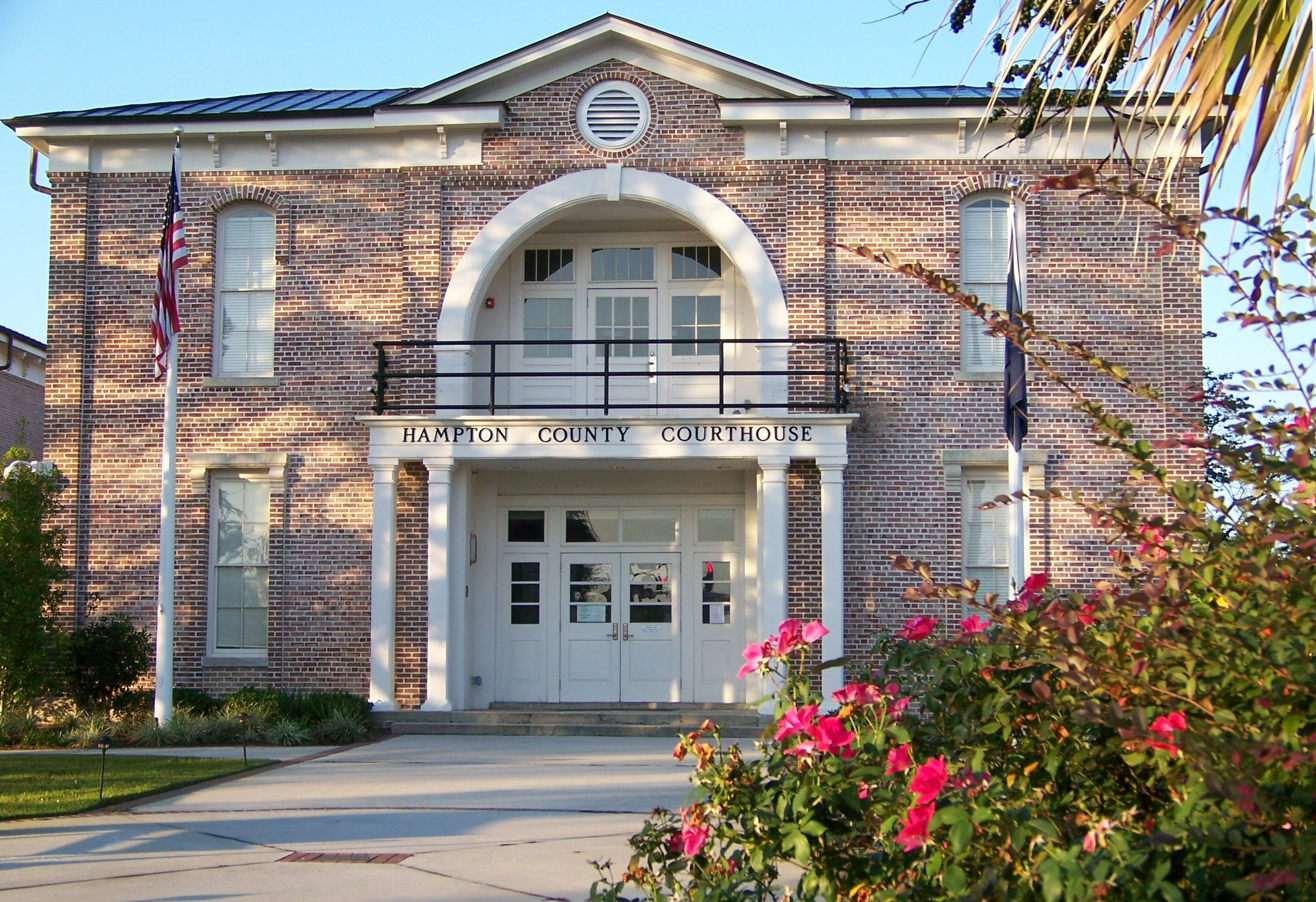
- Hampton County Courthouse, January 2006

- Location within South Carolina Location within the United States
- Location: U.S. 278, Hampton, South Carolina
- Coordinates: 32.86616°N 81.10932°W
- Area: 3.1 acres (1.3 ha)
- Built: 1878
- Architectural style: Italianate
- NRHP reference No.: 78002517
- Added to NRHP: December 12, 1978

Hampton County Courthouse is a historic courthouse building located at Hampton, Hampton County, South Carolina. It was built in 1878, and was originally a two-story structure constructed of brick laid in the common bond pattern in the Italianate style. In 1925, the courthouse was renovated and additional wings were added to the front and rear facades. Also located on the property are two small modern annexes situated directly to the rear of the courthouse, and a two-story brick annex (ca. 1935).

It was listed on the National Register of Historic Places in 1978.
