= USS Cohasset =

Three ships of the United States Navy have borne the name USS Cohasset, in honor of Cohasset, Massachusetts

- USS Cohasset, was a tugboat. Originally called E. D. Fogg and later Narragansett, she was built in 1860 and purchased by the Navy in 1861. She was sold in 1892.
- USS Cohasset, was a cargo ship, built in 1918 and decommissioned in 1919.
- USS Cohasset (IX-198), originally LST-129, was an LST-1-class tank landing ship, launched in 1943, redesignated and named in 1944, and struck in 1946.
