= Stoney Creek Independent Presbyterian Chapel of Prince William Parish =

Historic church in South Carolina, United States

- U.S. National Register of Historic Places
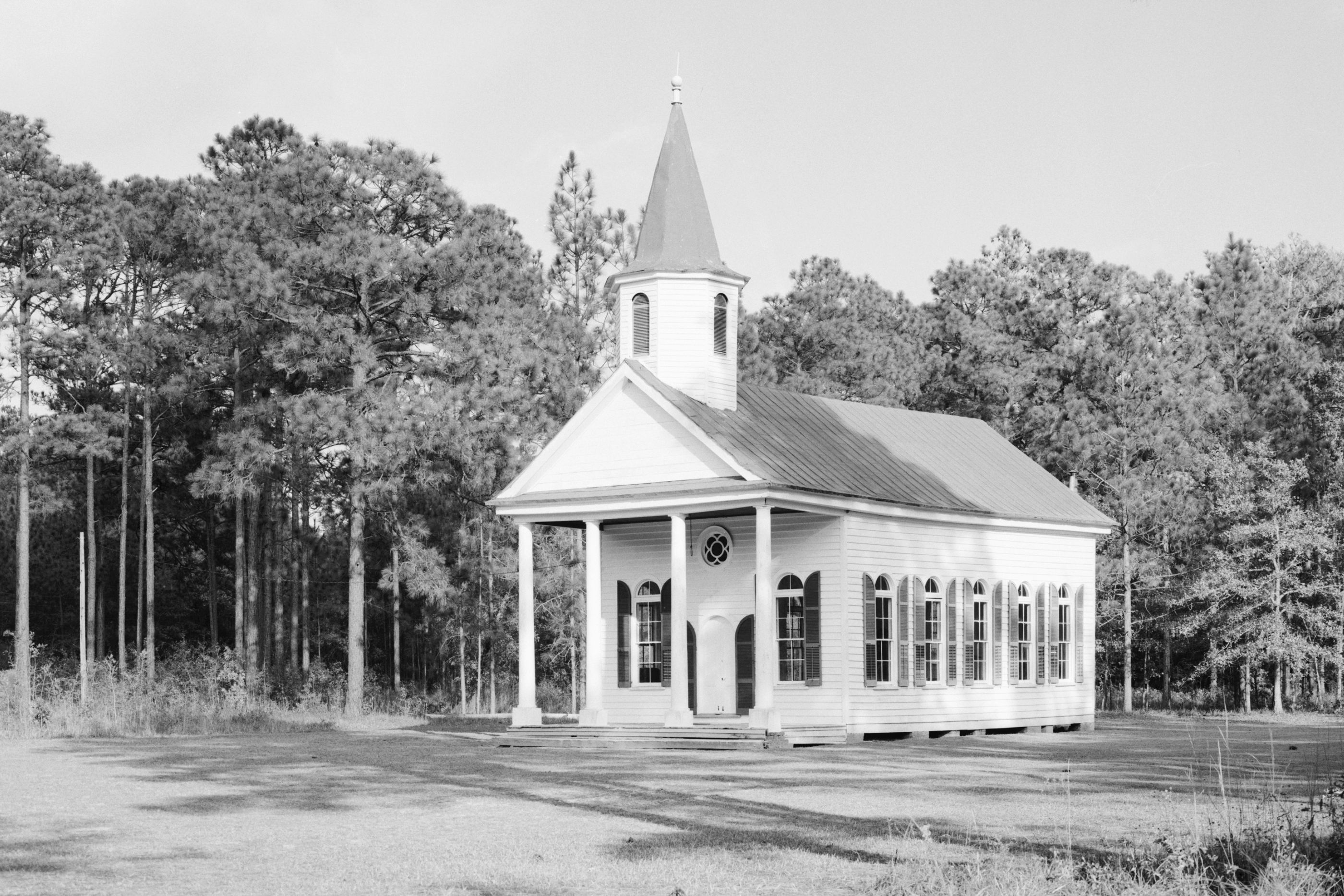
- Stoney Creek Presbyterian Chapel in 1987

- Location within South Carolina Location within the United States
- Location: McPhersonville, South Carolina
- Coordinates: 32.69207°N 80.91472°W
- Built: 1833
- Architectural style: Greek Revival
- NRHP reference No.: 02000559
- Added to NRHP: May 22, 2002

Stoney Creek Independent Presbyterian Chapel of Prince William Parish or Stoney Creek Presbyterian Chapel is a chapel in southeastern Hampton County, South Carolina, United States in the unincorporated community of McPhersonville, South Carolina about 4 mi (6 km) west of Yemassee. In the USGS Geographic Names Information System, it is called McPhersonville Church. It was built about 1833. It is one block north of Pocotaglio Road (State Highway 25–17) on State Highway 25-286. The chapel is only antebellum structure in McPhersonville. It was named to the National Register of Historic Places on May 22, 2002.

== History ==
In 1743, a group of local residents established a non-Anglican Stoney Creek church near the unincorporated community of Pocotaligo on Pocotaglio River. The minister was William Hutson, who was a disciple of George Whitefield. In 1785, this was incorporated as the Independent Presbyterian Chapel of Prince William Parish.

Before the Civil War, many rice-planters from Prince William Parish built summer homes on McPhersonville, which was then in Beaufort District. This enabled them to stay at somewhat higher ground during the hotter months of summer with malaria-bearing mosquitoes. In 1832, some planters set aside about 1 acre (0.4 ha) for the construction of a summer chapel.

The chapel was used as hospital and campsite by the Union Army. The parent Stoney Creek Presbyterian Church on the Pocotaligo River was dismantled for use in the construction of a bridge and other structures.

After the war, the congregation used the summer chapel in McPhersonville. The congregation eventually diminished and was dissolved in 1967. The chapel was assigned under the custody of the First Presbyterian Church of Beaufort.

It was used as a filming location in 1993s Forrest Gump. It stood in for the Four Square Baptist Church where Gump prays with the choir for shrimp.

== Architecture ==
The chapel is a simple, Greek Revival structure with gabled roof. Its facade faces southwest. It has a rectangular plan with a semi-hexagonal bay in the rear. The rectangular portion of building is about 40 ft (12 m) long, 24 ft (7 m) wide. There is a front portico that is about 11 ft (3 m) long and 24 ft (7 m) wide with four Doric, solid heart pine columns that rest on wooden plinths. There is a simple pediment on the front facade. There are central arched doors flanked by four over four light windows topped with two light semi-elliptical transoms. There is a round stained glass window above the doorway. The side elevations have five bays with four over four windows with similar semi-elliptical transoms. The rear bay has two smaller four over four windows. All these windows have arched, louvered shutters.

An octagonal steeple with arched six light windows on four sides over the portico was added in 1890. The steeple is topped with a wooden finial.

The interior has plain plaster walls, its original wooden pews, and wide pine floors. A two-tiered platform is at the rear. A Farrand & Votey pump organ is in front of the rear door. It is screened by a paneled balustrade topped with a privacy curtain hung from turned posts that extend above each end of the balustrade. There is painted communion table in the front. Electrical lights have replaced the original kerosene hanging lamps.

A sketch of the floor plan and front and side elevations have been published. Additional pictures are available.
