= McPhersonville, South Carolina =

Unincorporated community in South Carolina, US

Coordinates: 32°41′31″N 80°55′09″W

McPhersonville is an unincorporated community in eastern Hampton County, South Carolina, United States, near the county's borders with Beaufort and Jasper counties. Once an important center of affluence and culture in colonial Prince William Parish (roughly analogous to modern-day Hampton County), McPhersonville is now little more than a marked location on a secondary road between Yemassee and Early Branch.

== Geography ==
McPhersonville is located at 32° 41' 31" North, 80° 55' 09" West (32.6918437, -80.9192743). It is approximately 85 feet above sea level. The McPhersonville area is largely shady pine forests in sandy soil, which made it an attractive summer retreat for colonial plantation owners from the lower areas closer to the Atlantic coast, along with their extended families.

== Modern history ==
There are no significant businesses in modern McPhersonville, though the area has experienced a small renaissance in the past 20 years as modern property owners and investors are drawn to the same favorable environmental conditions that lured the early settlers. Stoney Creek Independent Presbyterian Chapel is now administered by Stoney Creek Presbyterian Foundation, associated with First Presbyterian Church in Beaufort. It was used as the Four Square Baptist Church where Gump prays with the choir for shrimp in the film Forrest Gump.
