= Hampton County, South Carolina =

County in South Carolina, United States

- County
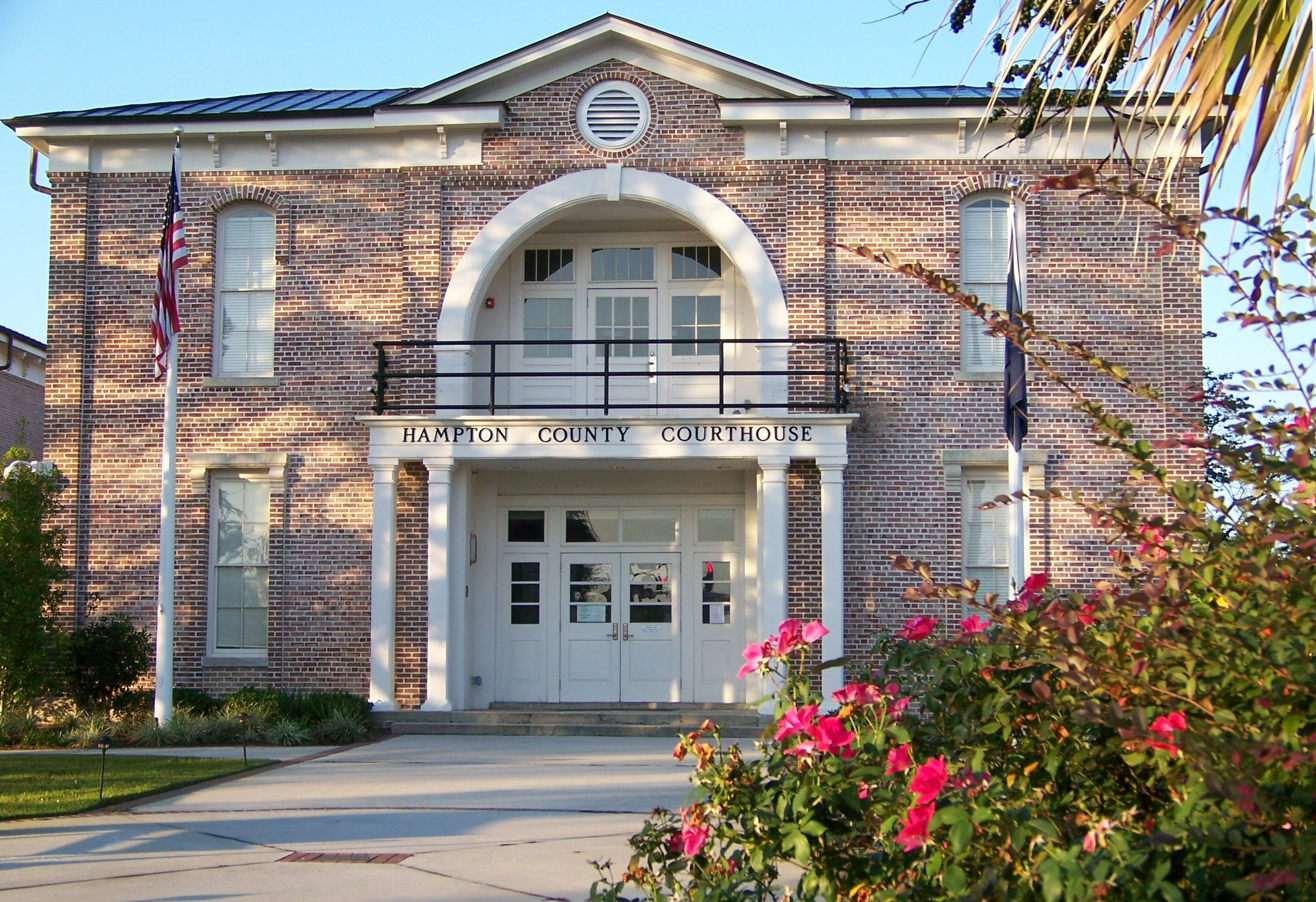
- Hampton County Courthouse

- Seal
- Motto(s): "Pro Bono Publico" (Latin) (For the Public Good)
- Location within the U.S. state of South Carolina
- Interactive map of Hampton County, South Carolina
- Coordinates: 32.78°N 81.14°W
- Country: United States
- State: South Carolina
- Founded: 1878
- Named for: Wade Hampton III
- Seat: Hampton
- Largest community: Hampton

Area
  - Total: 562.71 sq mi (1,457.4 km^{2})
  - Land: 559.98 sq mi (1,450.3 km^{2})
  - Water: 2.73 sq mi (7.1 km^{2}) 0.49%

Population (2020)
  - Total: 18,561
  - Estimate (2025): 18,174 ▼
  - Density: 33.146/sq mi (12.798/km^{2})
- Time zone: UTC−5 (Eastern)
  - Summer (DST): UTC−4 (EDT)
- Congressional district: 6th
- Website: www.hamptoncountysc.org

Hampton County is a rural county located in the U.S. state of South Carolina. As of the 2020 census, the population was 18,561. Its county seat is Hampton. It was named for Confederate Civil War general Wade Hampton, who in the late 1870s, with the ending of Reconstruction, was elected as governor of South Carolina.

== History ==
The county is named for Wade Hampton III, one of the country's leading slaveowners and a Lieutenant General for the Confederacy during the American Civil War. After the war, he led the Redeemers and Red Shirts on a campaign to reestablish Democratic rule South Carolina. At the end of the Reconstruction era he became Governor and then U.S. Senator from South Carolina.

The county had a peak of population in 1910, when agriculture was still the mainstay of the economy. Thousands of African Americans left after that for urban areas, especially in the North, in the Great Migration. The mechanization of agriculture reduced farm jobs.

On April 13, 2020, a powerful EF4 tornado devastated several communities within Hampton County, with the worst damage occurring in Estill and Nixville. Over 30 houses were destroyed, and 5 people were killed with another 60 sustaining injuries from the tornado.

== Geography ==
According to the U.S. Census Bureau, the county has a total area of 562.71 square miles (1,457.4 km^{2}), of which 559.98 square miles (1,450.3 km^{2}) is land and 2.73 square miles (7.1 km^{2}) (0.49%) is water.

=== National protected area ===
- Ernest F. Hollings ACE Basin National Wildlife Refuge (part)

=== State and local protected areas ===
- Hamilton Ridge Wildlife Management Area
- James W Webb Wildlife Center and Game Management Area
- Lake Warren State Park
- Palachucola Wildlife Management Area
- Webb Wildlife Center

=== Major water bodies ===
- Coosawhatchie River
- Lake George Warren
- Little Salkehatchie River
- Salkehatchie River
- Savannah River

=== Adjacent counties ===
- Bamberg County – north
- Colleton County – east
- Beaufort County – southeast
- Jasper County – south
- Effingham County, Georgia – southwest
- Screven County, Georgia – west
- Allendale County – northwest

=== Major highways ===
- I-95
- US 21
- US 17 Alt.
- US 278
- US 321
- US 601
- SC 3
- SC 63
- SC 68
- SC 333
- SC 363

=== Major infrastructure ===
- Yemassee Station

== Demographics ==
Historical population
Census	Pop.	Note	%±
1880	18,741		—
1890	20,544		9.6%
1900	23,738		15.5%
1910	25,126		5.8%
1920	19,550		−22.2%
1930	17,243		−11.8%
1940	17,465		1.3%
1950	18,027		3.2%
1960	17,425		−3.3%
1970	15,878		−8.9%
1980	18,159		14.4%
1990	18,191		0.2%
2000	21,386		17.6%
2010	21,090		−1.4%
2020	18,561		−12.0%
2025 (est.)	18,174	▼	−2.1%
U.S. Decennial Census; 1790–1960 1900–1990; 1990–2000 2010 2020

=== Racial and ethnic composition ===
Hampton County, South Carolina – Racial and ethnic composition Note: the US Census treats Hispanic/Latino as an ethnic category. This table excludes Latinos from the racial categories and assigns them to a separate category. Hispanics/Latinos may be of any race.
Race / Ethnicity (NH = Non-Hispanic)	Pop 1980	Pop 1990	Pop 2000	Pop 2010	Pop 2020	% 1980	% 1990	% 2000	% 2010	% 2020
White alone (NH)	8,543	8,253	8,831	8,699	7,802	47.05%	45.37%	41.29%	41.25%	42.03%
Black or African American alone (NH)	9,386	9,844	11,832	11,264	9,536	51.69%	54.11%	55.33%	53.41%	51.38%
Native American or Alaska Native alone (NH)	7	6	39	45	41	0.04%	0.03%	0.18%	0.21%	0.22%
Asian alone (NH)	14	17	36	106	100	0.08%	0.09%	0.17%	0.50%	0.54%
Native Hawaiian or Pacific Islander alone (NH)	x	x	1	7	17	x	x	0.00%	0.03%	0.09%
Other race alone (NH)	12	0	14	14	40	0.07%	0.00%	0.07%	0.07%	0.22%
Mixed race or Multiracial (NH)	x	x	86	211	359	x	x	0.40%	1.00%	1.93%
Hispanic or Latino (any race)	197	71	547	744	666	1.08%	0.39%	2.56%	3.53%	3.59%
Total	18,159	18,191	21,386	21,090	18,561	100.00%	100.00%	100.00%	100.00%	100.00%

=== 2020 census ===
As of the 2020 census, there were 18,561 people, 7,183 households, and 4,148 families residing in the county. The median age was 43.0 years, 20.8% of residents were under the age of 18, and 19.8% of residents were 65 years of age or older. For every 100 females there were 102.4 males, and for every 100 females age 18 and over there were 101.6 males age 18 and over.

The racial makeup of the county was 43.8% White, 51.7% Black or African American, 0.3% American Indian and Alaska Native, 0.5% Asian, 0.1% Native Hawaiian and Pacific Islander, 1.2% from some other race, and 2.3% from two or more races. Hispanic or Latino residents of any race comprised 3.6% of the population.

0.0% of residents lived in urban areas, while 100.0% lived in rural areas.

There were 7,183 households in the county, of which 30.2% had children under the age of 18 living with them and 36.5% had a female householder with no spouse or partner present. About 31.5% of all households were made up of individuals and 15.0% had someone living alone who was 65 years of age or older.

There were 8,584 housing units, of which 16.3% were vacant. Among occupied housing units, 73.6% were owner-occupied and 26.4% were renter-occupied. The homeowner vacancy rate was 1.7% and the rental vacancy rate was 10.6%.

=== 2010 census ===
At the 2010 census, there were 21,090 people, 7,598 households, and 5,211 families living in the county. The population density was 37.7 inhabitants per square mile (14.6/km^{2}). There were 9,140 housing units at an average density of 16.3 per square mile (6.3/km^{2}). The racial makeup of the county was 53.9% black or African American, 42.7% white, 0.5% Asian, 0.3% American Indian, 1.3% from other races, and 1.3% from two or more races. Those of Hispanic or Latino origin made up 3.5% of the population. In terms of ancestry, 6.4% were Irish, 6.3% were American, 5.6% were German, and 5.3% were English.

Of the 7,598 households, 35.8% had children under the age of 18 living with them, 44.0% were married couples living together, 19.1% had a female householder with no husband present, 31.4% were non-families, and 28.1% of all households were made up of individuals. The average household size was 2.57 and the average family size was 3.15. The median age was 38.4 years.

The median income for a household in the county was $34,846 and the median income for a family was $43,234. Males had a median income of $31,935 versus $26,826 for females. The per capita income for the county was $16,262. About 17.2% of families and 20.8% of the population were below the poverty line, including 27.9% of those under age 18 and 19.7% of those age 65 or over.

=== 2000 census ===
At the 2000 census, there were 21,386 people, 7,444 households, and 5,315 families living in the county. The population density was 38 people per square mile (15 people/km^{2}). There were 8,582 housing units at an average density of 15 per square mile (5.8/km^{2}). The racial makeup of the county was 55.67% Black or African American, 42.89% White, 0.20% Native American, 0.17% Asian, 0.01% Pacific Islander, 0.62% from other races, and 0.43% from two or more races. 2.56% of the population were Hispanic or Latino of any race.

There were 7,444 households, out of which 34.60% had children under the age of 18 living with them, 47.90% were married couples living together, 18.80% had a female householder with no husband present, and 28.60% were non-families. 25.80% of all households were made up of individuals, and 11.20% had someone living alone who was 65 years of age or older. The average household size was 2.64 and the average family size was 3.19.

In the county, the population was spread out, with 27.60% under the age of 18, 8.50% from 18 to 24, 29.70% from 25 to 44, 22.10% from 45 to 64, and 12.10% who were 65 years of age or older. The median age was 35 years. For every 100 females there were 103.80 males. For every 100 females age 18 and over, there were 103.90 males.

The median income for a household in the county was $28,771, and the median income for a family was $34,559. Males had a median income of $29,440 versus $20,418 for females. The per capita income for the county was $13,129. About 17.80% of families and 21.80% of the population were below the poverty line, including 27.60% of those under age 18 and 21.70% of those age 65 or over.

== Government and politics ==
Like most majority African American counties, Hampton is a Democratic stronghold, having not been won by a Republican presidential candidate since Nixon in 1972. The margin has been narrowing in recent elections, however, with Kamala Harris' 2024 performance being the worst by a Democrat since 1984.

United States presidential election results for Hampton County, South Carolina
Year	Republican		Democratic		Third party(ies)	
Year	No.	%	No.	%	No.	%
1900	1	0.11%	936	99.89%	0	0.00%
1904	0	0.00%	1,079	100.00%	0	0.00%
1912	0	0.00%	631	100.00%	0	0.00%
1916	0	0.00%	852	100.00%	0	0.00%
1920	0	0.00%	623	100.00%	0	0.00%
1924	3	0.41%	730	99.05%	4	0.54%
1928	19	1.70%	1,098	98.30%	0	0.00%
1932	18	1.00%	1,782	99.00%	0	0.00%
1936	8	0.63%	1,253	99.37%	0	0.00%
1940	24	1.96%	1,198	98.04%	0	0.00%
1944	3	0.35%	575	67.65%	272	32.00%
1948	10	0.62%	81	4.99%	1,531	94.39%
1952	1,633	67.48%	787	32.52%	0	0.00%
1956	359	17.46%	564	27.43%	1,133	55.11%
1960	1,322	62.59%	790	37.41%	0	0.00%
1964	2,259	61.09%	1,439	38.91%	0	0.00%
1968	1,671	31.95%	2,107	40.29%	1,452	27.76%
1972	2,891	57.56%	2,086	41.53%	46	0.92%
1976	1,773	30.99%	3,923	68.56%	26	0.45%
1980	2,217	33.58%	4,329	65.56%	57	0.86%
1984	3,464	47.92%	3,736	51.69%	28	0.39%
1988	2,826	44.81%	3,435	54.47%	45	0.71%
1992	2,402	32.63%	4,332	58.85%	627	8.52%
1996	2,111	28.85%	4,828	65.98%	378	5.17%
2000	2,798	36.06%	4,896	63.10%	65	0.84%
2004	3,097	38.64%	4,832	60.28%	87	1.09%
2008	3,439	36.78%	5,816	62.20%	95	1.02%
2012	3,312	35.98%	5,834	63.37%	60	0.65%
2016	3,488	39.61%	5,170	58.71%	148	1.68%
2020	3,906	41.98%	5,323	57.21%	76	0.82%
2024	3,801	46.17%	4,328	52.57%	104	1.26%

== Economy ==
In 2022, the GDP was $542.4 million (about $29,930 per capita), and the real GDP was $431.3 million (about $23,798 per capita) in chained 2017 dollars. In 2022 through 2023, the average unemployment rate has been 2.8-2.9%.

Some of the largest employers in the county include the United States Department of Justice, Food Lion, Hampton Regional Medical Center, and Le Creuset.

Employment and Wage Statistics by Industry in Hampton County, South Carolina - Q3 2023
Industry	Employment Counts	Employment Percentage (%)	Average Annual Wage ($)
Accommodation and Food Services	357	8.6	17,940
Administrative and Support and Waste Management and Remediation Services	63	1.5	31,772
Agriculture, Forestry, Fishing and Hunting	323	7.8	67,860
Construction	239	5.8	56,888
Finance and Insurance	77	1.9	40,768
Health Care and Social Assistance	679	16.4	40,300
Manufacturing	448	10.8	58,968
Other Services (except Public Administration)	151	3.6	36,504
Professional, Scientific, and Technical Services	114	2.7	70,356
Public Administration	595	14.3	52,780
Real Estate and Rental and Leasing	19	0.5	43,368
Retail Trade	538	13.0	25,272
Transportation and Warehousing	186	4.5	63,544
Utilities	23	0.6	84,968
Wholesale Trade	336	8.1	62,296
Total	4,148	100.0%	46,987

== Communities ==
=== Towns ===
- Brunson
- Estill
- Furman
- Gifford
- Hampton (county seat and largest community)
- Luray
- Scotia
- Varnville
- Yemassee (partly in Beaufort County)

=== Unincorporated communities ===
- Crocketville
- Early Branch
- Fechtig
- Lena
- McPhersonville
- Nixville

== See also ==
- Hampton County High School
- List of counties in South Carolina
- National Register of Historic Places listings in Hampton County, South Carolina
