= Hampton, South Carolina =

- Town
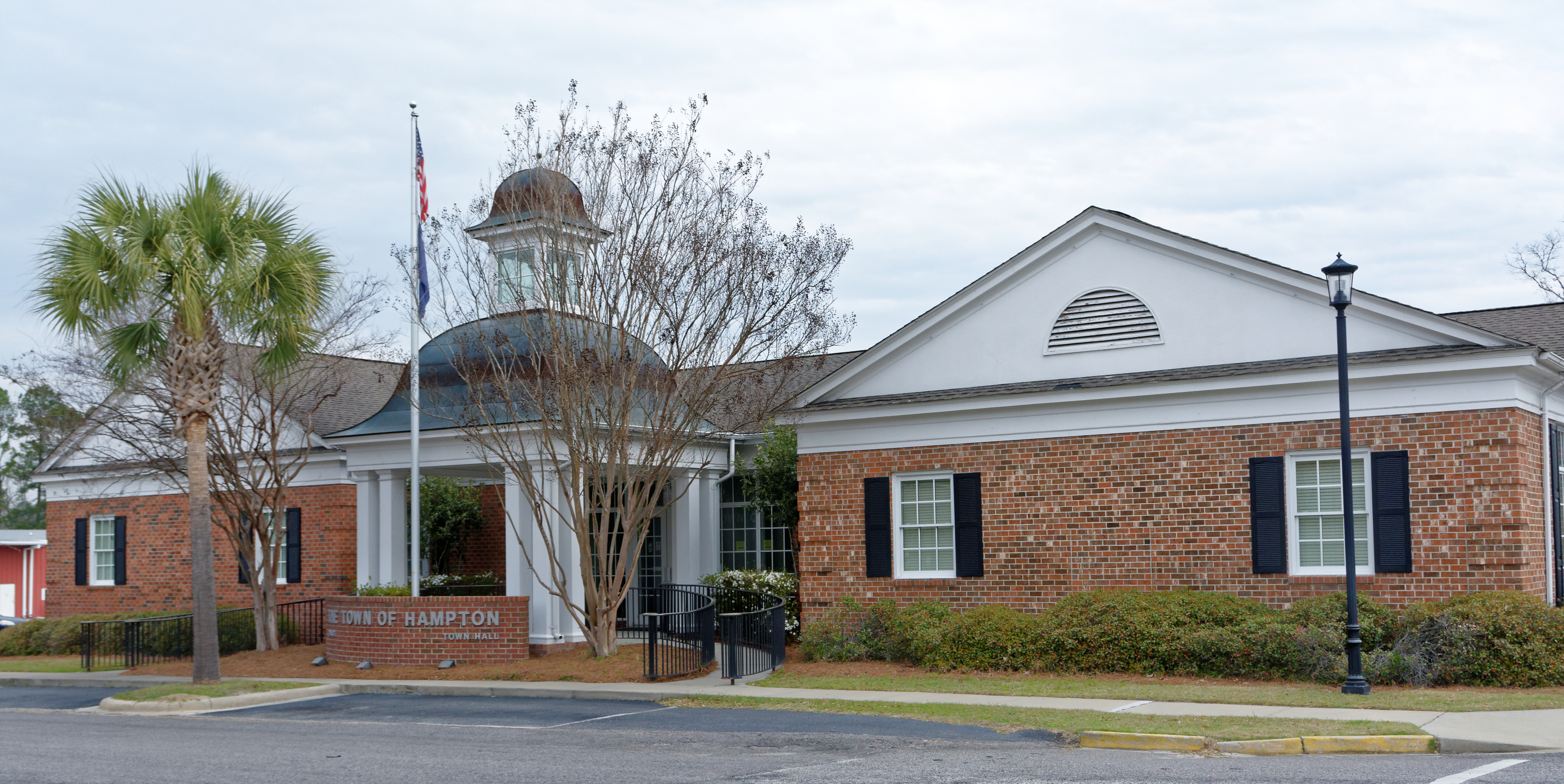
- Town Hall

- Seal

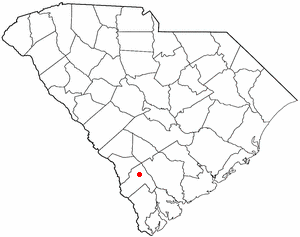
- Location of Hampton, South Carolina
- Coordinates: 32°52′30″N 81°06′42″W
- Country: United States
- State: South Carolina
- County: Hampton

Area
  - Total: 4.53 sq mi (11.72 km^{2})
  - Land: 4.51 sq mi (11.69 km^{2})
  - Water: 0.015 sq mi (0.04 km^{2})
- Elevation: 108 ft (33 m)

Population (2020)
  - Total: 2,694
  - Density: 597/sq mi (230.5/km^{2})
- Time zone: UTC-5 (Eastern (EST))
  - Summer (DST): UTC-4 (EDT)
- ZIP codes: 29913, 29924
- Area codes: 803, 839
- FIPS code: 45-31885
- GNIS feature ID: 2406641
- Website: www.hamptonsc.gov

Hampton is a town in Hampton County, South Carolina, United States. The population was 2,694 at the 2020 census. It is the county seat of Hampton County. The town and the county are named after Wade Hampton III, a Confederate general in the Civil War.

== History ==
Hampton County was created from northwestern portions of Beaufort County in 1878 by the South Carolina General Assembly. In appreciation for helping to end the Reconstruction Era and leading the Democratic Party, the county was named after the sitting governor, Wade Hampton III. Upon creation of the county, the town of Hampton Courthouse was incorporated the following year to serve as the county seat. The U.S. Postal Service would later shorten the name to Hampton. The location was chosen based on the midpoint location of the Port Royal Railroad between Augusta, Georgia, and Port Royal, in hopes to spur economic development. The town was laid out in an orderly grid pattern, with streets running northeast/southwest being named after trees and streets running northwest/southeast being numbered. The central three-block main street which ran between the courthouse block and the rail depot was named Lee Avenue.

Hampton prospered due to its connections with local agricultural fields and became an important depot along the railway. However, the town remained small, though an influx of activity occurred in World War II when a Prisoner-of-War camp was opened near the town. Additional economic development came in the form of industry, with Plywoods-Plastic opening a major facility northwest of town for pulp production. Over time, the company was acquired by Westinghouse and International Paper. IP sold the site to Nevamar, and the facility remained one of the county's largest employers until its closure in late 2014.

In recent years, auto-oriented commercial development was focused on the outskirts of town, leaving the original downtown without much activity. The town of Hampton has attempted to bring back commercial and civic activity to Lee Avenue and has undergone a multi-phased streetscape project, which has rendered some success in luring back businesses to downtown. Hampton County also completed renovations to its historic courthouse in 2012, choosing to remain in downtown Hampton.

The American Legion Hut, Bank of Hampton, Hampton Colored School, Hampton County Courthouse, and Palmetto Theatre are listed on the National Register of Historic Places.

== Geography ==
Hampton is located in north-central Hampton County. It is bordered to the southeast by the town of Varnville. U.S. Route 278 passes through the center of Hampton as Elm Street; the highway leads northwest 10 miles (16 km) to Fairfax and southeast through Varnville 30 miles (48 km) to Ridgeland. U.S. Route 601 enters Hampton from the south as First Street and leaves to the north on Hoover Street. 601 leads north 32 miles (51 km) to Bamberg and south 23 miles (37 km) to its terminus at US 321 near Tarboro.

According to the United States Census Bureau, the town of Hampton has a total area of 4.5 square miles (11.7 km^{2}), of which 0.02 square miles (0.04 km^{2}), or 0.31%, are water.

=== Climate ===
Hampton has a humid subtropical climate typical of South Carolina, with average monthly temperatures ranging from 50.5 °F (10.3 °C) in January to 82.3 °F (27.9 °C) in July.

Climate data for HAMPTON 1S (1951-2005)
Month	Jan	Feb	Mar	Apr	May	Jun	Jul	Aug	Sep	Oct	Nov	Dec	Year
Record high °F (°C)	83.0 (28.3)	85.0 (29.4)	93.0 (33.9)	95.0 (35.0)	100.0 (37.8)	105.0 (40.6)	107.0 (41.7)	106.0 (41.1)	102.0 (38.9)	97.0 (36.1)	89.0 (31.7)	83.0 (28.3)	107.0 (41.7)
Mean daily maximum °F (°C)	61.9 (16.6)	65.5 (18.6)	72.4 (22.4)	79.2 (26.2)	85.6 (29.8)	90.1 (32.3)	92.2 (33.4)	90.7 (32.6)	86.5 (30.3)	78.9 (26.1)	70.4 (21.3)	63.9 (17.7)	78.1 (25.6)
Daily mean °F (°C)	50.5 (10.3)	53.6 (12.0)	59.9 (15.5)	66.7 (19.3)	73.8 (23.2)	79.6 (26.4)	82.3 (27.9)	81.1 (27.3)	76.7 (24.8)	67.6 (19.8)	58.6 (14.8)	52.5 (11.4)	66.9 (19.4)
Mean daily minimum °F (°C)	39.2 (4.0)	41.7 (5.4)	47.4 (8.6)	54.1 (12.3)	61.9 (16.6)	69.1 (20.6)	72.3 (22.4)	71.5 (21.9)	66.9 (19.4)	56.3 (13.5)	46.9 (8.3)	41.2 (5.1)	55.7 (13.2)
Record low °F (°C)	1.0 (−17.2)	12.0 (−11.1)	16.0 (−8.9)	29.0 (−1.7)	37.0 (2.8)	47.0 (8.3)	54.0 (12.2)	55.0 (12.8)	37.0 (2.8)	23.0 (−5.0)	11.0 (−11.7)	8.0 (−13.3)	1.0 (−17.2)
Average precipitation inches (mm)	3.76 (96)	3.09 (78)	3.76 (96)	3.32 (84)	2.49 (63)	5.28 (134)	4.80 (122)	5.89 (150)	4.15 (105)	2.99 (76)	3.05 (77)	2.67 (68)	45.25 (1,149)
Average snowfall inches (cm)	0.0 (0.0)	0.0 (0.0)	0.0 (0.0)	0.0 (0.0)	0.0 (0.0)	0.0 (0.0)	0.0 (0.0)	0.0 (0.0)	0.0 (0.0)	0.0 (0.0)	0.0 (0.0)	0.1 (0.25)	0.1 (0.25)
Average precipitation days (≥ 0.01 in)	10.0	7.8	9.6	8.2	7.2	12.0	11.8	12.2	8.8	7.5	7.5	8.7	111.3
Average snowy days (≥ 0.1 in)	0.0	0.0	0.0	0.0	0.0	0.0	0.0	0.0	0.0	0.0	0.0	0.1	0.1
Source: ClimateAtlas

== Culture ==
Two months prior to the founding of the town, the Hampton County Guardian began printing, and continues to be the paper of record for Hampton and the remainder of the county. It is one of the oldest and longest-running newspapers in South Carolina.

Since 1939, Hampton has hosted the annual Hampton County Watermelon Festival, held in the third week of June. The weeklong festival features such events as a watermelon judging contest and a watermelon eating contest. The main event of the festival is the parade held on Saturday that runs from Varnville to Hampton. As of 2015, the Watermelon Festival is South Carolina's longest continually running festival.

== Demographics ==
Historical population
Census	Pop.	Note	%±
1880	169		—
1890	318		88.2%
1900	536		68.6%
1910	748		39.6%
1920	706		−5.6%
1930	811		14.9%
1940	997		22.9%
1950	2,007		101.3%
1960	2,486		23.9%
1970	2,966		19.3%
1980	3,143		6.0%
1990	2,997		−4.6%
2000	2,837		−5.3%
2010	2,808		−1.0%
2020	2,694		−4.1%
U.S. Decennial Census

=== 2020 census ===
Hampton racial composition
Race	Num.	Perc.
White (non-Hispanic)	1,217	45.17%
Black or African American (non-Hispanic)	1,295	48.07%
Native American	2	0.07%
Asian	61	2.26%
Other/Mixed	69	2.56%
Hispanic or Latino	50	1.86%

As of the 2020 United States census, there were 2,694 people, 1,139 households, and 595 families residing in the town.

=== 2000 census ===
As of the census of 2000, there were 2,837 people (2,795 in 2004 estimate), 1,178 households, and 775 families residing in the town. The population density was 626.1 inhabitants per square mile (241.7/km^{2}). There were 1,339 housing units at an average density of 295.5 per square mile (114.1/km^{2}). The racial makeup of the town was 55.30% White, 42.44% African American, 0.28% Native American, 0.53% Asian, 0.78% from other races, and 0.67% from two or more races. Hispanic or Latino of any race were 0.81% of the population.

There were 1,178 households, out of which 30.5% had children under the age of 18 living with them, 44.7% were married couples living together, 18.2% had a female householder with no husband present, and 34.2% were non-families. 30.9% of all households were made up of individuals, and 14.6% had someone living alone who was 65 years of age or older. The average household size was 2.40 and the average family size was 3.01.

In the town, the population was spread out, with 26.9% under the age of 18, 7.8% from 18 to 24, 26.2% from 25 to 44, 23.2% from 45 to 64, and 16.0% who were 65 years of age or older. The median age was 38 years. For every 100 females, there were 83.9 males. For every 100 females age 18 and over, there were 75.3 males.

The median income for a household in the town was $30,650, and the median income for a family was $40,688. Males had a median income of $31,625 versus $21,250 for females. The per capita income for the town was $17,326. About 15.2% of families and 18.9% of the population were below the poverty line, including 26.4% of those under age 18 and 17.7% of those age 65 or over.

== Education ==
Public education in Hampton is provided by Hampton County School District 1. Students attend the following schools:

- Ben Hazel Primary School
- Bubba's Virtual Learning
- Brunson Elementary School
- Fennell Elementary School
- Hampton County School District
- North District Middle School
- Varnville Elementary School
- Wade Hampton High School

Patrick Henry Academy, located three miles southwest of downtown Hampton and founded in 1965 as a segregation academy, is a local private school that serves Hampton and Hampton County. The Technical College of the Lowcountry also holds some courses in the county and the Clemson University Extension office offers a variety of courses and programs for local residents and businesses.

Hampton has a public library, a branch of the Allendale Hampton Jasper Regional Library.
