= South Carolina Highway 173 =

State highway in South Carolina, United States

South Carolina Highway 173
- School Street

Route information
- Maintained by SCDOT
- Length: 1.570 mi (2.527 km)
- Existed: 1940–present

Major junctions
- West end: SC 27 in Ridgeville
- East end: US 78 near Ridgeville

Location
- Country: United States
- State: South Carolina
- Counties: Dorchester

Highway system
- South Carolina State Highway System; Interstate; US; State; Scenic
← SC 172	→ SC 174

South Carolina Highway 173 (SC 173) is a 1.570-mile (2.527 km) primary state highway in the U.S. state of South Carolina. It serves to connect the town of Ridgeville with U.S. Route 78 (US 78). It is known as School Street for its entire length.

== Route description ==
SC 173 is a two-lane rural highway that connect the town of Ridgeville northeast to US 78. The predominant features along the route are homes and forest.

== History ==
Established as the second SC 173 in 1940, it traversed from US 15 in Grover east to US 78 near Ridgeville; the section between Ridgeville and US 78 was originally part of SC 27. In 1941 or 1942, it was extended east to SC 31 (current US 176), with an incomplete gap at the Dorchester-Berkeley county line. In 1948, SC 173 was reduced to its current alignment; leaving behind Wire Road/Ridge Road (S-18-19) and Cypress Campground Road (S-8-32).

The first SC 173 was established in 1937 or 1938 as a new primary routing from SC 27, in Ridgeville, north to US 78/SC 2. In 1940, SC 173 and SC 27 switched places.

== Major intersections ==
The entire route is in Dorchester County.

Location	mi	km	Destinations	Notes
Ridgeville	0.00	0.00	SC 27 (Church Street) / School Street west – Givhans, St. George, Givhans Ferry State Park	Western terminus; School Street continues past terminus.
	1.57	2.53	US 78 / Myers–Mayo Road east – Summerville, St. George	Eastern terminus; roadway continues as Myers–Mayo Road.
1.000 mi = 1.609 km; 1.000 km = 0.621 mi
