= National Register of Historic Places listings in Dorchester County, South Carolina =

Location of Dorchester County in South Carolina

This is a list of the National Register of Historic Places listings in Dorchester County, South Carolina.

This is intended to be a complete list of the properties and districts on the National Register of Historic Places in Dorchester County, South Carolina, United States. The locations of National Register properties and districts for which the latitude and longitude coordinates are included below, may be seen in a map.

There are 13 properties and districts listed on the National Register in the county, including 1 National Historic Landmark.

This National Park Service list is complete through NPS recent listings posted May 1, 2026.

== Current listings ==
	Name on the Register	Image	Date listed	Location	City or town	Description
1	Appleby's Methodist Church	Appleby's Methodist Church	February 14, 1978 (#78002505)	Southwest of St. George at the junction of State Highways 19 and 71; 33°08′14″N 80°39′03″W	St. George	
2	Ashley River Historic District	Ashley River Historic District	September 12, 1994 (#93001514)	Roughly along the Ashley River from just east of South Carolina Highway 165 to the Seaboard Coast Line railroad bridge 32°54′45″N 80°07′22″W	Charleston	Extends into Charleston County
3	Ashley River Road	Ashley River Road	November 21, 1983 (#83003831)	South Carolina Highway 61 between Church Creek and South Carolina Highway 165; 32°53′23″N 80°07′15″W	Cooke Crossroads	Extends into Charleston County
4	Carroll Place	Carroll Place	July 25, 1974 (#74001849)	Junction of Quaker and Wire Rds. 33°07′39″N 80°38′08″W	St. George	
5	Cypress Methodist Camp Ground	Cypress Methodist Camp Ground	April 26, 1978 (#78002504)	East of Ridgeville on South Carolina Highway 182; 33°06′18″N 80°10′27″W	Ridgeville	
6	Indian Fields Methodist Campground	Indian Fields Methodist Campground	March 30, 1973 (#73001707)	About 4 miles northeast of St. George on South Carolina Highway 73; 33°13′22″N 80°32′46″W	St. George	
7	Middleton Place	Middleton Place	May 6, 1971 (#71000770)	Southeast of Summerville on U.S. Route 61; 32°54′19″N 80°08′15″W	Summerville	Remnants of an 18th-century rice plantation on the Ashley River; now a museum
8	Newington Plantation		September 17, 1974 (#74001850)	Address Restricted	Stallsville	
9	Old Dorchester	Old Dorchester	December 3, 1969 (#69000165)	6 miles south of Summerville on South Carolina Highway 642; 32°57′01″N 80°10′13″W	Summerville	
10	Old White Meeting House Ruins and Cemetery	Old White Meeting House Ruins and Cemetery	February 8, 2005 (#97000445)	South Carolina Highway 642, approximately 0.5 miles southeast of its junction with South Carolina Highway 165; 32°57′56″N 80°11′41″W	Summerville	
11	St. George Rosenwald School	St. George Rosenwald School	October 2, 2018 (#100003000)	205 Ann St. 33°11′13″N 80°34′57″W	St. George	
12	St. Paul Camp Ground	St. Paul Camp Ground	April 30, 1998 (#98000424)	940 St. Paul Rd. 33°12′17″N 80°28′57″W	Harleyville	
13	Summerville Historic District	Summerville Historic District	May 19, 1976 (#76001701)	Roughly bounded by S. Railroad Ave., Magnolia and Main Sts., and the town boundary 33°00′53″N 80°10′59″W	Summerville	

== See also ==
- List of National Historic Landmarks in South Carolina
- National Register of Historic Places listings in South Carolina
