= South Carolina Highway 27 =

State highway in South Carolina, United States

South Carolina Highway 27

Route information
- Maintained by SCDOT
- Length: 19.511 mi (31.400 km)
- Existed: 1931–present

Major junctions
- South end: SC 61 in Givhans
- US 78 near Ridgeville; I-26 near Ridgeville
- North end: US 176 near Holly Hill

Location
- Country: United States
- State: South Carolina
- Counties: Dorchester, Berkeley

Highway system
- South Carolina State Highway System; Interstate; US; State; Scenic
← I-26	→ SC 28

South Carolina Highway 27 (SC 27) is a 19.511-mile (31.400 km) primary state highway in the U.S. state of South Carolina. It serves to connect the town of Ridgeville with nearby highways.

== Route description ==
SC 27 is a two-lane rural highway that connect the town of Ridgeville south to the unincorporated community of Givhans to its south and highways U.S. Route 78 (US 78), Interstate 26 (I-26), and US 176 to its north. The predominant features along the route are farmland mixed with forest and swamps.

== History ==
Established as the second SC 27 around 1931, it traversed from SC 65 (current SC 61) in Givhans, to US 78 east of Ridgeville. In 1940, it was rerouted north from Ridgeville to US 78 and then spur up to the Berkeley County line. In 1941 or 1942, SC 27 was extended north into Berkeley County to SC 31 (current US 176).

The first SC 27 was an original state highway; established in 1922, it traversed from SC 21 in Trenton, south to Aiken, then east through Williston, Blackville, Denmark, Bamberg, and St. George before ending at SC 2. In 1927, US 78 was assigned on all of SC 27 east of Aiken. In 1928, all of SC 27 was decommissioned, SC 19 replaced the section between Aiken and Trenton.

== Junction list ==
County	Location	mi	km	Destinations	Notes
Dorchester	Givhans	0.000	0.000	SC 61 (Givhans Road) – Bamberg, Charleston	Southern terminus; to Givhans Ferry State Park
Dorchester	Ridgeville	6.540	10.525	SC 173 east (School Street) – Summerville	Western terminus of SC 173
Dorchester		7.840	12.617	US 78 east – Summerville	Southern end of US 78 concurrency
Dorchester		8.328	13.403	US 78 west – St. George	Northern end of US 78 concurrency
Berkeley		9.340– 9.341	15.031– 15.033	I-26 – Charleston, Columbia	I-26 exit 187
Berkeley		19.511	31.400	US 176 (State Road) – Charleston, Holly Hill	Northern terminus
1.000 mi = 1.609 km; 1.000 km = 0.621 mi: Concurrency terminus
