= Hurricane Idalia =

Category 4 Atlantic hurricane in 2023

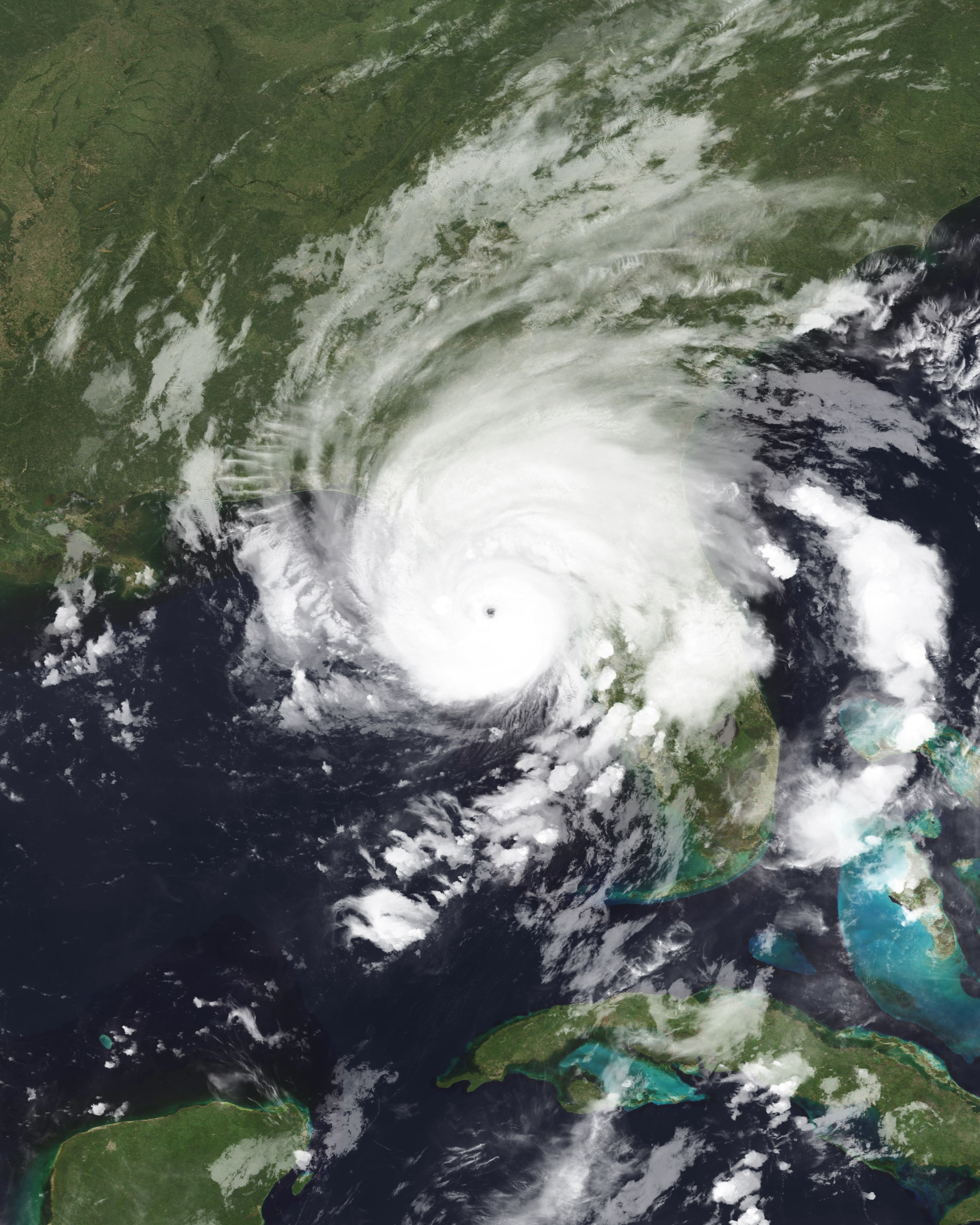
- Idalia at peak intensity while approaching the Big Bend region of Florida on August 30

Meteorological history
- Formed: August 26, 2023
- Post-tropical: August 31, 2023
- Dissipated: September 8, 2023

Category 4 major hurricane
- 1-minute sustained (SSHWS/NWS)
- Highest winds: 130 mph (215 km/h)
- Lowest pressure: 942 mbar (hPa); 27.82 inHg

Overall effects
- Fatalities: 12 (8 direct, 4 indirect)
- Damage: $3.5 billion (2023 USD)
- Areas affected: Yucatán Peninsula, Cayman Islands, Western Cuba, Southeastern United States, Bermuda
- Part of the 2023 Atlantic hurricane season

Hurricane Idalia was a powerful and destructive tropical cyclone that caused significant damage across parts of the southeastern United States, especially North Florida, in late August 2023. The ninth named storm, (Note: This excludes a belatedly recognized and unnamed subtropical storm in January of the same year.) third hurricane, and second major hurricane of the 2023 Atlantic hurricane season, Idalia formed from a low-pressure area that crossed Central America from the eastern Pacific Ocean. Gradual development ensued as it meandered in the western part of the Caribbean Sea; the system was upgraded to a tropical depression on August 26, 2023, and strengthened into a tropical storm a day later, receiving the name Idalia. It traversed the Gulf of Mexico where it underwent rapid intensification, briefly becoming a Category 4 hurricane before weakening and making landfall in the Big Bend region of Florida as a low-end Category 3 hurricane on August 30. Idalia remained a hurricane as it moved through Northern Florida and crossed into Southeast Georgia; it then pushed into the Carolinas as a tropical storm. On August 31, Idalia emerged into the Atlantic, where it transitioned into a post-tropical cyclone that same day. Later, it passed south of Bermuda, made a counterclockwise loop, then meandered off the coast of Nova Scotia while winding down.

Idalia caused significant damage to thousands of homes, businesses, and other infrastructure along its inland path, primarily in Florida, where winds and the resulting floodwaters were highest. Its storm surge was record-breaking from the Big Bend region south to Tampa Bay. In Tampa Bay roads were flooded over, and high waters submerged hundreds of cars. The system also spawned a tornado outbreak with around 12 confirmed tornadoes. Idalia was the most powerful hurricane to hit Florida's Big Bend region since Hurricane Easy in 1950. Five people died in storm-related incidents in the two states. The NCEI estimates that Hurricane Idalia was responsible for $3.5 billion in damages. The hurricane's remnants produced dangerous rip currents across the Eastern United States during Labor Day Weekend, resulting in several additional deaths and numerous rescues.

== Meteorological history ==
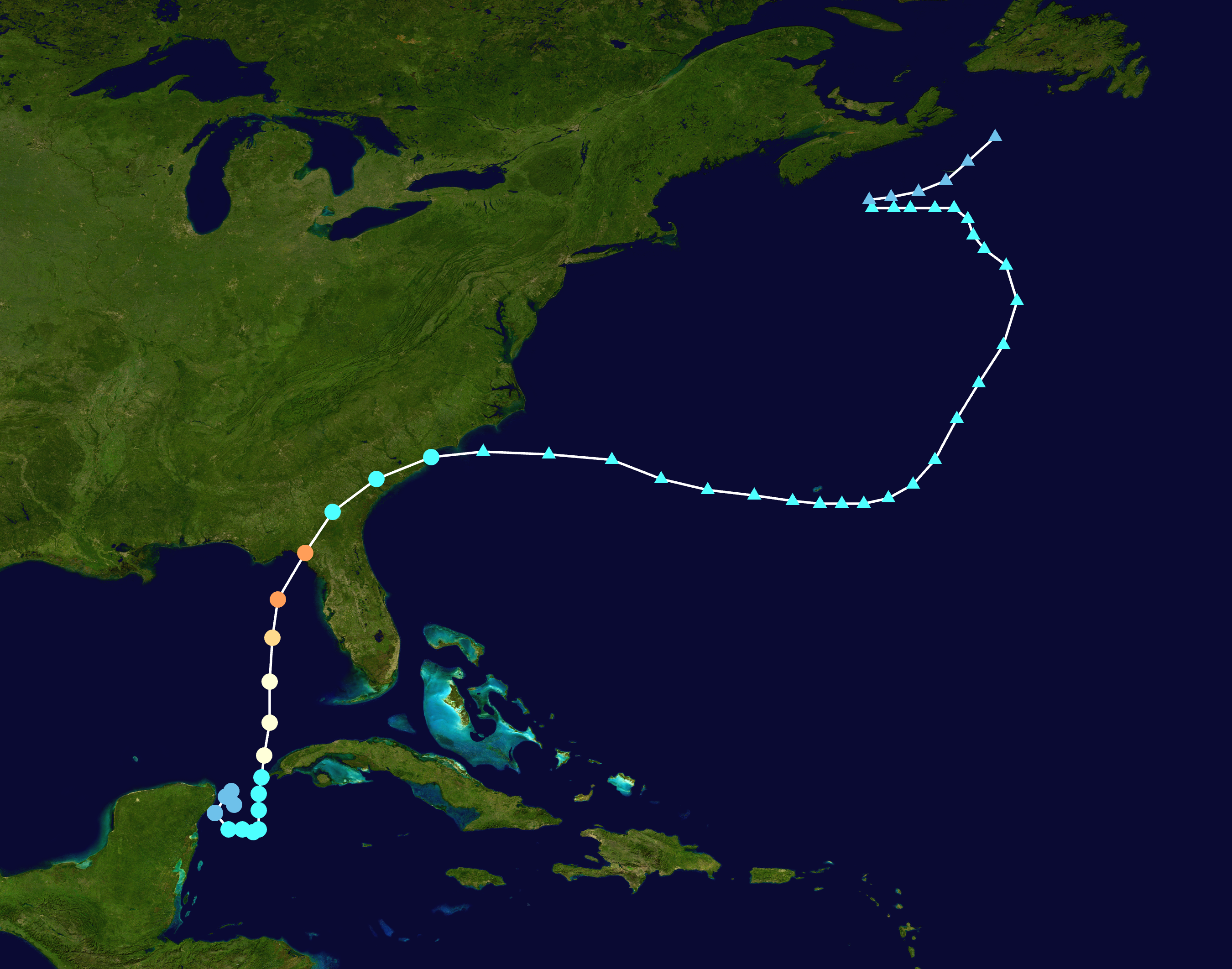
Map plotting the storm's track and intensity, according to the Saffir–Simpson scale (Note: The position of Idalia's Category 4 peak intensity is not depicted in this graphic as it is an asynoptic point (i.e. not at the 6-hour intervals of all other points) occurring at 09:00 UTC August 30.) Map key Saffir–Simpson scale Tropical depression (≤38 mph, ≤62 km/h) Tropical storm (39–73 mph, 63–118 km/h) Category 1 (74–95 mph, 119–153 km/h) Category 2 (96–110 mph, 154–177 km/h) Category 3 (111–129 mph, 178–208 km/h) Category 4 (130–156 mph, 209–251 km/h) Category 5 (≥157 mph, ≥252 km/h) Unknown Storm type Tropical cyclone Subtropical cyclone Extratropical cyclone, remnant low, tropical disturbance, or monsoon depression

On August 24, 2023, a trough of low pressure formed in the Eastern Pacific basin offshore of the Central America coast. The disturbance crossed over into the Atlantic basin the following day, and began to organize as it moved northward through the western Caribbean Sea. The pace of organization quickened on August 26, while the disturbance was located near the northeastern Yucatán Peninsula, and at 21:00 UTC it was upgraded to Tropical Depression Ten. Later that day, and into the next, the depression drifted due to weak surrounding steering currents, with its center moving in a small counterclockwise loop. The depression became Tropical Storm Idalia at 15:15 UTC on August 27, after a NOAA Hurricane Hunters flight reported that the storm's winds had increased to 40 mph (65 km/h). Early the next morning, Idalia began moving northward toward the Yucatán Channel west of Cuba, intensifying along the way despite being impacted by moderate northwesterly wind shear.

Idalia attaining Category 4 intensity and making landfall early on August 30

By 09:00 UTC on August 29, after passing near the western tip of Cuba, Idalia had developed an inner core and almost complete eyewall and the NHC upgraded the storm to a Category 1 hurricane. Later that day, Idalia began to rapidly intensify, reaching Category 2 strength as it benefited from exceptional conditions, with sea-surface temperatures of 88 °F (31 °C), generally low wind shear, and high relative humidity levels. Idalia continued to rapidly intensify as it accelerated northward off the Florida Suncoast and approached the Big Bend region, reaching its peak intensity of Category 4 strength on the morning of August 30, a few hours prior to landfall, with maximum sustained winds of 130 mph (215 km/h) and a minimum central pressure of 942 mbar (27.82 inHg). This marked a wind increase of 55 mph (89 km/h) during the 24 hour period ending at 09:00 UTC on August 30, making it one of fastest rates of tropical cyclone intensification ever observed in the Atlantic basin 24 hours before landfall. At its peak, the NHC described the system as having "a small eye surrounded by very cold clouds tops, especially in the western quadrant". Idalia's intensification was then halted by an eyewall replacement cycle, which caused it to weaken prior to landfall. Idalia made landfall at 11:45 UTC, about 20 miles (30 km) south of Perry, Florida, as a Category 3 hurricane, with sustained winds of 115 mph (185 km/h) and a minimum central pressure of 950 mbar (28.05 inHg).

The system quickly weakened inland as it pushed through North Florida, becoming a tropical storm later that day after crossing into Georgia. Strong southwesterly wind shear then pushed the storm's convection well north and east of its center as it moved off the northeastern South Carolina coast and emerged into the Atlantic Ocean on the morning of August 31. That afternoon, Idalia transitioned into a post-tropical cyclone about 65 miles (105 km) southeast of Cape Hatteras, North Carolina. As the storm moved to the east-southeast the following day, light wind shear along its path enabled the system to maintain its structure and intensity despite the lack of convection. The storm impacted Bermuda with tropical-storm-force winds on September 2, as it passed just to the south. Idalia's remnant low then absorbed Tropical Storm Gert on September 4 and lingered off the coast of Atlantic Canada for several days, before dissipating on September 8.

== Preparations ==
=== Cuba ===
More than 10,000 people were evacuated from Pinar del Río and Artemisa provinces. Patients in Bahía Honda were evacuated to a local clinic after fearing flooding.

=== United States ===
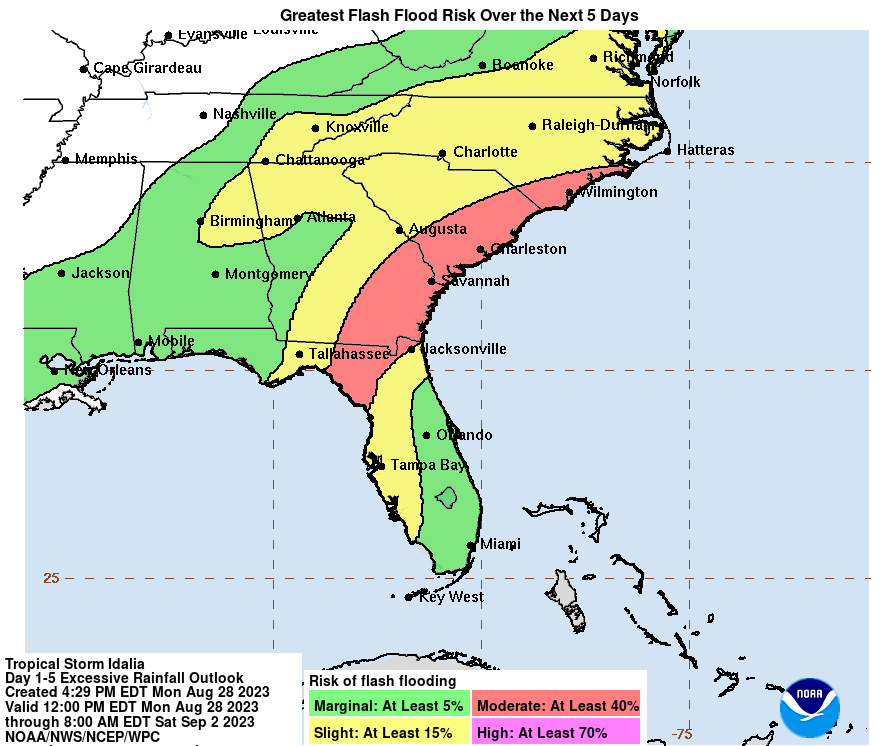
The Weather Prediction Center's Excessive Rainfall Outlook for Tropical Storm Idalia

On August 28, hurricane warnings and storm surge warnings were issued for portions of the Florida's west coast. On August 29, the Storm Prediction Center issued a Day 1 convective outlook highlighting a level 2/slight risk of severe weather for portions of Florida associated with Idalia, with the SPC also issuing a 5 percent tornado risk. A Day 2 convective outlook was also issued concerning a level 2/slight risk and a 5 percent tornado risk for portions of Florida, Georgia, South Carolina, and North Carolina. A moderate risk of excessive rainfall was also issued by the Weather Prediction Center, for most of the same areas included in the Day 2 Convective outlook. A tornado watch was issued for portions of western Florida on August 29, as bands of thunderstorms from Idalia moved inland.

Amtrak terminated its two southbound Silver Service routes in Jacksonville, Florida on August 28 and cancelled both routes and its Auto Train service from August 29 to 30. The Palmetto route was truncated to Washington D.C. as well. At least 900 flights were cancelled across Florida and Georgia.

==== Florida ====
On August 26, 33 Florida counties were placed under a state of emergency (SOE) by Governor Ron DeSantis. Two days later, the governor declared 13 more counties, including some in Northeast Florida, under a SOE. School districts across numerous counties in the state were to close, and 18 colleges, along with 6 universities, including University of South Florida, University of Central Florida, North Florida College, Florida State University, and University of Florida were to be closed starting August 29. Emergency shelters were opened across the state, and the ports along Florida's west coast, including Port Tampa Bay, SeaPort Manatee, and Port of St. Petersburg, began clearing waterways and secured items. The South Florida Water Management District and the Lake Worth Drainage District began draining water from canal systems. The Howard Frankland Bridge began to secure barges. Tampa International Airport, Sarasota–Bradenton International Airport, Tallahassee International Airport, and St. Pete–Clearwater International Airport closed to all commercial flights on August 29. American Airlines suspended operations at Tampa, Sarasota, Tallahassee, and Gainesville airports. Canaveral National Seashore was shut down ahead of the hurricane. An executive order declaring a local state of emergency was issued for the city of Tampa. Mandatory evacuations began in Pinellas County on August 28. Dry Tortugas National Park was closed in anticipation of the approaching tropical storm. The USA's National Reconnaissance Office (NRO) "Silent Barker" mission by United Launch Alliance (ULA) from Cape Canaveral Space Force Station was put back from its intended August 29 launch date, with the Atlas V rocket taken back to the vertical integration facility (VIF). The Federal Aviation Administration rerouted planes and closed Gulf routes, and the Urban Search and Rescue teams, consisting of nearly 600 search-and-rescue personnel, were activated in Florida. At least 200 Starlink internet devices were deployed in preparation of service disruptions.

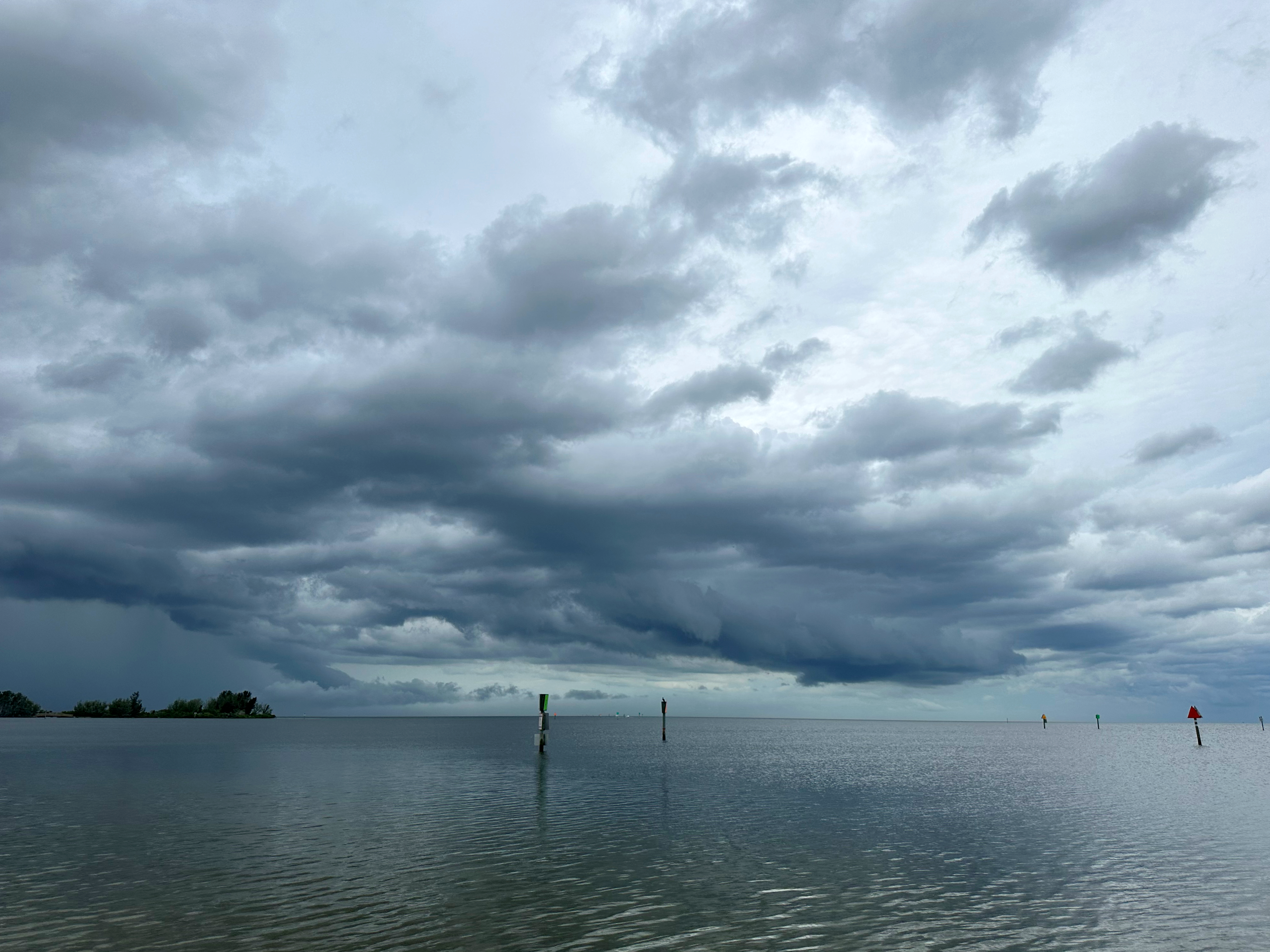
The first rain band of Hurricane Idalia approaching Hudson Beach, Florida on August 29

At least 1,100 Florida National Guard members were mobilized, and 2,400 high-water vehicles, along with 12 aircraft, were also dispatched for recovery and rescue efforts. The Florida Department of Law Enforcement was ready to deploy 25 law enforcement officers, two mobile staging units, one mobile command vehicle, and one operational command center, and to support the State Emergency Operations Center, which was activated in western Florida. President Joe Biden approved an emergency declaration for Florida, and authorized the Federal Emergency Management Agency to coordinate with disaster relief efforts.

==== Elsewhere ====
Georgia Governor Brian Kemp declared a state of emergency and activated the state of emergency operations center on August 29. School districts, including districts across Montgomery, Telfair, Toombs, and Wheeler counties, were closed. Hurricane warnings were in effect for seven Georgia counties. Atlanta Motor Speedway opened their campgrounds to hurricane evacuees free of charge. South Carolina Governor Henry McMaster declared a state of emergency on August 30. Congaree National Park was closed ahead of the approaching hurricane. Charleston International Airport suspended service from 6pm on August 30 to 8am on August 31. Over 80 flights were canceled at Charlotte Douglas International Airport in North Carolina due to the approaching storm, mainly flights to and from Florida. Charlotte Motor Speedway opened their campgrounds to hurricane evacuees free of charge.

=== Bermuda ===
A tropical storm watch was issued for Bermuda on August 30; this was later changed to a warning as the storm moved closer. This occurred just days after Hurricane Franklin produced tropical storm force winds to the island.

== Impact ==
=== Caribbean ===
Costliest Non-retired Hurricanes
Rank	Cyclone	Season	Damage
1	Sally	2020	$7.3 billion
2	Isaias	2020	$5.02 billion
3	Imelda	2019	$5.0 billion
4	Debby	2024	$4.5 billion
5	Zeta	2020	$4.4 billion
6	Karl	2010	$3.9 billion
7	Idalia	2023	$3.6 billion
8	Isaac	2012	$3.11 billion
9	Delta	2020	$3.09 billion
10	Lee	2011	$2.8 billion

The storm brought heavy rainfall to the Yucatán Peninsula. As Idalia became a tropical storm, Cayman Islands were lashed with rough seas, waves up to 6 feet (1.8 m). The islands also received cooler weather. Flooding occurred in Güira de Melena and Guanimar in Cuba, and high winds hit Pinar del Río Province. Rainfall reached 4 inches (100 mm) across portions of the country.

=== United States ===
As of September 25, assessed damage reached $704.1 million across Florida and Georgia. In Florida, at least 21,252 insurance claims were made with losses totaling $216.1 million. Agricultural losses reached $447 million in the state. Damage in Georgia exceeded $41 million. Estimates of total damage across the Southeastern United States vary widely from various insurance companies and catastrophe modelers. Early calculations showed possibilities of damage exceeding $9 billion and potentially reaching $20 billion, though these tempered as time passed. On September 4, Moody's Analytics reported private insured losses at $3–5 billion with a "best estimate" of $3.5 billion. They indicated losses attached to the National Flood Insurance Program would reach $500 million. Verisk Analytics placed the same metric at $2.5–4 billion. Karen Clark & Co. estimated losses at $2.2 billion on September 1. Of this, $2 billion was from wind-related damage and $210 million from storm surge. Regularly improving building codes across Florida are attributed with lesser damage as structures are more able to withstand the effects of hurricanes. Homes built on stilts and with properly secured roofs suffered minimal damage while older structures were severely affected.

At least twelve people were killed in incidents related to the hurricane: four in Florida, three in New Jersey and North Carolina, and one each in Delaware and Georgia.

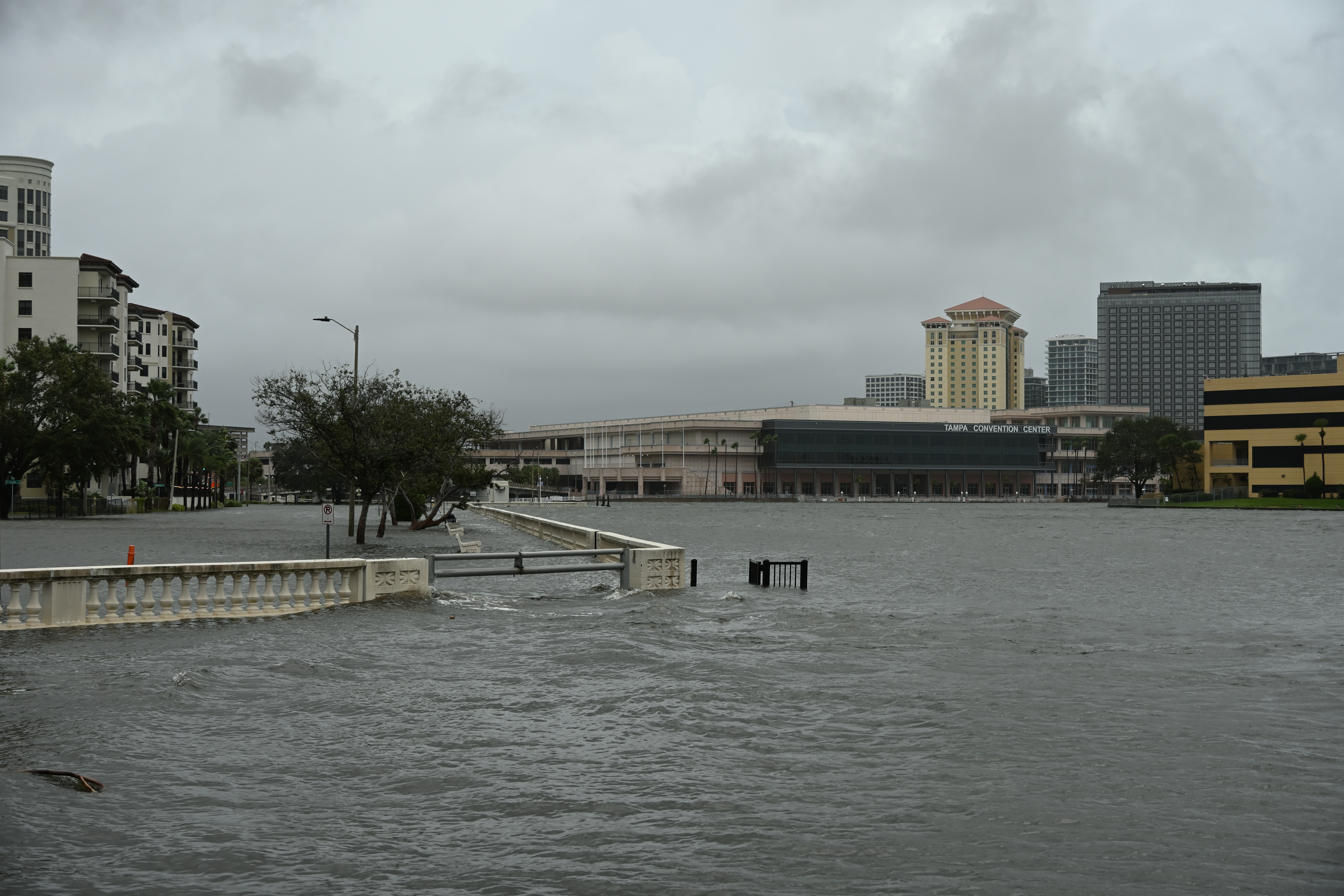
Flooding caused by storm surge in Tampa

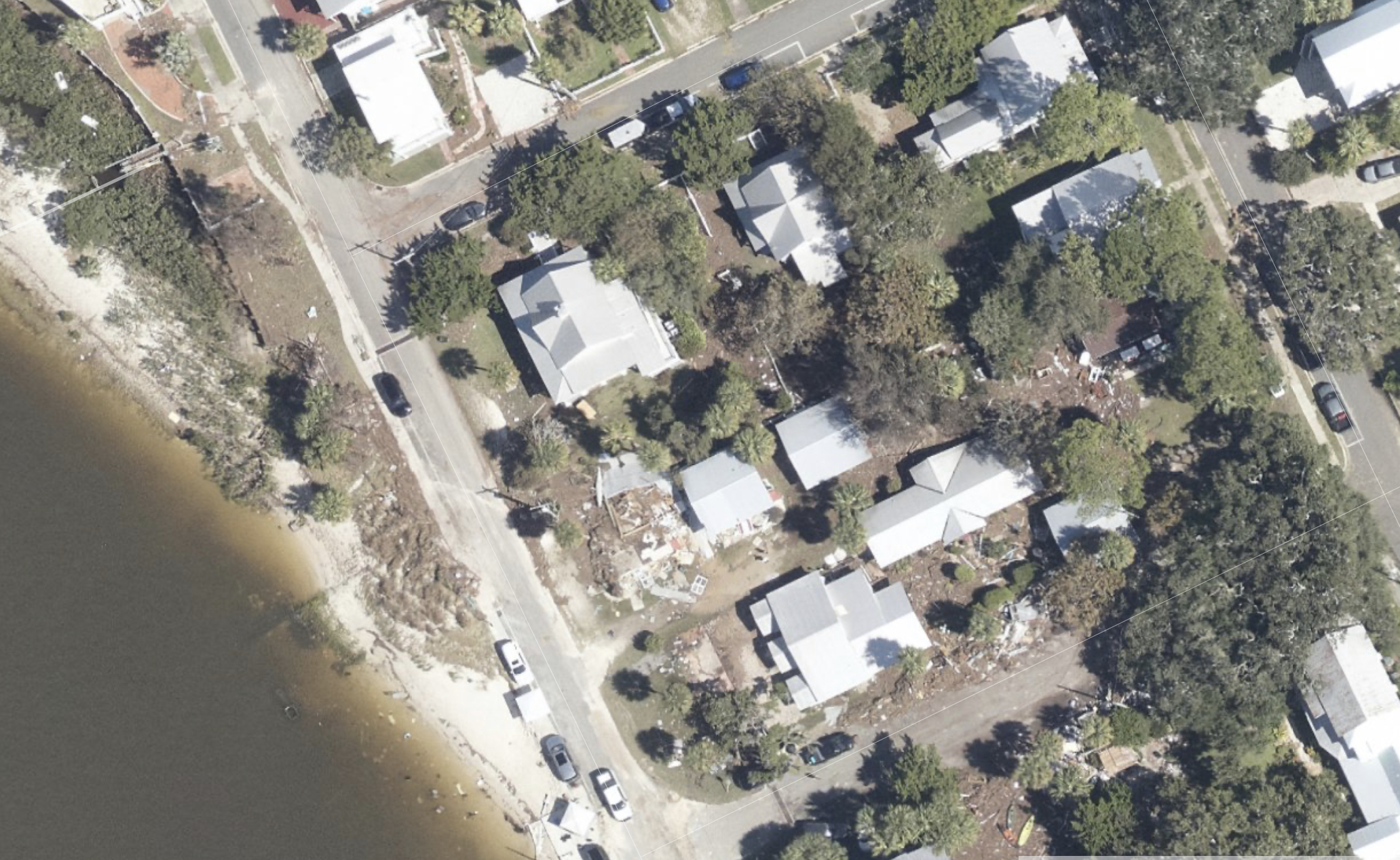
Damage in Cedar Key

==== Florida ====
As Idalia was nearing landfall on the morning of August 30, an extreme wind warning was issued for portions of the Gulf Coast of Florida, including Steinhatchee and Perry.

Idalia made landfall in Keaton Beach, with sustained winds of 115 mph (185 km/h), causing severe damage in the area. Water levels near Cedar Key reached 6.8 ft (2.1 m), and the storm surge water level was at 8.9 feet (2.7 m). Tampa Bay and Clearwater experienced over 3 ft (0.91 m) of storm surge. US 41 bridges in Port Charlotte and Punta Gorda were closed due to flooding. Waves crashed over the northbound side of the Howard Frankland Bridge, partially flooding the bridge. Across Pasco County, an estimated 2,000 homes were damaged as up to 5 ft (1.5 m) of water inundated structures. Roughly 150 people required rescue during the storm. Two men were killed in traffic accidents while driving in hazardous conditions in Pasco and Alachua counties respectively. In Hernando Beach, storm surge prevented firefighters from reaching an unoccupied house which caught fire, forcing neighbors to try to contain the fire with garden hoses to prevent the fire from spreading.

Idalia caused widespread wind damage in Suwannee county as the eyewall passed over. Many barns and carports were destroyed, along with a few other farm buildings. Wind gusts in Dowling Park were estimated to be as high as 100 miles per hour (160 km/h), and wind gusts were estimated at over 110 miles per hour (180 km/h) in a small area around the Suwannee River.

At least 75 people were rescued from flooded areas near St. Petersburg. The Governor's Mansion in Tallahassee was struck by a falling oak tree, but no injuries or serious damage was reported. A gas transmission line in Tallahassee gave out, forcing residents within a quarter-mile of it to evacuate. Waves partially destroyed the balusters of Memorial Park in Jacksonville, which had been repaired following damage caused by Hurricane Irma just under six years earlier. Off of Merritt Island, a man went missing while windsurfing in the Banana River and his body was found on September 2. Because he drowned while the area was under a tropical storm warning, it has been classified as a hurricane-related death.

At least 278,000 customers lost power and more than 200 flights were cancelled across several airlines in Florida.

On September 5, a man in Dixie County was killed while clearing debris with a tractor when he was struck by a falling tree.

==== Georgia ====
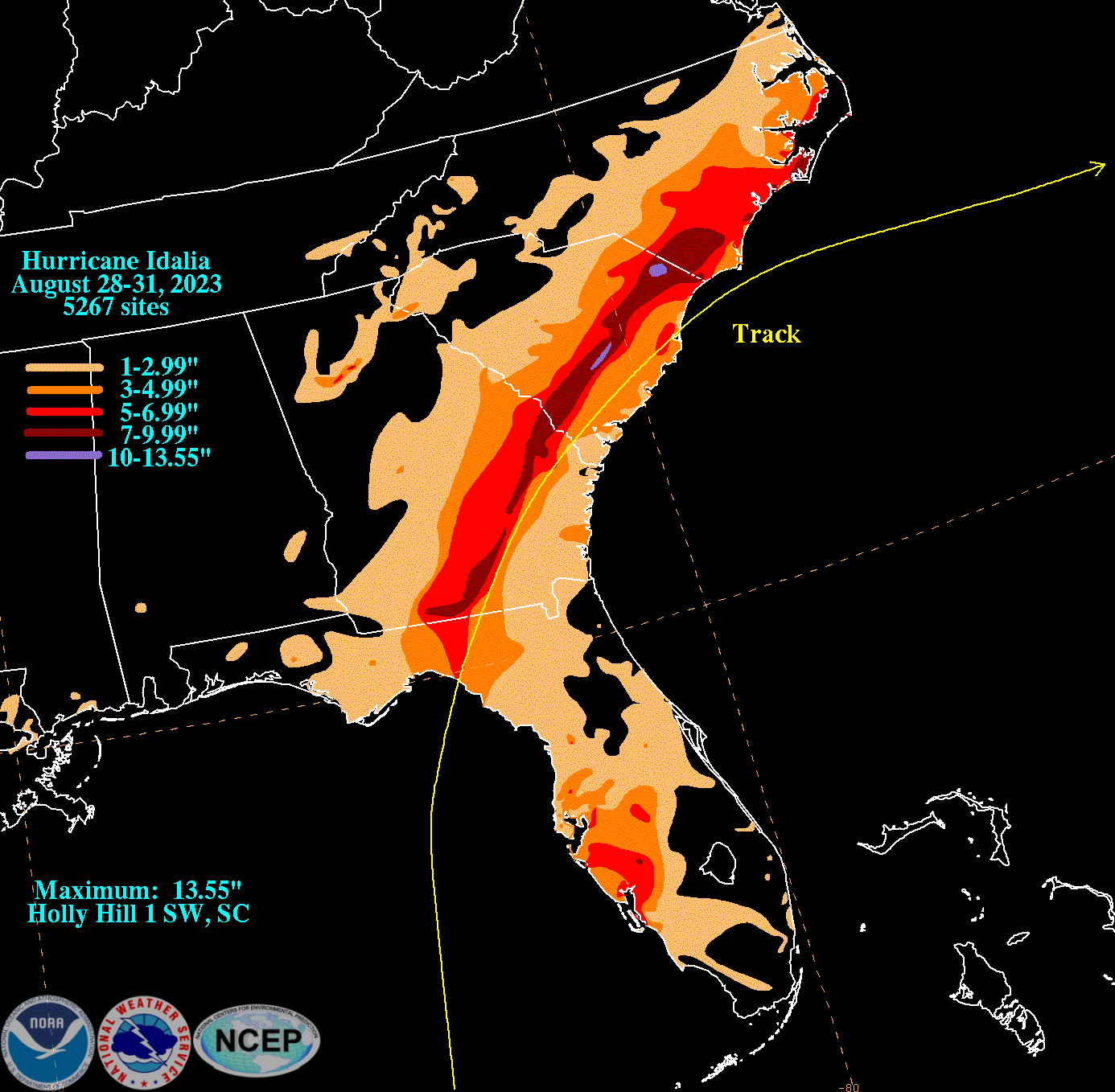
Rainfall map for Idalia with a maximum of 13.55 inches in Holly Hill, South Carolina.

A flash flood emergency was issued for the Valdosta area. Downed power lines closed a portion of I-75 south of Valdosta. One man was killed in Valdosta after a tree fell as the man helped two sheriff's deputies clear debris from a road. Rainfall in the Valdosta area reached 5.5 in (140 mm). In addition, I-75 in the Valdosta area was shut down. Damage in Lowndes County was estimated at $20 million, with 1,127 homes damaged. American Airlines suspended operations at Savannah/Hilton Head International Airport, and Hoboken Elementary School in Hoboken had portions of its roof ripped off. A weak EF0 tornado passed west of Brunswick, damaging a traffic light and downing numerous trees. An EF1 tornado then struck the town minutes later, throwing a tree branch through the windshield of a pickup truck, blowing the top off of a storage shed, knocking down a small billboard, and snapping or uprooting numerous trees. Another short-lived EF1 tornado to the east of Brunswick in St. Simons also snapped and uprooted trees. An additional short-lived EF0 tornado occurred northwest of Fleming as well. Over 190,000 customers in Georgia lost power. In Bulloch County, four county roads were severely damaged by more than 8 in (200 mm) of rain causing flooding throughout the county. Bulloch's Public Works and Transportation Director, Dink Butler, who is responsible for overseeing county roads, estimated the cost of damages to be at $360,080.

==== South Carolina ====
A very brief EF0 tornado in Goose Creek flipped a car on US 52, injuring two people. Four other tornadoes struck the state as well. An EF1 tornado struck a wooded area northeast of Turbeville, while an EF0 tornado moved southeast through Mount Pleasant, causing minor damage and crossed over Wando High School. The Francis Marion National Forest was struck by an EF1 tornado which left trees uprooted and snapped. In North Myrtle Beach, a waterspout came ashore as an EF0 tornado and caused damage to a neighborhood. Storm surge breached The Battery, a historical defensive seawall and promenade in Charleston, causing flooding in the downtown. Further south down the coast in Edisto Beach, a dune was also breached by storm surge, causing flooding within the town.

Beginning on September 3, heavy rains from Idalia in the Midlands began flooding low-lying areas along the Edisto and Combahee rivers in Colleton and Dorchester counties, with water levels peaking at 14.5 feet (4.4 m) at a river gauge at Givhans Ferry State Park. The flooding caused one person to be rescued from a home in Givhans.

==== North Carolina ====
Three tornadoes struck the state. An EF0 tornado damaged a veterinary hospital and two other buildings in St. James. An EF1 tornado struck a wooded area in Old Town, while in Myrtle Grove, a waterspout moved ashore and became an EF1 tornado, damaging two buildings and causing a tree to fall on an SUV, injuring the driver. One person drowned due to rip currents along the coast of Avon on September 4.

==== Elsewhere ====
Rip currents produced by the remnants of Idalia across the Eastern United States resulted in numerous rescues. Beaches were packed with people enjoying the Labor Day Weekend. One person drowned off Rehoboth Beach, Delaware, on September 3. At least a dozen people required rescue along the New Jersey coast. Three people died in the state on September 4: one in Beach Haven, one in Belmar, and the third in Seaside Heights.

Idalia was also associated with an unusual movement of American Flamingos, with a large number of flamingos seen in Florida, and flamingos seen as far north as Ohio and Pennsylvania.

=== Bermuda ===
On September 2, the Department of Marine and Ports Services announced that ferries were suspended until weather conditions improved, BELCO announced that Idalia had caused over 6,000 power outages, and the Department of Public Transportation announced the temporary suspension of bus services. Idalia also caused all flights between L.F. Wade International Airport and North America to be cancelled or delayed on September 2, with some flights also being affected the following day.

== Aftermath ==
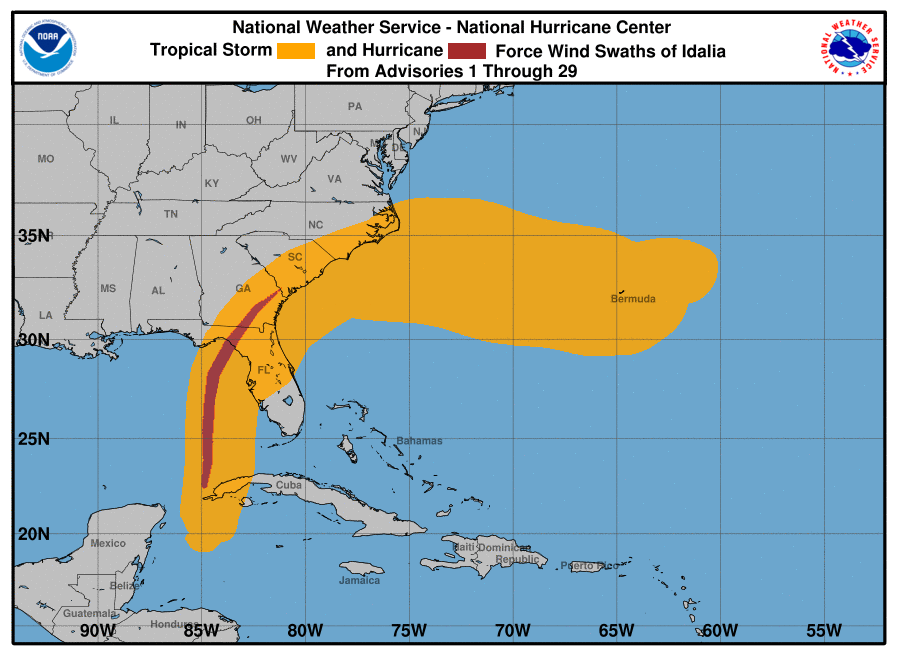
Hurricane Idalia's wind history.

=== United States ===
On August 31, 2023, President Joe Biden said that he had spoken to Florida Governor Ron DeSantis and other governors about Idalia and that he had approved of their requests for disaster and emergency declarations.

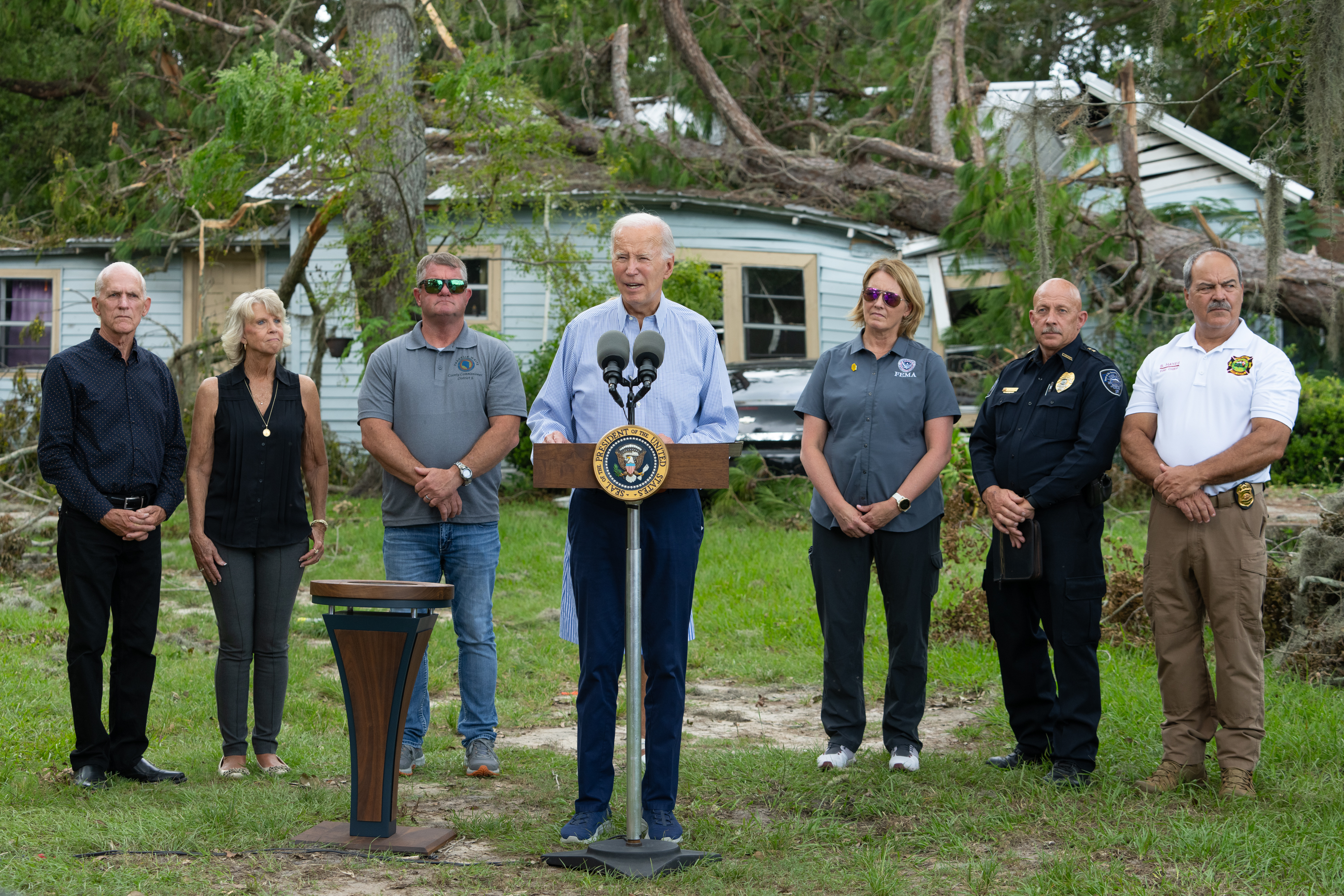
President Joe Biden addressing the impacts of the storm in Live Oak, Florida

==== Florida ====
On August 30, Governor Ron DeSantis visited Perry and gave a press conference update on the state's response to the storm, where he spoke alongside several state and local officials. President Biden announced that he had directed FEMA Administrator Deanne Criswell to fly to Florida and meet with DeSantis and that up to 1,500 federal personnel as well as 900 members of the Coast Guard were being sent to respond to the hurricane's impacts.

On September 2, President Biden, First Lady Jill Biden, and FEMA Administrator Deanne Criswell, landed at Gainesville Regional Airport before embarking on an aerial tour of affected areas within the state. Biden then visited Suwannee Pineview Elementary School in Live Oak where he was briefed on the damage caused by the storm. Biden met with residents of Live Oak as well as Live Oak Mayor Frank Davis and Senator Rick Scott among other officials.

FEMA opened up six temporary Disaster and Recovery Centers across Dixie, Levy, Hamilton, Suwannee, Madison, and Lafayette counties. Fourteen counties; Citrus, Columbia, Dixie, Gilchrist, Hamilton, Hernando, Jefferson, Lafayette, Levy, Madison, Pasco, Pinellas, Suwannee, and Taylor, were made eligible for Individual, Critical Needs, Clean and Sanitize, and Disaster Unemployment Assistance.

The Small Business Administration made available Business Physical Disaster, Economic Injury Disaster, and Home Disaster loans available to Citrus, Columbia, Dixie, Gilchrist, Hamilton, Hernando, Jefferson, Lafayette, Levy, Madison, Pasco, Pinellas, Suwannee, and Taylor counties. Meanwhile, Alachua, Baker, Hillsborough, Leon, Marion, Polk, Sumter, Union, and Wakulla counties were only eligible for Economic Injury Disaster loans.

The hurricane began an apparent American Flamingo population boom within the state, as wildlife experts believe many of the birds that were brought from the Caribbean and Yucatán Peninsula into the United States by Idalia's winds did not leave the state like they did in other parts of the country and instead settled down. While flamingos are native to South Florida, they have not existed in significant numbers since the 19th century, when hunting drove them out of the state, but according to Audubon who conducted a census on the flamingo population in February, finding 101 birds, they have a chance to reassert themselves in Florida.

==== Georgia ====
On September 1, Governor Brian Kemp toured Valdosta with Georgia First Lady Marty Kemp and other state officials to survey damage from Idalia. While in Valdosta, Georgia Emergency Management and Homeland Security Agency Director Chris Stallings announced that the state had requested federal assistance from FEMA for the clean-up efforts within the state.

The SBA declared Cook, Glynn, and Lowndes counties eligible for Physical and Economic Injury Disaster Loans due being approved federal disaster relief funds from FEMA due to President Biden approving a major disaster declaration for the counties, which also made those counties eligible for Individual and Public Assistance from FEMA. Meanwhile, Berrien, Brooks, Camden, Colquitt, Echols, Lanier, McIntosh, Tift, and Wayne counties were made eligible to apply only for Economic Injury Disaster Loans. The United States Department of Agriculture has also approved of financial aid to farmers in Berrien County with crop damage.

== See also ==
- Timeline of the 2023 Atlantic hurricane season
- Tropical cyclones in 2023
- Weather of 2023
- List of Category 4 Atlantic hurricanes
- List of Florida hurricanes (2000–present)
- 1896 Cedar Keys hurricane – a Category 3‑equivalent hurricane that made landfall in the same general region
- 1993 Storm of the Century – an extratropical cyclone that caused similar storm surge impacts to the Florida Big Bend 30 years earlier.
- Hurricane Michael (2018) – a Category 5 hurricane that made landfall in the same general region
- Hurricane Ian (2022) – a Category 5 hurricane that made landfall in South Florida after impacting Cuba, and also affected the Carolinas
- Hurricane Debby (2024) – a Category 1 hurricane that made landfall in a similar area 11 months after Idalia
- Hurricane Helene (2024) – a Category 4 hurricane that made landfall in the Big Bend region of Florida 13 months after Idalia
- Hurricane Isaias (2026) — a Category 3 hurricane that took a similar track made landfall in the Florida Panhandle
