= Carroll Place =

Historic house in South Carolina, United States

- U.S. National Register of Historic Places
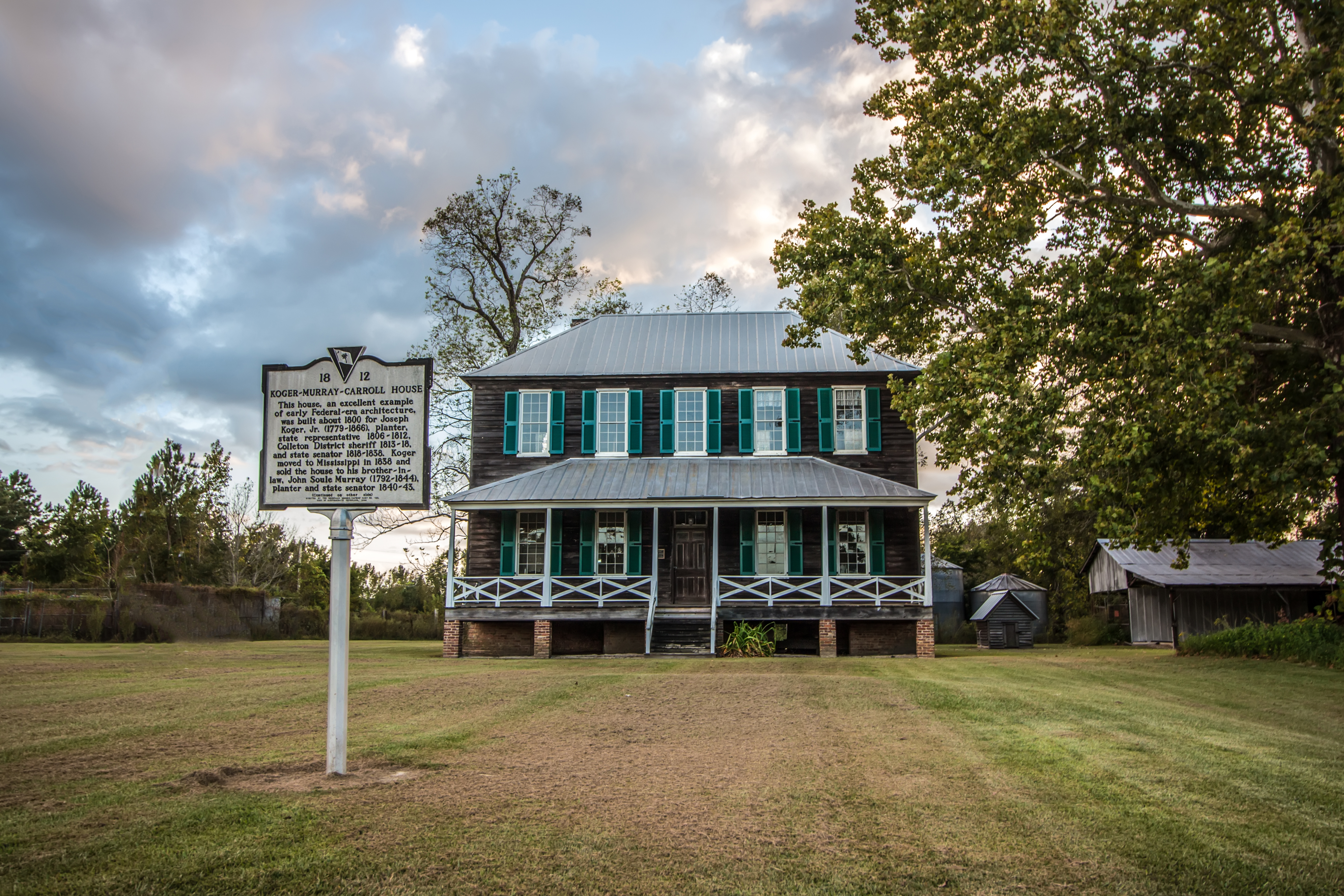

- Location within South Carolina Location within the United States
- Location: Junction of Quaker and Wire Rds., near St. George, South Carolina
- Coordinates: 33°7′39″N 80°38′8″W
- Area: 1 acre (0.40 ha)
- Built: 1820
- Built by: Koger, Joseph
- Architectural style: Georgian
- NRHP reference No.: 74001849
- Added to NRHP: July 25, 1974

Carroll Place, also known as Old Carroll Place, is a historic plantation house located near St. George, Dorchester County, South Carolina.

Research completed c. 2012 at the South Carolina Archives in Columbia S.C. shows the house was built c. 1780, and is a plain two-story, Georgian I-house dwelling. It is sheathed in clapboard single house and rests upon low brick pillars. It has a hip roofed verandah supported by six wooden posts. Its builder was likely Thomas Ferguson or David Campbell.

In 2008, the house was donated to the Dorchester County Historical Society by current owners Fitzhugh Lee Sweatman Jr. and his wife, Martha Westbury-Sweatman. The Dorchester County Historical Society undertook an extensive restoration of the colonial era plantation house and when completed, re-designated the house as the Koger-Murray-Carroll House for three of its previous owners who served in the South Carolina General Assembly: Joseph Koger (married the daughter of David Campbell and inherited the house on her death), Soule Murray (purchased the house and land from Joseph Koger), and James Parsons Carroll (purchased the property c. 1850). James Parsons Carroll also served in the South Carolina Court of Equity as a Chancellor and was a signer of the South Carolina Ordinance of Secession. In 1974, the house was added to the National Register of Historic Places as the "Old Carroll Place" for which it had become known. The last owner/occupants of the house were the late Fitzhugh Lee Sweatman Sr. and his wife Eulalie Knight-Sweatman. Around 1970, Mr. and Mrs. Sweatman Sr. built a smaller one-story house off to the side of the plantation house. Mr. Sweatman Sr. died on the property in 1975.

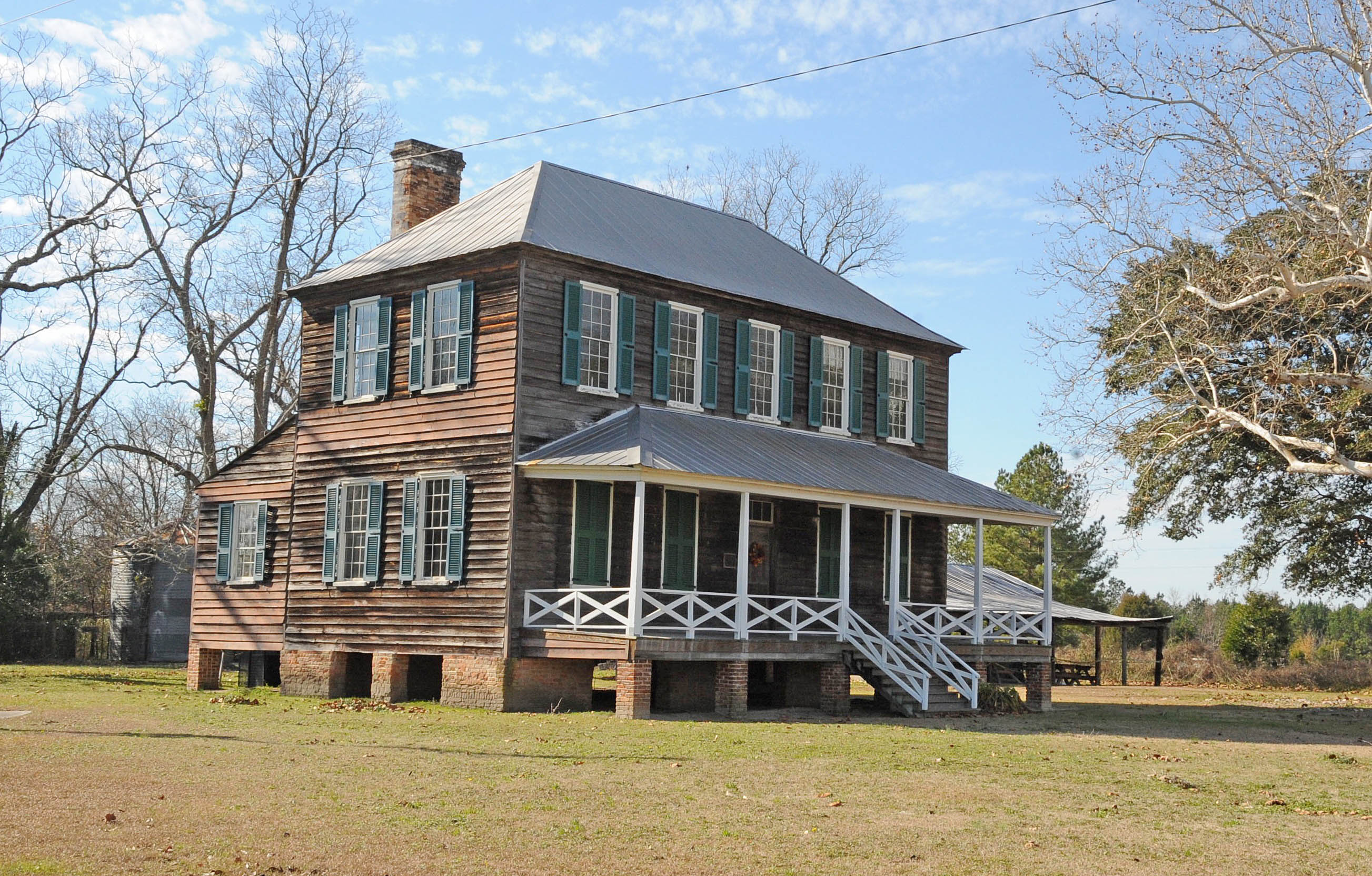
House in 2024
