= Appleby's Methodist Church =

Historic church in South Carolina, US

- U.S. National Register of Historic Places
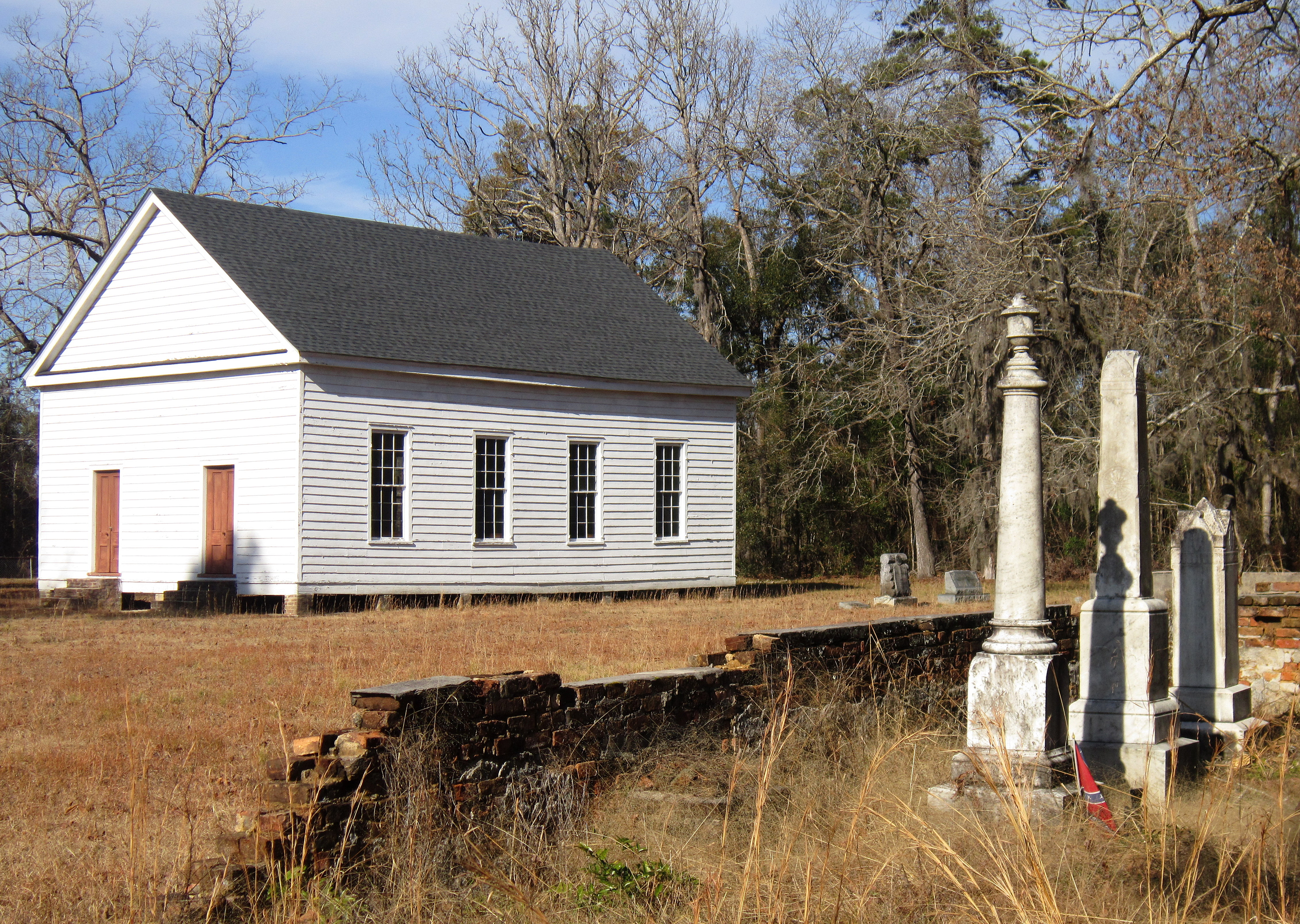
- Appelby's Methodist Church and Gravestones

- Location within South Carolina Location within the United States
- Location: Southwest of St. George at the junction of State Highways 19 and 71, near St. George, South Carolina
- Coordinates: 33°8′14″N 80°39′3″W
- Area: 5 acres (2.0 ha)
- Built: c. 1845
- Architectural style: Greek Revival
- NRHP reference No.: 78002505
- Added to NRHP: February 14, 1978

Appleby's Methodist Church is a historic Methodist church located near St. George, Dorchester County, South Carolina. It was probably built about 1840–1850, and is a one-story, wooden meeting house in the Greek Revival style. The building is clapboard and the medium gable roof is covered with asphalt shingles. Also on the property is a contributing late 19th-century cemetery.

It was built in 1840 and added to the National Register in 1978.

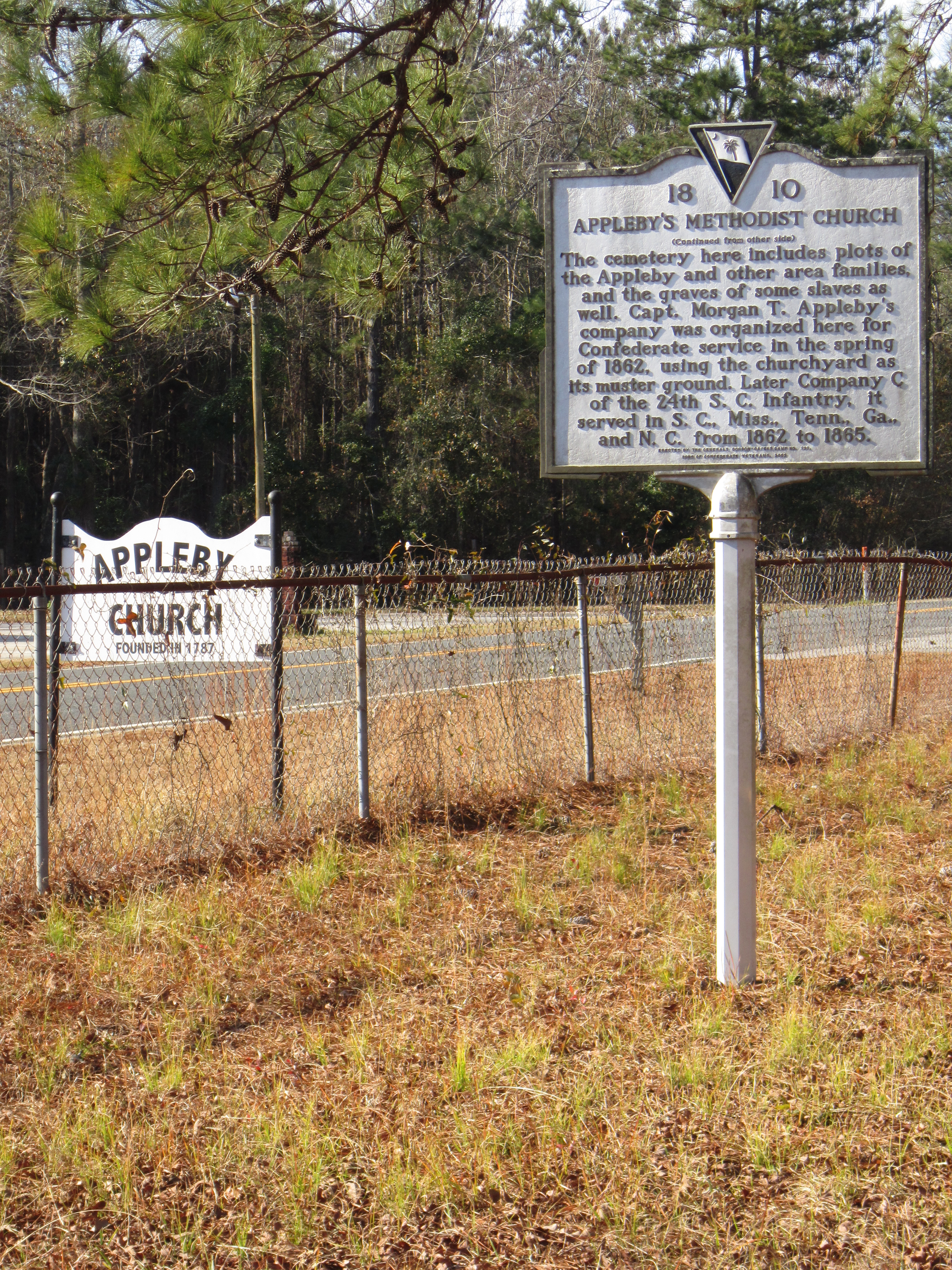
National Register Historic Sign
