= Colonial Dorchester State Historic Site =

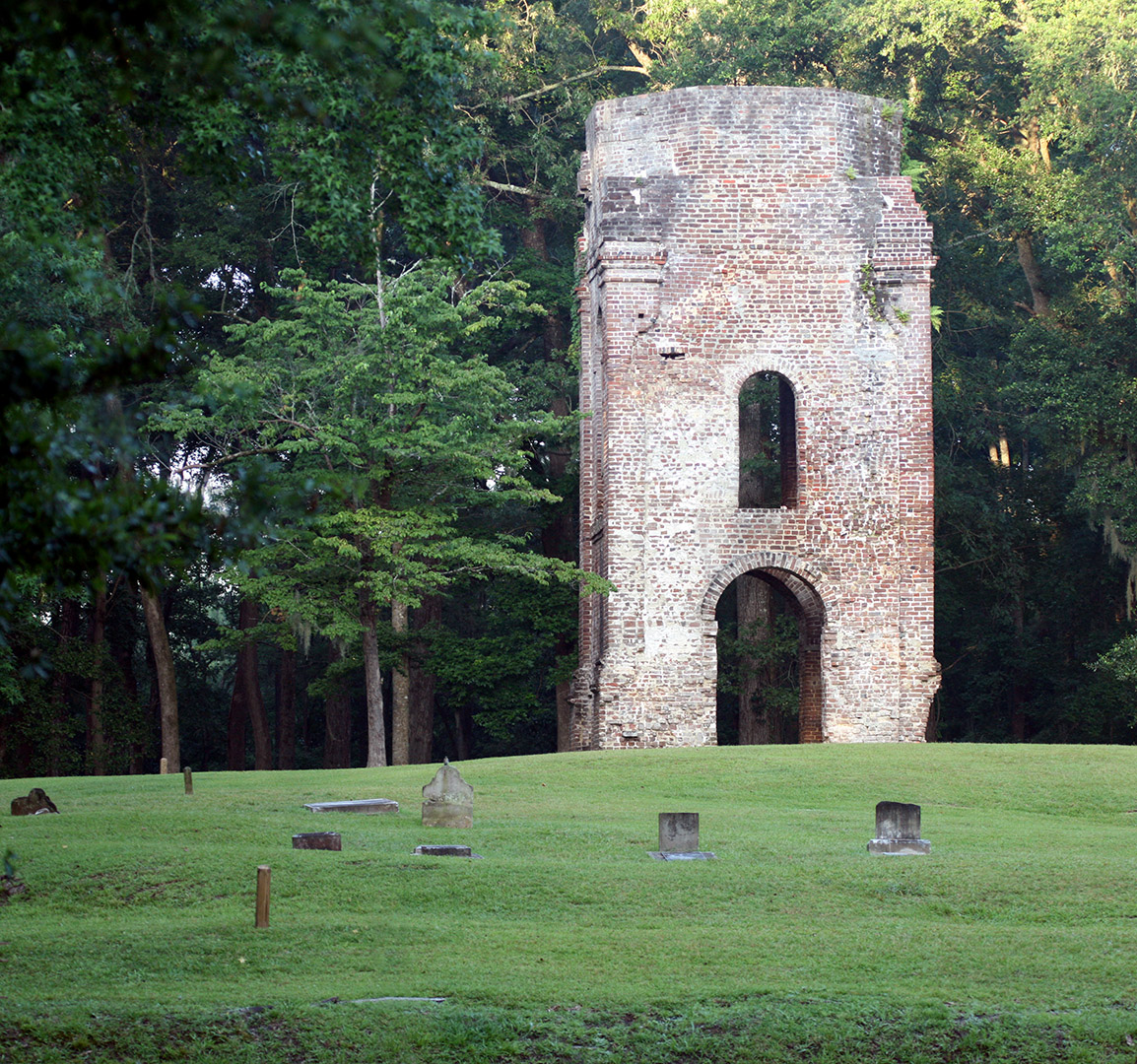
- Cemetery and ruins of the St. George Bell Tower
- Interactive map of Colonial Dorchester State Historic Site
- Nearest city: Summerville, SC
- Coordinates: 32°56′58″N 80°10′19″W
- Area: 325 acres (1 km^{2})
- Open: 1960

Colonial Dorchester State Historic Site sits along the Ashley River, near the town of Summerville in Dorchester County, South Carolina. In 1969, the site was donated to the South Carolina State Park Service and was added to the National Register of Historic Places on December 2, 1969. The park is 325 acres large. It is the site of one of the most well-preserved oyster-shell tabby forts in the country, St. George's Bell Tower, log shipping wharves, burial sites and cemeteries, as well as on-going archaeological digs that are still unearthing the settlement's history.

== History ==
The historic site is situated on the Ashley River where the town of Dorchester once stood. The site of the town of Dorchester is on a neck of land between the Ashley River and Dorchester Creek, originally known as Boshoe Creek.

=== Founding ===
In 1675, John and Mary Smith came to Carolina from England. On November 20, 1676 the Earl of Shaftsbury granted 1,800 acres of land to John Smith, which included the future Dorchester site. John Smith's land grant was situated on Boshoe Creek, in Boshoe Swamp; subsequently, he became known as "John Smith of Boo-shoo." In December 1682, John Smith died and his widow married Arthur Middleton, and when he died in 1684, she married Ralph Izard. Because John Smith had no children, his land grant lapsed after he died and ownership of the land went to the state.

In January 1696, small group of settlers from the township of Dorchester, Massachusetts acquired 4,050 acres, including the 1,800 acres along the Boshoe Creek and Ashley River. After receiving permission from the Dorchester church of Massachusetts, Reverend Joseph Lord and his Congregationalist parishioners, considering themselves missionaries and ready to "settle the gospel, " ventured to Carolina to settle this land. On Sunday, January 26, 1696, the Reverend Lord preached his first sermon at the place selected for the church building. The new settlers quickly began planning and building the town's first church, which was eventually known as St. George's Anglican Church, or the Parish Church of St. George. After the church was established, the town of Dorchester quickly developed and more settlers came from Massachusetts.

=== A Thriving Economy ===
The site's advantageous location helped the town thrive - nearby roads led to Charleston and to the interior of the colony and the Ashley River provided a convenient highway for the shipment of goods and produce. Trade with Native Americans, the development of rice and indigo as cash crops and a growing population, helped secure Dorchester's economic peak in the mid 1700s. During this time, wealthy planters, merchants and plantation owners continued to reap the benefits of this trading town, which remained relatively small through most of its hundred-year existence, and the town continued to be a bustling commercial center for trade. A fair was established in 1723, and a Free School in 1734; by 1781 Dorchester had about 40 houses.

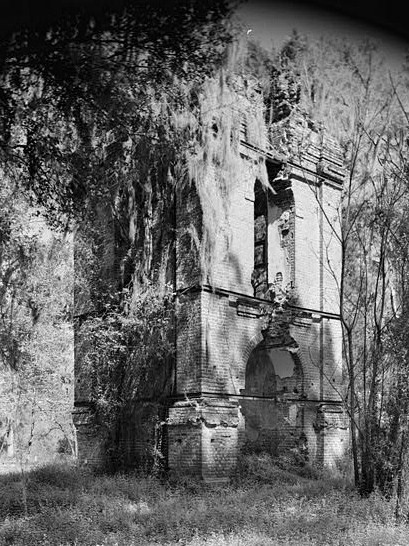
St. George's Anglican Church Bell Tower

=== The Church & Bell Tower ===
Built in the center of Dorchester, St. George's Anglican Church was originally erected and completed in 1719 and the Bell Tower, which stands today, was added in 1751. As Dorchester was being turned into an armed camp for American forces at the beginning of the Revolution, a plan was submitted for fortifying St. George's Church. Exactly how the church was to be fortified remains a mystery, for the plan has never been found. When British troops occupied Dorchester later in the war they used the large church and burned it before they were chased out of the village in December 1781. The church was eventually repaired but, like the town around it, was soon abandoned. Scavengers removed bricks from the decayed sanctuary just as they took away bricks from other buildings in town. An 1858 magazine article on Dorchester noted, "Rumor says, they were afraid to touch the tower, because there was a chance of its falling on them, and therefore it remains." The Earthquake of 1886 that devastated Charleston, split the tower along its height and for many years after, it was held together with iron straps until it was repaired in the early 1960s.

=== The Fort & Powder Magazine ===
Dorchester's location made it a strategic military site. Fear of a possible French invasion prompted the construction of a powder magazine and fort from 1757 to 1760. Originally designed to be constructed using brick, the fort and powder magazine were eventually made of tabby, a concrete material made of lime, sand and oyster shells. While local materials were used in the construction of the fort, in design it was a simplified version of classic European fortification. The walls formed a rectangle around the magazine, with sections called half-bastions projecting from each corner. From these strong points, soldiers could direct deadly fire down the length of adjoining walls. The French invasion never came, though, and the town apparently saw little activity until the American Revolution in 1775.

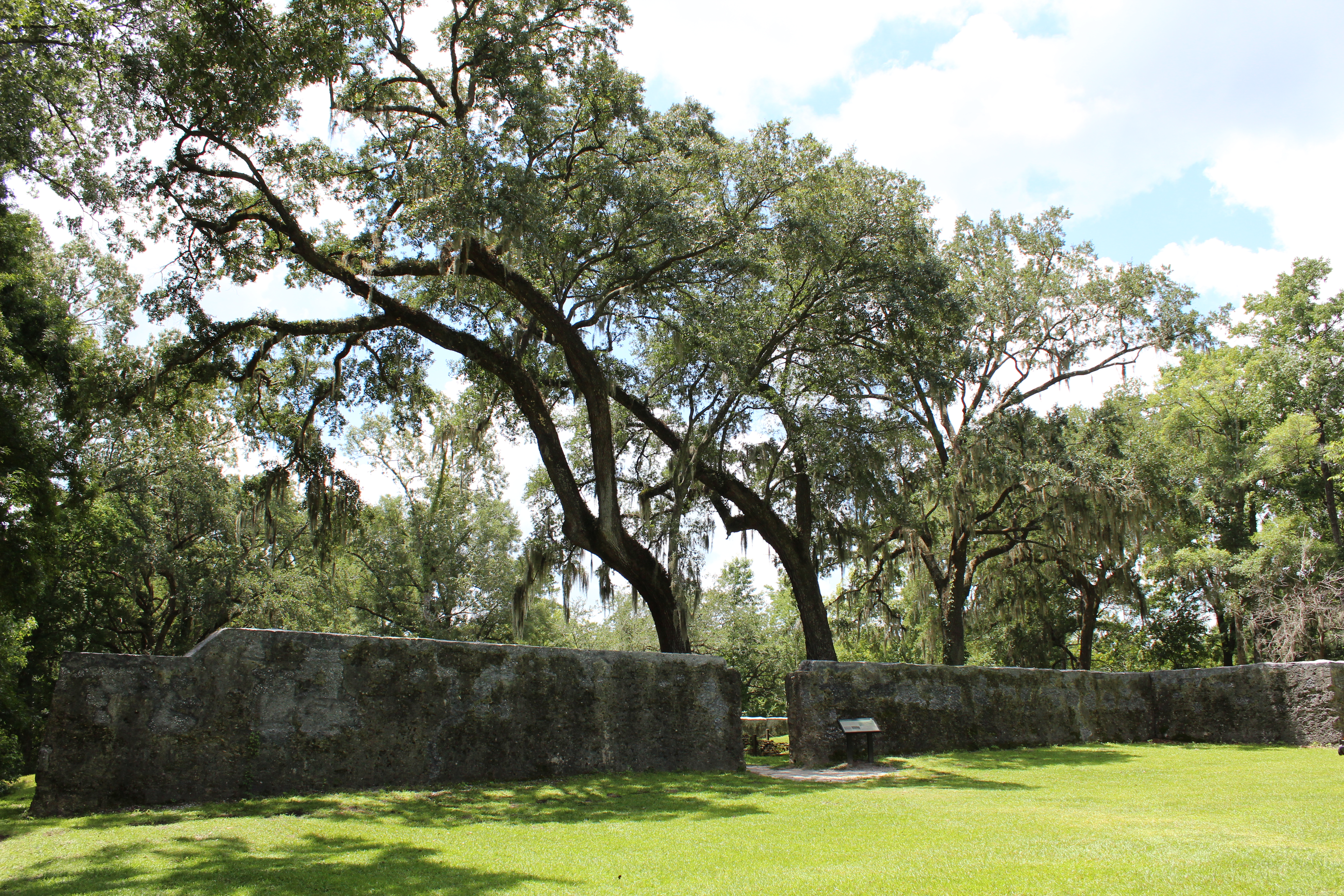
Located in Colonial Dorchester State Historical site Ft. Dorchester is the best-preserved tabby fortification in the country.

In preparation of the impending war, the little town of Dorchester was transformed into a military depot and American troops assembled in town. In 1775 the magazine was fortified and the fort was commanded by Capt. Francis Marion. After Charleston fell to the British in May 1780, Dorchester became an outpost for British and Loyalist troops. In December 1781, American forces, led by Colonel Wade Hampton and General Nathanael Greene, advanced on the town and the British were driven out of Dorchester.

After the war, the fort housed a tile yard, with the magazine converted into a kiln for firing clay roofing tiles. But like the rest of town, the fort was soon abandoned. Its history was forgotten. Some people assumed it had been built by the Spanish, and many asserted that it had been built to provide protection from Indians. Locals eventually gave it the name "Fort Dorchester," even though it never had an official name while it was in use.

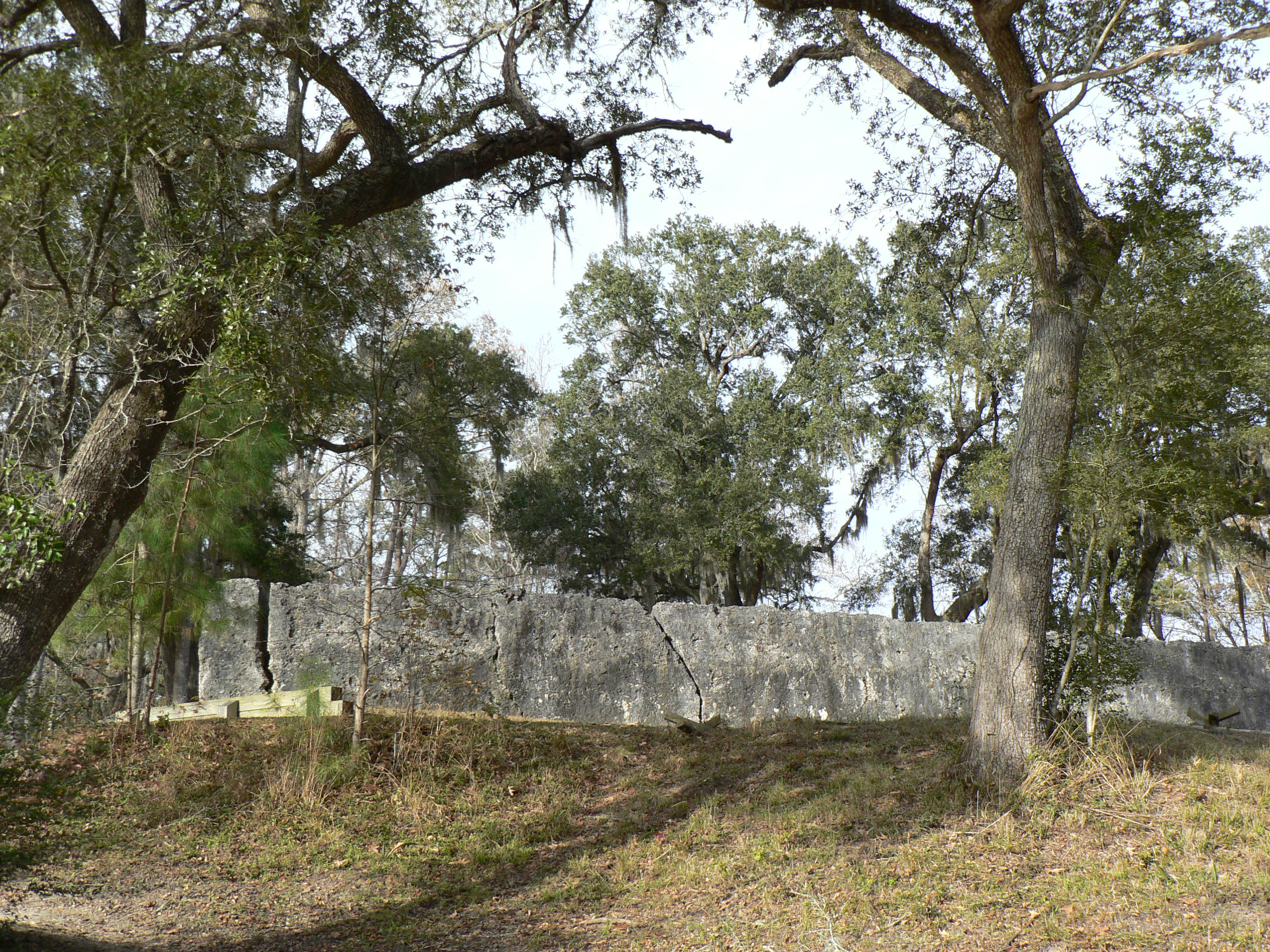
The walls of Fort Dorchester, from the Ashley River

=== Downfall ===
Seemingly, the town never recovered after the war, though the reasons given by historians for Dorchester's decline are many and varied. They range from the devastation wrought by British and Loyalist soldiers to the malaria that plagued the swampy area. In 1788, a traveler wrote,

I passed Dorchester, where there are the remains of what appears to have once been a considerable town: there are the ruins of an elegant church, and the vestiges of several well-built houses.

As Dorchester was abandoned, it was succeeded by a new town, Summerville, that developed close by on higher, better-drained land. Bricks from buildings in the older town were even removed for use in structures in the new town.

== Activities & Amenities ==
- Park Walking Tour
- Cemetery Self-Guided Tour at St. George's Anglican Church
- Geocaching
- Interpretive kiosk and trails
- Fort Dorchester Colonial Demonstrations, Living History programs and "Garrison Weekends."
- Archaeological programs and digs - on-going and offered throughout the year.
- Picnic area and tables - grills are prohibited.
- Fishing - freshwater fishing license required.
- Wildlife and bird watching - American alligators, white-tailed deer, fox, raccoon, bald eagles and various hawks can be viewed at the park.

== Hours & Admission ==
- Admission: $3 Adults; $1.25 SC Seniors; Free for children aged 15 and younger.
- Hours of Operation: Daily 9:00 am – 6:00 pm during Daylight Saving Time, and daily 9:00 am – 5:00 pm the remainder of the year.
- Dates & Holidays Closed: Christmas Day
- Office Hours: Daily 11:00 am – 12:00 pm
