= Grover, South Carolina =

- Census-designated place
- Location within South Carolina Location within the United States
- Coordinates: 33°06′19″N 80°35′41″W
- Country: United States
- State: South Carolina
- County: Dorchester

Area
  - Total: 2.59 sq mi (6.70 km^{2})
  - Land: 2.59 sq mi (6.70 km^{2})
  - Water: 0 sq mi (0.00 km^{2})
- Elevation: 79 ft (24 m)

Population (2020)
  - Total: 297
  - Density: 114.8/sq mi (44.32/km^{2})
- Time zone: UTC-5 (Eastern (EST))
  - Summer (DST): UTC-4 (EDT)
- ZIP code: 29477
- Area codes: 843, 854
- GNIS feature ID: 2812953

Grover is an unincorporated community and census-designated place (CDP) in Dorchester County, South Carolina, United States. It was first listed as a CDP in the 2020 census with a population of 297.

== History ==
Grover was named for President Grover Cleveland.

== Demographics ==
Historical population
Census	Pop.	Note	%±
2020	297		—
U.S. Decennial Census; 2020

Grover first appeared as a census designated place in the 2020 U.S. census.

=== 2020 census ===
Grover CDP, South Carolina – Demographic Profile (NH = Non-Hispanic)
Race / Ethnicity	Pop 2020	% 2020
White alone (NH)	211	71.04%
Black or African American alone (NH)	62	20.88%
Native American or Alaska Native alone (NH)	3	1.01%
Asian alone (NH)	2	0.67%
Pacific Islander alone (NH)	0	0.00%
Some Other Race alone (NH)	0	0.00%
Mixed Race/Multi-Racial (NH)	6	2.02%
Hispanic or Latino (any race)	13	4.38%
Total	297	100.00%

Note: the US Census treats Hispanic/Latino as an ethnic category. This table excludes Latinos from the racial categories and assigns them to a separate category. Hispanics/Latinos can be of any race.
