= Givhans Ferry State Park =

State park in South Carolina, United States

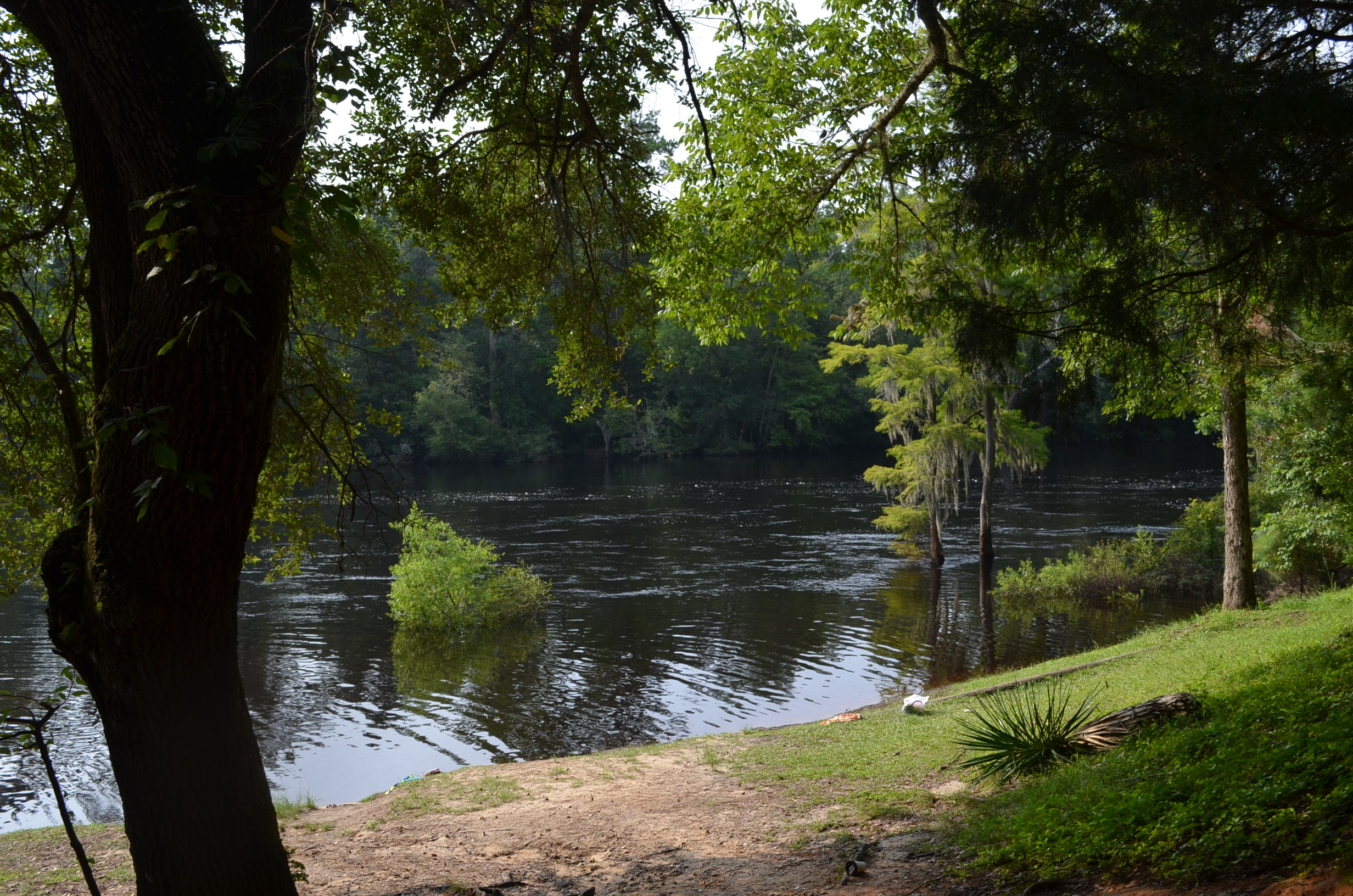
- Edisto River in Givhans Ferry State Park
- Interactive map of Givhans Ferry State Park
- Nearest city: Ridgeville, SC
- Coordinates: 33°01′56″N 80°22′38″W
- Area: 988 acres (4 km^{2})
- Created: 1934
- Camp sites: tent and RV sites, primitive group camping area, cabins
- Hiking trails: 1.5 mile long River Bluff Nature Trail

Givhans Ferry State Park is a state park located near the town of Ridgeville in Dorchester County, South Carolina.

== History ==
The property used to create Givhans Ferry State Park was donated by the city of Charleston in 1934 and was one of the original built by the Civilian Conservation Corps in South Carolina. Its namesake, Phillip Givhan, was a ferry master on the Edisto River and operated Givhan's Ferry, which allowed access between Augusta and Charleston.

A series of copper marl limestone bluffs along the Edisto River in the park, formed by prehistoric ocean deposits, are protected as a Heritage Trust Site.

== Activities and amenities ==
Activities available at the park include picnicking, fishing, bird watching, geocaching and camping. A boat drop off area allows small boats access to the Edisto River. The multi-purpose River Bluff Nature Trail is available for hiking and biking.

Amenities include a playground, picnic shelters, volleyball courts and a park store. Visitors can rent fishing rods and reels from the park office.

Historic, fully furnished cabins built by the CCC are available for lodging. The Riverfront Hall is available for rental, with the ability to accommodate up to 100 people.
