= St. George, South Carolina =

- Town
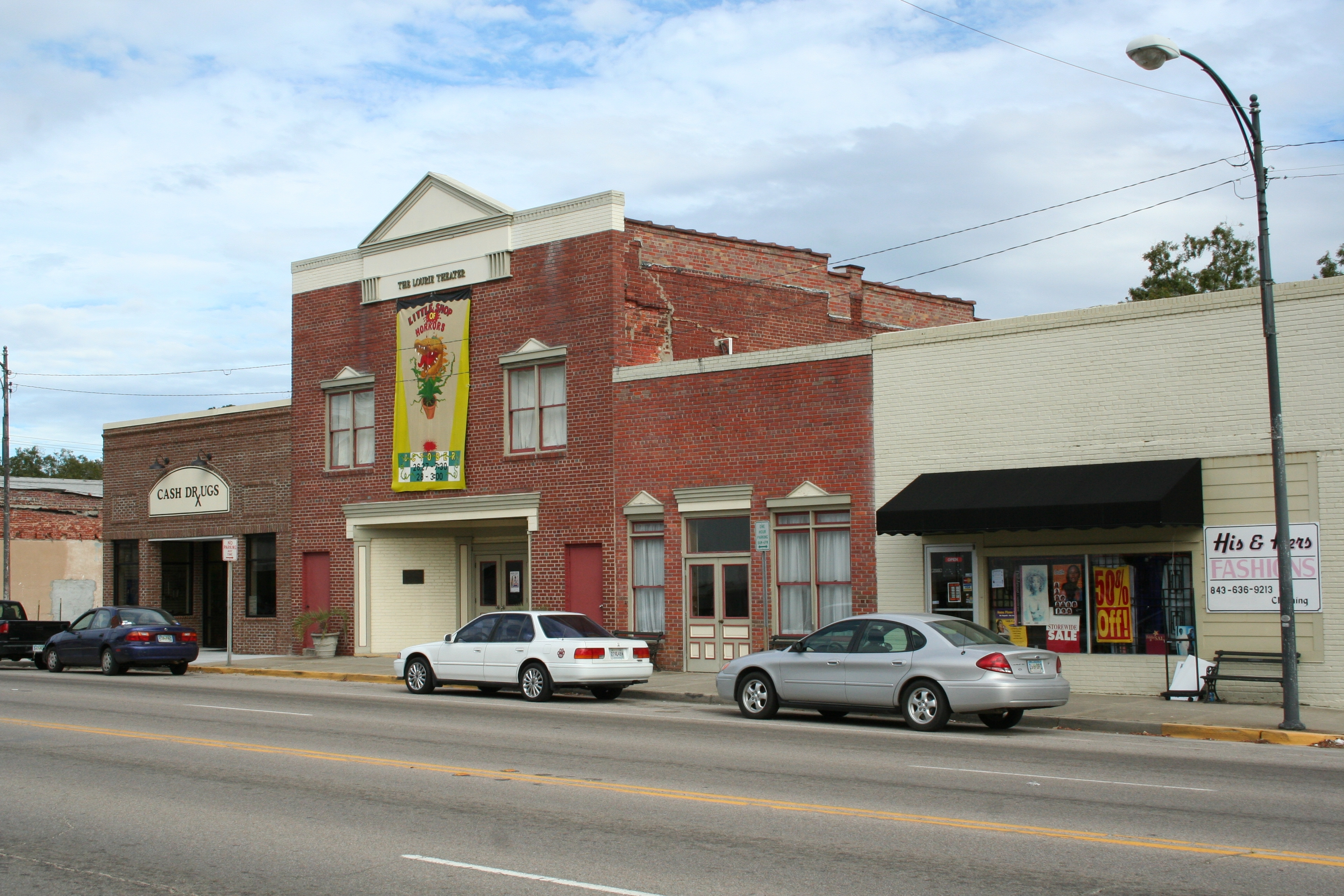
- Restored Lourie Theater in downtown St. George

- Seal
- Motto: "The Town of Friendly People"
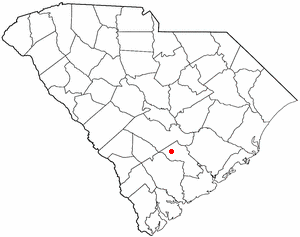
- Location of St. George, South Carolina
- Coordinates: 33°11′10″N 80°34′46″W
- Country: United States
- State: South Carolina
- County: Dorchester

Area
  - Total: 2.85 sq mi (7.37 km^{2})
  - Land: 2.85 sq mi (7.37 km^{2})
  - Water: 0 sq mi (0.00 km^{2})
- Elevation: 95 ft (29 m)

Population (2020)
  - Total: 1,843
  - Density: 647.6/sq mi (250.05/km^{2})
- Time zone: UTC−5 (Eastern (EST))
  - Summer (DST): UTC−4 (EDT)
- ZIP Code: 29477
- FIPS code: 45-62530
- GNIS feature ID: 2407268
- Website: saintgeorgesc.org

St. George is a town in Dorchester County, South Carolina, United States. As of the 2020 census, St. George had a population of 1,843. It has been the county seat of Dorchester County since the county was formed from Colleton County in 1897.

Saint George is included within the Charleston-North Charleston, SC Metropolitan Statistical Area, as defined by the U.S. Office of Management and Budget, and used by the U. S. Census Bureau for statistical purposes only.

== History ==
The Town of St. George was incorporated by an act of the South Carolina Legislature on January 28, 1875. The town grew on both sides of South Carolina Canal and Railroad Company, one of the first railroads built in the United States and the first to offer scheduled passenger trains pulled by steam locomotives. In the 1970s, Appleby's Methodist Church, Carroll Place, and Indian Fields Methodist Campground were listed on the National Register of Historic Places.

== Geography ==
Saint George is located near the crossing of Interstate 26 and Interstate 95.

The town has a total area of 2.7 square miles (7.0 km^{2}), all of it land, according to the United States Census Bureau.

== Demographics ==
Historical population
Census	Pop.	Note	%±
1880	279		—
1890	629		125.4%
1900	576		−8.4%
1910	957		66.1%
1920	1,386		44.8%
1930	1,639		18.3%
1940	1,906		16.3%
1950	1,938		1.7%
1960	1,833		−5.4%
1970	1,806		−1.5%
1980	2,134		18.2%
1990	2,077		−2.7%
2000	2,092		0.7%
2010	2,084		−0.4%
2020	1,843		−11.6%
U.S. Decennial Census

=== 2020 census ===
St. George racial composition
Race	Num.	Perc.
White (non-Hispanic)	938	50.9%
Black or African American (non-Hispanic)	755	40.97%
Native American	8	0.43%
Asian	20	1.09%
Pacific Islander	3	0.16%
Other/Mixed	87	4.72%
Hispanic or Latino	32	1.74%

As of the 2020 United States census, there were 1,843 people, 744 households, and 453 families residing in the town.

=== 2000 census ===
As of the census of 2000, there were 2,092 people and 804 households residing in the town. The population density was 779.7 inhabitants per square mile (301.0/km^{2}). There were 928 housing units at an average density of 345.9 per square mile (133.6/km^{2}). The racial makeup of the town was 51.19% White, 47.22% African American, 0.19% Native American, 0.72% Asian, 0.33% from other races, and 0.33% from two or more races. Hispanic or Latino of any race were 0.91% of the population.

There were 804 households, out of which 30.2% had children under the age of 18 living with them, 42.4% were married couples living together, 19.5% had a female householder with no husband present, and 34.6% were non-families. 32.7% of all households were made up of individuals, and 15.2% had someone living alone who was 65 years of age or older. The average household size was 2.36 and the average family size was 3.00.

In the town, the population was spread out, with 23.9% under the age of 18, 7.6% from 18 to 24, 26.6% from 25 to 44, 22.7% from 45 to 64, and 19.2% who were 65 years of age or older. The median age was 39 years. For every 100 females, there were 91.8 males. For every 100 women age 18 and over, there were 87.4 men.

The median income for a household in the town was $24,651, and the median income for a family was $40,000. Men had a median income of $27,639 versus $19,957 for women. The per capita income for the town was $13,389. About 14.2% of families and 18.7% of the population were below the poverty line, including 22.2% of those under age 18 and 25.2% of those age 65 or over.

== Education ==
St. George has a public library, a branch of the Dorchester County Library.

== Arts and culture ==
In the mid-1980s, town leaders wanted to create a yearly festival for the city. After reviewing possible ideas, local grocery store owner John Walters discovered from contacts at Quaker Oats that the upper part of Dorchester County (where Saint George is located) consumes more grits per capita than any other place in the world. In 1986, the first annual World Grits Festival was held. During the festival, which takes place in mid-April, close to 10,000 people flock to the tiny town for food, music, and games. Until 2019, the festival featured a contest in which people rolled in a vat of grits, vying to have the largest quantity of grits (by weight) stick to them. The festival is held annually; it was not held in 2020 or 2021 because of the COVID-19 pandemic but returned in 2022.
