= Ridgeville, South Carolina =

- Town
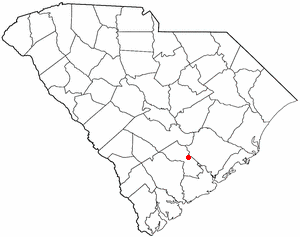
- Location of Ridgeville, South Carolina
- Coordinates: 33°05′24″N 80°18′26″W
- Country: United States
- State: South Carolina
- County: Dorchester

Area
  - Total: 1.80 sq mi (4.65 km^{2})
  - Land: 1.80 sq mi (4.65 km^{2})
  - Water: 0 sq mi (0.00 km^{2})
- Elevation: 56 ft (17 m)

Population (2020)
  - Total: 1,672
  - Density: 931/sq mi (359.4/km^{2})
- Time zone: UTC-5 (Eastern (EST))
  - Summer (DST): UTC-4 (EDT)
- ZIP code: 29472
- Area codes: 843, 854
- FIPS code: 45-60370
- GNIS feature ID: 2407217
- Website: ridgevillegov.com

Ridgeville is a town in Dorchester County, South Carolina, United States. The population was 1,672 at the 2020 census, down from 1,979 at the 2010 census and below the level of 2000. Ridgeville is part of the Charleston-North Charleston-Summerville metropolitan area.

== History ==
The Cypress Methodist Camp Ground was added to the National Register of Historic Places in 1978.

== Geography ==
Ridgeville is located near the center of Dorchester County. South Carolina Highway 27 passes through the town, leading north 1.7 miles (2.7 km) to U.S. Route 78 and 3.2 miles (5.1 km) to Exit 187 on Interstate 26.

According to the United States Census Bureau, the town has a total area of 1.8 square miles (4.7 km^{2}), all land.

== Demographics ==
Historical population
Census	Pop.	Note	%±
1880	250		—
1890	212		−15.2%
1900	250		17.9%
1910	300		20.0%
1920	385		28.3%
1930	418		8.6%
1940	593		41.9%
1950	507		−14.5%
1960	611		20.5%
1970	563		−7.9%
1980	603		7.1%
1990	1,625		169.5%
2000	1,690		4.0%
2010	1,979		17.1%
2020	1,672		−15.5%
U.S. Decennial Census

=== 2020 census ===
Ridgeville town, South Carolina – Racial and ethnic composition Note: the US Census treats Hispanic/Latino as an ethnic category. This table excludes Latinos from the racial categories and assigns them to a separate category. Hispanics/Latinos may be of any race.
Race / Ethnicity (NH = Non-Hispanic)	Pop 2000	Pop 2010	Pop 2020	% 2000	% 2010	% 2020
White alone (NH)	674	648	572	39.88%	32.74%	34.21%
Black or African American alone (NH)	991	1,262	1,000	58.64%	63.77%	59.81%
Native American or Alaska Native alone (NH)	10	12	6	0.59%	0.61%	0.36%
Asian alone (NH)	0	1	5	0.00%	0.05%	0.30%
Pacific Islander alone (NH)	0	0	0	0.00%	0.00%	0.00%
Some Other Race alone (NH)	0	1	1	0.00%	0.05%	0.06%
Mixed race or Multiracial (NH)	7	6	24	0.41%	0.30%	1.44%
Hispanic or Latino (any race)	8	49	64	0.47%	2.48%	3.83%
Total	1,690	1,979	1,672	100.00%	100.00%	100.00%

=== 2000 census ===
As of the census of 2000, there were 1,690 people, 214 households, and 156 families residing in the town. The population density was 930.4 inhabitants per square mile (359.2/km^{2}). There were 232 housing units at an average density of 127.7 per square mile (49.3/km^{2}). The racial makeup of the town was 39.94% White, 58.70% African American, 0.59% Native American, 0.30% from other races, and 0.47% from two or more races. Hispanic or Latino of any race were 0.47% of the population.

There were 214 households, out of which 30.8% had children under the age of 18 living with them, 50.9% were married couples living together, 19.2% had a female householder with no husband present, and 27.1% were non-families. 25.7% of all households were made up of individuals, and 14.5% had someone living alone who was 65 years of age or older. The average household size was 2.63 and the average family size was 3.19.

In the town, the population was spread out, with 8.4% under the age of 18, 11.5% from 18 to 24, 53.2% from 25 to 44, 20.7% from 45 to 64, and 6.3% who were 65 years of age or older. The median age was 36 years. For every 100 females, there were 434.8 males. For every 100 females age 18 and over, there were 542.3 males.

The median income for a household in the town was $32,639, and the median income for a family was $42,188. Males had a median income of $22,500 versus $22,404 for females. The per capita income for the town was $9,186. About 13.6% of families and 18.9% of the population were below the poverty line, including 27.8% of those under age 18 and 21.1% of those age 65 or over.

== Government and infrastructure ==
The South Carolina Department of Corrections operates the Lieber Correctional Institution in Ridgeville.
