= Dorchester County, South Carolina =

County in South Carolina, United States

- County
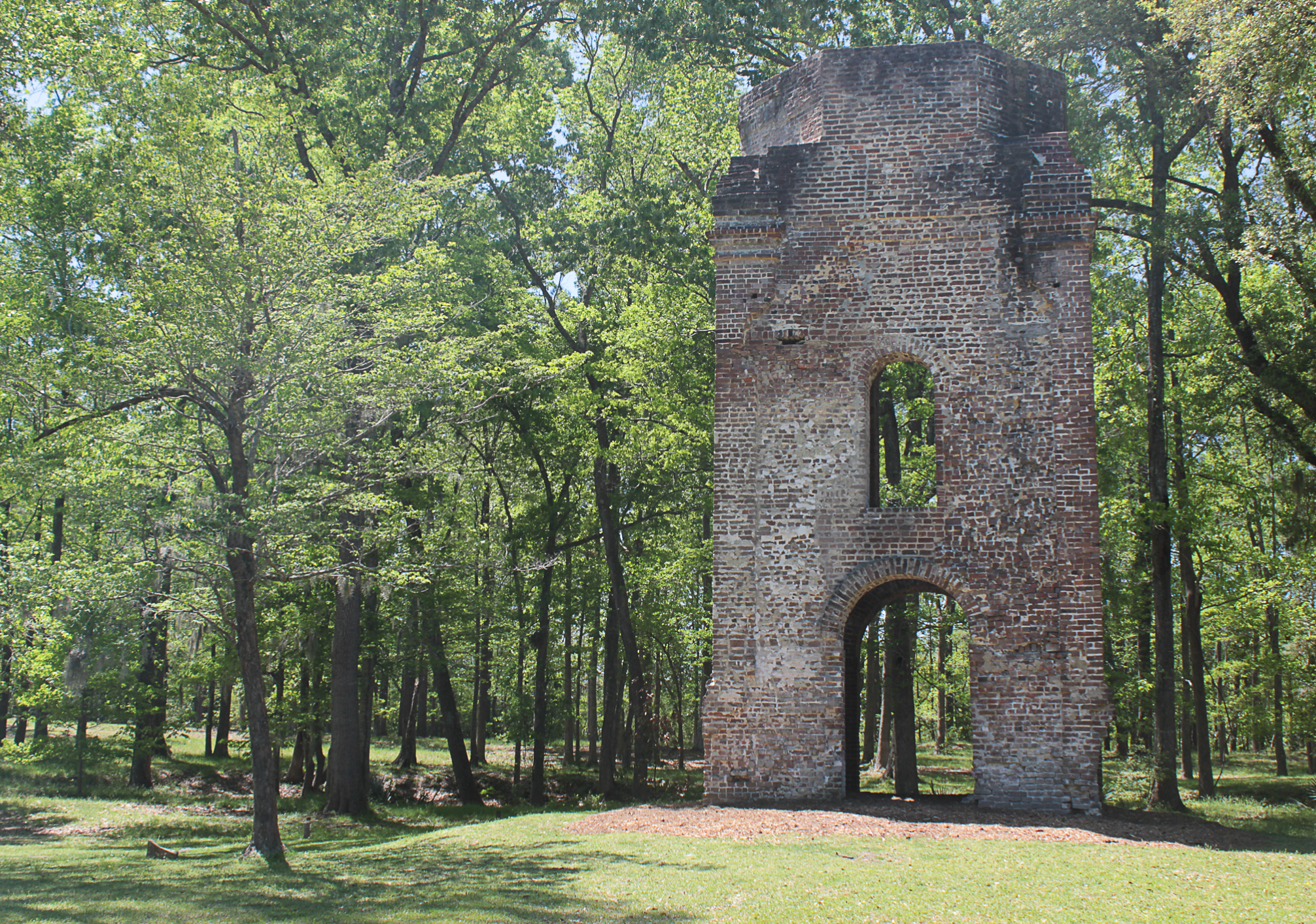
- Colonial Dorchester State Historic Site

- Flag Seal Logo

- Location within the U.S. state of South Carolina
- Interactive map of Dorchester County, South Carolina
- Coordinates: 33.08°N 80.40°W
- Country: United States
- State: South Carolina
- Founded: February 25, 1897
- Named for: Dorchester, Massachusetts
- Seat: St. George
- Largest community: North Charleston

Area
  - Total: 571.18 sq mi (1,479.3 km^{2})
  - Land: 568.59 sq mi (1,472.6 km^{2})
  - Water: 2.59 sq mi (6.7 km^{2}) 0.45%

Population (2020)
  - Total: 161,540
  - Estimate (2025): 178,397 ▲
  - Density: 284.11/sq mi (109.69/km^{2})
- Time zone: UTC−5 (Eastern)
  - Summer (DST): UTC−4 (EDT)
- Congressional districts: 1st, 6th
- Website: www.dorchestercountysc.gov

Dorchester County is located in the U.S. state of South Carolina. As of the 2020 census, the population was 161,540. Its county seat is St. George. The county was created on February 25, 1897 by an act of the South Carolina General Assembly. Dorchester County is included in the Charleston, South Carolina metropolitan area. It is in the Lowcountry region of South Carolina.

== History ==
Dorchester County is named for its first settlement area, which was established by Congregationalists in 1696. These settlers applied the name "Dorchester" after their last residence in Dorchester, Massachusetts.

Dorchester was not established as a separate county until 1897. However, when it was separately established, it came from parts of the neighboring Colleton and Berkeley counties.

== Geography ==
According to the U.S. Census Bureau, the county has a total area of 571.18 square miles (1,479.3 km^{2}), of which 568.59 square miles (1,472.6 km^{2}) is land and 2.59 square miles (6.7 km^{2}) (0.45%) is water.

=== State and local protected areas/sites ===
- Colonial Dorchester State Historic Site
- Edisto River Wildlife Management Area
- Givhans Ferry State Park (part)
- Middleton Place

=== Major water bodies ===
- Ashley River
- Four Hole Swamp
- Edisto River

=== Adjacent counties ===
- Bamberg County – west
- Berkeley County – east
- Charleston County – southeast
- Colleton County – southwest
- Orangeburg County – northwest

=== Major highways ===
- I-26
- I-95
- US 15
- US 17
- US 17 Alt.
- US 17 Alt. Truck
- US 78
- US 178
- SC 27
- SC 61
- SC 61 Conn.
- SC 165
- SC 453
- SC 642

=== Major infrastructure ===
- Summerville Airport

== Demographics ==
Historical population
Census	Pop.	Note	%±
1900	16,294		—
1910	17,891		9.8%
1920	19,459		8.8%
1930	18,956		−2.6%
1940	19,928		5.1%
1950	22,601		13.4%
1960	24,383		7.9%
1970	32,276		32.4%
1980	58,761		82.1%
1990	83,060		41.4%
2000	96,413		16.1%
2010	136,555		41.6%
2020	161,540		18.3%
2025 (est.)	178,397	▲	10.4%
U.S. Decennial Census; 1790–1960 1900–1990; 1990–2000 2010 2020

=== Racial and ethnic composition ===
Dorchester County, South Carolina – Racial and ethnic composition Note: the US Census treats Hispanic/Latino as an ethnic category. This table excludes Latinos from the racial categories and assigns them to a separate category. Hispanics/Latinos may be of any race.
Race / Ethnicity (NH = Non-Hispanic)	Pop 1980	Pop 1990	Pop 2000	Pop 2010	Pop 2020	% 1980	% 1990	% 2000	% 2010	% 2020
White alone (NH)	42,633	61,684	67,578	89,427	99,145	72.55%	74.26%	70.09%	65.49%	61.37%
Black or African American alone (NH)	14,605	19,026	24,067	34,861	38,278	24.85%	22.91%	24.96%	25.53%	23.70%
Native American or Alaska Native alone (NH)	379	540	679	853	886	0.64%	0.65%	0.70%	0.62%	0.55%
Asian alone (NH)	336	741	1,077	2,016	3,286	0.57%	0.89%	1.12%	1.48%	2.03%
Native Hawaiian or Pacific Islander alone (NH)	x	x	63	127	199	x	x	0.07%	0.09%	0.12%
Other race alone (NH)	85	29	91	176	793	0.14%	0.03%	0.09%	0.13%	0.49%
Mixed race or Multiracial (NH)	x	x	1,136	3,020	8,092	x	x	1.18%	2.21%	5.01%
Hispanic or Latino (any race)	723	1,040	1,722	6,075	10,861	1.23%	1.25%	1.79%	4.45%	6.72%
Total	58,761	83,060	96,413	136,555	161,540	100.00%	100.00%	100.00%	100.00%	100.00%

=== 2020 census ===
As of the 2020 census, there were 161,540 people, 57,768 households, and 41,473 families residing in the county.

As of the 2020 census, the median age was 38.0 years. 24.9% of residents were under the age of 18 and 15.1% of residents were 65 years of age or older. For every 100 females there were 94.2 males, and for every 100 females age 18 and over there were 91.0 males age 18 and over.

The racial makeup of the county was 62.8% White, 24.0% Black or African American, 0.7% American Indian and Alaska Native, 2.1% Asian, 0.1% Native Hawaiian and Pacific Islander, 2.8% from some other race, and 7.6% from two or more races. Hispanic or Latino residents of any race comprised 6.7% of the population.

As of the 2020 census, 85.3% of residents lived in urban areas, while 14.7% lived in rural areas.

There were 60,242 households in the county, of which 36.0% had children under the age of 18 living with them and 27.4% had a female householder with no spouse or partner present. About 22.4% of all households were made up of individuals and 9.0% had someone living alone who was 65 years of age or older.

There were 64,608 housing units, of which 6.8% were vacant. Among occupied housing units, 73.2% were owner-occupied and 26.8% were renter-occupied. The homeowner vacancy rate was 1.8% and the rental vacancy rate was 8.1%.

=== 2010 census ===
At the 2010 census, there were 136,555 people, 50,259 households, and 36,850 families living in the county. The population density was 238.2 inhabitants per square mile (92.0/km^{2}). There were 55,186 housing units at an average density of 96.3 units per square mile (37.2 units/km^{2}). The racial makeup of the county was 67.8% white, 25.8% black or African American, 1.5% Asian, 0.7% American Indian, 0.1% Pacific islander, 1.4% from other races, and 2.6% from two or more races. Those of Hispanic or Latino origin made up 4.4% of the population. In terms of ancestry,

Of the 50,259 households, 40.3% had children under the age of 18 living with them, 52.6% were married couples living together, 16.0% had a female householder with no husband present, 26.7% were non-families, and 21.6% of households were made up of individuals. The average household size was 2.68 and the average family size was 3.11. The median age was 35.6 years.

The median household income was $55,034 and the median family income was $63,847. Males had a median income of $45,659 versus $32,221 for females. The per capita income for the county was $24,497. About 9.0% of families and 11.2% of the population were below the poverty line, including 16.4% of those under age 18 and 9.1% of those age 65 or over.

=== 2000 census ===
At the 2000 census, there were 96,413 people, 34,709 households, and 26,309 families living in the county. The population density was 168 people per square mile (65 people/km^{2}). There were 37,237 housing units at an average density of 65 units per square mile (25 units/km^{2}). The racial makeup of the county was 71.05% White, 25.08% Black or African American, 0.73% Native American, 1.13% Asian, 0.07% Pacific Islander, 0.59% from other races, and 1.36% from two or more races. 1.79% of the population were Hispanic or Latino of any race. Of the 34,709 households 40.00% had children under the age of 18 living with them, 57.20% were married couples living together, 14.60% had a female householder with no husband present, and 24.20% were non-families. 20.20% of households were one person and 6.50% were one person aged 65 or older. The average household size was 2.72 and the average family size was 3.13.

The age distribution was 28.90% under the age of 18, 7.70% from 18 to 24, 31.60% from 25 to 44, 22.60% from 45 to 64, and 9.10% 65 or older. The median age was 35 years. For every 100 females, there were 95.80 males. For every 100 females age 18 and over, there were 91.70 males.

The median household income was $43,316 and the median family income was $50,177. Males had a median income of $35,423 versus $24,405 for females. The per capita income for the county was $18,840. About 7.10% of families and 9.70% of the population were below the poverty line, including 11.40% of those under age 18 and 13.30% of those age 65 or over.

== Law and government ==
The governing body of Dorchester County was established in 1970, and was known as the Dorchester County Board of Directors with terms to commence in January 1971. Upon commencement, the body was re-titled as the “Dorchester County Council” and its meeting dates were determined by state law to be held the 1st and 3rd Monday of every month. The seven-member County Council is elected by single-member districts. Dorchester County operates under the Council-Administrator form of government whereby County Council appoints a County Administrator to oversee the day-to-day functions of county government. Jason L. Ward has served as the County Administrator since 2004. He is aided by a Deputy County Administrator and Chief Financial Officer (Daniel T. Prentice), Deputy County Administrator for Public Safety (Mario Formisano), and Assistant County Administrator for Communuity Services (Bryan Havir). This management team oversees multiple departments within their respective directorate.

In addition to senior management reporting to County Council through the County Administrator, seven Countywide elected officials serve four year terms and oversee the following functions:

- Clerk of Court (Cheryl Graham)
- Sheriff (Sam Richardson)
- Auditor (J.J. Messervy)
- Treasurer (Cindy Chitty)
- Probate Judge (Mary Blunt)
- Coroner (Paul Brouthers)
- Register of Deeds (Margaret Bailey)

The South Carolina Department of Corrections operates the Lieber Correctional Institution in Ridgeville in Dorchester County. The prison houses the state's male death row.

=== Politics ===
United States presidential election results for Dorchester County, South Carolina
Year	Republican		Democratic		Third party(ies)	
Year	No.	%	No.	%	No.	%
1900	43	5.29%	770	94.71%	0	0.00%
1904	69	8.90%	706	91.10%	0	0.00%
1908	103	10.39%	883	89.10%	5	0.50%
1912	18	2.97%	576	94.89%	13	2.14%
1916	44	5.77%	716	93.96%	2	0.26%
1920	60	6.42%	874	93.58%	0	0.00%
1924	20	2.79%	697	97.21%	0	0.00%
1928	44	3.83%	1,105	96.17%	0	0.00%
1932	23	1.60%	1,412	98.19%	3	0.21%
1936	28	3.05%	889	96.95%	0	0.00%
1940	110	9.97%	993	90.03%	0	0.00%
1944	65	3.88%	1,181	70.47%	430	25.66%
1948	85	2.88%	143	4.85%	2,722	92.27%
1952	2,319	73.13%	852	26.87%	0	0.00%
1956	504	15.67%	862	26.80%	1,851	57.54%
1960	3,525	59.93%	2,357	40.07%	0	0.00%
1964	5,109	76.11%	1,604	23.89%	0	0.00%
1968	3,354	31.21%	3,855	35.87%	3,539	32.93%
1972	8,095	68.11%	3,606	30.34%	185	1.56%
1976	6,695	45.30%	8,046	54.44%	38	0.26%
1980	10,893	59.53%	7,237	39.55%	168	0.92%
1984	15,289	68.26%	7,037	31.42%	73	0.33%
1988	14,756	66.37%	7,371	33.15%	105	0.47%
1992	15,004	53.53%	9,160	32.68%	3,865	13.79%
1996	15,283	56.63%	9,931	36.80%	1,773	6.57%
2000	20,734	61.63%	12,168	36.17%	739	2.20%
2004	26,006	62.94%	14,733	35.66%	578	1.40%
2008	29,929	57.11%	21,806	41.61%	670	1.28%
2012	32,531	57.22%	23,445	41.24%	879	1.55%
2016	34,987	55.92%	24,055	38.45%	3,525	5.63%
2020	41,913	54.24%	33,824	43.77%	1,541	1.99%
2024	43,839	56.37%	32,489	41.78%	1,436	1.85%

=== Law Enforcement ===
Dorchester County is served by the Dorchester County Sheriff's Office. The current Sheriff is Sam Richardson. They maintain the L.C. Knight Dorchester County Detention Center which opened in 2016.

== Economy ==
In 2022, the GDP of Dorchester County was $5.3 billion (about $30,938 per capita). The real GDP was $4.5 billion ($26,635 per capita) in chained 2017 dollars. Between 2022-2023, the unemployment rate has fluctuated between 2.6-2.9%.

As of April 2024, some of the largest employers in the county include Bosch, Food Lion, Harris Teeter, KION Group, Publix, the town of Summerville, and Walmart.

Employment and Wage Statistics by Industry in Dorchester County, South Carolina
Industry	Employment Counts	Employment Percentage (%)	Average Annual Wage ($)
Accommodation and Food Services	4,273	10.9	21,840
Administrative and Support and Waste Management and Remediation Services	2,204	5.6	47,216
Agriculture, Forestry, Fishing and Hunting	125	0.3	94,068
Arts, Entertainment, and Recreation	738	1.9	22,412
Construction	2,235	5.7	61,412
Educational Services	3,713	9.4	49,816
Finance and Insurance	651	1.7	71,136
Health Care and Social Assistance	3,523	9.0	50,024
Information	354	0.9	77,948
Management of Companies and Enterprises	139	0.4	79,664
Manufacturing	6,148	15.6	70,668
Mining, Quarrying, and Oil and Gas Extraction	31	0.1	73,892
Other Services (except Public Administration)	1,262	3.2	37,752
Professional, Scientific, and Technical Services	1,432	3.6	70,304
Public Administration	2,548	6.5	54,964
Real Estate and Rental and Leasing	618	1.6	60,632
Retail Trade	5,261	13.4	32,396
Transportation and Warehousing	2,708	6.9	46,384
Utilities	134	0.3	77,064
Wholesale Trade	1,264	3.2	84,084
Total	39,361	100.0%	50,415

== Education ==
School districts include:

- Dorchester School District 2
- Dorchester School District 4
  - Districts 1 and 3 merged and created District 4 in 1987.

== Communities ==
=== City ===
- North Charleston (largest community; partly in Berkeley and Charleston counties)

=== Town ===
- Harleyville
- Lincolnville (mostly in Charleston County)
- Reevesville
- Ridgeville
- St. George (county seat)
- Summerville (partly in Berkeley and Charleston counties)

=== Census-designated place ===
- Ladson (partly in Berkeley County and Charleston County)

=== Unincorporated communities ===
- Grover
- Byrds
- Knightsville

=== Ghost town ===
- Dorchester

== See also ==
- List of counties in South Carolina
- National Register of Historic Places listings in Dorchester County, South Carolina
