= U.S. Route 17 Alternate =

Alternate route in South Carolina

U.S. Highway 17 Alternate

- Route of US 17 Alt. in South Carolina highlighted in red

Route information
- Auxiliary route of US 17
- Maintained by SCDOT
- Length: 123.900 mi (199.398 km)
- Existed: 1951–present
- Tourist routes: SC Heritage Corridor: Discovery Route

Major junctions
- South end: US 17 / US 21 near Pocotaligo
- US 15 in Walterboro; US 78 in Summerville; I-26 in Summerville; US 176 in Summerville; US 52 in Moncks Corner; US 521 in Sampit
- North end: US 17 / US 701 in Georgetown

Location
- Country: United States
- State: South Carolina
- Counties: Beaufort, Hampton, Colleton, Dorchester, Berkeley, Williamsburg, Georgetown

Highway system
- United States Numbered Highway System; List; Special; Divided; South Carolina State Highway System; Interstate; US; State; Scenic

U.S. Highway 17 Alternate (US 17 Alt.) is a 123.9-mile (199.4 km) alternate route of US 17 in South Carolina that travels between Pocotaligo and Georgetown. It has been four-laned in various segments since 1970.

== Route description ==
US 17 Alt. starts at the northern terminus of the US 17/US 21 concurrency near Pocotaligo as a two-lane highway. It heads north along US 21 through Yemassee, where it passes over CSX Transportation's Charleston Subdivision and then over South Carolina Highway 68 (SC 68). Due to the presence of a parallel railroad spur along the north side of SC 68, access to and from US 17 Alt./US 21 is only available from bidirectional on/offramps on the southwest and southeast corners of the bridge. The concurrency continues until US 21 splits off on its own to the northwest. From here, it runs through Hendersonville, and then Walterboro, where it merges with SC 63, becomes the northern terminus of SC 303, and the southern terminus of US 15. From that point, US 17 Alt. moves away from Interstate 95 (I-95), running along the southeast side of Lowcountry Regional Airport and moving further northeast. In Summerville, it intersects US 78, has an interchange with I-26, and intersects US 176. At Moncks Corner, it intersects US 52 and is briefly concurrent with that route as the two cross the Dennis C. Bishop Bridge over the Tail Race Canal of the Cooper River just below Lake Moultrie. After crossing the W.H. Andrews Memorial Bridge over the Santee River, it joins another concurrency with US 521 in Sampit, and both routes finally terminate at US 17, along with the southern terminus of US 701 in Georgetown.

== History ==
US 17 Alt. was established in 1951 as a renumbering of mainline US 17 from near Pocotaligo to Walterboro, SC 64 from Walterboro to Moncks Corner, SC 179 from Moncks Corner to Jamestown, and SC 528 north of Jamestown to Sampit. US 17 Alt. was also overlapped with US 52 in Moncks Corner, SC 41 around Jamestown, and US 521 between Sampit and Georgetown.

The first section to be widened to four lanes was in 1970 from US 78 to I-26. This followed with four-lane sections in Georgetown (1974), its concurrency with US 52 in Moncks Corner (1975), and its concurrency with SC 64 in Walterboro (1979). Since the late 1990s, US 17 Alt. has been widening slowly into four-lane from I-26 toward Moncks Corner.

A second US 17 Alt. did exist in South Carolina from 1955 to 1994, from the Georgia state line to Limehouse. Today, it is part of mainline US 17.

== Major intersections ==
County	Location	mi	km	Destinations	Notes
Beaufort		0.000	0.000	US 17 / US 21 south (Trask Parkway) – Beaufort, Savannah	Southern terminus; south end of US 21 concurrency
Hampton	Yemassee	4.020	6.470	SC 68 west (Connely Street) / Flowers Street south (US 17 Conn. south) to I-95 – Hampton, Allendale	Eastern terminus of SC 68; northern terminus of US 17 Conn.
Colleton		7.400	11.909	US 21 north (Low Country Highway) – Smoaks	North end of US 21 concurrency
Colleton	Walterboro	22.600	36.371	SC 63 west (Sniders Highway) – Varnville	South end of SC 63 concurrency
Colleton	Walterboro	24.020	38.656	SC 303 south (Green Pond Highway) – Green Pond	Northern terminus of SC 303
Colleton	Walterboro	24.340	39.171	SC 63 east (Hampton Street) – Jacksonboro	North end of SC 63 concurrency; to USC Salkehatchie
Colleton	Walterboro	24.510	39.445	US 15 north (Jefferies Boulevard) – St. George	Southern terminus of US 15
Colleton	Walterboro	24.720	39.783	SC 64 Bus. west (Paul Street) – St. George, Barnwell	South end of SC 64 Bus. concurrency
Colleton	Walterboro	25.310	40.732	SC 64 Bus. east (Padgett Loop) – Jacksonboro, Charleston	North end of SC 64 Bus. concurrency
Colleton	Walterboro	26.150	42.084	SC 64 (Robertson Boulevard) – Barnwell, Jacksonboro, Charleston	To USC Salkehatchie
Colleton	Cottageville	35.430	57.019	SC 651 north (Rehoboth Road)	Southern terminus of SC 651
Dorchester	The Forks	48.567	78.161	SC 61 north – Ridgeville	North end of SC 61 concurrency; to Givhans Ferry State Park
Dorchester	The Forks	48.974	78.816	SC 61 south (Beech Hill Road) – Charleston	South end of SC 61 concurrency
Dorchester	Slandsville	50.871	81.869	SC 642 east (Dorchester Road) – North Charleston	Southern terminus of US 17 Alt. Trk.; western terminus of SC 642; to Charleston AFB
Dorchester	Summerville	57.180	92.022	US 78 (Fifth Street) – Charleston, Ridgeville	
Berkeley	Summerville	57.980	93.310	SC 165 south (Berlin G. Myers Parkway) / Berkeley Circle north – Ravenel	Northern terminus of US 17 Alt. Trk./SC 165; southern terminus of Berkeley Circle
Berkeley	Summerville	58.749– 58.920	94.547– 94.823	I-26 – Charleston, Columbia	I-26 exits 199 A-B
Berkeley	Goose Creek	62.630	100.793	US 176 – Goose Creek, Charleston, Holly Hill	
Berkeley	Moncks Corner	73.280	117.933	SC 6 (Main Street) / SC 6 Truck begins – Charleston, Holly Hill	Southern end of SC 6 Truck concurrency; western terminus of SC 6 Truck
Berkeley	Moncks Corner	74.750	120.298	US 52 south / SC 6 Truck east – Charleston	Northern end of SC 6 Truck concurrency; southern end of US 52 concurrency
Berkeley		76.377	122.917	To SC 402 – Cordesville, Huger	Western terminus of access road
Berkeley		76.520	123.147	US 52 north – St. Stephen, Kingstree, Florence	North end of US 52 concurrency
Berkeley		90.750	146.048	SC 45 north (Santee River Road) – Alvin, St. Stephen	North end of SC 45 concurrency
Berkeley	Jamestown	94.440	151.986	SC 41 south / SC 45 south – McClellanville, Charleston	South end of SC 41 and SC 45 concurrencies
Williamsburg	No major junctions				
Georgetown	No major junctions				
Williamsburg–Georgetown county line		100.390	161.562	SC 41 north – Andrews	North end of SC 41 concurrency
Georgetown	Sampit	114.290	183.932	US 521 north (Georgetown Highway) – Andrews	South end of US 521 concurrency
Georgetown	Georgetown	123.730	199.124	US 521 north (Highmarket Highway) – Myrtle Beach, Charleston	North end of US 521 concurrency
Georgetown	Georgetown	123.900	199.398	US 17 / US 701 north – Pawleys Island, Myrtle Beach, Conway, Charleston	Northern terminus; southern terminus of US 701
1.000 mi = 1.609 km; 1.000 km = 0.621 mi: Concurrency terminus

== Summerville truck route ==
U.S. Highway 17 Alternate Truck
- Location: Summerville
- Length: 8.242 mi (13.264 km)

U.S. Highway 17 Alternate Truck (US 17 Alt. Truck) is a 8.242-mile-long (13.264 km) truck route for US 17 Alt., mostly within the city limits of Summerville. It serves portions of southeastern Dorchester County and a very brief portion of southwestern Berkeley County. It is entirely concurrent with SC 91 for its entire length.

Before the completion of the Berlin G. Myers Parkway, US 17 Alt. Truck began at an intersection with US 17 Alt. southwest of Summerville, in the southeastern part of Dorchester County. This intersection was also the western terminus of SC 642. US 17 Alt. Truck and SC 642 traveled on Dorchester Road nearly in a due east direction before they curved to an east-southeast direction. In Limehouse Crossroads, they intersected SC 165 (Bacons Bridge Road). US 17 Alt. Truck left SC 642 and turned left onto SC 165. The two highways traveled to the north-northeast. Almost immediately, they crossed over Dorchester Creek and the Sawmill Branch Trail and entered a southern part of Summerville. Just north of the intersection with the northern terminus of Jimbo Road, they left the city limits. They intersected the western terminus of Mikel Drive and the eastern terminus of Edisto Drive, which led to Flowertown Elementary and Newington Elementary schools. A short distance later, they reentered Summerville together. Almost immediately, they both intersected the northern terminus of Trolley Road. Here, US 17 Alt. Truck and SC 165, as well as the Bacons Bridge Road name, turned left. They proceeded to the north-northwest. They crossed over Sawmill Branch just before they intersected the southern terminus of both East Carolina Avenue and Berlin G. Myers Parkway. US 17 Alt. Truck and SC 165 turned right onto the parkway and travel to the northeast. They both passed Summerville Elementary School and Rollings Middle School of the Arts. They crossed over East Richardson Avenue and some railroad tracks of Norfolk Southern Railway on an unnamed bridge before intersecting East 3rd North Street at the Senator Randy Scott Intersection. This road leads to the Summerville Visitors Center. Almost immediately is an intersection with US 78 (East 5th North Street). US 17 Alt. Truck and SC 165 both continued to the northeast and entered the southwestern part of Berkeley County, before curving to the north-northwest. They intersect US 17 Alt. (North Main Street). Here, both US 17 Alt. Truck and SC 165 reached their northern terminus, and the roadway continues as Berkeley County Circle to the north-northwest.

County	Location	mi	km	Destinations	Notes
Dorchester		0.000	0.000	US 17 Alt. / SC 642 begins – Walterboro, Bamberg, Summerville	Southern end of SC 642 concurrency; southern terminus of US 17 Alt. Trk.; western terminus of SC 642
Dorchester	Limehouse Crossroads	2.832	4.558	SC 165 south (Bacons Bridge Road) / SC 642 east (Dorchester Road) – Charleston, Charleston A.F.B.	Northern end of SC 642 concurrency; southern end of SC 165 concurrency
Dorchester	Summerville	5.512	8.871	East Carolina Avenue north to US 17 Alt.	Southern terminus of East Carolina Avenue
Dorchester	Summerville	7.392	11.896	US 78 (East 5th North Street) – St. George, Charleston	
Berkeley	Summerville	8.242	13.264	US 17 Alt. (North Main Street) / SC 165 ends to I-26 / Berkeley Circle north – Walterboro, Moncks Corner	Northern end of SC 165 concurrency; northern terminus of US 17 Alt. Trk./SC 165; southern terminus of Berkeley Circle
1.000 mi = 1.609 km; 1.000 km = 0.621 mi: Concurrency terminus

== See also ==
- Special routes of U.S. Route 17
