= South Carolina Highway 91 =

South Carolina Highway 91
- Berlin G. Myers Parkway
- SC 91 highlighted in red

Route information
- Maintained by SCDOT
- Length: 5.670 mi (9.125 km)
- Existed: April 2025–present

Major junctions
- South end: US 17 Alt. / US 17 Alt. Truck near Summerville
- SC 165 in Summerville; US 78 in Summerville
- North end: US 17 Alt. / US 17 Alt. Truck in Summerville

Location
- Country: United States
- State: South Carolina
- Counties: Dorchester, Berkeley

Highway system
- South Carolina State Highway System; Interstate; US; State; Scenic
| ← SC 90 | → SC 92 |

South Carolina Highway 91 (SC 91) is a state highway that is located in Summerville. This route is intended to improve traffic safety and reduce congestion in the Summerville area, bypassing the Five Points of Summerville intersection. It also is entirely concurrent with US Highway 17 Alternate Truck (US 17 Alt. Truck).

== Route description ==
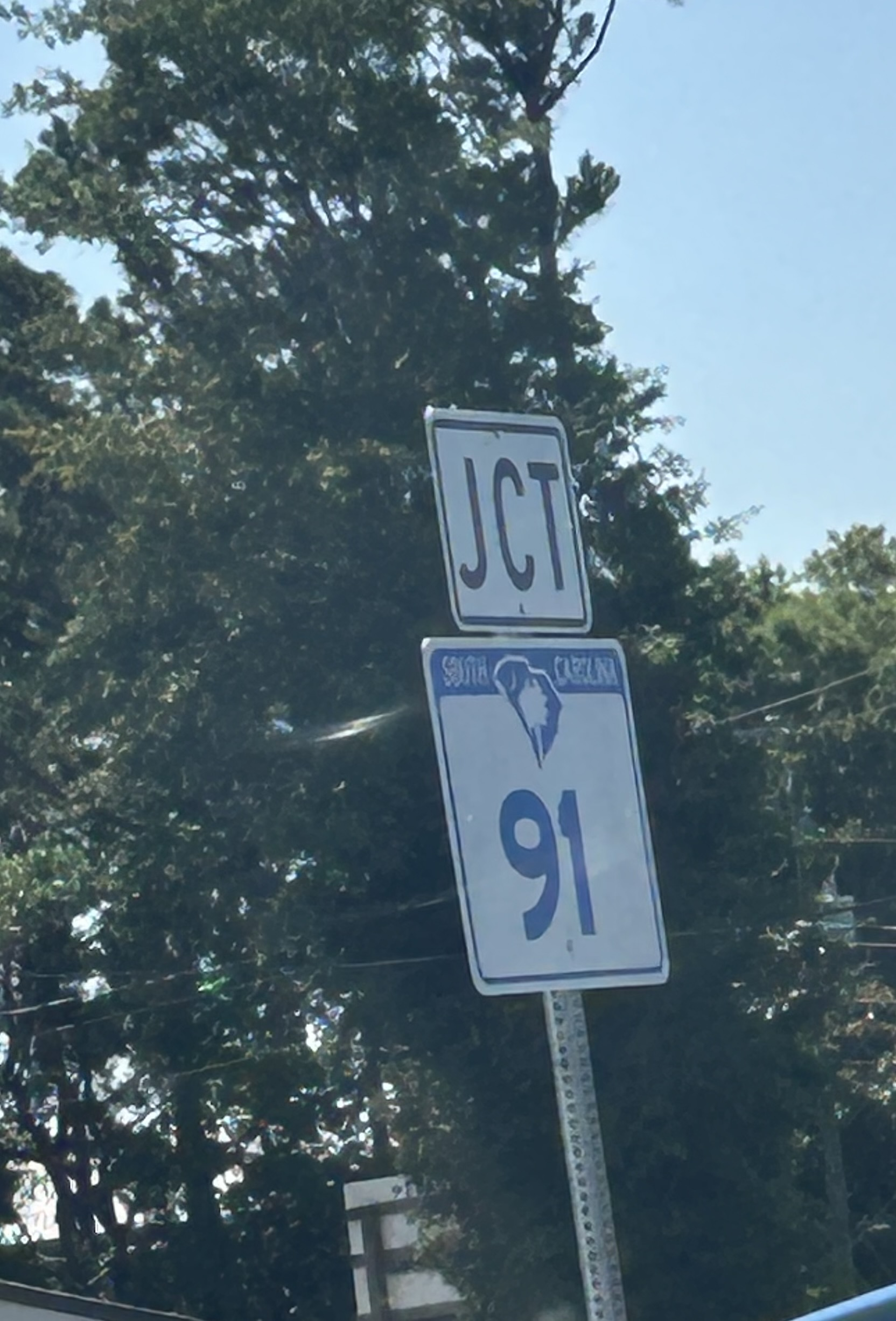
SC 91 Junction Shield

SC 91 begins with US 17 Alt Truck at an intersection with US 17 Alt. west of Summerville. The highways then generally head in a northeast direction, paralleling mainline US 17 Alt. closely. The highways first meet SC 165, which heads south toward SC 61 and Ravenel. Next, they both intersect US 78 after crossing the Berkeley County line. Finally, SC 91 and US 17 Alt. Truck end back at US 17 Alt., just short of Interstate 26.

After this highway was designated, SC 165 and SC 642 were truncated off of the parkway. SC 165 ends at SC 91 via a SPUI interchange and SC 642 now ends south of the parkway at US 17 Alt.

== History ==
South Carolina Highway 91
- Location: Union County-York County
- Existed: 1923–1956

SC 91 had one previous iteration. The original SC 91 was established in 1923 as a new primary routing running from SC 9 near Lockhart to SC 5 (which is now SC 211) in Sharon. In 1937, SC 91 was extended west with SC 9 to Lockhart, then southwest as a new primary routing to end at SC 92 (now SC 49-215 Connector) in Monarch. In 1940, it was extended north as a new primary routing to present-day SC 5. In 1947, SC 91 was truncated back to [Old] SC 5, leaving behind S-46-23. In 1951, it was rerouted west of Lockhart to meet SC 9 at the SC 98 junction in Mount Tabor. The old road to Lockhart became S-44-10 (which was later partially absorbed by today's SC 49). Also, it was extended northeast to replace part of [Old] SC 5 to end at US 321 (which is now US 321 Bus.) in York. In 1956, SC 91 was renumbered as SC 49. The reroute to Mount Tabor is part of SC 105. Between Monarch and SC 5, SC 91 used Old Lower Lockhart Road, Frank Hill Loop, and Phillipi Church/Wesley Church Road.

== Major intersections ==
| County | Location | mi | km | Destinations | Notes |
|---|---|---|---|---|---|
| Dorchester | Summerville | 0.000 | 0.000 | US 17 Alt. / US 17 Alt. Truck – Walterboro | Southern terminus; southern end of US 17 Alt Truck concurrency; southern terminus of US 17 Alt Truck |
| Dorchester | Summerville | 3.0 | 4.8 | SC 165 (East Carolina Avenue) – Ravenel | To SC 61/Ashley River Road |
| Berkeley | Summerville | 4.9 | 7.9 | US 78 – St. George, Goose Creek, Charleston | |
| Berkeley | Summerville | 3.234 | 5.205 | US 17 Alt. / US 17 Alt. Truck to I-26 – Moncks Corner | Northern terminus; northern end of US 17 Alt Truck concurrency; northern terminus of US 17 Alt Truck |
1.000 mi = 1.609 km; 1.000 km = 0.621 mi: Concurrency terminus

== See also ==
- South Carolina Highway 49
