= South Carolina Highway 652 =

State highway in South Carolina, United States

South Carolina Highway 652
- Calf Pen Bay Road

Route information
- Maintained by SCDOT
- Length: 10.480 mi (16.866 km)

Major junctions
- West end: US 601 in Pineland
- East end: US 278 near Ridgeland

Location
- Country: United States
- State: South Carolina
- Counties: Jasper

Highway system
- South Carolina State Highway System; Interstate; US; State; Scenic
← SC 651	→ SC 692

South Carolina Highway 652 (SC 652) is a 10.480-mile-long (16.866 km) state highway in the U.S. state of South Carolina. The highway travels through rural areas of Jasper County. It is known as Calf Pen Bay Road for its entire length.

== Route description ==
SC 652 begins at an intersection with U.S. Route 601 (US 601; Cypress Branch Road) in Pineland. It travels to the east-northeast and curves to the southeast until it meets its eastern terminus, an intersection with US 278 (Grays Highway) at a point north-northwest of Ridgeland.

== Major intersections ==
The entire route is in Jasper County.

Location	mi	km	Destinations	Notes
Pineland	0.000	0.000	US 601 (Cypress Branch Road) – Tarboro, Furman, Hampton	Western terminus
	10.480	16.866	US 278 (Grays Highway) – Ridgeland, Varnville, Hampton	Eastern terminus
1.000 mi = 1.609 km; 1.000 km = 0.621 mi
