= South Carolina Highway 651 =

State highway in South Carolina, United States

South Carolina Highway 651
- Rehoboth Road

Route information
- Maintained by SCDOT
- Length: 8.270 mi (13.309 km)

Major junctions
- South end: US 17 Alt. in Cottageville
- North end: SC 61 near Canadys

Location
- Country: United States
- State: South Carolina
- Counties: Colleton

Highway system
- South Carolina State Highway System; Interstate; US; State; Scenic
← SC 642	→ SC 652

South Carolina Highway 651 (SC 651) is a 8.270-mile-long (13.309 km) state highway in the U.S. state of South Carolina. The highway connects Cottageville with rural areas of Colleton County. It is known as Rehoboth Road for its entire length.

== Route description ==
SC 651 begins at an intersection with U.S. Route 17 Alternate (US 17 Alt.; Cottageville Highway) in Cottageville, within Colleton County. It travels to the north-northeast and almost immediately leaves the city limits. The highway curves to the north-northwest and then heads on a fairly northerly direction before crossing over Horse Pen Branch. It curves again to the north-northwest and meets its northern terminus, an intersection with SC 61 (Augusta Highway).

== Major intersections ==
The entire route is in Colleton County.

Location	mi	km	Destinations	Notes
Cottageville	0.000	0.000	US 17 Alt. (Cottageville Highway) – Long Creek, Toccoa, Seneca	Western terminus
	8.270	13.309	SC 61 (Augusta Highway) – Walhalla	Eastern terminus
1.000 mi = 1.609 km; 1.000 km = 0.621 mi
