= Dwight Smith (baseball) =

American baseball player (1963–2022)

- Outfielder
- Born: November 8, 1963; Tallahassee, Florida, U.S.
- Died: July 22, 2022 (aged 58); Peachtree City, Georgia, U.S.
- Batted: Left Threw: Right

MLB debut
- May 1, 1989, for the Chicago Cubs

Last MLB appearance
- September 29, 1996, for the Atlanta Braves

MLB statistics
- Batting average: .275
- Home runs: 46
- Runs batted in: 226
- Stats at Baseball Reference

Teams
- Chicago Cubs (1989–1993); California Angels (1994); Baltimore Orioles (1994); Atlanta Braves (1995–1996)

Career highlights and awards
- World Series champion (1995)

John Dwight Smith Sr. (November 8, 1963 – July 22, 2022) was an American outfielder in Major League Baseball who played for four teams from 1989 to 1996, primarily the Chicago Cubs.

As a rookie with the Cubs, he batted .324 with 52 runs batted in (RBI) as the team captured a division title, and he was runner-up behind teammate Jerome Walton in voting for the National League (NL) Rookie of the Year Award. He was increasingly used as a pinch hitter in his five seasons with the team. After a season split between two American League (AL) clubs, he played two final seasons with the Atlanta Braves, helping them win the 1995 World Series title. His son, Dwight Smith Jr., is a former major league outfielder who most recently played in the Atlantic League of Professional Baseball.

== Early life and amateur career ==
Smith was born in Tallahassee, Florida. He was the youngest of four children. His father died when he was seven years old.

Smith attended Wade Hampton High School in Varnville, South Carolina, and played for the school's baseball and football teams. He enrolled at Spartanburg Methodist College in 1983. Playing college baseball for Spartanburg, Smith competed in the Junior College World Series.

== Professional career ==
=== Chicago Cubs (1984–1993) ===
The Chicago Cubs selected Smith in the third round of the 1984 MLB draft. He made his professional debut with the Pikeville Cubs of the Rookie-level Appalachian League, struggling to a .236 batting average, but his 39 stolen bases were the most in the league. He batted .289 with 30 stolen bases for the Geneva Cubs of the Class A-Short Season New York-Penn League in 1985 and .310 with 53 stolen bases for the Peoria Chiefs of the Class A Midwest League in 1986. Smith played for the Pittsfield Cubs of the Class AA Eastern League in 1987, batting .337 with 18 home runs, and leading the league with 60 stolen bases and 111 runs scored. He was promoted to the Iowa Cubs of the Class AAA American Association in 1988. Though he batted .293 for Iowa, he returned there for the start of the 1989 season because the Cubs felt that he needed to improve his defense.

After batting .325 in 21 games for Iowa, the Cubs promoted Smith to the major leagues due to injuries on the major league team. He made his debut with the Cubs on May 1, and batted .324 as a rookie, with nine home runs and 52 runs batted in. Smith finished second in balloting for the NL Rookie of the Year Award behind teammate Jerome Walton, who collected 22 of 24 first-place votes; Smith received the other two. Smith batted 3-for-15 (.200) for the Cubs in the NL Championship Series (NLCS), which they lost to the San Francisco Giants.

Smith struggled in the 1990 season and lost his starting job. He batted .262 for the 1990 season, and the Cubs signed George Bell to play in the outfield. Smith was again a bench player with the Cubs in the 1991 season. He batted .228 in 167 at bats in 1991. Smith began the 1992 season in a platoon with Sammy Sosa playing in left field, but was demoted to the minor leagues from late April to late May after starting the season batting .217. Smith finished the season with a .276 average, three home runs, and 24 RBIs, and signed a one-year contract worth $630,000 for the 1993 season. In 1993, Smith had a .300 batting average and a career-best 11 home runs. Under pressure to reduce their salary obligations, the Cubs did not offer Smith salary arbitration after the 1993 season, making him a free agent.

=== Later career (1994–1998) ===
The California Angels signed Smith to a one-year contract for the 1994 season, worth a reported $700,000. He began the 1994 season in a platoon with Bo Jackson, but became a bench player on June 1 when the Angels began to play Jim Edmonds on a daily basis. Smith requested a trade, and the Angels traded Smith to the Baltimore Orioles for a player to be named later on June 15. For California and Baltimore, Smith batted .281 with eight home runs and 30 RBIs in 73 games.

Smith signed a one-year contract worth $250,000 with the Atlanta Braves for the 1995 season, agreeing to be a bench player. He batted .252 with three home runs and 21 RBIs in 103 games during the 1995 season. In the postseason, Smith appeared as a pinch hitter, batting 2-for-3 in the Division Series against the Colorado Rockies and 0-for-2 in the NL Championship Series against the Cincinnati Reds. In the 1995 World Series, Smith batted 1-for-2 with a walk, as the Braves defeated the Cleveland Indians in six games. Smith re-signed with the Braves for the 1996 season, agreeing to a one-year contract with a $350,000 salary. He batted .203 for the Braves during the 1996 season, and was not included on their postseason roster.

In 1997, no major league teams made a contract offer to Smith. He signed with the Tampa Bay Devil Rays, an expansion team set to debut in 1998, and they assigned him to the Mexico City Tigers of the Mexican League for the 1997 season. An injury to his sciatic nerve prevented Smith from playing, and the Devil Rays released him in May. After he recuperated, Smith played for the St. Paul Saints of the Northern League, an independent baseball league, in 1997. The Devil Rays signed Smith before the 1998 season and invited him to spring training. They gave him his unconditional release before the beginning of the season. In 1998, Smith played for the Rochester Red Wings, a minor league affiliate of the Orioles.

== Personal life ==
Smith began singing when he was four years old in his church choir. During the baseball offseasons, he sang in nightclubs and talent shows. On July 21, 1989, at Wrigley Field, Smith sang "The Star-Spangled Banner" before a game against the San Francisco Giants. He also sang the national anthem on Opening Day of the 1992 season. During the 1993–94 offseason, Smith recorded a demo rhythm and blues album titled R U Down.

Smith and his wife Cheryl had one son and two daughters. His son Dwight Smith Jr. also played in the major leagues.

Smith was arrested for driving under the influence and cannabis possession in Tyrone, Georgia, on November 22, 2003. He was arrested for cocaine possession and driving with a suspended license in Peachtree City, Georgia, on September 6, 2006.

Smith died on July 22, 2022, of congestive heart and lung failure.
