= Alpha Genesis =

Company that breeds primates for biomedical research

Alpha Genesis Incorporated (AGI) is a company in Yemassee, South Carolina, that breeds cynomolgous, rhesus, green, and capuchin monkeys for use in research. The company also manages the federal macaque colony on Morgan Island, South Carolina, known as "Monkey Island" for its free-ranging monkey rhesus macaques. Led by CEO Greg Westergaard, the company is one of the world's largest of its kind. AGI also provides long-term care and retirement housing for research primates after studies are completed.

According to the United States Department of Agriculture, AGI is a Class B dealer subject to inspections under the Animal Welfare Act, and its facilities are accredited by the Association for Assessment and Accreditation of Laboratory Animal Care (AAALAC) and operate in accordance with Public Health Service policy.

== Operations ==
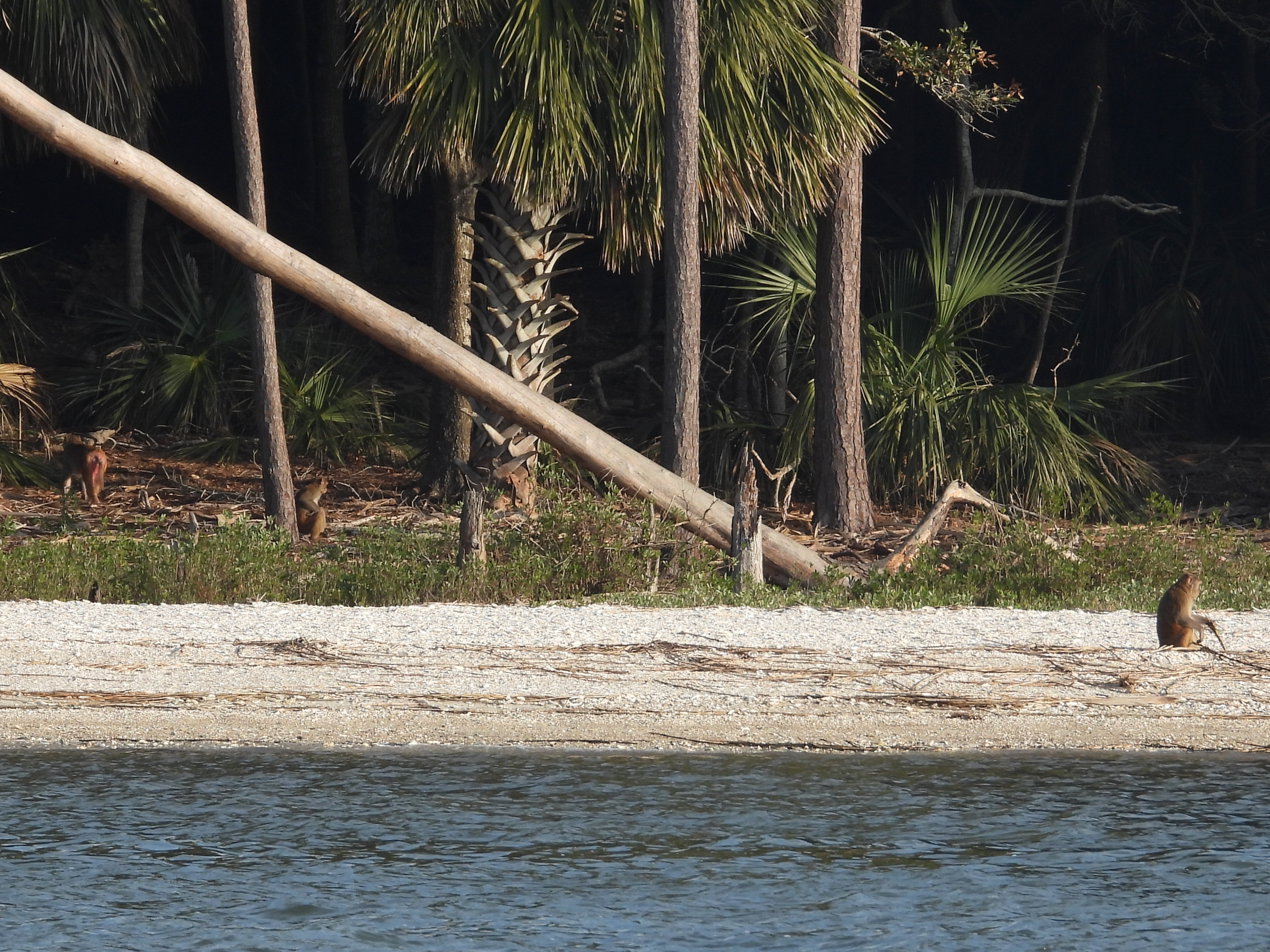
A small group of free-ranging rhesus macaques on Morgan Island

AGI operates multiple research and breeding facilities across South Carolina, encompassing large-scale primate enclosures, laboratory spaces, and research buildings.

The company operates on over 100 acres and maintains purpose-built facilities for breeding, quarantine, and long-term housing of nonhuman primates (NHPs), including CDC-compliant quarantine infrastructure for imported research animals. The campuses include controlled-access housing, biosecure outdoor enclosures, and quarantine suites engineered for containment and compliance with federal regulations.

The company's facilities are designed to meet regulatory standards, including those set by the USDA and the National Institutes of Health (NIH). Its facilities operate in accordance with the Public Health Service Policy on Humane Care and Use of Laboratory Animals, with standard operating procedures for intake, health screening, and pathogen exclusion.

AGI maintains colonies of rhesus macaques (Macaca mulatta), cynomolgus macaques (Macaca fascicularis), and other NHPs used in biomedical research. Most of AGI's colonies are maintained as specific-pathogen-free (SPF) populations to meet research requirements.

The company says it employs veterinarians, research scientists, and animal care staff to ensure its primate population's well-being and compliance with ethical research guidelines. But according to The New Yorker, AGI, like other animal research facilities, has been repeatedly cited by USDA inspectors.

Since 2008, AGI has received more than $120 million in government contracts, including $19 million in 2024 from the National Institutes of Health.

== Research and services ==
AGI supports biomedical and pharmaceutical research through its services involving nonhuman primates, which are used by academic institutions, government agencies, and private-sector clients in various therapeutic areas.

The company conducts pharmacokinetics (PK), toxicology, and safety studies to evaluate new pharmaceutical compounds before they advance to human trials, and provides support for research into cognitive function, affective disorders, and neurological conditions using primate models.

AGI contributes to studies in gene therapy, immune system disorders, and metabolic conditions such as diabetes and obesity. It also maintains breeding colonies of rhesus and cynomolgus macaques that are free from specific pathogens and can be genetically selected to meet research needs.

== 2024 monkey escape and animal welfare concerns ==
On November 6, 2024, a caretaker failed to latch the double doors to an enclosure for female rhesus macaques, and 43 monkeys left the enclosure and took up residence in nearby trees. To catch the monkeys, company officials laid out traps with fresh fruit and vegetables and deployed infrared cameras. By January 24, 2025, all 43 monkeys had been recaptured and were reported to be in good health. People for the Ethical Treatment of Animals (PETA) disputed this, and in late November 2024 filed complaints with the USDA accusing AGI of previous violations of federal animal cruelty laws.

A USDA investigation found that the 2024 escape did not constitute a critical violation, and the National Institutes of Health closed its investigation in January 2025. But a USDA inspection dated December 9, 2024, listed a critical violation in relation to the deaths of 22 monkeys in a separate incident. In July 2025, the USDA issued an official warning to AGI about the December 2024 deaths.

The November 2024 escape was the largest monkey exodus at AGI but not the first. According to a New Yorker investigation, "at least 67 other monkeys, in eleven separate incidents, have escaped from their cages in the past decade." A South Carolina newspaper reported that the 2024 incident was the third mass escape at the facility in the decade, including groups of 19 monkeys in 2016 and 26 monkeys in 2014.
