= South Carolina Highway 642 =

State highway in South Carolina, United States

South Carolina Highway 642
- Dorchester Road

Route information
- Maintained by SCDOT
- Length: 19.292 mi (31.047 km)
- Existed: 1939–present

Major junctions
- West end: US 17 Alt. near Summerville
- I-526 in North Charleston; I-26 in North Charleston
- East end: US 52 / US 78 in North Charleston

Location
- Country: United States
- State: South Carolina
- Counties: Dorchester, Charleston

Highway system
- South Carolina State Highway System; Interstate; US; State; Scenic
← SC 641	→ SC 651

South Carolina Highway 642 (SC 642, also known as Dorchester Road), is a 19.292-mile (31.047 km) state highway in the southeastern part of the U.S. state of South Carolina. It travels within the Summerville and North Charleston areas.

== Route description ==
SR 642 runs for 19.3 miles (31.1 km) from U.S. Route 17 Alternate (US 17 Alt.) southwest of Summerville to US 52/US 78 in North Charleston. Dorchester Road is a heavily congested highway during morning and evening traffic periods.

== History ==
Current plans call for widening of the road from Summerville to US 52/US 78 Alternate. This has been not been completed and will widen the road to a total of 6 lanes with some turning lanes.

== Major intersections ==
County	Location	mi	km	Destinations	Notes
Dorchester		0.000	0.000	US 17 Alt. (US 17 Alt. Truck begins) – Walterboro, Bamberg, Summerville	Western end of US 17 Alt. Truck concurrency; western terminus of SC 642; southern terminus of US 17 Alt. Truck
Dorchester		2.832	4.558	SC 165 (Bacons Bridge Road / US 17 Alt. Truck north) – Summerville, Charleston	Eastern end of US 17 Alt. Truck concurrency
Charleston	North Charleston	16.542– 16.602	26.622– 26.718	I-526 (Mark Clark Expressway) – Mt. Pleasant, West Ashley, SC	I-526 exit 15
Charleston	North Charleston	18.602	29.937	I-26 – Columbia, Charleston	I-26 exit 215
Charleston	North Charleston	19.292	31.047	US 52 / US 78 (Rivers Avenue)	Eastern terminus
1.000 mi = 1.609 km; 1.000 km = 0.621 mi
