= Hattie J. Peeples House =

Historic house in South Carolina, United States

- U.S. National Register of Historic Places
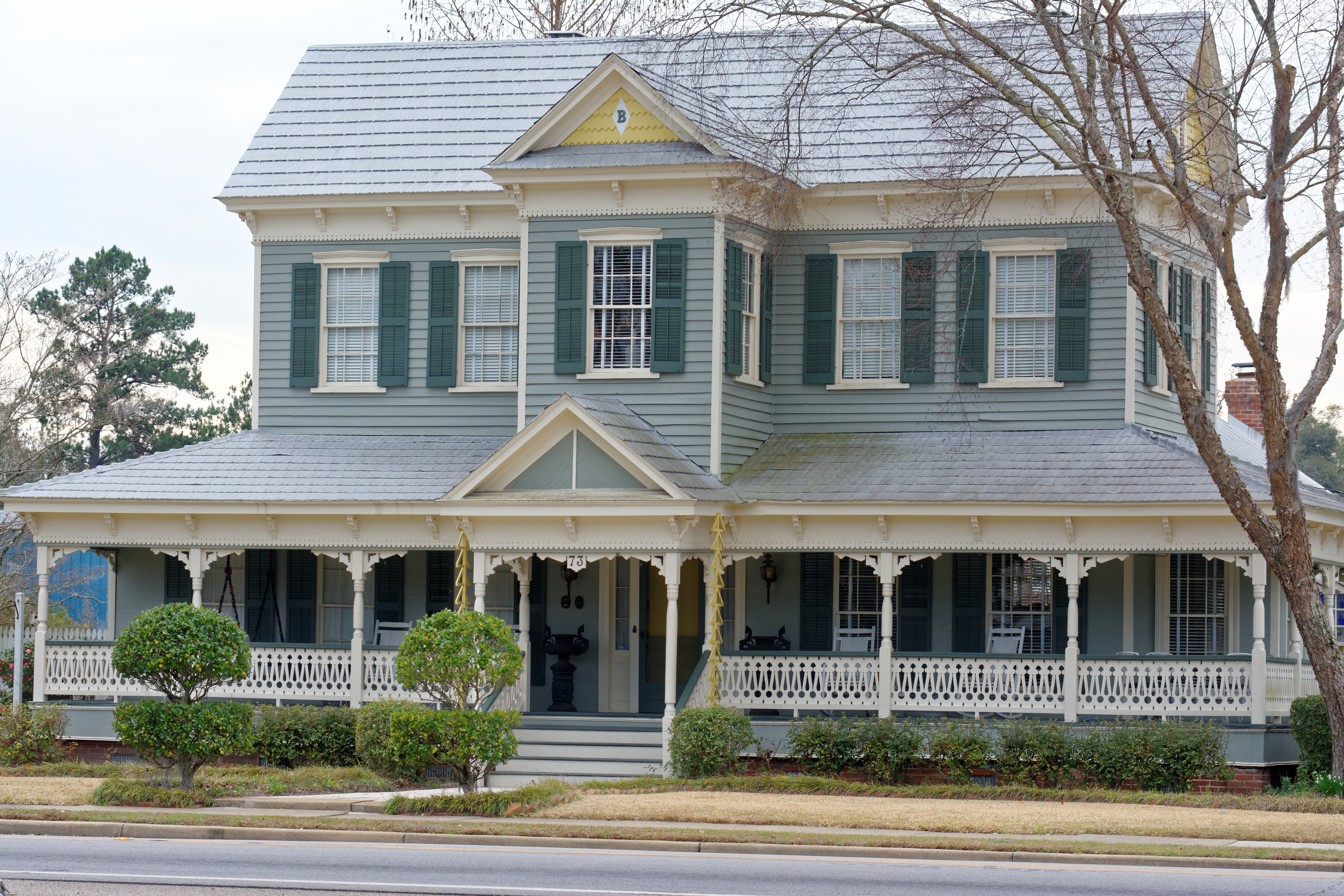
- The house in 2017

- Location within South Carolina Location within the United States
- Location: 109 Carolina Ave. W., Varnville, South Carolina
- Coordinates: 32.85063°N 81.08131°W
- Area: less than one acre
- Built: 1889-1893
- Architectural style: Italianate, Queen Anne
- NRHP reference No.: 92001299
- Added to NRHP: October 13, 1992

Hattie J. Peeples House is a historic home located at Varnville, Hampton County, South Carolina. It was built between 1889 and 1893, and is an L-shaped, two-story, five-bay, Italianate-style dwelling. It has a gable roof and weatherboard siding. It features a projecting pavilion, encircling porch, and textured wall surfaces in the Queen Anne style. Also on the property are a frame and weatherboard butler's quarters (1885); and a brick building built to replace an earlier frame structure destroyed by a fire in 1917. This building served as a post office from the time of its construction about 1920 until 1964. Hattie J. Peeples served for more than 30 years as postmistress.

It was listed on the National Register of Historic Places in 1992.
