= Dwight Smith Jr. =

American baseball player (born 1992)

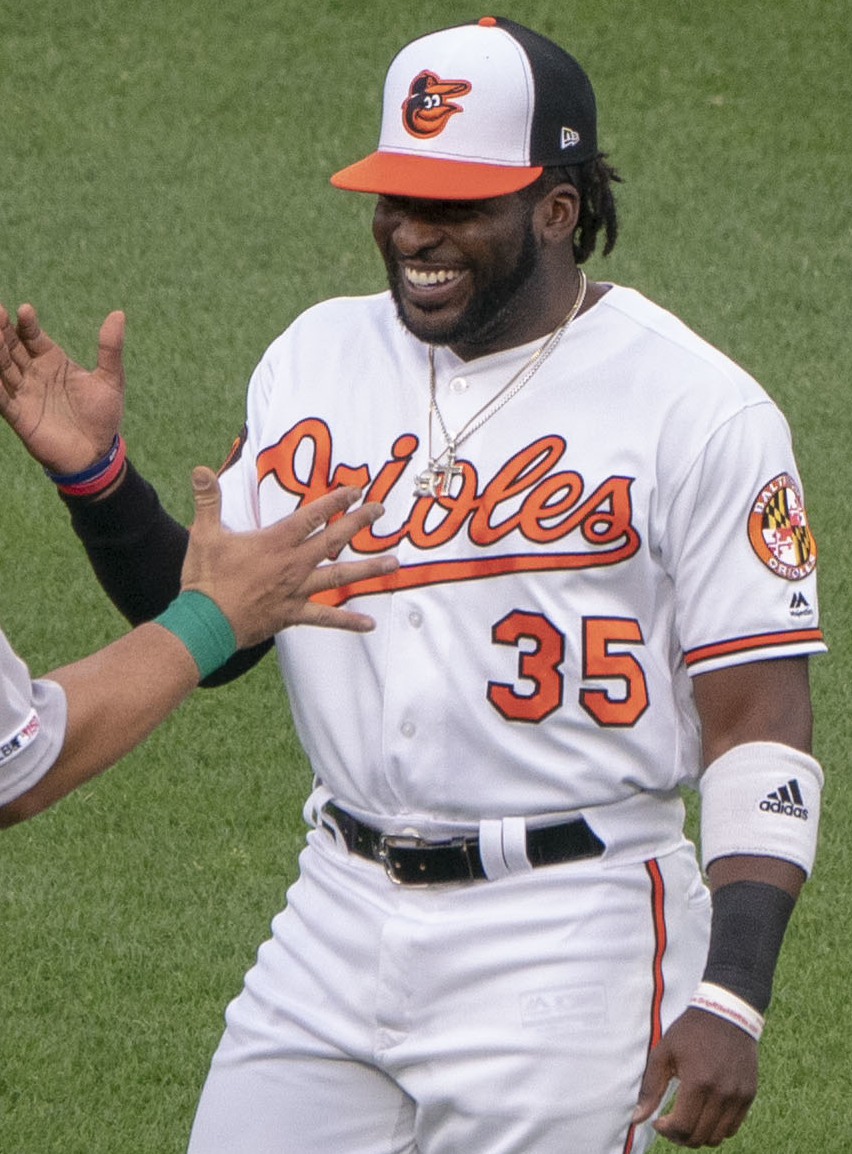
- Smith with the Baltimore Orioles in 2019

El Águila de Veracruz
- Outfielder
- Born: October 26, 1992 (age 33); Peachtree City, Georgia, U.S.
- Bats: Left Throws: Right

MLB debut
- May 18, 2017, for the Toronto Blue Jays

MLB statistics (through 2020 season)
- Batting average: .254
- Home runs: 17
- Runs batted in: 67
- Stats at Baseball Reference

Teams
- Toronto Blue Jays (2017–2018); Baltimore Orioles (2019–2020)

John Dwight Smith Jr. (born October 26, 1992) is an American professional baseball outfielder for El Águila de Veracruz of the Mexican League. He has previously played in Major League Baseball (MLB) for the Toronto Blue Jays and Baltimore Orioles.

== Personal life ==
Smith is the son of former MLB player Dwight Smith.

== Professional career ==
=== Toronto Blue Jays ===
Smith attended McIntosh High School and was drafted by the Blue Jays in the 1st round (53rd overall) of the 2011 Major League Baseball draft. Smith made his professional baseball debut in 2012 and split the season with the Rookie Bluefield Blue Jays and Low-A Vancouver Canadians, hitting a combined .212 with 4 home runs and 29 runs batted in (RBI). He spent the 2013 season with the Class-A Lansing Lugnuts, where he batted .284 in 109 games, with 7 home runs, 46 RBI, and 25 stolen bases.

Smith was promoted to the High-A Dunedin Blue Jays for the 2014 season. On April 6, 2014, he hit a pair of solo home runs against Cole Hamels, the first two home run game of his career. On August 26, the Blue Jays organization announced that Smith would play for the Mesa Solar Sox of the Arizona Fall League at the completion of the 2014 season. He finished the 2014 season having batted .284 in 121 games played, with 12 home runs and 60 RBI. He stole 15 bases, and posted an OPS over .800 for the first time in his career. On September 24, Smith was named the MVP for Dunedin in 2014. He was promoted to the Double-A New Hampshire Fisher Cats at the start of the 2015 season, and played the entire season there, batting .265 with 7 home runs and 44 RBI in 117 games played. Smith was not added to the Blue Jays 40-man roster at the end of the 2015 season, making him eligible for the Rule 5 draft. MLB.com columnist Jonathan Mayo named him one of the top available prospects heading into the draft.

Smith was invited to Major League spring training on January 12, 2016, and reassigned to minor league camp on March 7. He was assigned to New Hampshire to open the 2016 minor league season. Smith played 126 games for the Fisher Cats in 2016, and hit .265 with a career-high 15 home runs and 74 RBI. He was assigned to the Triple-A Buffalo Bisons to open the 2017 season.

On May 18, 2017, Smith was called up by the Blue Jays and made his debut the same day against the Atlanta Braves. He went 0–2 with a walk in Toronto's 9–0 win. He was optioned back to Triple-A Buffalo on May 20 and recalled on May 24 after Anthony Alford was placed on the disabled list. Smith recorded the first hit of his career in the Blue Jays 8–4 win over the Milwaukee Brewers that day, and was optioned back to Buffalo following the game. He was recalled on September 4.

On March 5, 2019, Smith was designated for assignment.

=== Baltimore Orioles ===
On March 9, 2019, Smith was traded to the Baltimore Orioles in exchange for international pool money. He began the season as the starting left fielder. On May 31, Smith hit his first career grand slam off Drew Pomeranz as the Orioles won 9–6 over the San Francisco Giants. Smith's season was cut short due to injury, playing in just 101 games. He finished hitting .241 with 13 home runs and 53 runs batted in.

In 2020, Smith appeared in 21 games and hit .222/.306/.365 with six runs batted in over 72 plate appearances. He was designated for assignment on August 22, 2020, and became a free agent on November 2.

=== Cincinnati Reds ===
On December 7, 2020, Smith signed a minor league contract with the Cincinnati Reds organization. He was assigned to the Triple-A Louisville Bats to begin the 2021 season. In 36 games for Louisville, Smith slashed .220/.327/.283 with 1 home run and 17 RBI before being released on June 20, 2021.

=== Acereros de Monclova ===
On July 9, 2021, Smith signed with the Acereros de Monclova of the Mexican League. He made 22 appearances for Monclova, hitting .294/.362/.506 with five home runs, 14 RBI, and two stolen bases.

=== Chicago White Sox ===
Smith signed a minor league contract with the Chicago White Sox on February 22, 2022. He made 14 appearances for the Triple-A Charlotte Knights, slashing .236/.300/.327 with one home run and five RBI. Smith was released by the White Sox organization on May 7.

=== Acereros de Monclova (second stint) ===
On May 25, 2022, Smith re-signed with the Acereros de Monclova of the Mexican League. He made six appearances for the Acereros, going 3-for-17 (.177) with no home runs or RBI. Smith was released by Monclova on June 4.

=== Lexington Legends ===
On June 12, 2022, Smith signed with the Lexington Legends of the Atlantic League of Professional Baseball. Smith played in 12 games for Lexington, hitting .171/.292/.366 with two home runs and seven RBI. He became a free agent after the season.

=== Charleston Dirty Birds ===
On April 13, 2023, Smith signed with the Charleston Dirty Birds of the Atlantic League of Professional Baseball. In 120 games for Charleston, he batted .331/.426/.569 with 22 home runs, 64 RBI, and 24 stolen bases. Following the season, Smith was named an Atlantic League All–Star.

=== Charros de Jalisco ===
On February 19, 2024, Smith signed with the Charros de Jalisco of the Mexican League. In 79 appearances for Jalisco, he batted .302/.413/.502 with 11 home runs, 41 RBI, and 10 stolen bases.

Smith made 78 appearances for the Charros during the 2025 campaign, batting .273/.423/.478 with 10 home runs, 49 RBI, and five stolen bases.

=== Conspiradores de Querétaro ===
On January 26, 2026, Smith was traded to the Conspiradores de Querétaro of the Mexican League. In 58 appearances for Querétaro, he slashed .344/.436/.539 with six home runs and 24 RBI.

=== Charros de Jalisco (second stint) ===
On July 17, 2026, Smith was traded to the Charros de Jalisco of the Mexican League in exchange for P Juan Robles. In 18 appearances for Jalisco, he batted .276/.373/.483 with two home runs and five RBI.

=== El Águila de Veracruz ===
On September 24, 2026, Smith was traded to El Águila de Veracruz of the Mexican League.
