= Pineland, South Carolina =

- Unincorporated community
- Location within South Carolina Location within the United States
- Coordinates: 32°36′01″N 81°09′34″W
- Country: United States
- State: South Carolina
- County: Jasper
- Elevation: 69 ft (21 m)
- Time zone: UTC-5 (Eastern (EST))
  - Summer (DST): UTC-4 (EDT)
- ZIP code: 29934
- Area codes: 843 & 854
- GNIS feature ID: 1231661

Pineland is an unincorporated community in Jasper County, South Carolina, United States. The community is located at the intersection of U.S. Route 601 and South Carolina Highway 652, 5.8 miles (9.3 km) south of Furman. Pineland has a post office with ZIP code 29934, which opened on May 10, 1901.
