= Yemassee, South Carolina =

- Town
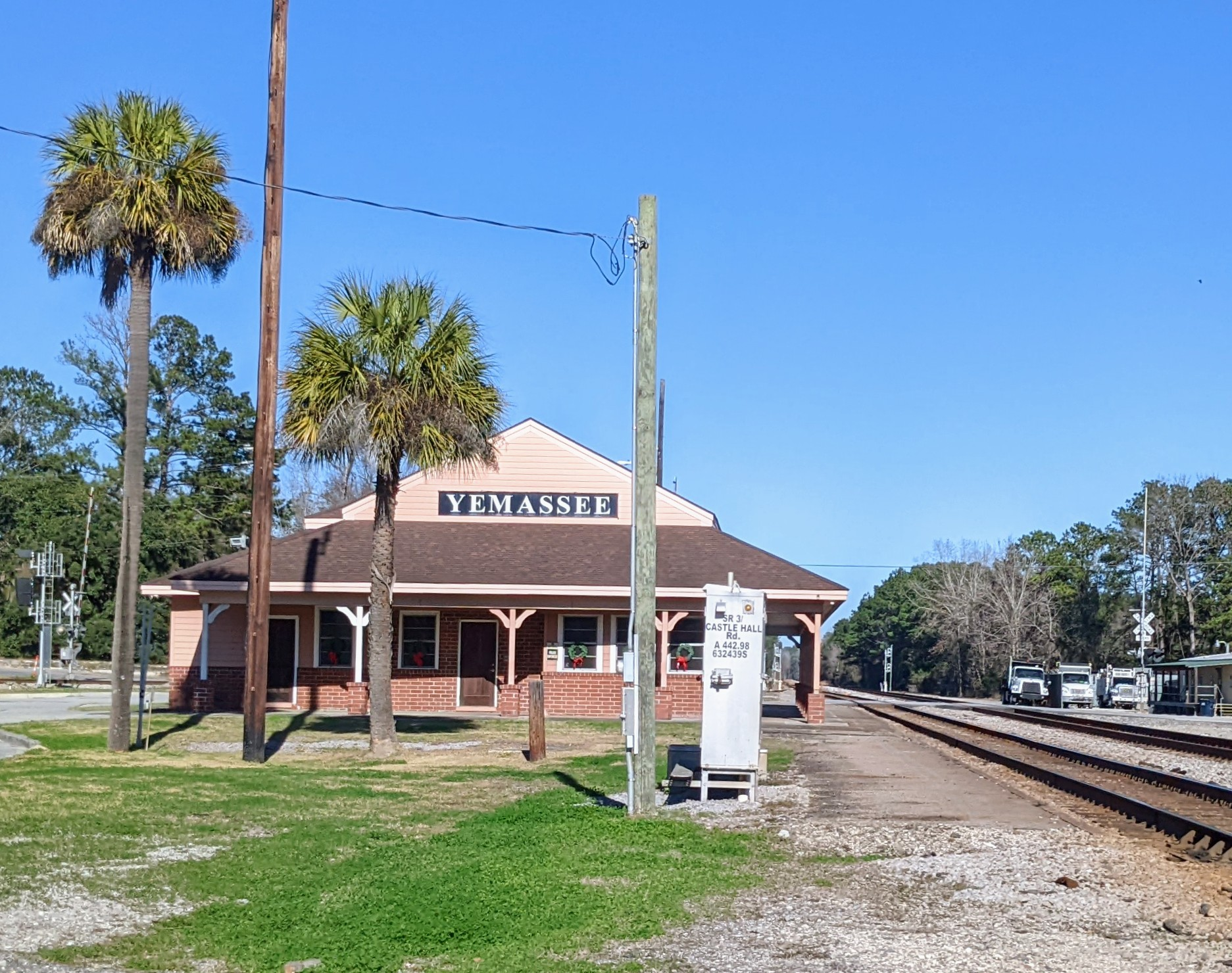
- Yemassee railway station

- Seal
- Motto: "The focal point of the four counties"
- Location within South Carolina Location within the United States
- Coordinates: 32°40′20″N 80°51′18″W
- Country: United States
- State: South Carolina
- Counties: Hampton, Beaufort

Government
  - Type: Town Council

Area
  - Total: 8.12 sq mi (21.02 km^{2})
  - Land: 8.10 sq mi (20.99 km^{2})
  - Water: 0.0077 sq mi (0.02 km^{2})
- Elevation: 13 ft (4.0 m)

Population (2020)
  - Total: 1,080
  - Density: 133.2/sq mi (51.44/km^{2})
- Time zone: UTC-5 (Eastern (EST))
  - Summer (DST): UTC-4 (EDT)
- ZIP code: 29945
- Area codes: 843, 854
- FIPS code: 45-79450
- GNIS feature ID: 2406926
- Website: www.townofyemassee.org

Yemassee (/ˈjɛməsiː/) is a town in Hampton and Beaufort counties in the U.S. state of South Carolina. The population was 1,080 at the 2020 census. Located in the South Carolina Lowcountry, Yemassee is divided by the county line between Hampton and Beaufort counties along the roadbed of the CSX railroad. Most of the town's population lies within Hampton County.

Yemassee hosts one of the few commercial breeding facilities of non-human primates in the entire United States, Alpha Genesis, which serves as a major employer for the town. The Frank Lloyd Wright-designed Auldbrass Plantation house and outbuildings lie just outside the town limits of Yemassee. The town is 44 miles (71 km) north of Savannah, Georgia, and 54 miles (87 km) west of Charleston, South Carolina.

== History ==
The town takes its name from the Native American tribe of the same name, the Yamasee, which was the most important Indian ally of South Carolina until the Yamasee War of 1715. The first attack that began the Yamasee War occurred in the Yamasee town of Pocotaligo, today part of the town of Yemassee.

The site of the present town is surrounded by both Revolutionary and Civil War sites. The remains of Civil War field fortifications can be observed along U.S. 21 and 17A between Yemassee and Pocotaligo (that section of highway is now a part of Yemassee, as the town has now greatly expanded into Beaufort County. Within the town limits are three historical plantations including Bindon, Cotton Hall, and Tomotley, with the latter two annexed into the town in 2021.

William Gilmore Simms published the novel The Yemassee: A Romance of Carolina in the 19th century, and the University of South Carolina in Columbia publishes a literary journal titled Yemassee.

The Yemassee Train Depot was the final stop for Marine Corps Recruits to Parris Island for much of the 19th and 20th centuries.

== Geography ==
According to the United States Census Bureau, the town has a total area of 4.5 square miles (11.7 km^{2}), all land.

=== Climate ===
Climate data for Yemassee, South Carolina (1991–2020 normals, extremes 1899–present)
Month	Jan	Feb	Mar	Apr	May	Jun	Jul	Aug	Sep	Oct	Nov	Dec	Year
Record high °F (°C)	85 (29)	88 (31)	92 (33)	99 (37)	102 (39)	108 (42)	110 (43)	109 (43)	107 (42)	97 (36)	91 (33)	87 (31)	110 (43)
Mean maximum °F (°C)	76.8 (24.9)	80.5 (26.9)	85.6 (29.8)	89.1 (31.7)	95.3 (35.2)	98.4 (36.9)	100.0 (37.8)	98.8 (37.1)	95.1 (35.1)	88.9 (31.6)	84.0 (28.9)	78.3 (25.7)	101.5 (38.6)
Mean daily maximum °F (°C)	59.2 (15.1)	63.5 (17.5)	69.5 (20.8)	76.5 (24.7)	83.4 (28.6)	87.6 (30.9)	90.1 (32.3)	88.5 (31.4)	83.8 (28.8)	76.3 (24.6)	67.8 (19.9)	61.2 (16.2)	75.6 (24.2)
Daily mean °F (°C)	47.7 (8.7)	51.3 (10.7)	56.8 (13.8)	63.8 (17.7)	71.2 (21.8)	77.2 (25.1)	80.1 (26.7)	79.0 (26.1)	74.1 (23.4)	64.9 (18.3)	55.7 (13.2)	49.7 (9.8)	64.3 (17.9)
Mean daily minimum °F (°C)	36.2 (2.3)	39.1 (3.9)	44.2 (6.8)	51.1 (10.6)	59.0 (15.0)	66.9 (19.4)	70.0 (21.1)	69.5 (20.8)	64.4 (18.0)	53.5 (11.9)	43.7 (6.5)	38.3 (3.5)	53.0 (11.7)
Mean minimum °F (°C)	17.3 (−8.2)	20.7 (−6.3)	24.6 (−4.1)	33.0 (0.6)	43.0 (6.1)	54.7 (12.6)	61.5 (16.4)	59.6 (15.3)	50.3 (10.2)	33.6 (0.9)	24.6 (−4.1)	20.7 (−6.3)	15.1 (−9.4)
Record low °F (°C)	0 (−18)	4 (−16)	13 (−11)	24 (−4)	33 (1)	45 (7)	56 (13)	49 (9)	38 (3)	20 (−7)	10 (−12)	10 (−12)	0 (−18)
Average precipitation inches (mm)	3.92 (100)	3.72 (94)	3.70 (94)	3.56 (90)	3.48 (88)	6.67 (169)	6.38 (162)	5.51 (140)	6.04 (153)	4.09 (104)	2.75 (70)	3.78 (96)	53.60 (1,361)
Average precipitation days	9.6	8.9	7.9	7.6	8.6	12.9	12.6	12.0	10.1	7.8	8.0	9.5	115.5
Source: NOAA

== Demographics ==
Historical population
Census	Pop.	Note	%±
1910	250		—
1920	323		29.2%
1930	539		66.9%
1940	684		26.9%
1950	712		4.1%
1960	473		−33.6%
1970	745		57.5%
1980	789		5.9%
1990	728		−7.7%
2000	807		10.9%
2010	1,027		27.3%
2020	1,080		5.2%
U.S. Decennial Census

=== Racial and ethnic composition ===
Yemassee town, South Carolina – Racial and ethnic composition Note: the US Census treats Hispanic/Latino as an ethnic category. This table excludes Latinos from the racial categories and assigns them to a separate category. Hispanics/Latinos may be of any race.
Race / Ethnicity (NH = Non-Hispanic)	Pop 2000	Pop 2010	Pop 2020	% 2000	% 2010	% 2020
White alone (NH)	342	418	385	42.38%	40.70%	35.65%
Black or African American alone (NH)	447	549	630	55.39%	53.46%	58.33%
Native American or Alaska Native alone (NH)	0	5	5	0.00%	0.49%	0.46%
Asian alone (NH)	5	14	1	0.62%	1.36%	0.09%
Native Hawaiian or Pacific Islander alone (NH)	0	1	0	0.00%	0.10%	0.00%
Other race alone (NH)	0	0	6	0.00%	0.00%	0.56%
Mixed race or Multiracial (NH)	6	15	32	0.74%	1.46%	2.96%
Hispanic or Latino (any race)	7	25	21	0.87%	2.43%	1.94%
Total	807	1,027	1,080	100.00%	100.00%	100.00%

=== 2020 census ===
As of the 2020 United States census, there were 1,080 people, 390 households, and 230 families residing in the town.

=== 2000 census ===
As of the census of 2000, there were 807 people, 323 households, and 208 families residing in the town. The population density was 179.7 inhabitants per square mile (69.4/km^{2}). There were 378 housing units at an average density of 84.2 units per square mile (32.5 units/km^{2}). The racial makeup of the town was 55.39% African American, 43.25% White, 0.62% Asian, and 0.74% from two or more races. Hispanic or Latino of any race were 0.87% of the population.

There were 323 households, out of which 34.1% had children under the age of 18 living with them, 35.3% were married couples living together, 24.8% had a female householder with no husband present, and 35.3% were non-families. 31.6% of all households were made up of individuals, and 17.3% had someone living alone who was 65 years of age or older. The average household size was 2.46 and the average family size was 3.12.

In the town, the population was spread out, with 31.0% under the age of 18, 8.2% from 18 to 24, 26.0% from 25 to 44, 17.3% from 45 to 64, and 17.5% who were 65 years of age or older. The median age was 33 years. For every 100 females, there were 80.5 males. For every 100 females age 18 and over, there were 73.0 males.

The median income for a household in the town was $24,868, and the median income for a family was $31,429. Males had a median income of $31,944 versus $19,375 for females. The per capita income for the town was $14,186. About 22.2% of families and 22.9% of the population were below the poverty line, including 24.7% of those under age 18 and 20.3% of those age 65 or over.

== Transportation ==
Yemassee is accessible from three exits along Interstate 95 (exits 33, 38 and 42), which runs to the west of the town limits. Alternate U.S. Highway 17 and U.S. Highway 21 run through the town. S.C. Highway 68 connects Yemassee with other communities in Hampton County, including Varnville and Hampton. The town is also home to an Amtrak station, which serves as the principal rail access point for the Lowcountry region.

== Notable people ==
- Chief Bey, African drummer
- Frank Blair, NBC television journalist
