= South Carolina Highway 68 =

State highway in South Carolina, United States

South Carolina Highway 68
- Yemassee Highway

Route information
- Maintained by SCDOT
- Length: 15.330 mi (24.671 km)
- Existed: 1967–present

Major junctions
- West end: US 278 in Almeda
- I-95 in Yemassee
- East end: US 17 Alt. / US 21 in Yemassee

Location
- Country: United States
- State: South Carolina
- Counties: Hampton

Highway system
- South Carolina State Highway System; Interstate; US; State; Scenic
← SC 67	→ SC 70

South Carolina Highway 68 (SC 68) is a 15.330-mile (24.671 km) state highway in Hampton County, in the U.S. state of South Carolina. It connects the Hampton–Varnille area with Yemassee and Interstate 95 (I-95).

== Route description ==
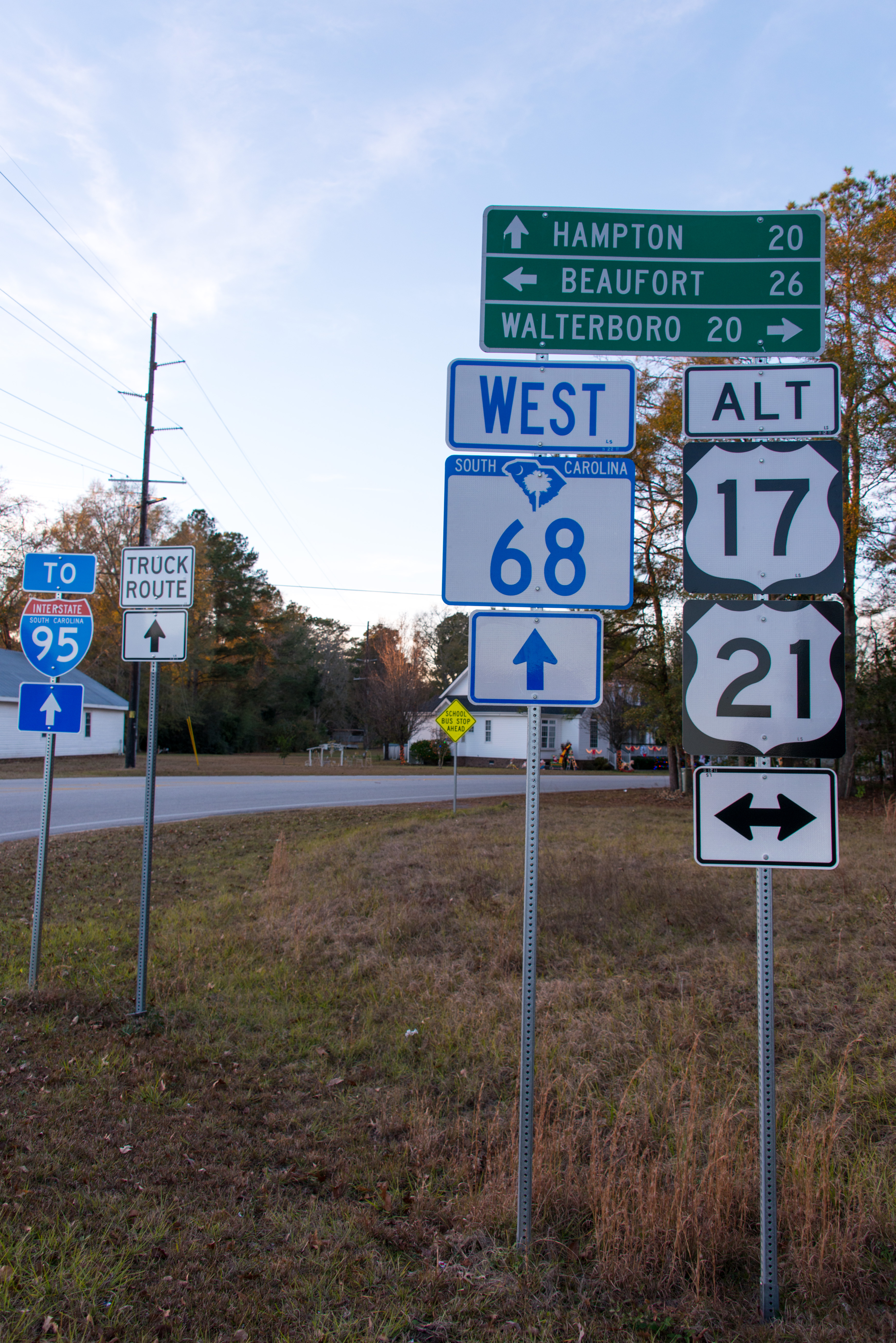
Beginning of West SC 68 in Yemassee

The route of SC 68 travels generally in a northwest to southeast direction, beginning at a junction with U.S. Highway 278 (US 278 just south of Varnville. The highway travels in a nearly straight line for its entire length, paralleling the Port Royal and Augusta Railway (today the CSX Augusta Subdivision). The roadway passes through the small hamlet of Early Branch before widening to a four-lane configuration about one mile (1.6 km) north of the I-95 junction. Passing underneath I-95, SC 68 returns to a two-lane configuration as it enters Yemassee before terminating at an intersection with US 17 Alternate and US 21.

== History ==
Established in 1967 as a renumbering of SC 28, it has remained unchanged since.

Prior to the current routing, SC 68 had two previous incarnations:

From 1934 or 1935 to 1938 from near Clio to the North Carolina state line (renumbered as SC 83)

From 1938 to 1947 as a short highway spur from SC 6 in Denmark to Voorhees College.

== Junction list ==
The entire route is in Hampton County.

Location	mi	km	Destinations	Notes
Almeda	0.000	0.000	US 278 (Yemassee Highway / Grays Highway) – Varnville, Allendale, Ridgeland, Savannah	Western terminus
Yemassee	13.650	21.968	I-95 – Florence, Savannah	I-95 exit 38
Yemassee	15.330	24.671	US 17 Alt. / US 21 / Flowers Street south (US 17 Conn. south) – Beaufort, Walterboro	Eastern terminus of SC 68; northern terminus of US 17 Conn. and Flowers Street
1.000 mi = 1.609 km; 1.000 km = 0.621 mi
