= First Baptist Church (Wilmington, North Carolina) =

Baptist church in Wilmington, North Carolina

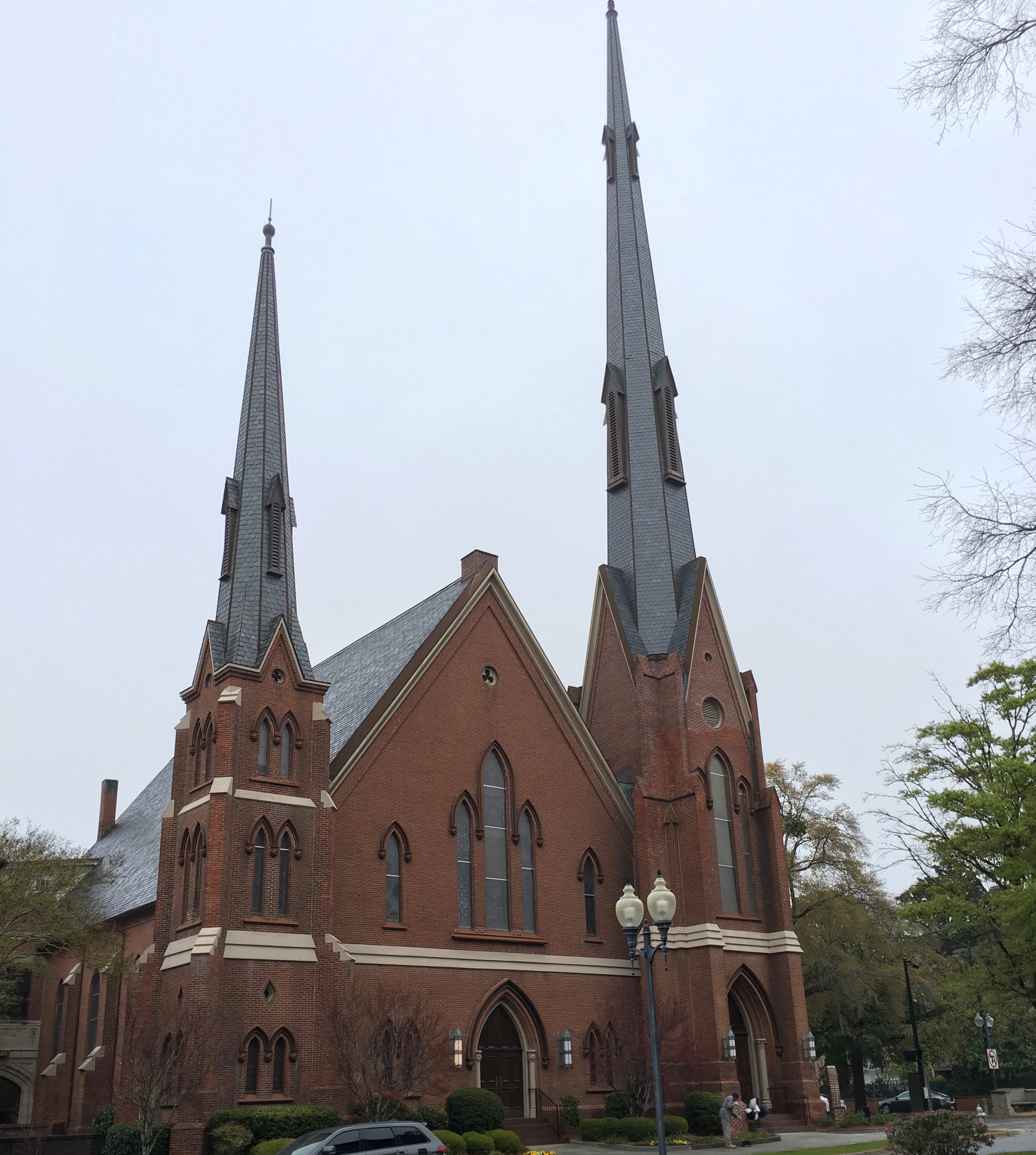
- Southern Facade of the First Baptist Church, Wilmington, North Carolina

Religion
- Affiliation: Cooperative Baptist Fellowship
- District: Cooperative Baptist Fellowship of North Carolina
- Status: Active

Location
- Location: City of Wilmington; North Carolina; United States of America
- State: North Carolina
- Interactive map of First Baptist Church
- Coordinates: 34.2357709°N 77.9438138°W

Architecture
- Completed: 1808

First Baptist Church is a historic Baptist church in the historic district of Wilmington, North Carolina. The church is part of the Cooperative Baptist Fellowship.

== History ==
The church was founded in 1808.

== Gallery ==
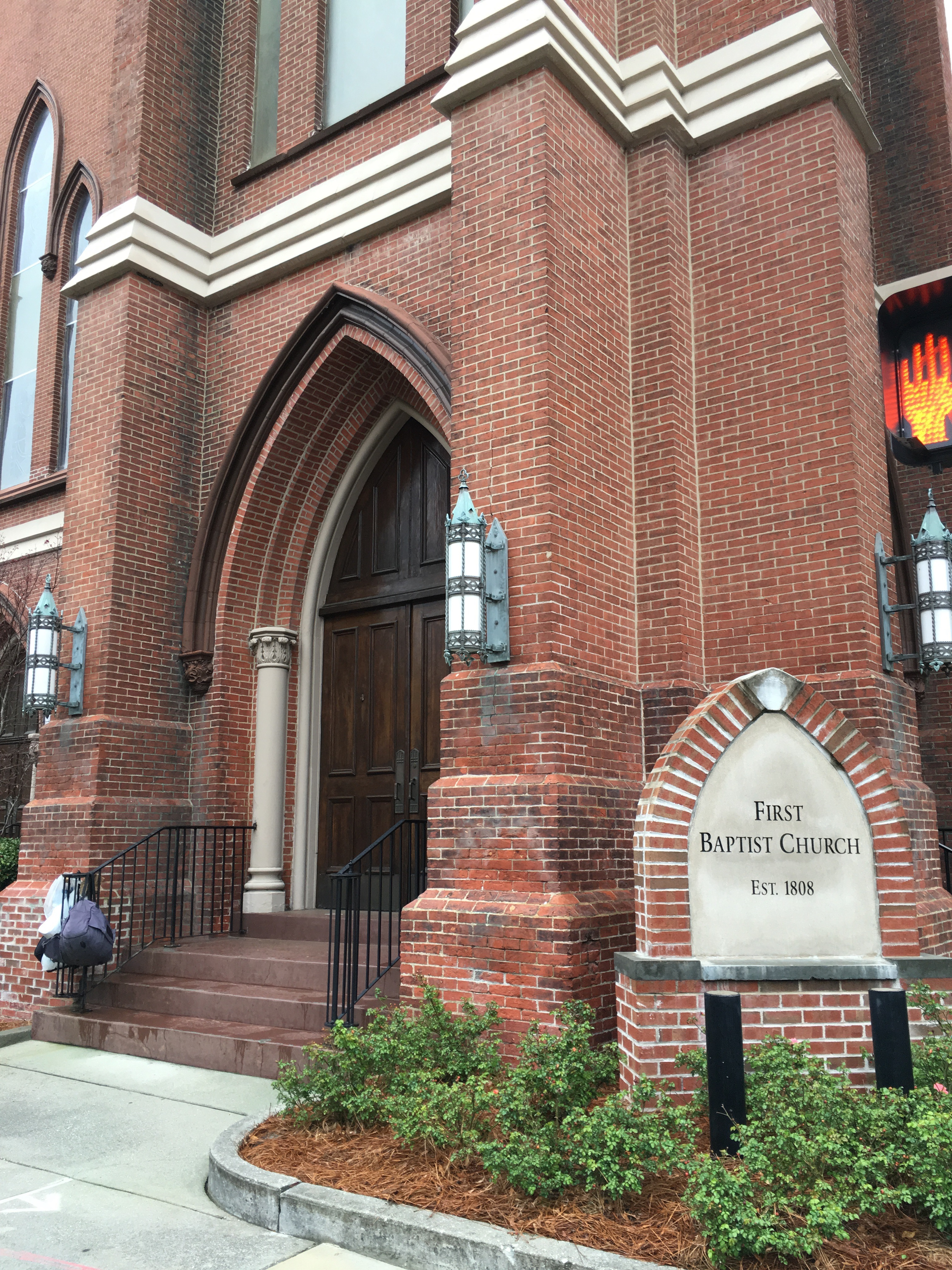
First Baptist Church Wilmington NC Market Street Stairs Entrance

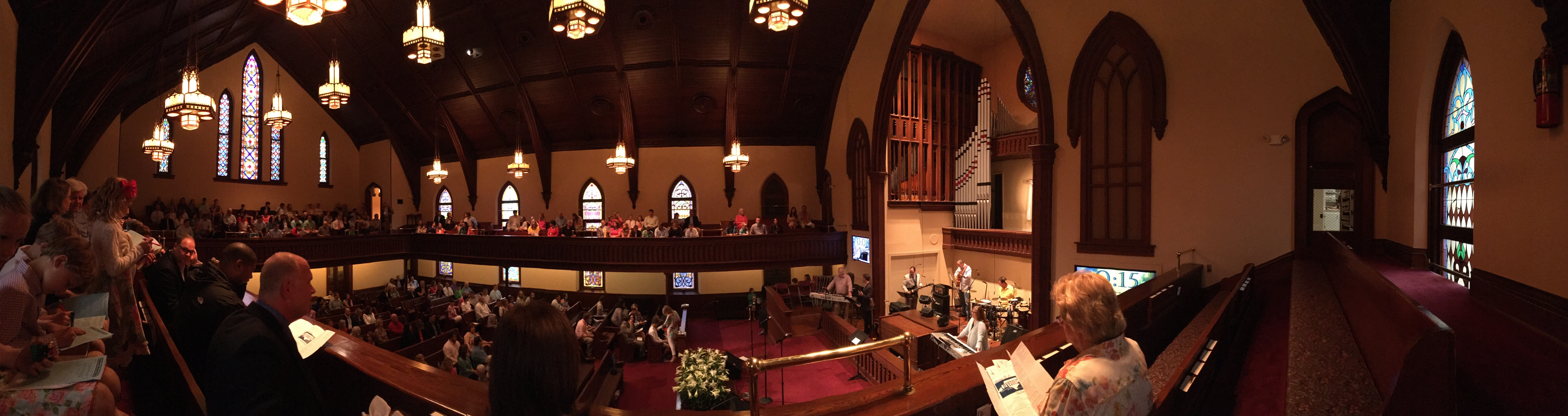
Panoramic sweep of the interior of the First Baptist Church of Wilmington, North Carolina.

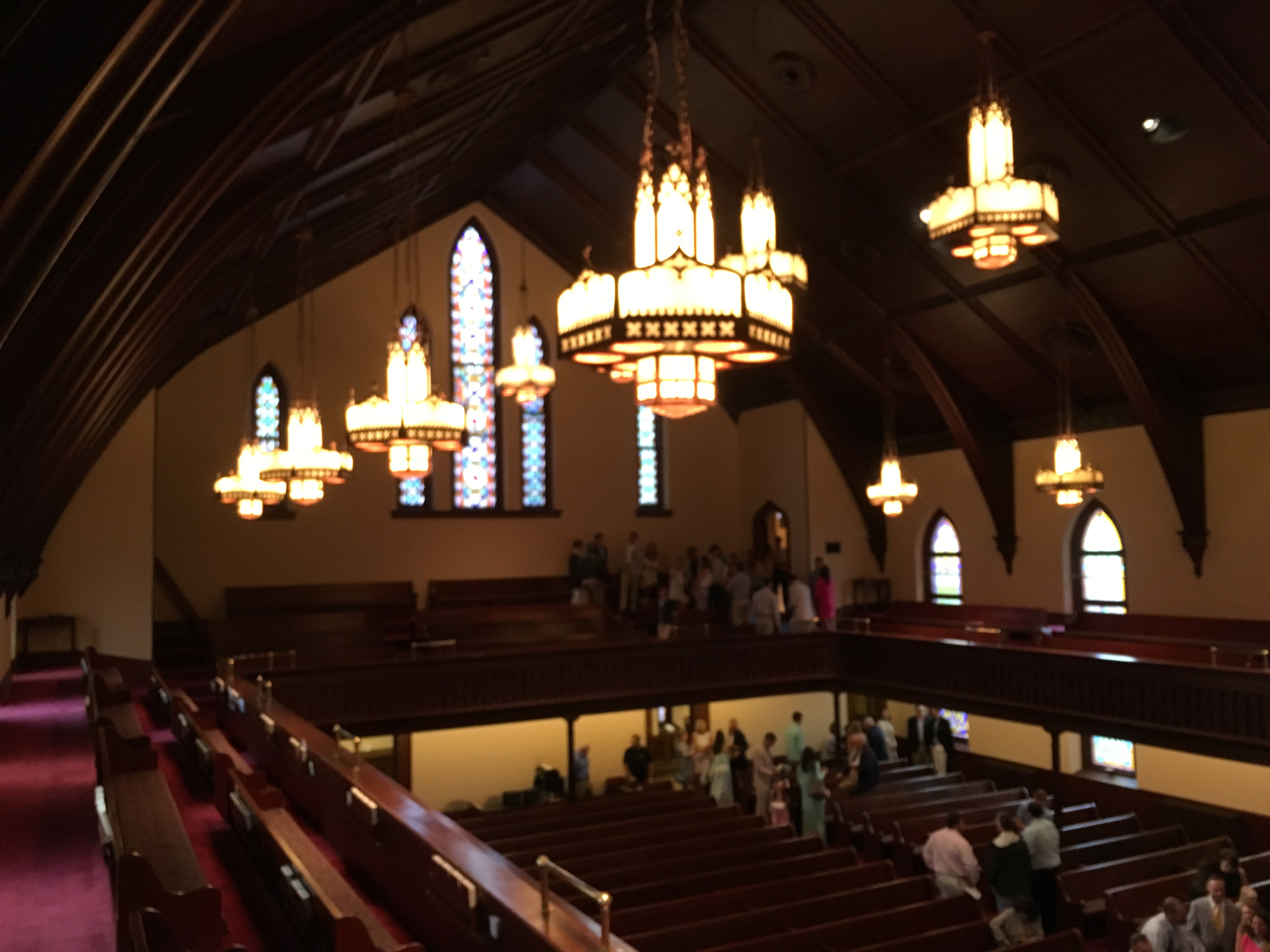
First Baptist Church Wilmington Interior facing Narthex from Balcony

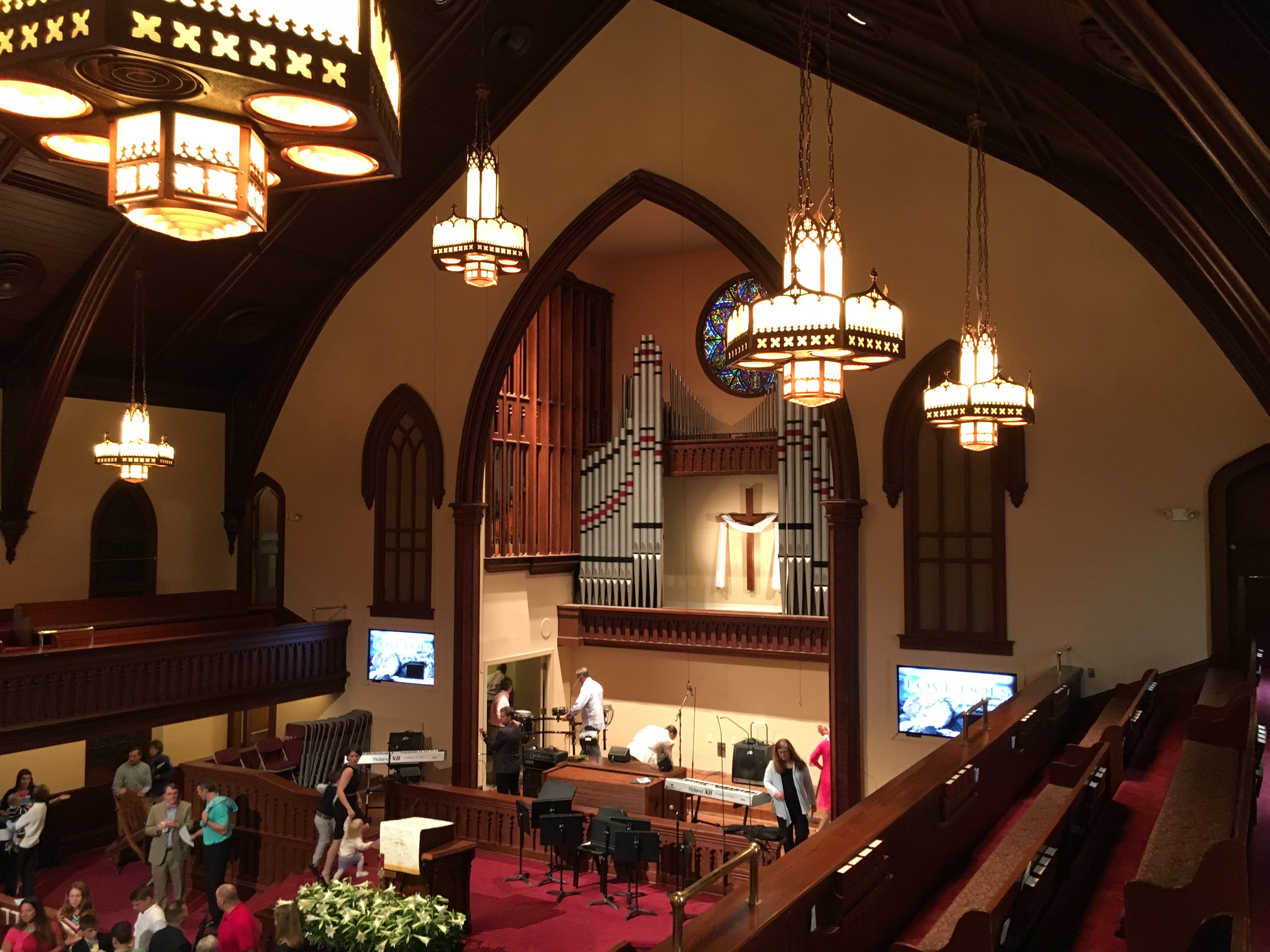
First Baptist Church Wilmington Interior facing Altar from Balcony, showing Lighting
