= South Carolina Highway 165 =

State highway in South Carolina

South Carolina Highway 165

Route information
- Maintained by SCDOT
- Length: 28.393 mi (45.694 km)
- Existed: 1939–present
- Tourist routes: South Carolina Heritage Corridor: Discovery Route

Major junctions
- South end: Dead end in Yonges Island
- US 17 in Ravenel; US 78 in Summerville
- North end: US 17 Alt. in Summerville

Location
- Country: United States
- State: South Carolina
- Counties: Charleston, Dorchester, Berkeley

Highway system
- South Carolina State Highway System; Interstate; US; State; Scenic
← SC 164	→ SC 170

South Carolina Highway 165 (SC 165) is a 28.393-mile (45.694 km) state highway in the U.S. state of South Carolina. It connects Yonges Island to U.S. Route 17 (US 17) in Ravenel and US 17 Alternate in Summerville.

== Route description ==
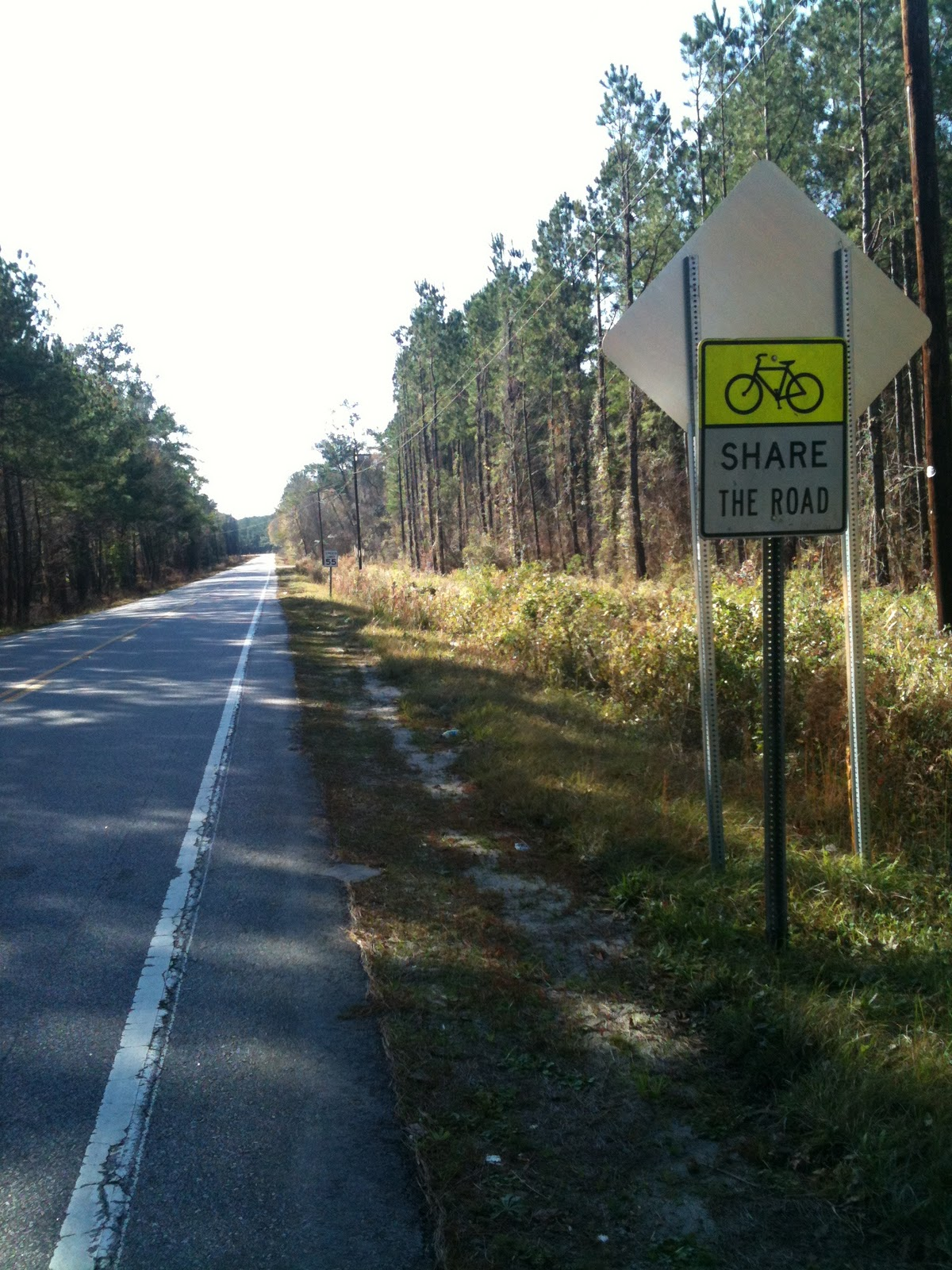
A rural section of SC 165

SC 165 begins at the entrance to Stevens Towing Co., Inc. along the banks of the Wadmalaw River on Yonges Island. It heads west-southwest before curving to the northwest. In Meggett, it passes the city hall before it intersects SC 162 in Hollywood. In Ravenel, it crosses over a CSX Transportation railway and intersects US 17 (Savannah Highway). After leaving Ravenel, the highway becomes a very rural route. It stays this way until it intersects SC 61 (Ashley River Road) just southwest of Summerville. It then transitions to a congested urban highway from that intersection until its northern terminus. A short distance later, it intersects SC 642 (Dorchester Road). It follows the Berlin G. Myers Parkway for the rest of its route. In Summerville, it intersects US 78 (East 5th North Street), before it curves to the northwest to meet its northern terminus, and intersection with US 17 Alternate (N. Main Street) and Berkeley Circle.

== History ==
Established in 1939 as a new primary highway, SC 165 originally traversed 7.1 miles (11.4 km) from its current southern terminus to US 17 in Ravenel. This section has remained relatively unchanged; with an exception in Hollywood, where it was realigned in the 1980s, removing a concurrency with SC 162 and leaving Town Council Road.

Around 1952, SC 165 was extended north on mostly new construction to Cooks Crossroads, where it then replaced SC 61 going north into Summerville. Entering the city from the southeast, it had a concurrency with US 17 Alternate for 1.1 miles (1.8 km), before taking a left onto Richardson Avenue. Going northwest out of Summerville, it ended at US 78 in an area originally known as Brownsville. In 2000, SC 165 was removed from downtown Summerville, and was rerouted onto Berlin G. Myers Parkway and went northeast to its current northern terminus at US 17 Alternate.

== Future ==
Dorchester County currently has plans to add additional lanes to SC 165 from SC 61 (Ashley River Road) to Berlin G. Myers Parkway.

== Major intersections ==
County	Location	mi	km	Destinations	Notes
Charleston	Yonges Island	0.000	0.000	Dead end	Southern terminus
Charleston	Hollywood	3.900	6.276	SC 162 – Adams Run	
Charleston	Ravenel	7.170	11.539	US 17 (Savannah Highway) – Walterboro, Charleston	
Dorchester		21.523	34.638	SC 61 (Ashley River Road) – Charleston, Walterboro	
Dorchester		21.723	34.960	Cook's Cross Road south (SC 61 Conn. south)	Northern terminus of SC 61 Conn. and Cook's Cross Road
Dorchester		22.983	36.988	SC 642 (Dorchester Road / US 17 Alt. Truck south) – Walterboro, Charleston A.F.B.	Southern end of US 17 Alt. Truck concurrency
Dorchester	Summerville	27.543	44.326	US 78 (East 5th North Street) – St. George, Charleston	
Berkeley	Summerville	28.393	45.694	US 17 Alt. (North Main Street) to I-26 / Berkeley Circle north – Walterboro, Moncks Corner	Northern end of US 17 Alt. Truck concurrency; northern terminus of US 17 Alt. Truck and SC 165; roadway continues as Berkeley Circle.
1.000 mi = 1.609 km; 1.000 km = 0.621 mi: Concurrency terminus
