= Morgan Island, South Carolina =

Island off coast of South Carolina, United States

Morgan Island
Nickname: Monkey Island
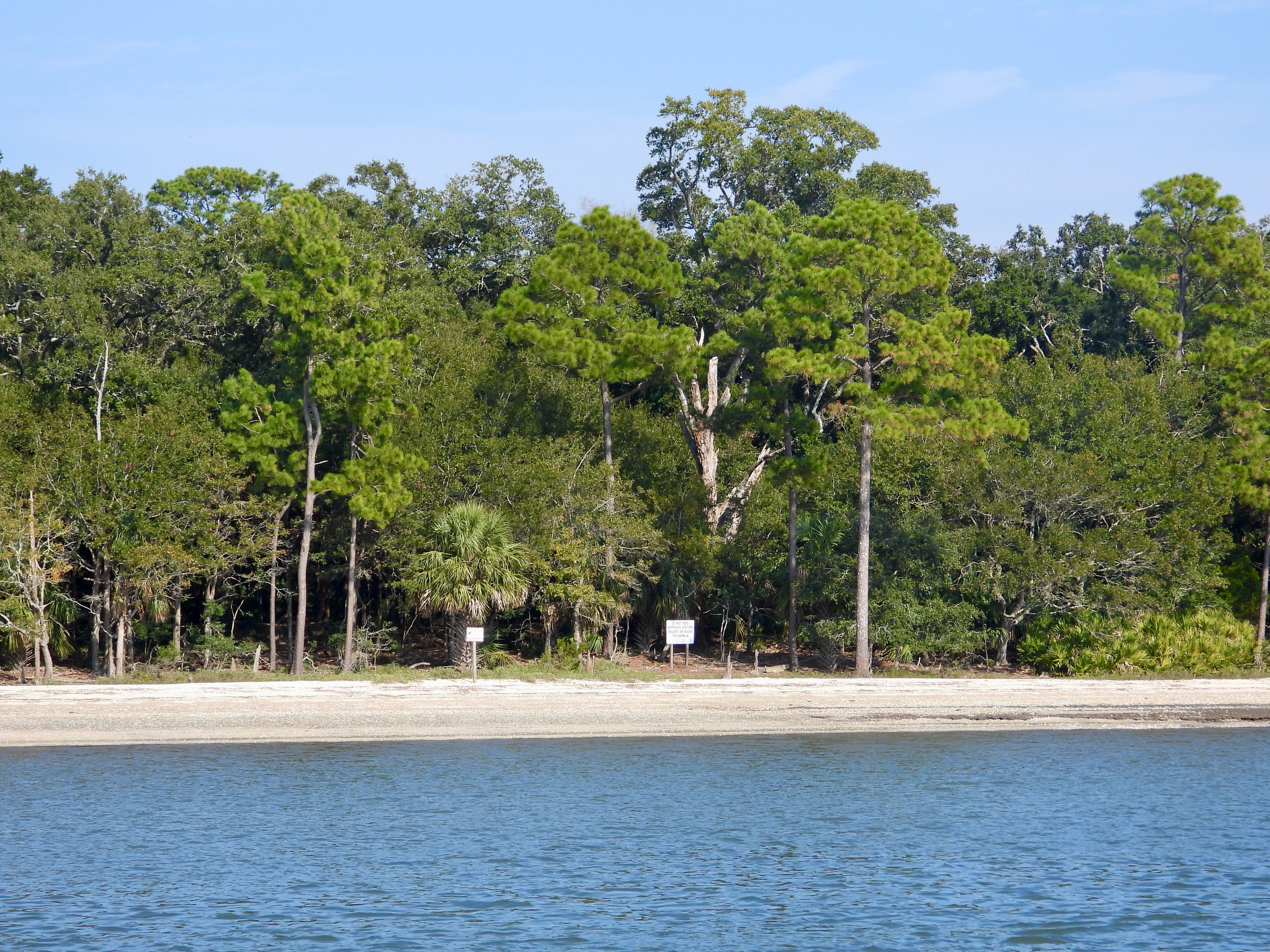
- Beach on the south side of Morgan Island

- Location within South Carolina

Geography
- Location: Atlantic Ocean
- Coordinates: 32.4652°N 80.5194°W
- Archipelago: Sea Islands
- Area: 1,816.63 ha (4,489.0 acres)

Administration
- United States
- State: South Carolina
- County: Beaufort

Demographics
- Population: 0 (about 4000 rhesus monkeys)

Morgan Island is one of the Sea Islands, located in Beaufort County, South Carolina, just north of Beaufort. It is also known as Monkey Island due to its colony of free-ranging rhesus monkeys, established in 1979.

== Geography ==
Morgan Island is a 4,489-acre (1,817-hectare) marshland island that consists of 635 acres (257 ha) of upland. The island is located between the Morgan and Coosaw rivers and borders the Saint Helena Sound to the south and Parrot Creek to the north. The marshland area includes three major tidal creeks as well as other small creeks. Morgan Island is uninhabited, and is home to a breeding colony of approximately 3,500 free-ranging, Indian-origin rhesus monkeys. There is a 370-acre (150 ha) portion of upland that supports a semi-tropical maritime forest where the monkey colony primarily resides.

The colony on Morgan Island is one of only two rhesus monkey colonies in the continental United States, the other being on the Silver River in Florida.

== Monkey colony ==
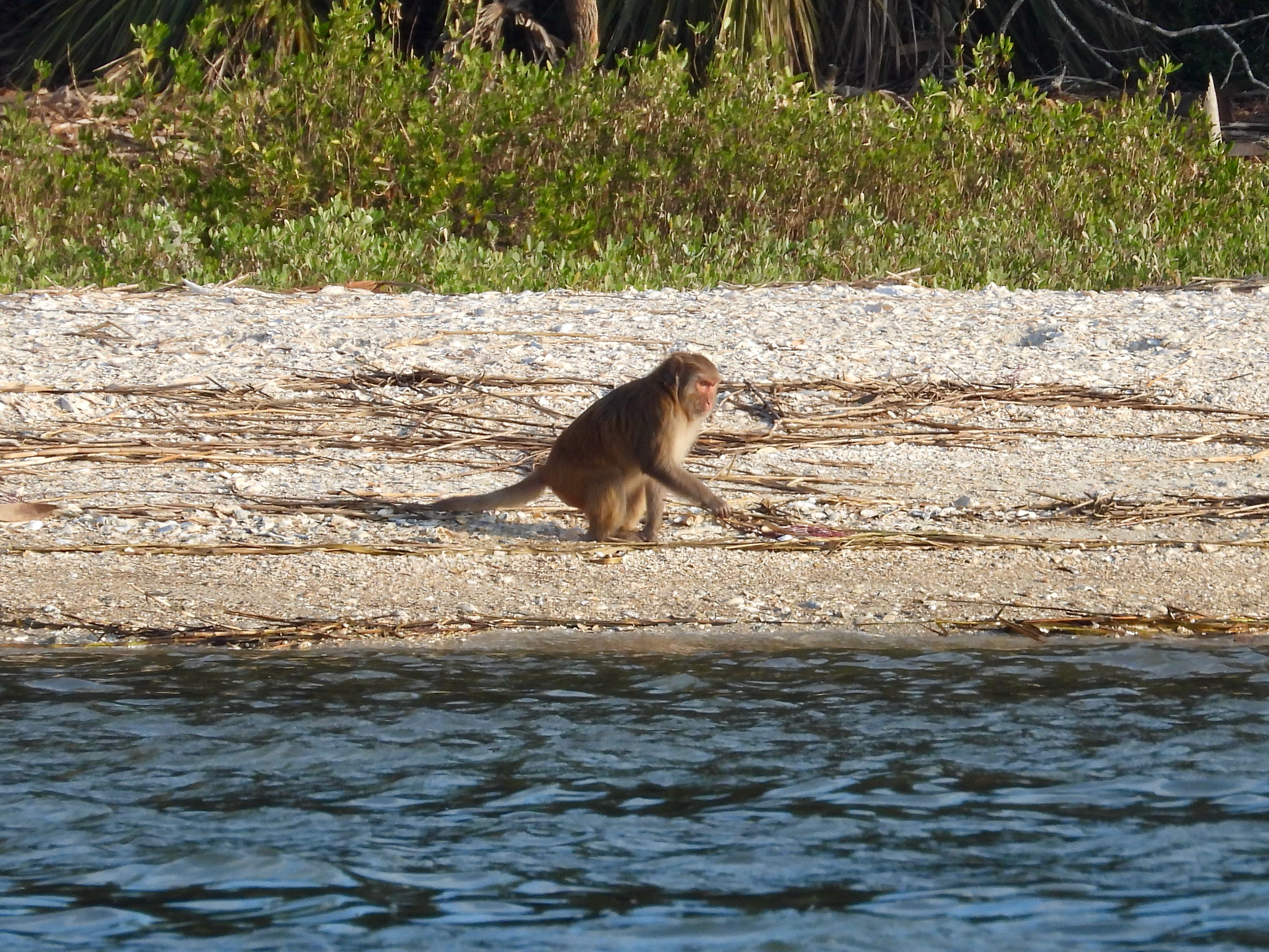
A rhesus macaque on a beach on the south side of the island

Historically, the island has been uninhabited due to its location and distance from the mainland. Originally, the monkey colony now located on Morgan Island was located at the Caribbean Primate Research Center in La Parguera, Puerto Rico. According to the Centers for Disease Control and Prevention (CDC), there were incidents of the free-ranging monkeys escaping, carrying viral herpes B infections, which lead to outbreaks in the local population. Puerto Rico was alarmed by this, and South Carolina stepped in to offer an uninhabited island for research. In 1979 and 1980, over 1,400 animals were relocated to Morgan Island.

The island is owned by the South Carolina Department of Natural Resources (SCDNR). The monkeys that live on the island are owned by the National Institute of Allergy and Infectious Diseases (NIAID), and used for public health research. Alpha Genesis, a primate-breeding facility based on Morgan Island, is under contract with the NIH. In September 2025, a Congressional committee pressed federal health officials to scientifically justify the continued breeding of primates on the island. Congressmember Nancy Mace, whose district includes Morgan Island, has called for an end to taxpayer-funded primate experiments and recommended that the island be shut down.

== Conservation ==
Morgan Island lies within the ACE Basin National Estuarine Research Reserve, under the National Estuarine Research Reserve system (NERR).
