= Hampton County High School =

Location
- 115 Airport Road; Varnville, Hampton County, South Carolina 29944; United States
- Coordinates: 32.8589°N 81.0890°W

Information
- Type: Public high school
- Founded: 2023 (as a consolidation of Wade Hampton High School and Estill High School)
- Oversight: Hampton County School District
- Superintendent: Dr. Glenda Sheffield
- Principal: Cassandra Williams
- Teaching staff: 34.87 (FTE)
- Grades: 9–12
- Enrollment: 617 (2024–2025)
- Student to teacher ratio: 17.69
- Campus type: Rural
- Colors: Royal Blue and white
- Mascot: Hampton County Hurricane
- Communities served: Hampton, Varnville
- Feeder schools: Estill Middle; North District Middle; Ben Hazel Primary; Brunson Elementary; Fennell Elementary; Estill Elementary; Hampton Elementary; Varnville Elementary
- Website: hchs.hcsdsc.org

Hampton County High School is a public high school within Hampton County School District, located between the towns of Hampton and Varnville, South Carolina, United States. The high school serves students in those communities in addition to students living in rural areas of northern and eastern Hampton County. The school served 719 students in the 2011–2012 school year. In August 2023, we have seen a significant change in the education scene of Hampton County. The well-known Wade Hampton High School has undergone a name change. This alteration is due to a merger with the neighboring Estill High School, leading to the formation of the new Hampton County High School. This establishment now has the unique distinction of being the sole public high school serving the community within Hampton County.

Hampton County High School was founded in 2023 as a consolidation of Wade Hampton High School in Varnville and Estill High School in Estill.

== Academics ==
In 2012, the average student-teacher ratio in core subjects was 24.9 students for every 1 teacher. Wade Hampton High School is accredited with the Southern Association of Colleges and Schools (SACS).

== Athletics ==
Wade Hampton competes at the Class AAA level in the South Carolina High School League. The school fields teams for boys in football, basketball, cross country, track & field, tennis, and golf; and for girls in cheerleading, volleyball, basketball, cross country, track & field, tennis, and golf. Wade Hampton has historic Class AA rivalries with Bamberg-Earhardt High School, Silver Bluff High School, and Barnwell High School. The school's main proximity rivalries were Estill High School and Allendale-Fairfax High School, both of which compete in Class A and AA respectively. Starting in the 2016–2017 academic year, the school moved up to Class AAA in all sports.

== See also ==
- Hampton County, South Carolina
