= Cottageville, South Carolina =

- Town
- Motto: "Growing Toward the Future"
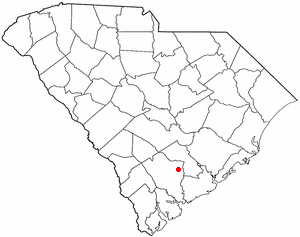
- Location of Cottageville, South Carolina
- Coordinates: 32°56′10″N 80°28′49″W
- Country: United States
- State: South Carolina
- County: Colleton

Area
  - Total: 3.42 sq mi (8.85 km^{2})
  - Land: 3.42 sq mi (8.85 km^{2})
  - Water: 0 sq mi (0.00 km^{2})
- Elevation: 46 ft (14 m)

Population (2020)
  - Total: 701
  - Density: 205.2/sq mi (79.23/km^{2})
- Time zone: UTC-5 (Eastern (EST))
  - Summer (DST): UTC-4 (EDT)
- ZIP code: 29435
- Area codes: 843, 854
- FIPS code: 45-16990
- GNIS feature ID: 2406317
- Website: www.cottageville.org

Cottageville is a town in Colleton County, South Carolina, United States. The population was 701 at the 2020 census.

== Geography and government facilities ==
Cottageville is in eastern Colleton County, along U.S. Route 17 Alt. Walterboro, the county seat, is 11 miles (18 km) to the west, and Summerville is 20 miles (32 km) to the east.

According to the United States Census Bureau, Cottageville has a total area of 3.4 square miles (8.8 km^{2}), all land.

Cottageville has a public library, a branch of the Colleton County Library System.

== Demographics ==
Historical population
Census	Pop.	Note	%±
1910	418		—
1920	444		6.2%
1930	465		4.7%
1940	544		17.0%
1950	553		1.7%
1960	520		−6.0%
1970	497		−4.4%
1980	371		−25.4%
1990	572		54.2%
2000	707		23.6%
2010	762		7.8%
2020	701		−8.0%
U.S. Decennial Census

As of the census of 2000, there were 707 people, 274 households, and 206 families residing in the town. The population density was 222.2 inhabitants per square mile (85.8/km^{2}). There were 310 housing units at an average density of 97.4 per square mile (37.6/km^{2}). The racial makeup of the town was 85.71% White, 11.88% African American, 0.42% Native American, 0.42% Asian, 0.14% Pacific Islander, 0.28% from other races, and 1.13% from two or more races. Hispanic or Latino of any race were 0.42% of the population.

There were 274 households, out of which 32.5% had children under the age of 18 living with them, 60.9% were married couples living together, 10.2% had a female householder with no husband present, and 24.8% were non-families. 21.5% of all households were made up of individuals, and 7.3% had someone living alone who was 65 years of age or older. The average household size was 2.58 and the average family size was 2.97.

In the town, the population was spread out, with 25.3% under the age of 18, 6.2% from 18 to 24, 28.7% from 25 to 44, 26.6% from 45 to 64, and 13.2% who were 65 years of age or older. The median age was 39 years. For every 100 females, there were 93.2 males. For every 100 females age 18 and over, there were 91.3 males.

The median income for a household in the town was $38,281, and the median income for a family was $44,583. Males had a median income of $29,886 versus $22,019 for females. The per capita income for the town was $16,765. About 14.7% of families and 18.7% of the population were below the poverty line, including 33.3% of those under age 18 and 10.3% of those age 65 or over.

== History ==
Cottageville was incorporated in 1937 because residents in the area desired a post office.

On May 16, 2011, the former mayor of Cottageville, Bert Reeves, was shot and killed by Cottageville Police Officer Randall Price. Price alleged that Reeves tried to assault him because Price had arrested Reeves' employee in March 2011. However, the attorney of the Reeves estate stated that Price was never at risk during the encounter and that Price boxed in Reeves' car without cause. Reeves' estate was awarded $97.5 million by a jury in a lawsuit against the city for negligence.

While in office, Reeves reduced the number of police officers in the Cottageville police department from six to three and lowered the department's reliance on speed ticket revenue.
