= Varnville, South Carolina =

- Town
- Motto: "People, Places & Prosperity"
- Location within South Carolina Location within the United States
- Coordinates: 32°51′07″N 81°04′49″W
- Country: United States
- State: South Carolina
- County: Hampton
- Established: 1872

Government
  - Type: Mayor–Council

Area
  - Total: 3.83 sq mi (9.93 km^{2})
  - Land: 3.83 sq mi (9.93 km^{2})
  - Water: 0 sq mi (0.00 km^{2})
- Elevation: 108 ft (33 m)

Population (2020)
  - Total: 1,669
  - Density: 435.5/sq mi (168.15/km^{2})
- Time zone: UTC-5 (Eastern (EST))
  - Summer (DST): UTC-4 (EDT)
- ZIP code: 29944
- Area codes: 803, 839
- FIPS code: 45-73600
- GNIS feature ID: 2406795
- Website: www.varnvillesc.org

Varnville is a town in Hampton County, South Carolina, United States. The population was 1,169 as of the 2020 census. Varnville forms a twin town with Hampton, the county seat; the two towns often share civic and cultural events.

== History ==
Varnville was founded by the Varn Brothers, who sold the right-of-way for railroad tracks through their sawmill in 1872, prior to Hampton County's founding. In 1878, Hampton County was created from Beaufort County, and the site for the county seat was located 3 miles (5 km) northwest of Varnville, eventually becoming the town of Hampton. Varnville grew as a result of its close proximity to the county seat as well as its connections with surrounding agricultural areas. In 1993, several scenes from the film Forrest Gump were shot in Varnville, of which some were used to create the fictional town of Greenbow, Alabama.

The Hattie J. Peeples House was listed on the National Register of Historic Places in 1992.

== Geography ==
Varnville is located in north-central Hampton County. It is bordered to the northwest by the town of Hampton. U.S. Route 278 (Carolina Avenue) is the main street through the town, leading northwest into Hampton (where it becomes Elm Street) and south 28 miles (45 km) to Ridgeland. South Carolina Highway 63 leads east from Varnville 27 miles (43 km) to Walterboro. Yemassee is 17 miles (27 km) to the southeast via US 278 and SC 68.

According to the United States Census Bureau, Varnville has a total area of 3.8 square miles (9.9 km^{2}), all land.

== Demographics ==
Historical population
Census	Pop.	Note	%±
1890	553		—
1900	372		−32.7%
1910	542		45.7%
1920	1,160		114.0%
1930	969		−16.5%
1940	917		−5.4%
1950	1,180		28.7%
1960	1,461		23.8%
1970	1,555		6.4%
1980	1,948		25.3%
1990	1,970		1.1%
2000	2,074		5.3%
2010	2,162		4.2%
2020	1,669		−22.8%
U.S. Decennial Census

=== 2020 census ===
Varnville racial composition
Race	Num.	Perc.
White (non-Hispanic)	568	34.03%
Black or African American (non-Hispanic)	1,033	61.89%
Native American	1	0.06%
Asian	5	0.3%
Pacific Islander	1	0.06%
Other/Mixed	30	1.8%
Hispanic or Latino	31	1.86%

As of the 2020 United States census, there were 1,669 people, 728 households, and 401 families residing in the town.

=== 2000 census ===
As of the census of 2000, there were 2,074 people, 795 households, and 539 families residing in the town. The population density was 548.4 inhabitants per square mile (211.7/km^{2}). There were 878 housing units at an average density of 232.2 per square mile (89.7/km^{2}). The racial makeup of the town was 60.32% African American, 38.72% White, 0.24% Native American, 0.05% Asian, 0.10% from other races, and 0.58% from two or more races. Hispanic or Latino of any race were 0.72% of the population.

There were 795 households, out of which 34.0% had children under the age of 18 living with them, 43.5% were married couples living together, 21.5% had a female householder with no husband present, and 32.1% were non-families. 29.7% of all households were made up of individuals, and 11.6% had someone living alone who was 65 years of age or older. The average household size was 2.56 and the average family size was 3.20.

In the town, the population was spread out, with 29.8% under the age of 18, 8.7% from 18 to 24, 27.1% from 25 to 44, 22.7% from 45 to 64, and 11.7% who were 65 years of age or older. The median age was 34 years. For every 100 females, there were 83.9 males. For every 100 females age 18 and over, there were 79.6 males.

The median income for a household in the town was $33,357, and the median income for a family was $38,750. Males had a median income of $33,750 versus $23,920 for females. The per capita income for the town was $15,706. About 17.9% of families and 20.9% of the population were below the poverty line, including 30.9% of those under age 18 and 16.1% of those age 65 or over.

== Education ==
Public education is provided by the Hampton County School District 1. Students attend Varnville Elementary School, North District Middle School, and Wade Hampton High School, all of which are located in Varnville proper. Patrick Henry Academy, located four miles west of Varnville, is the main private school in Hampton County. Varnville also is home to a branch of the Technical College of the Lowcountry for higher education.

== Notable natives and residents ==
- Randolph Murdaugh III of the Murdaugh family
- Dwight Smith, former Major League Baseball player
