= Ravenel, South Carolina =

- Town
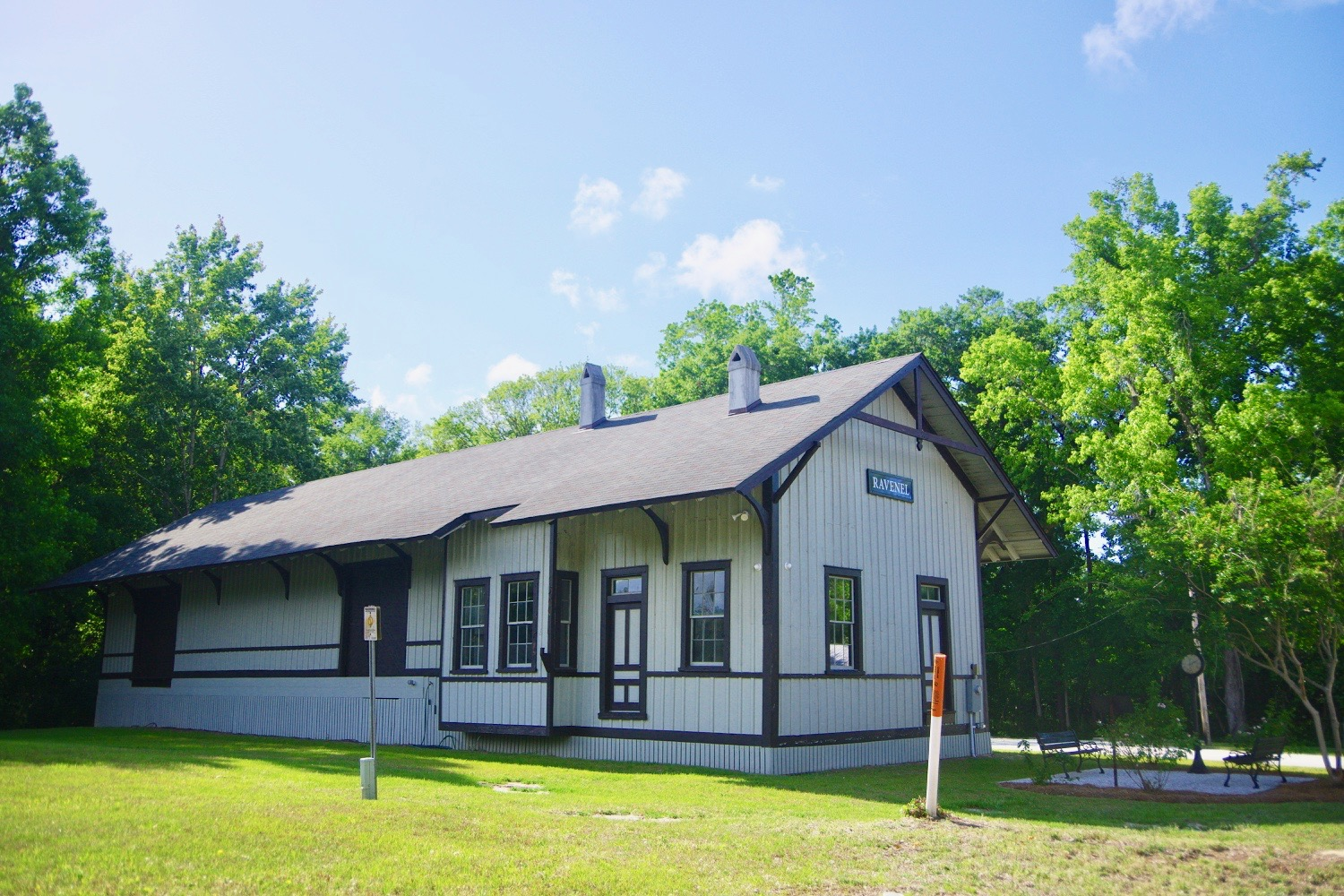
- Ravenel Depot

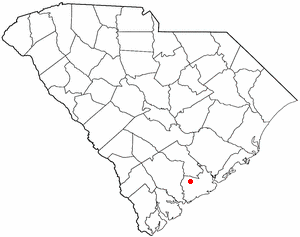
- Location of Ravenel in South Carolina
- Coordinates: 32°46′35″N 80°14′38″W
- Country: United States
- State: South Carolina
- County: Charleston

Area
  - Total: 13.18 sq mi (34.13 km^{2})
  - Land: 13.18 sq mi (34.13 km^{2})
  - Water: 0.0039 sq mi (0.01 km^{2})
- Elevation: 33 ft (10 m)

Population (2020)
  - Total: 2,542
  - Density: 192.9/sq mi (74.49/km^{2})
- Time zone: UTC-5 (EST)
  - Summer (DST): UTC-4 (EDT)
- ZIP code: 29470
- Area codes: 843, 854
- FIPS code: 45-59020
- GNIS feature ID: 2407178
- Website: www.townofravenel.com

Ravenel is a town in Charleston County, South Carolina, United States. As of the 2020 census, Ravenel had a population of 2,542. Ravenel is part of the Charleston-North Charleston-Summerville metropolitan area.

== Geography ==
Ravenel is located in western Charleston County at 32°46′41″N 80°13′16″W (32.777930, -80.221112). It is bordered to the south by the town of Hollywood. U.S. Route 17 passes through the town, leading 20 miles (32 km) east to Charleston and 13 miles (21 km) west to Jacksonboro.

According to the United States Census Bureau, Ravenel has a total area of 12.6 square miles (32.7 km^{2}), all land.

== Demographics ==
Historical population
Census	Pop.	Note	%±
1950	337		—
1960	527		56.4%
1970	931		76.7%
1980	1,655		77.8%
1990	2,165		30.8%
2000	2,214		2.3%
2010	2,465		11.3%
2020	2,542		3.1%
U.S. Decennial Census

=== 2020 census ===
Ravenel racial composition
Race	Num.	Perc.
White (non-Hispanic)	1,199	47.17%
Black or African American (non-Hispanic)	891	35.05%
Native American	10	0.39%
Asian	4	0.16%
Other/Mixed	62	2.44%
Hispanic or Latino	376	14.79%

As of the 2020 United States census, there were 2,542 people, 986 households, and 662 families residing in the town.

=== 2000 census ===
As of the census of 2000, there were 2,214 people, 799 households, and 581 families residing in the town. The population density was 179.5 inhabitants per square mile (69.3/km^{2}). There were 863 housing units at an average density of 70.0 per square mile (27.0/km^{2}). The racial makeup of the town was 47.88% White, 49.95% African American, 0.05% Native American, 0.41% Asian, 1.13% from other races, and 0.59% from two or more races. Hispanic or Latino of any race were 2.66% of the population.

There were 799 households, out of which 36.2% had children under the age of 18 living with them, 49.3% were married couples living together, 19.1% had a female householder with no husband present, and 27.2% were non-families. 21.0% of all households were made up of individuals, and 7.3% had someone living alone who was 65 years of age or older. The average household size was 2.76 and the average family size was 3.25.

In the town, the population was spread out, with 30.4% under the age of 18, 7.4% from 18 to 24, 28.5% from 25 to 44, 24.4% from 45 to 64, and 9.3% who were 65 years of age or older. The median age was 35 years. For every 100 females, there were 92.4 males. For every 100 females age 18 and over, there were 87.7 males.

The median income for a household in the town was $33,021, and the median income for a family was $36,477. Males had a median income of $33,009 versus $21,306 for females. The per capita income for the town was $15,495. About 15.9% of families and 18.3% of the population were below the poverty line, including 25.8% of those under age 18 and 11.9% of those age 65 or over.

== Government ==
The city is run by an elected mayor–council government system.

=== Mayor ===
Stephen W. Tumbleston

=== Council members ===
Robert L. Cochran, Terry Wilkinson, A. Gail Farrior, Jr., James R. Rodgers Jr., Harold T. "Buck" Dukes, Jr., Buckey Waters
