= South Carolina Highway 700 =

Highway in South Carolina

South Carolina Highway 700
- Maybank Highway

Route information
- Maintained by SCDOT
- Length: 20.380 mi (32.798 km)

Major junctions
- West end: Dead end in Rockville
- SC 171 in Charleston
- East end: US 17 in Charleston

Location
- Country: United States
- State: South Carolina
- Counties: Charleston

Highway system
- South Carolina State Highway System; Interstate; US; State; Scenic
← SC 692	→ US 701

South Carolina Highway 700 (SC 700) is a 20.380-mile (32.798 km) state highway in the U.S. state of South Carolina. Known for most of its length as Maybank Highway, the highway is named after Burnet R. Maybank. The state highway travels from a dead end in Rockville east to U.S. Route 17 (US 17) in Charleston. SC 700 connects Charleston with James Island, Johns Island, and Wadmalaw Island in southwestern Charleston County.

== Route description ==
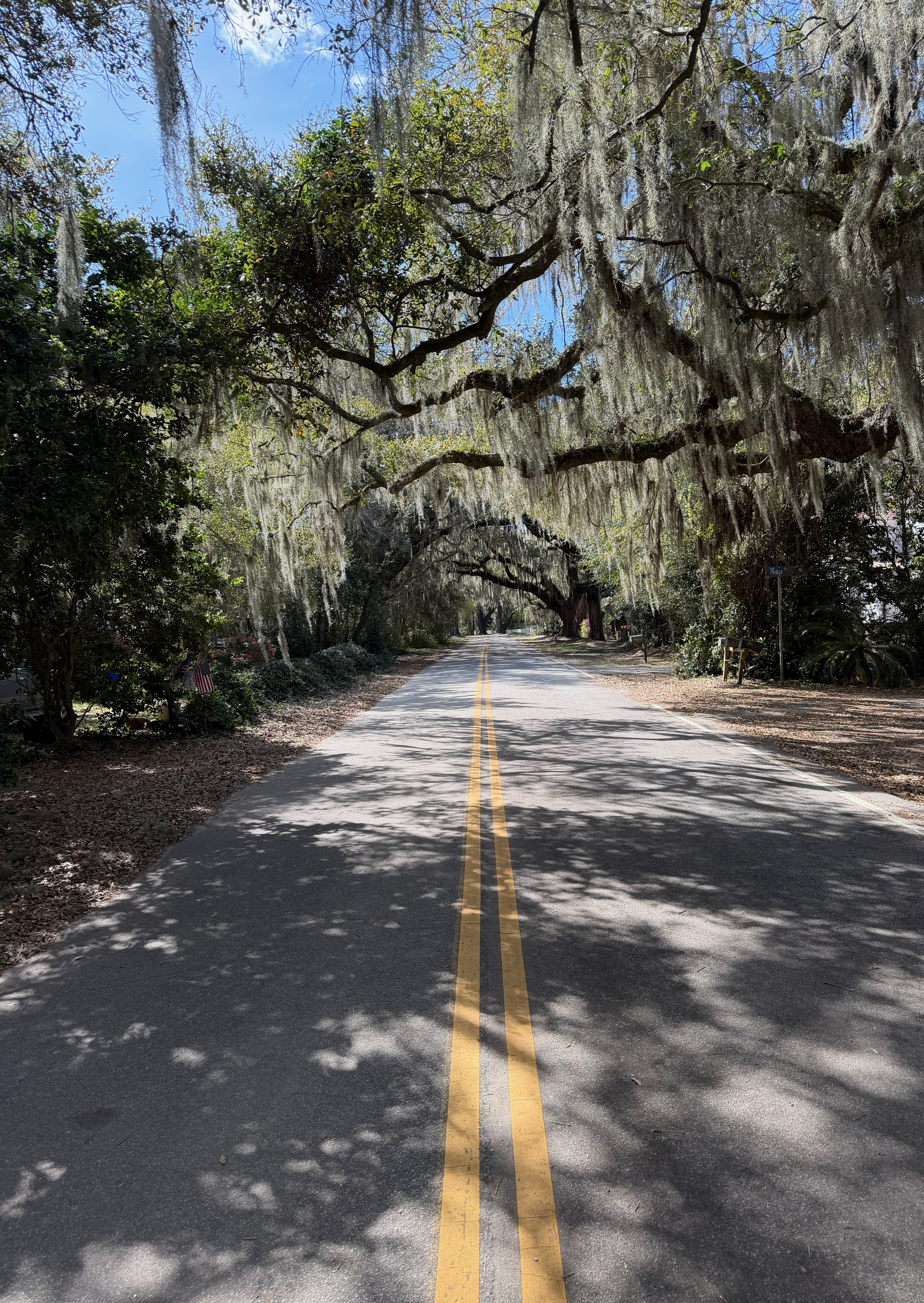
Near the beginning of SC 700, in Rockville, looking south

SC 700 begins at a dead end in the town of Rockville on Wadmalaw Island. The terminus is on the north side of Bohicket Creek, which separates Wadmalaw Island from Seabrook Island, a short distance east of Bohicket Creek's mouth on the North Edisto River. The state highway heads northeast as Maybank Highway, a two-lane road that passes by the Charleston Tea Plantation, the only working tea plantation in the United States, and near the Firefly Distillery, which is on Bear Bluff Road on the portion of the island north of Leadenwah Creek. SC 700 crosses Church Creek onto Johns Island, enters an outlying section of the city of Charleston, and arrives at the main crossroads of the island near the site of the venerable Angel Oak. Main Road heads north from the junction through the northern part of the island before crossing the Stono River on the John F. Limehouse Memorial Bridge to meet US 17 between Rantowles and Charleston. Bohicket Road heads south toward Seabrook Island and Kiawah Island. SC 700 continues east and near the eastern end of the island intersects River Road, which leads south to Charleston Executive Airport.

SC 700 expands to four lanes and crosses Pennys Creek and the Stono River on the high-level Paul Gelegotis Bridge and enters James Island. The highway passes through a golf course and along the south side of the historic Riverland Terrace neighborhood. SC 700 continues into a commercial area where the highway has a wye-type junction with SC 171 (Folly Road) west of the McLeod Plantation and Charleston Country Club. Old Folly Road is used for the movements from eastbound SC 700 to southbound SC 171 and from northbound SC 171 to westbound SC 700. SC 700 and SC 171 head north concurrently on Folly Road, which has two lanes northbound and three lanes southbound. The highways enter the West Ashley section of Charleston by crossing Wappoo Creek, part of the Intracoastal Waterway, on a drawbridge named for Burnet R. Maybank. SC 700 and SC 171 diverge at a directional intersection that does not allow access from southbound SR 171 to eastbound SC 700. SC 171 heads north as Wesley Drive and is used to access southbound US 17 (Savannah Highway) and SC 61 (St. Andrews Boulevard). SC 700 heads northeast as five-lane Folly Road (three lanes westbound and two lanes eastbound) to its eastern terminus at a partial interchange with US 17 just west of the U.S. Highway's interchange with SC 61 and its bridges over the Ashley River. The interchange allows access between SC 700 and US 17 in the direction of the peninsular section of Charleston.

== Major intersections ==
The entire route is in Charleston County.

Location	mi	km	Destinations	Notes
Rockville	0.000	0.000	Dead end	Western terminus
Charleston	18.990	30.561	SC 171 south (Folly Road) – Folly Beach	Western end of SC 171 concurrency
Charleston	19.960	32.123	SC 171 north (Wesley Drive) to US 17 south / SC 61 – North Charleston, Savannah	Eastern end of SC 171 concurrency
Charleston	20.380	32.798	US 17 north (Savannah Highway) – Charleston, Mount Pleasant	Southbound exit from and northbound entrance to US 17; eastern terminus
1.000 mi = 1.609 km; 1.000 km = 0.621 mi: Concurrency terminus; Incomplete access

== Gallery ==
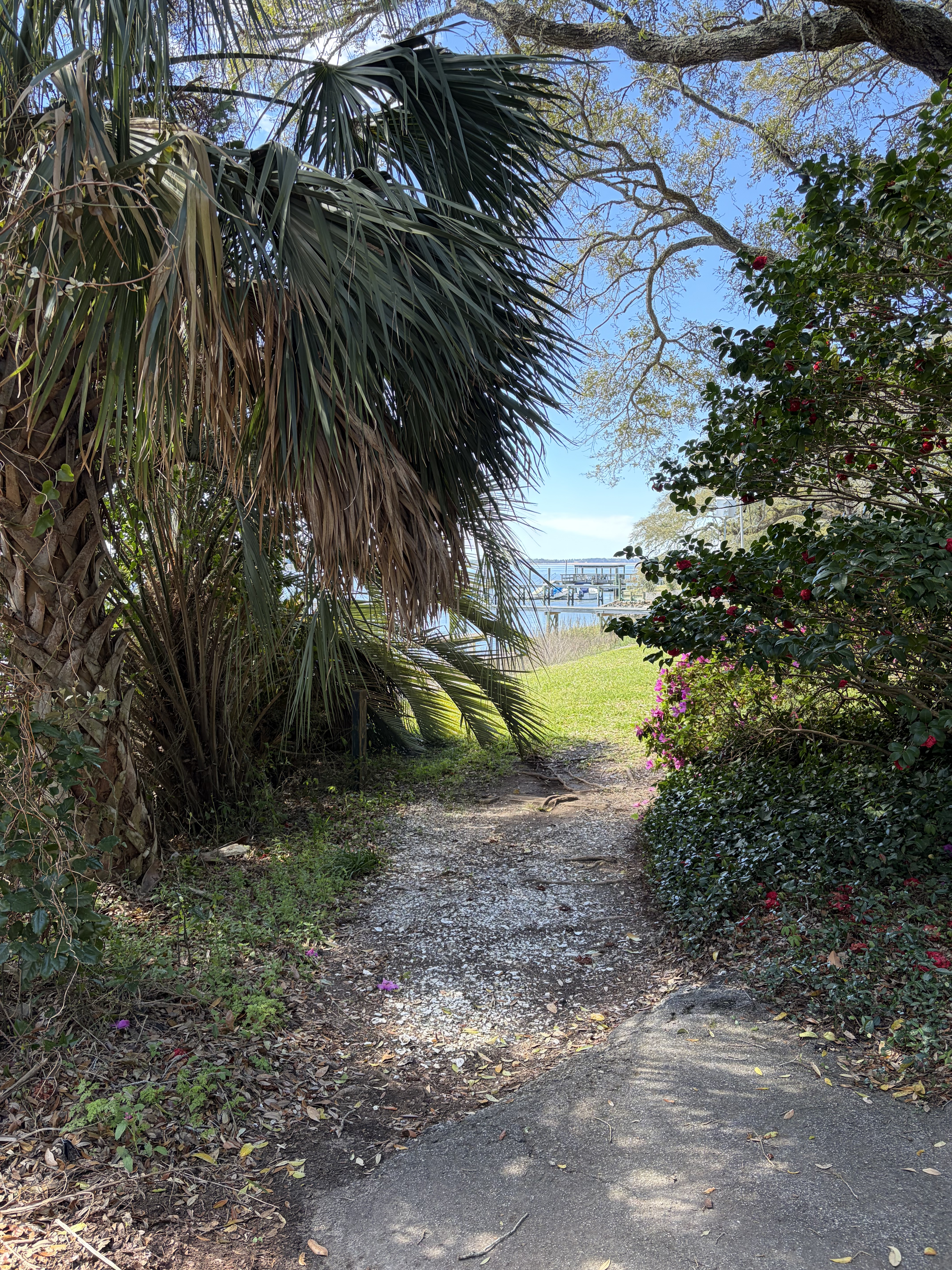
The very beginning of the road in Rockville
