= List of bridges documented by the Historic American Engineering Record in South Carolina =

This is a list of bridges documented by the Historic American Engineering Record in the U.S. state of South Carolina.

== Bridges ==
Survey No.	Name (as assigned by HAER)	Status	Type	Built	Documented	Carries	Crosses	Location	County	Coordinates
GA-38	Georgia–Carolina Memorial Bridge	Replaced	Reinforced concrete open-spandrel arch	1927	1980	SC 72 / SR 72	Savannah River	Calhoun Falls, South Carolina, and Elberton, Georgia	Abbeville County, South Carolina, and Elbert County, Georgia	34°04′12″N 82°38′32″W
GA-39; GA-49	Smith–McGee Bridge; Hart County Bridge	Bypassed	Parker truss	1922	1980; 1982	SC 181 / SR 181	Savannah River	Starr, South Carolina, and Hartwell, Georgia	Anderson County, South Carolina, and Hart County, Georgia	34°19′28″N 82°47′29″W
GA-146	Sand Bar Ferry Bridge	Replaced	Parker truss	1922	1987	SC 28 / SR 28	Savannah River	Beech Island, South Carolina, and Augusta, Georgia	Aiken County, South Carolina, and Richmond County, Georgia	33°26′23″N 81°54′48″W
SC-2	Sanders Ferry Bridge	Replaced	Parker truss	1927	1980	SC 184 / SR 368	Savannah River	Iva, South Carolina, and Elberton, Georgia	Anderson County, South Carolina, and Elbert County, Georgia	34°15′19″N 82°44′45″W
SC-4	Road S-47 Bridge	Replaced	Pratt truss	1929	1987	Road S-47	Deep Creek	Ruby	Chesterfield	34°45′47″N 80°09′49″W
SC-6	Seaboard Coast Line Railroad Bridge	Extant	Steel built-up girder	1930	1980	Seaboard Coast Line Railroad	Savannah River	Calhoun Falls, South Carolina, and Elberton, Georgia	Abbeville County, South Carolina, and Elbert County, Georgia	34°04′48″N 82°38′40″W
SC-8	Edgefield County Bridge No. 3	Replaced	Pratt truss	1912	1984	Road S-63	Log Creek	Pleasant Lane	Edgefield	33°52′33″N 82°01′14″W
SC-9	Saluda County Bridge No. 4	Unknown	Warren truss	1930	1984	Road S-26	Clouds Creek	Jones Crossroads	Saluda	
SC-14	Poinsett Bridge	Extant	Stone arch	1820	1986	Poinsett Bridge Heritage Preserve trail	Little Gap Creek	Tigerville	Greenville	35°07′46″N 82°23′03″W
SC-16	Gervais Street Bridge	Extant	Reinforced concrete open-spandrel arch	1927	1986	US 1 / US 378 (Gervais Street)	Congaree River	Columbia	Richland	33°59′42″N 81°03′11″W
SC-21	Saluda 1 Bridge	Replaced	Warren truss	1930	1987	SC 39	Saluda River	Chappells	Newberry and Saluda	34°10′29″N 81°51′51″W
SC-23	U.S. Route 1-601 Bridge	Replaced	Steel built-up girder	1942	1997	US 1 / US 601	Wateree River	Camden	Kershaw	34°14′44″N 80°39′11″W
SC-24	Stono River Bridge	Replaced	Swing span	1929	1997	SC 700	Stono River	Johns Island	Charleston	32°47′09″N 80°06′28″W
SC-25	U.S. Route 78 Bridge	Replaced	Reinforced concrete girder	1926	1998	US 78	CSX Transportation and Meeting Street (Road S-39)	North Charleston	Charleston	32°50′43″N 79°58′05″W
SC-26	Road S-1-133 Bridge	Replaced	Warren truss	1923	1998	Road S-133	Long Cane Creek	Abbeville	Abbeville	34°11′16″N 82°18′23″W
SC-32	Grace Memorial Bridge	Replaced	Cantilever	1929	2000	US 17	Cooper River and Town Creek	Charleston and Mount Pleasant	Charleston	32°48′07″N 79°55′53″W
SC-33	Salkehatchie Bridge	Replaced	Reinforced concrete girder	1925	2001	SC 64 eastbound	Salkehatchie River	Barnwell	Barnwell	33°14′26″N 81°24′28″W
SC-34	CSX Railroad Bridge (U.S. Route 76)	Replaced	Reinforced concrete girder	1928	2001	US 76	CSX Transportation	Jalapa	Newberry	34°20′05″N 81°40′28″W
SC-35	West Branch Bridge	Bypassed	Reinforced concrete girder	1900	2001	Road S-569	Pacolet River west branch	Pacolet	Spartanburg	34°55′10″N 81°44′46″W
SC-37	U.S. 15 Santee River Bridge	Replaced	Parker truss	1927	2002	SC 45	Santee-Cooper Diversion Canal	Eadytown	Berkeley	33°23′03″N 80°08′20″W
SC-38	South Carolina Route 391 Bridge	Replaced	Warren truss	1929	1987	SC 391	Saluda River	Saluda	Newberry and Saluda	34°06′00″N 81°34′07″W
SC-39	Road S-455 Bridge	Replaced	Pennsylvania truss	1930	1987	Road S-455	Reedy River	Greenville	Greenville	34°34′43″N 82°15′22″W
SC-40	South Carolina Route 174 Bridge	Replaced	Swing span	1924	1987	SC 174	Dawhoo River	Charleston	Charleston	32°38′14″N 80°20′25″W
SC-41	Broad River Bridge	Replaced	Pratt truss	1932	2004	US 29	Broad River	Gaffney	Cherokee	35°05′19″N 81°34′19″W
SC-42	Chattooga River Bridge	Replaced	Parker truss	1900	2005	US 76	Chattooga River	Walhalla, South Carolina, and Clayton, Georgia	Oconee County, South Carolina, and Rabun County, Georgia	34°48′52″N 83°18′24″W
