= South Carolina Highway 461 =

South Carolina state highway

South Carolina Highway 461

Route information
- Maintained by SCDOT
- Length: 3.710 mi (5.971 km)

Major junctions
- South end: SC 61 in Charleston, South Carolina
- I-526 in Charleston
- North end: Bees Ferry Road in Charleston

Location
- Country: United States
- State: South Carolina
- Counties: Charleston

Highway system
- South Carolina State Highway System; Interstate; US; State; Scenic
← SC 460	→ SC 462

South Carolina Highway 461 (SC 461) is a 3.710-mile-long (5.971 km) state highway in the U.S. state of South Carolina. The highway is completely within the West Ashley portion of Charleston.

== Route description ==
SC 461 begins at an intersection with SC 61 (Ashley River Road) in the West Ashley portion of Charleston, Charleston County. Here it is known as Paul Cantrell Boulevard. It travels to the west and immediately curves to the west-northwest before an interchange with Interstate 526 (I-526; Mark Clark Expressway). At an intersection with Magwood Drive, the highway takes on the Glenn McConnell Parkway name. It passes southwest of West Ashley Park and northeast of West Ashley High School. The highway crosses over some railroad tracks just before it meets its northern terminus, an intersection with Bees Ferry Road.

== Major intersections ==
The entire route is in Charleston, Charleston County.

mi	km	Destinations	Notes
0.000	0.000	SC 61 south (Ashley River Road)	No access from SC 461 to SC 61 north; southern terminus
0.360	0.579	Tobias Gadson Boulevard to SC 61 north	
0.770	1.239	I-526 east (Mark Clark Expressway) – North Charleston	I-526 exit 11; no access from SC 461 north to I-526 west
1.220	1.963	Magwood Drive to SC 61 south	Local name changes from Paul Cantrell Boulevard to Glenn McConnell Parkway
3.710	5.971	Bees Ferry Road to US 17 / SC 61 – Summerville, Historic Ashley River Plantation District	Northern terminus
1.000 mi = 1.609 km; 1.000 km = 0.621 mi: Incomplete access; Route transition
