= Stono (disambiguation) =

Stono is a historic home in Lexington, Virginia.

Stono may also refer to:

== South Carolina ==
- Stono River, a tidal channel southwest of Charleston, South Carolina
- Stono (South Carolina), an 18th-century plantation, formerly located by the Stono River near Charleston, South Carolina (USA); see Paleontology in South Carolina
- Stono Bridge, a bridge which crosses the Stono River
- Stono Rebellion, a slave rebellion that broke out in 1739 in the then-British colony of South Carolina
- Battle of Stono Ferry, an American Revolutionary War battle, fought June 20, 1779, near Charleston

== Missouri ==
- Stono Mountain, a summit in St. Francois County in the state of Missouri (USA)

== Other uses ==
- CSS Stono, name given to the USS Isaac Smith, a screw steamer captured in 1863 by Confederate forces during the American Civil War
