= South Carolina Highway 30 (disambiguation) =

South Carolina Highway 30 may refer to:

- South Carolina Highway 30, a state highway, from James Island to downtown Charleston, which is slated to become part of an extended I-526
- South Carolina Highway 30 (1920s), a former state highway from Beaufort to near McColl
- South Carolina Highway 30 (1935–1956), a former state highway from Watts Mills to near Cross Anchor
