= South Carolina Highway 692 =

State highway in South Carolina, United States

South Carolina Highway 692

Route information
- Maintained by SCDOT
- Length: 9.100 mi (14.645 km)

Major junctions
- West end: US 321 in Swansea
- East end: SC 172 near North

Location
- Country: United States
- State: South Carolina
- Counties: Lexington, Orangeburg

Highway system
- South Carolina State Highway System; Interstate; US; State; Scenic
← SC 652	→ SC 700

South Carolina Highway 692 (SC 692) is a 9.100-mile (14.645 km) state highway in the U.S. state of South Carolina. The highway connects mostly rural areas of Orangeburg and Lexington counties with Swansea. It runs generally north and south though it is officially designated as an east-west highway with its western terminus at U.S. Route 321 (US 321) in Swansea and its eastern terminus at SC 172 east-northeast of North.

== Route description ==
SC 692 begins at the intersection of South Church Street (US 321) and 5th Street in Swansea. After passing a pair of churches at the beginning of the highway, SC 692 heads east through a residential neighborhood and passing the football stadium for Swansea High School. It exits the town limits, curves to the southeast, and begins to travel through a more rural setting including farmlands and woods. It crosses Third Creek, curves to the south, and enters Orangeburg County. SC 692 continues south crossing Cow Branch and Gardner Branch. After its bridging of Little Bull Swamp Creek, SC 692 reaches its eastern terminus, an intersection with SC 172 in front of a church.

== Major intersections ==
County	Location	mi	km	Destinations	Notes
Lexington	Swansea	0.000	0.000	US 321 (South Church Street) / West 5th Street	Western teminus
Orangeburg		9.100	14.645	SC 172 east (Bull Swamp Road) – St. Matthews	Eastern terminus
1.000 mi = 1.609 km; 1.000 km = 0.621 mi
