= Wappoo Creek Bridge =

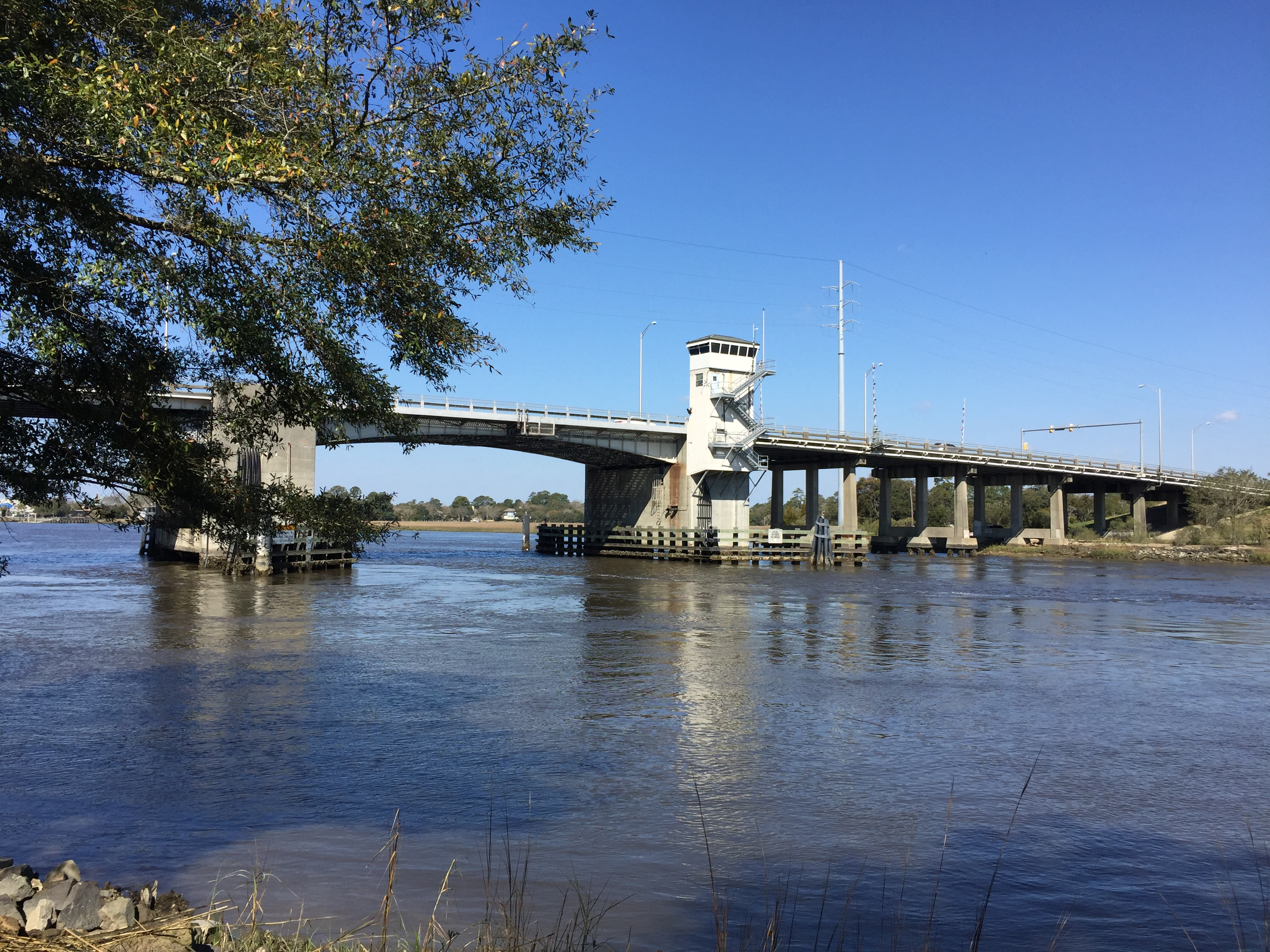
- The Wappoo Creek Bridge crosses the Wappoo Creek.
- Coordinates: 32°45′59″N 79°58′27″W
- Carries: SC 171 (Folly Road)
- Crosses: Wappoo Creek
- Locale: James Island – Charleston, South Carolina, United States
- Official name: Burnet R. Maybank Memorial Bridge
- Maintained by: South Carolina Department of Transportation

Characteristics
- Design: Draw bridge
- Clearance above: 30 feet (9.1 m)

History
- Opened: June 12, 1956

Location
- Interactive map of Wappoo Creek Bridge

The Wappoo Creek Bridge is a bridge that connects the cities of Charleston and James Island in South Carolina.

No bridge crossed the Wappoo Cut at the present location historically. A private company was chartered in 1896 and began raising funds. In 1898, when the idea of building a bridge was raised, phosphate companies, lumber companies, and towboat companies were aligned against the proposal for fear of its impact on their shipping businesses.

A wooden bridge was added over the Wappoo Creek. That first bridge operated as a toll bridge until the privately owned span was bought by the county in 1918. The county negotiated the price down to $8500 from $12,500, explaining that about $3500 of repairs were needed.

The second bridge, opened in 1926, was a 434 foot span of concrete and metal. The earlier bridge had been rendered inadequate by the new developments on James Island including the Charleston County Club. When opened, the bridge was a swing bridge with a roadway 20 feet wide. The 1926 bridge was designed by James L. Parker and was built by the Sanitary and Drainage Commission of Charleston County with the Salmons-Clement Co. as the concrete contractor at a cost of $140,000.

The 1926 swing bridge was, like the first bridge, inadequate for the increases in traffic. In 1949, funding (about $400,000) was secured for a larger bridge that would not have to be opened as frequently to permit small boats to pass. The replacement span was expected to be about 20 higher (30 feet versus 10.5 feet) than the swing span and was to be built 500 feet westward of the swing bridge to alleviate sharp turns on the approach. Surveying work for the draw bridge began in 1954.

The current bridge was named to honor Burnet R. Maybank. The $900,000 bridge opened to traffic on June 12, 1956.
