= South Carolina Highway 7 =

State highway in Charleston County, South Carolina

South Carolina Highway 7

Route information
- Maintained by SCDOT
- Length: 5.920 mi (9.527 km)
- Existed: 1956–present

Major junctions
- South end: US 17 in Charleston
- I-526 in Charleston; I-26 in North Charleston
- North end: US 52 / US 78 in North Charleston

Location
- Country: United States
- State: South Carolina
- Counties: Charleston

Highway system
- South Carolina State Highway System; Interstate; US; State; Scenic
← SC 6	→ SC 8

South Carolina Highway 7 (SC 7) is a 5.92-mile-long (9.53 km) state highway in the east-central part of the U.S. state of South Carolina. The route connects the West Ashley part of the city of Charleston with North Charleston.

== Route description ==
SC 7 begins at an intersection with U.S. Route 17 (US 17; Savannah Highway) in West Ashley. Here, it also has an interchange with Interstate 526 (I-526). It heads east-northeast to an intersection with SC 61. A little while later, it meets the northern terminus of SC 171. Then, the highway crosses over the Ashley River. On the east side of the river, SC 7 enters North Charleston. Almost immediately is an interchange with I-26. About one mile (1.6 km) later, it meets its northern terminus, an intersection with US 52/US 78 (Rivers Avenue).

== Major intersections ==
The entire route is in Charleston County.

Location	mi	km	Destinations	Notes
Charleston	0.000	0.000	US 17 – Charleston, Jacksonboro	Southern terminus
Charleston	0.150– 0.160	0.241– 0.257	I-526 east – North Charleston	I-526 exit 10; no access to eastbound I-526 from northbound SC 7
Charleston	1.290	2.076	SC 61 (Ashley River Road) – Folly Beach, Summerville	
Charleston	3.080	4.957	SC 171 south (Old Towne Road) – Johns Island	Northern terminus of SC 171
North Charleston	4.990	8.031	I-26 – Summerville, Charleston	I-26 exits 216 A–B
North Charleston	5.920	9.527	US 52 / US 78 (Rivers Avenue) / Cosgrove Avenue north – Hanahan, Charleston	Northern terminus; Cosgrove Avenue continues past.
1.000 mi = 1.609 km; 1.000 km = 0.621 mi: Incomplete access
