= McKinley Washington Jr. Bridge =

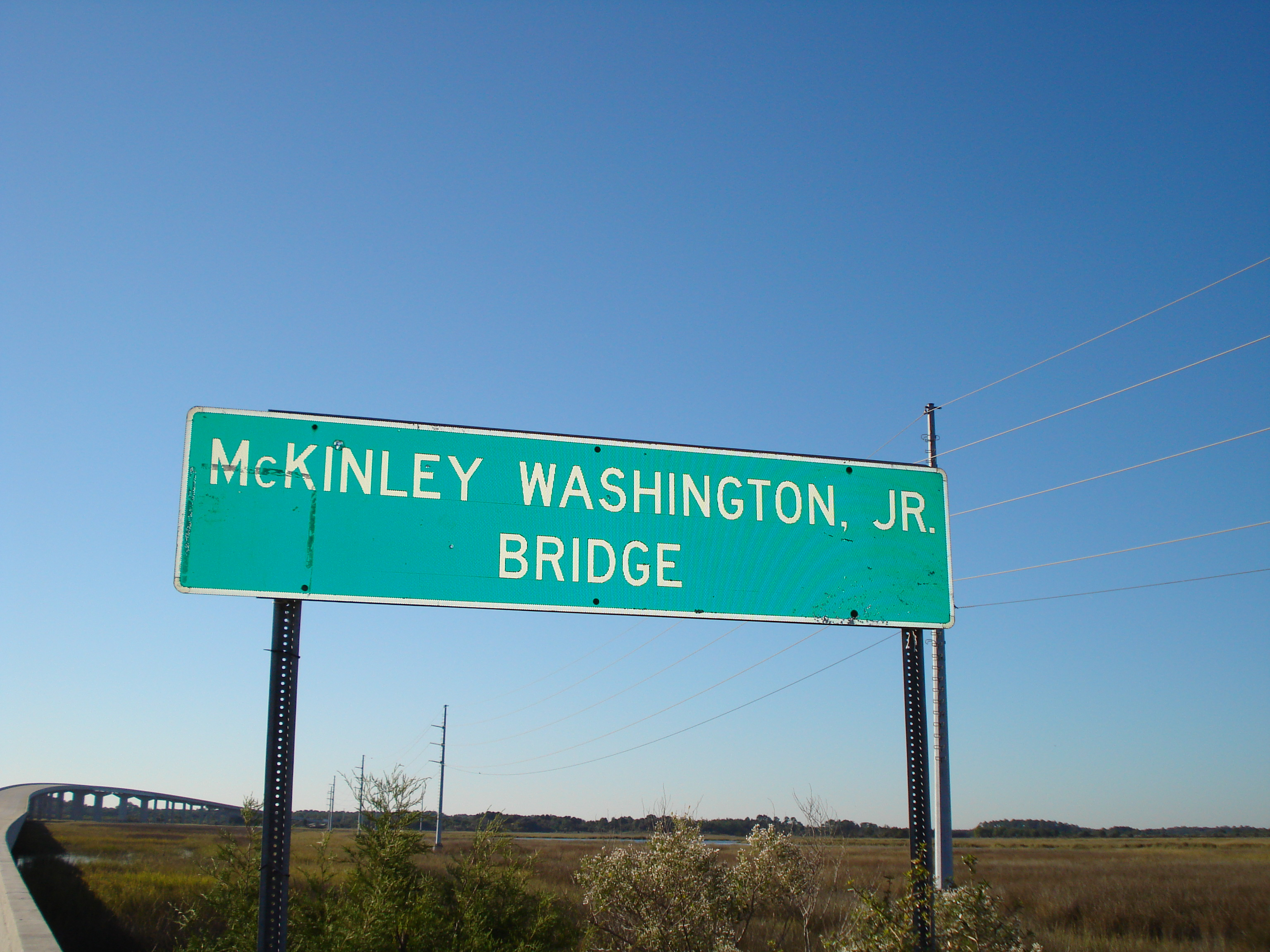
- Coordinates: 32°38′14″N 80°20′25″W
- Carries: SC 174
- Crosses: Dawhoo River
- Locale: Edisto Island, South Carolina
- Official name: McKinley Washington Jr. Bridge
- Maintained by: SCDOT
- ID number: 001040017400400

Characteristics
- Design: Steel girder
- Total length: 1,702 meters (5,584 ft)
- Width: 16.4 meters (54 ft)
- No. of spans: 97
- Clearance below: 20.7 meters (68 ft)

Statistics
- Daily traffic: 4500

The McKinley Washington Jr. Bridge, or the Dawhoo River Bridge, connects Edisto Island on the coast of South Carolina to the mainland. It carries South Carolina Highway 174. The bridge is named for McKinley Washington Jr., who served in the South Carolina General Assembly, representing the area and leading the effort to appropriate funds to replace the bridge.

== History of the crossing ==
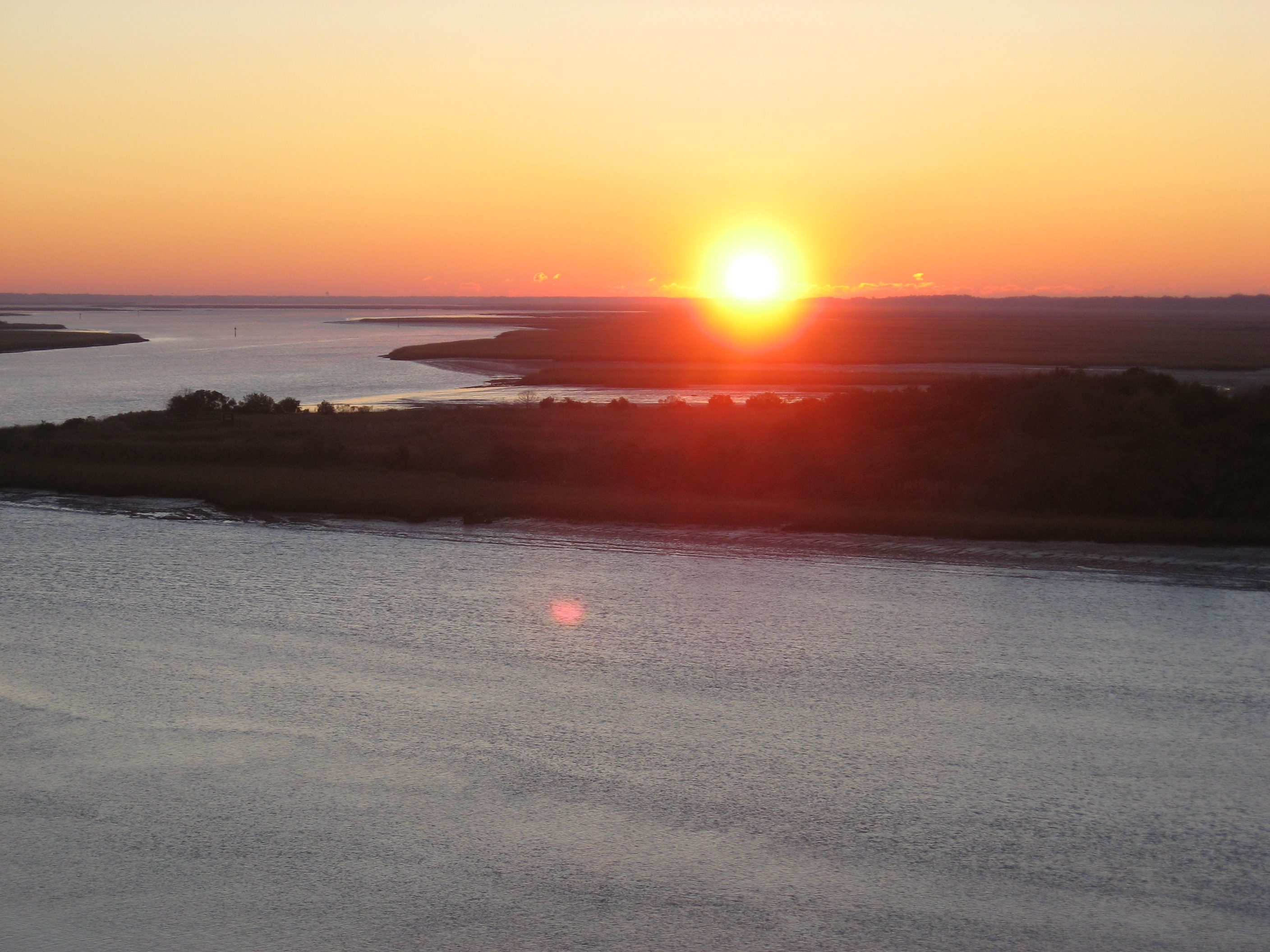
View from crest of the bridge

This is the third bridge in the same location, replacing a swing bridge that caused traffic delays when it opened for boats.

The first bridge opened in 1920 and was a single-lane swing span that was opened manually by the bridge tender. Funds to build the bridge came from $6,000 in bonds sold by the Township Commissioners for Edisto Island. The sale of bonds being authorized by the General Assembly.

The second bridge opened in 1950. It was a two-lane electrically powered swing span. When closed, it only provided for 8 feet (2.4 m) of clearance below the bridge for boat traffic.

The current bridge was dedicated on September 25, 1993.

== See also ==
- List of bridges documented by the Historic American Engineering Record in South Carolina
