= Paul Gelegotis Bridge =

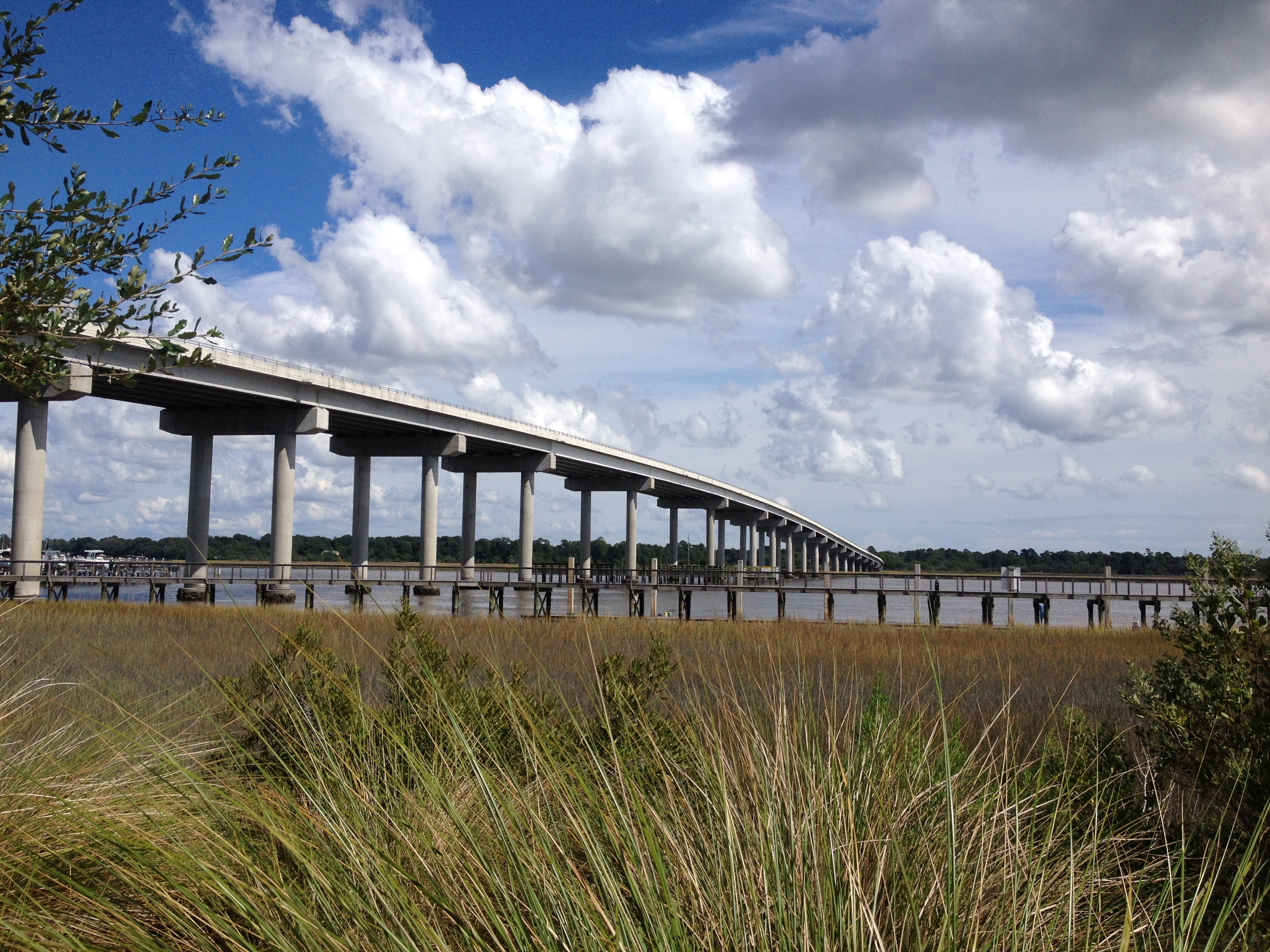
- Coordinates: 32°45′10.71″N 80°0′37.35″W
- Carries: SC 700 (Maybank Highway)
- Crosses: Stono River
- Locale: James Island – John's Island, South Carolina, United States
- Official name: Paul Gelegotis Bridge
- Maintained by: South Carolina Department of Transportation

Characteristics
- Total length: 7,300 feet (2,200 m)
- Clearance below: 65 feet (20 m) (high water)

History
- Opened: 2003

The Paul Gelegotis Bridge, also known as the Stono Bridge, is located in Charleston, South Carolina, United States; it connects James Island and Johns Island on SC 700 (Maybank Highway). This bridge opened in late 2003, on the historically significant site of a series of former Stono Bridges.

== History ==
The bridge survived an attempt by Union forces to burn it during the American Civil War. Union troops floated burning rafts down to the Stono Bridge, hoping the wooden structure would catch fire and burn. However, their efforts were thwarted by a Lieutenant Smith, who along with members of a naval battalion, brought the rafts to shore.

There have been several bridges in this location; the last variation was a two lane bridge 1,416 feet (432 m)-long, which was built in 1928, and later refurbished in 1950. This swing-span drawbridge used a 156-foot (48 m)-long steel-truss which left little room for even small vessels to pass beneath unless it was open.

== The Paul Gelegotis Bridge (new bridge) ==
The Gelegotis Bridge is a four-lane 7,300-foot (2,200 m)-long structure, which began operation in 2003. The new elevated design allows auto traffic to move faster, while vessels pass under a 65-foot (20 m) clearance and through 90 feet (27 m) of horizontal clearance between the bridge supports.

This bridge is named after Paul Gelegotis, a James Island businessman and politician who started the EMS ambulance service in South Carolina in 1973.

The South Carolina Department of Transportation opened two lanes to vehicles in November 2003 and opened the remaining two lanes in June 2004. Three construction accidents delayed the opening by six months, two of these were caused by cranes falling onto the structure; the third was a worker falling 30 feet (9.1 m) from a crane. The new bridge incorporates vehicle emergency lanes, but no demarcated bicycle lanes or sidewalks. It is the first bridge designed to include the South Carolina Department of Transportation's new seismic design criteria. In total, construction of the bridge cost approximately $41.5 million. The bridge was dedicated June 17, 2004.

As a result of increased traffic flow and speed over the new bridge, Charleston is considering spending approximately two million dollars to build a tunnel beneath the bridge approach ramps so golf carts and pedestrians are able to safely cross.

== See also ==
- John F. Limehouse Memorial Bridge several miles west of this bridge, completed the same year
