= Ashley River Historic District =

Historic district in South Carolina, United States

- U.S. National Register of Historic Places
- U.S. Historic district
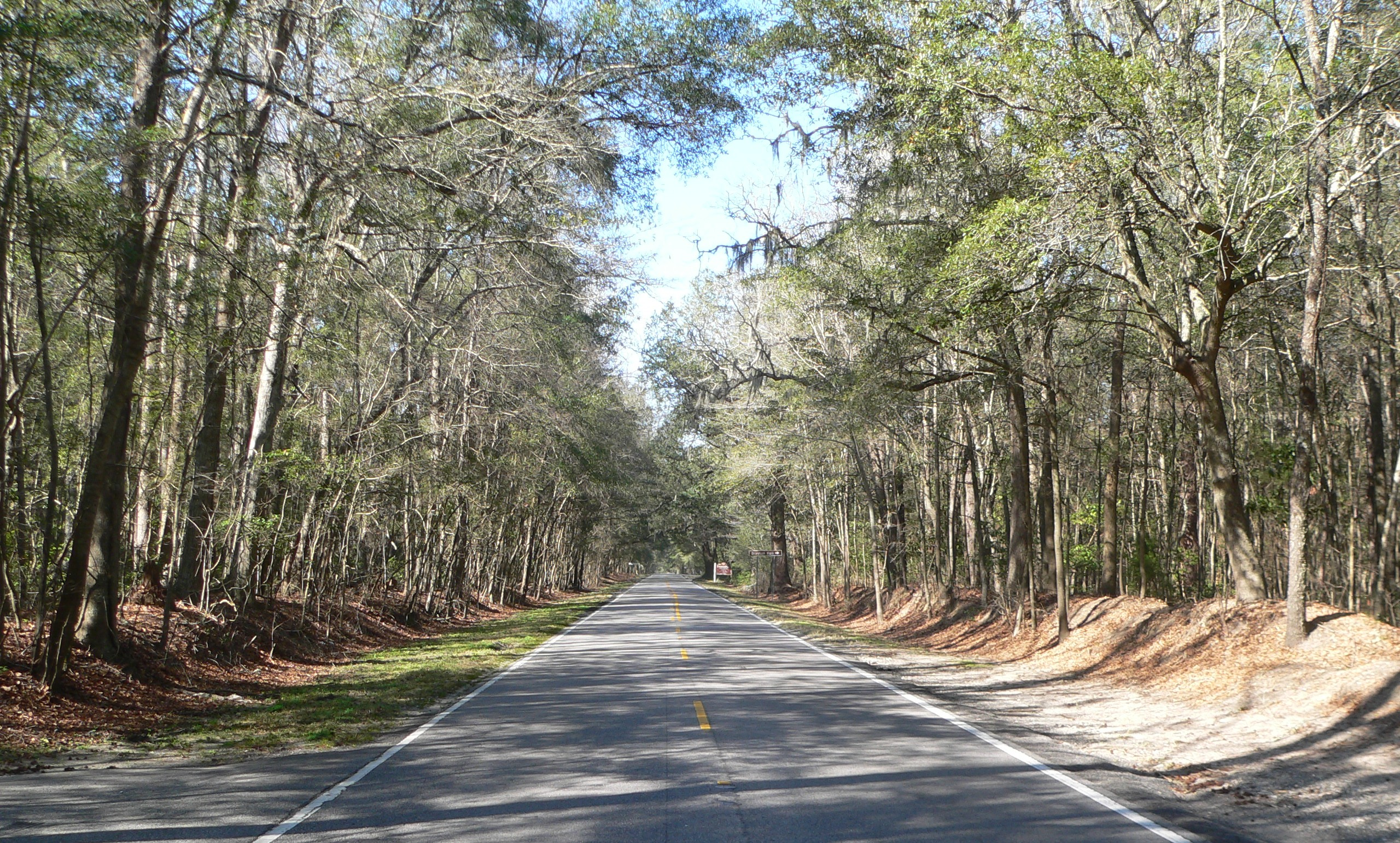
- Ashley River Road 1.8 mi N of Bees Ferry Rd

- Location within South Carolina Location within the United States
- Nearest city: Charleston, South Carolina and Summerville, South Carolina
- Coordinates: 32°54′45″N 80°07′22″W
- Area: 23,828.26 acres (9,642.95 ha)
- Architectural style: Georgian, Italianate
- NRHP reference No.: 93001514

Significant dates
- Added to NRHP: September 12, 1994
- Boundary increase: October 22, 2010

Ashley River Historic District is a historic district located west of the Ashley in the South Carolina Lowcountry in Charleston, South Carolina, United States. The Historic District includes land from five municipalities, almost equally split between Charleston and Dorchester counties. The district includes dry land, swamps, and marshes of the Rantowles Creek and Stono Swamp watershed.

The historic district includes historic and archaeological resources associated with the rice culture and phosphate mining of the early-eighteenth century to the mid-nineteenth century, and the hunting plantations and timber industry preserves of the late nineteenth century through the mid-twentieth century. Historically, the Wando, Cooper, Ashley, Stono, and Edisto rivers served as the primary transportation routes in the Lowcountry. These waterways were used for exploration and settlement, the movement of goods, and the cultivation of staple crops.

It was listed on the National Register of Historic Places in 1994. Its boundaries were increased from 7,000 acres to 23,828.26 acres on October 22, 2010.

It includes some of the following separately listed sites as contributing properties:

- Ashley River
- Ashley River Road
- Fort Bull
- Atlantic Coast Line Railroad Trestle
- Drayton Hall, a National Historic Landmark;
- Magnolia Plantation and Gardens (Charleston, South Carolina);
- Runnymeade Schoolhouse
- Middleton Place, another National Historic Landmark
- Old Dorchester;
- The Laurels
- MacLaura Hall

== Gallery ==
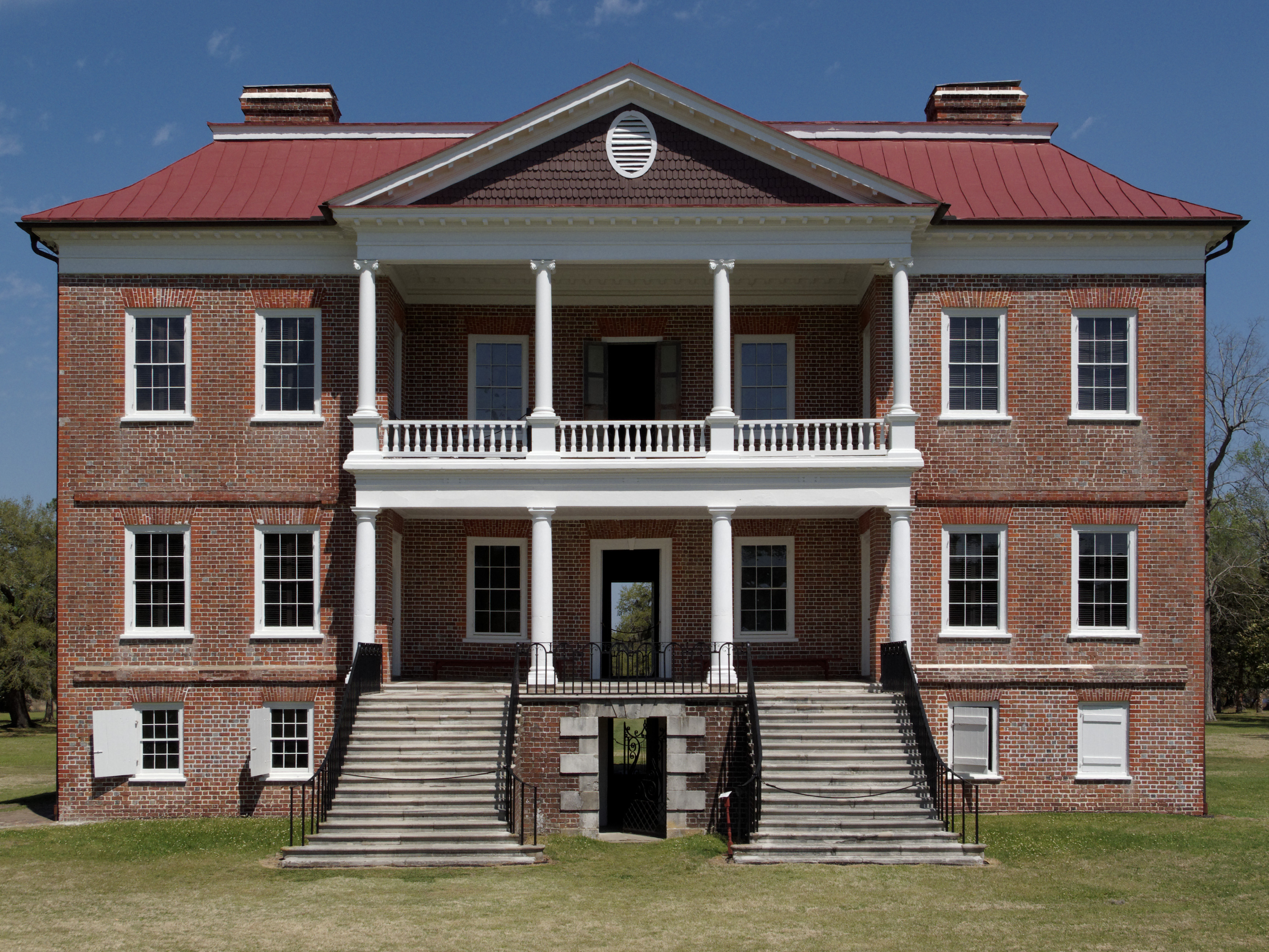
Drayton Hall, front view

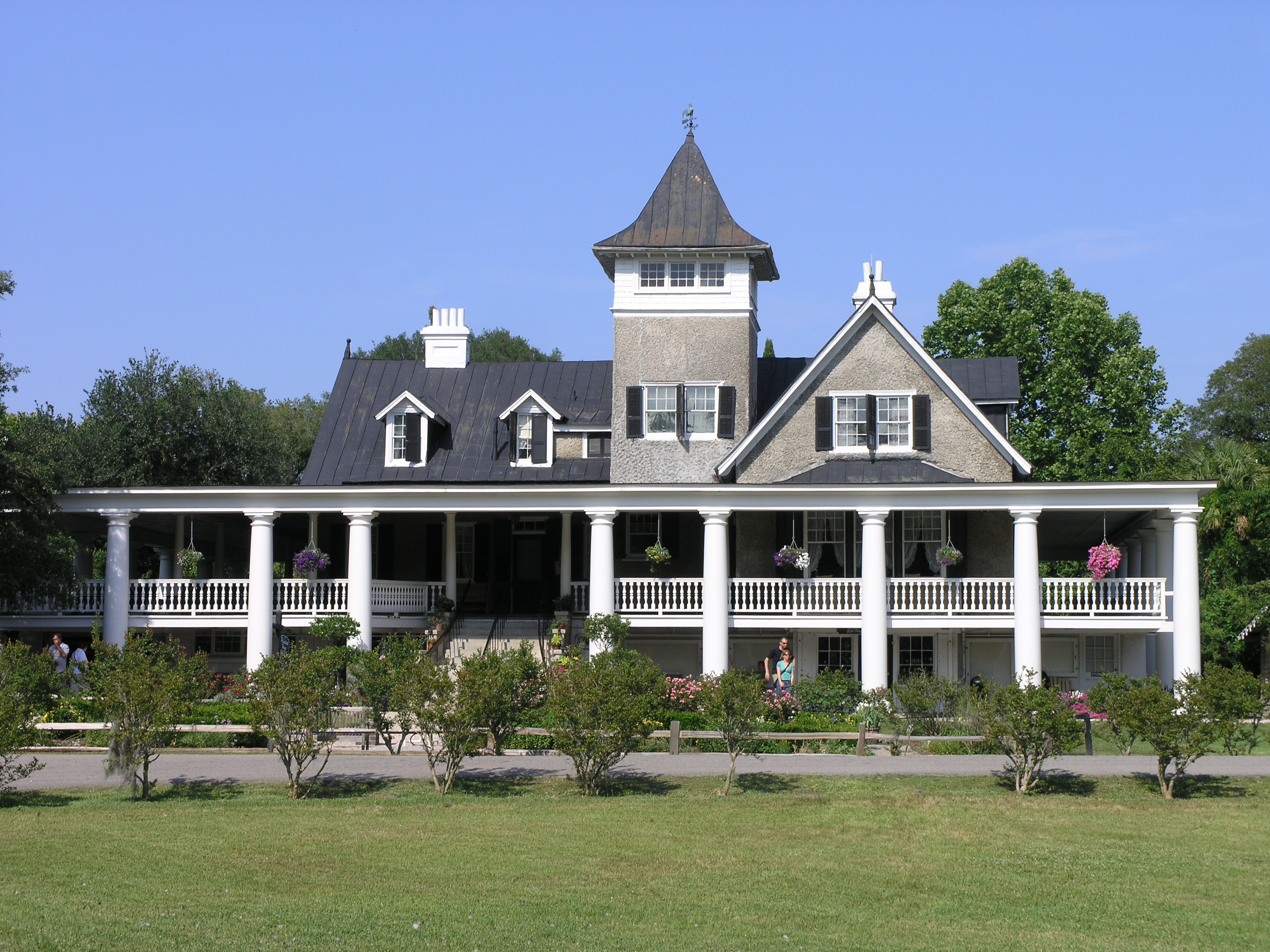
House at Magnolia Plantation

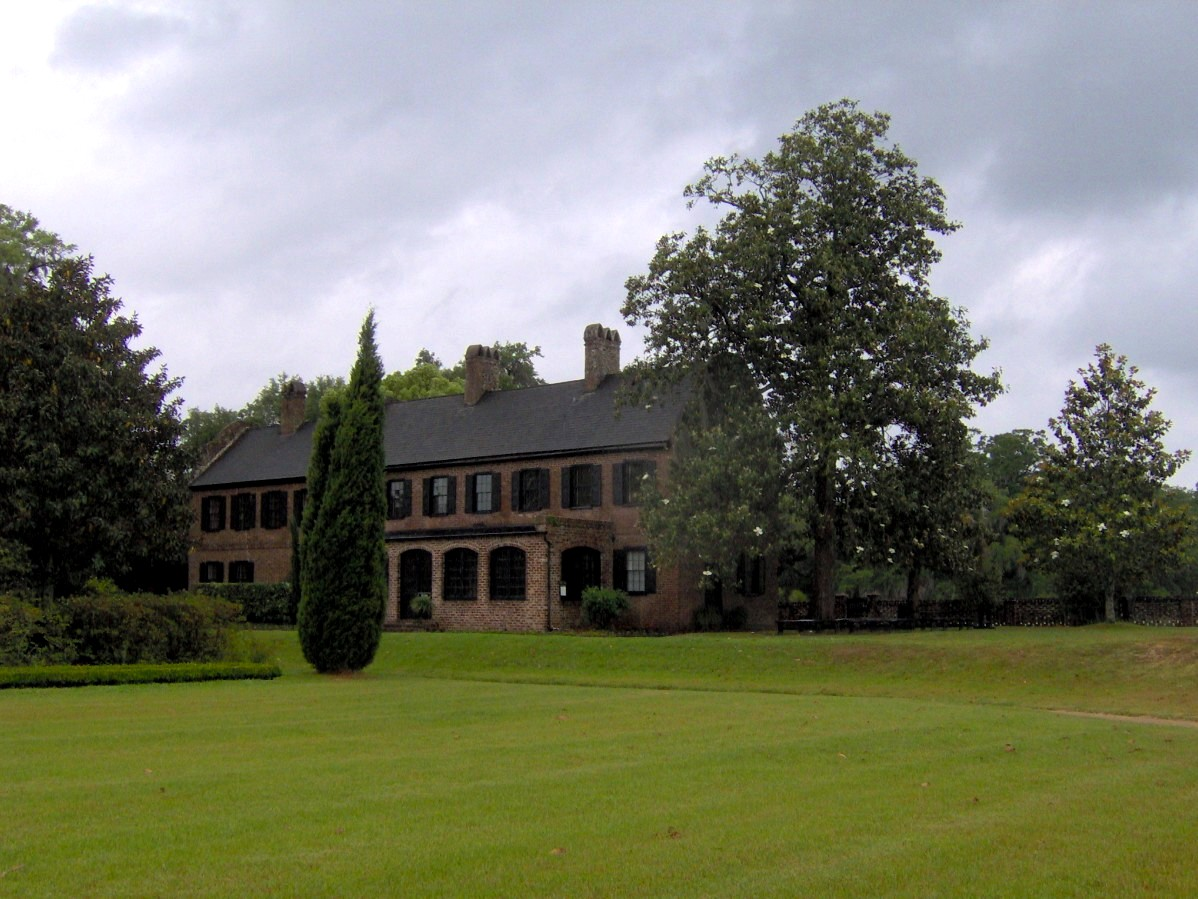
Middleton Place

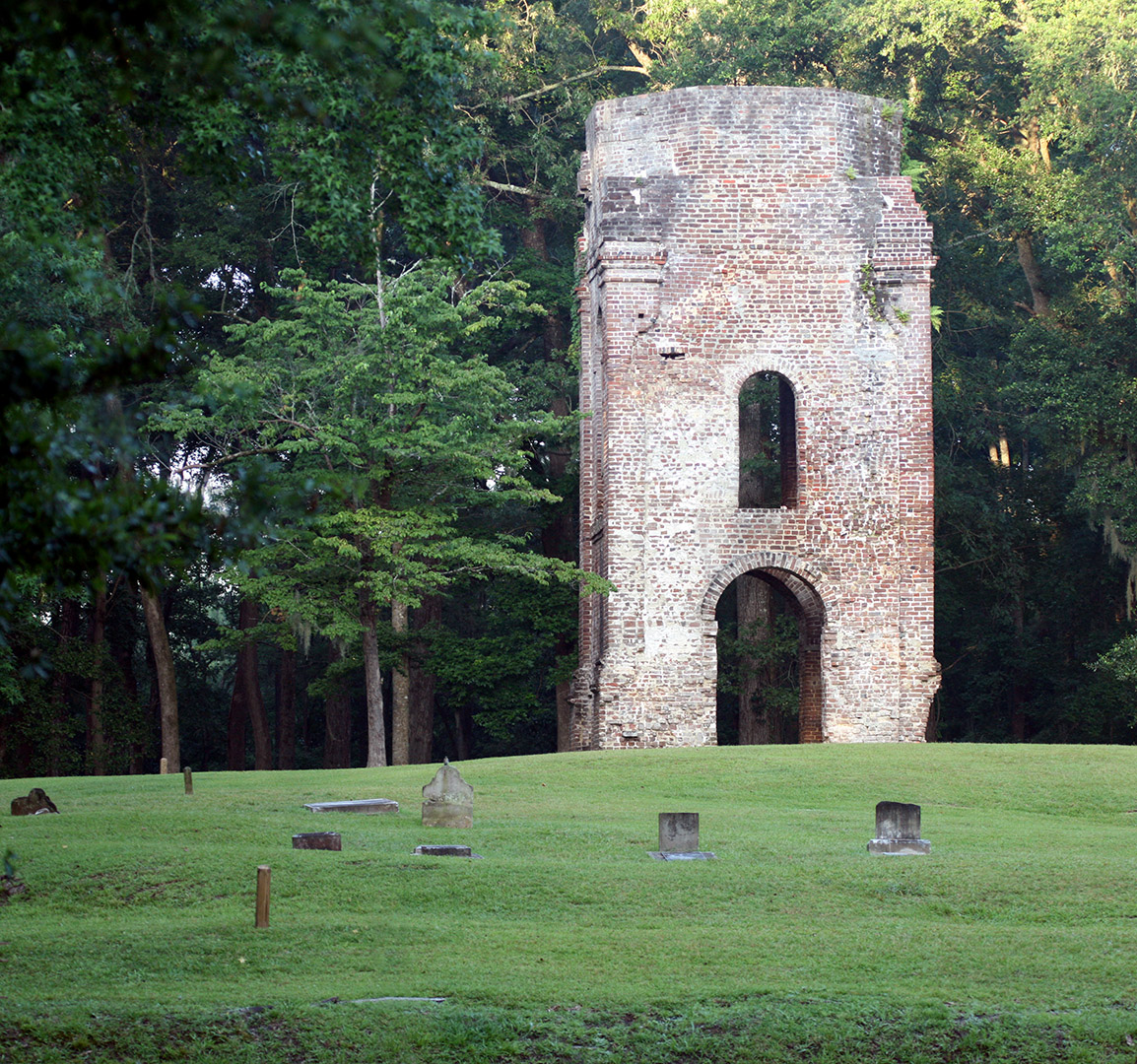
Ruins of the St. George Bell Tower at Old Dorchester
