= Point South, South Carolina =

Unincorporated community in South Carolina, US

Coordinates: 32.6314°N 80.8788°W

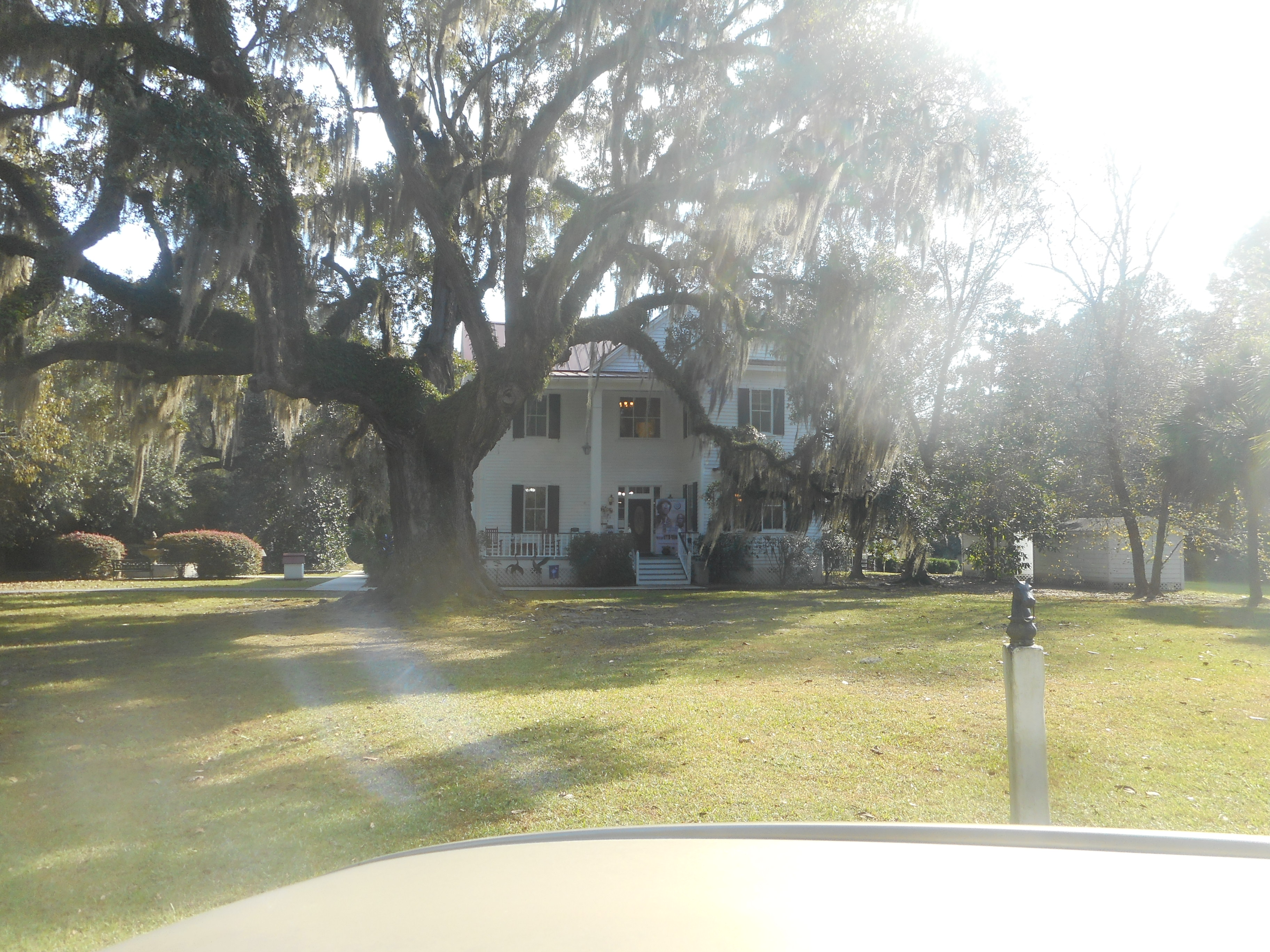
The historic John Edward Frampton Plantation house, now the Lowcountry Visitor Center and Museum

Point South is an unincorporated community located in Jasper County, South Carolina, United States near the borders of Beaufort and Hampton counties and close to the geographic center of the Lowcountry. It is centered on the junction of Interstate 95 and U.S. Route 17. It was developed partially by the Sea Pines Company in the 1960s and 1970s to help attract visitors to the Hilton Head region.

Point South is a major exit point along Interstate 95 in the state, as many motorists traveling to the Beaufort and Charleston areas exit the interstate onto U.S. Route 17 at this location. As a result, there are several lodging, dining, and fuel locations at the exit. The Lowcountry Council of Governments has its offices in Point South, and the Lowcountry Tourism Board's primary visitor center is located in the area. Point South businesses carry Yemassee addresses.
