= McKinley Washington Jr. =

American politician (1936–2022)

The Reverend McKinley Washington Jr.

Member of the South Carolina Senate from the 45th district
- In office 1990–2000
- Preceded by: Peden B. McLeod
- Succeeded by: Clementa C. Pinckney

Member of the South Carolina House of Representatives from the 116th district
- In office 1975–1990
- Preceded by: n/a
- Succeeded by: Curtis B. Inabinett

Personal details
- Born: August 8, 1936 Mayesville, South Carolina, U.S.
- Died: July 24, 2022 (aged 85)
- Party: Democratic
- Spouse: Beulah
- Children: 2
- Education: Johnson C. Smith University
- Occupation: Politician, Presbyterian minister

McKinley Washington Jr. (August 8, 1936 – July 24, 2022) was an American politician and pastor in the state of South Carolina.

== Early life, education and clergy work ==
Washington received his bachelor's degree from Johnson C. Smith University and his master's degree in divinity from Johnson C. Smith Theological Seminary. He was the pastor of the Edisto Presbyterian Church in Edisto Beach, South Carolina.

== Political career ==
Washington served in the South Carolina House of Representatives from 1975 to 1990 and in the South Carolina Senate from 1990 to 2000.

== Death ==
Washington died on July 24, 2022. Governor Henry McMaster announced that flags would be lowered in the late Senator's honor. On July 29, 2022, Executive Order 2022-24 was filed for that purpose.

== Legacy ==
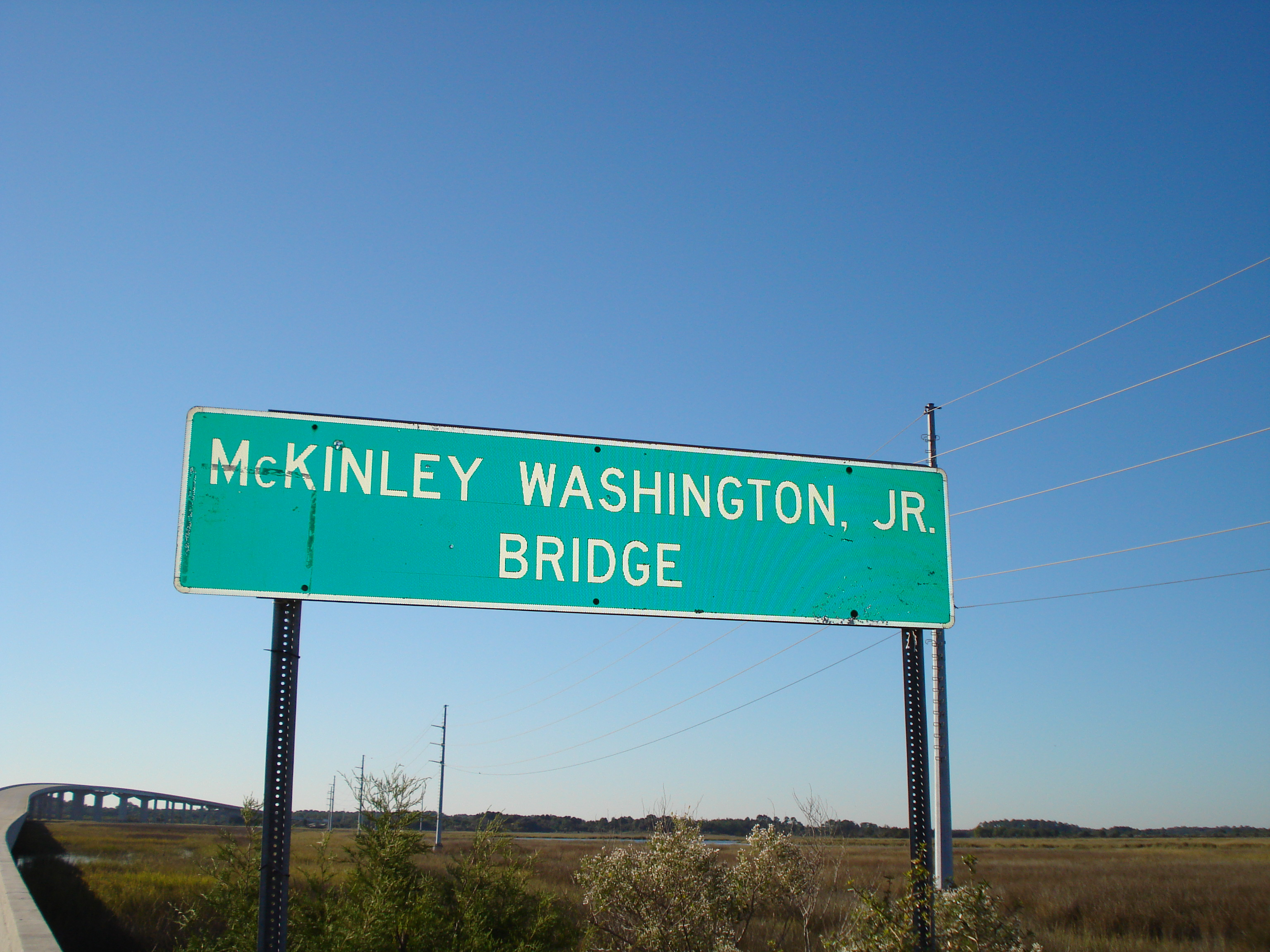
McKinley Washington, Jr. Bridge Highway sign, Edisto Island National Scenic Byway - NARA

In 1992, the bridge on South Carolina Highway 174 over the Dawho River, (also known as the South Edisto River), in Charleston County was named the McKinley Washington, Jr. Bridge in honor of the distinguished service that Senator Washington has given to the district in which he has served and to the State.
