= South Carolina Highway 172 =

State highway in South Carolina, United States

South Carolina Highway 172

Route information
- Maintained by SCDOT
- Length: 9.000 mi (14.484 km)

Major junctions
- West end: US 178 near North
- US 21 near St. Matthews
- East end: SC 6 near St. Matthews

Location
- Country: United States
- State: South Carolina
- Counties: Orangeburg, Calhoun

Highway system
- South Carolina State Highway System; Interstate; US; State; Scenic
| ← SC 171 | → SC 173 |

South Carolina Highway 172 (SC 172) is a nine-point-zero-zero-zero-mile-long (14.484 km) state highway in the U.S. state of South Carolina. The highway travels through rural areas of Orangeburg and Calhoun counties.

== Route description ==
SC 172 begins at an intersection with U.S. Route 178 (US 178; North Road) east-northeast of North, within Orangeburg County. It travels to the north-northeast. Approximately 1,000 feet (300 m) later, it meets the eastern terminus of SC 692, with SC 172 heading to the east-northeast before it enters Calhoun County. It passes by the Do-Little Field airport just before it meets US 21 (Columbia Road). SC 172 continues another 0.09 miles (0.14 km) to end at SC 6 (Caw Caw Road).

== Major intersections ==
| County | Location | mi | km | Destinations | Notes |
|---|---|---|---|---|---|
| Orangeburg | | 0.000 | 0.000 | US 178 (North Road) – Orangeburg, North, Aiken | Western terminus |
| Orangeburg | | 0.230 | 0.370 | SC 692 west (Redmond Mill Road) – Swansea | Eastern terminus of SC 692 |
| Calhoun | | 8.910 | 14.339 | US 21 (Columbia Road) – Orangeburg, Swansea, Columbia | |
| Calhoun | | 9.000 | 14.484 | SC 6 (Caw Caw Road) to I-26 – St. Matthews | Eastern terminus |
1.000 mi = 1.609 km; 1.000 km = 0.621 mi
