= South Carolina Highway 171 =

Highway in South Carolina

South Carolina Highway 171

Route information
- Maintained by SCDOT
- Length: 12.560 mi (20.213 km)
- Tourist routes: SC Heritage Corridor: Discovery Route

Major junctions
- South end: Arctic Avenue in Folly Beach
- US 17 in Charleston
- East end: SC 7 in Charleston

Location
- Country: United States
- State: South Carolina
- Counties: Charleston

Highway system
- South Carolina State Highway System; Interstate; US; State; Scenic
| ← SC 170 | → SC 172 |

South Carolina Highway 171 (SC 171) is a 12.560-mile (20.213 km) state highway located entirely within Charleston County in the U.S. state of South Carolina. The highway travels from Folly Beach north to SC 7 in Charleston; it is the only road connecting Folly Island to the South Carolina mainland. SC 171 is maintained by the South Carolina Department of Transportation.

== Route description ==
SC 171 begins at an intersection with Arctic Avenue in Folly Beach; the Folly Beach Fishing Pier and the Atlantic Ocean lie to the south. The route heads north-northwest through Folly Beach's business district as Center Street. From here, the highway crosses the Folly River onto Long Island; this crossing is the only road connecting Folly Island to the rest of South Carolina. The road passes several homes before crossing to James Island, where it turns to the north as Folly Road. After crossing James Island Creek, the highway meets the southern terminus of SC 30, also known as the James Island Connector. Past this junction, SC 171 intersects the eastern terminus of SC 700 before crossing Wappoo Creek to leave James Island. The highway heads through a mainly residential area to intersect U.S. Route 17; shortly thereafter, the route meets SC 61, and the two routes head west-northwest concurrently. After passing through a business district for 1.6 miles (2.6 km) the two highways separate, and SC 171 again heads northward. The highway passes Charles Towne Landing, a state historic site and the location of the first permanent English settlement in the state, before merging into SC 7 at its northern terminus.

== Major intersections ==
The entire route is in Charleston County.

| Location | mi | km | Destinations | Notes |
|---|---|---|---|---|
| Folly Beach | 0.000 | 0.000 | Arctic Avenue | Southern terminus |
| Charleston | 6.980 | 11.233 | SC 30 east to SC 61 – Downtown Charleston | Western terminus of SC 30 |
| Charleston | 8.100 | 13.036 | SC 700 west (Maybank Highway) – Seabrook Island, Kiawah Island | Southern end of SC 700 concurrency |
| Charleston | 9.070 | 14.597 | SC 700 east (Folly Road Boulevard) to US 17 north | Northern end of SC 700 concurrency; no access to SC 700 east from SC 171 south |
| Charleston | 9.240 | 14.870 | US 17 (Savannah Highway) | |
| Charleston | 9.330 | 15.015 | SC 61 south to US 17 | Southern end of SC 61 concurrency |
| Charleston | 10.920 | 17.574 | SC 61 north (Ashley River Road) | Northern end of SC 61 concurrency |
| Charleston | 12.560 | 20.213 | SC 7 north (Sam Rittenberg Boulevard) | SC 171 north to SC 7 north and SC 7 south to SC 171 south only; northern terminus |
1.000 mi = 1.609 km; 1.000 km = 0.621 mi: Concurrency terminus; Incomplete access
