= Riverland Terrace =

Neighbourhood in Charleston, South Carolina, United States

Coordinates: 32.76194°N 79.99028°W

Riverland Terrace is a historic neighborhood in Charleston, South Carolina. It was first developed starting in 1925. It is one of James Island, South Carolina's oldest neighborhoods. The Terrace is located 10 minutes west of downtown Charleston along Wappoo Creek and the inland waterway. The neighborhood boasts a public boat landing, Charleston Municipal Golf Course, a playground, multiple restaurants and shops. Fort Pemberton (South Carolina) Park is within the neighborhood.

Edisto Realty Co. (a company owned by C. Bissell Jenkins and his three sons) announced its plans to immediately start laying plans for the development of 85 to 90 acres on James Island in October 1925. W.C. Wilbur & Co. was the real estate agency for the developer and offered special reduced pricing ($700 to $1750) on the original 229 lots for the first few weeks until November 10, 1925. The development included 13 commercial lots among the residential properties. The development did not follow a traditional grid layout but instead had winding streets. The development is bordered to the north by the Wappoo Cut, and two man-made lakes were created out of inlets from the Wappoo Cut.

The first houses were completed in May 1926.

Leading into the neighborhood is the historic Avenue of Oaks, consisting of 73 live oak trees believed to be over 100 years old. The avenue of oaks had been begun about 1910, and the developers completed the installation of the oaks during the landscaping of the neighborhood starting in 1925. In 2017, neighborhood residents had issues with the local electrical company cutting down trees unnecessarily.

The Terrace consists of approximately 800 homes. Fort Pemberton, a Civil War fortification built in 1862, remains today.

== Gallery ==
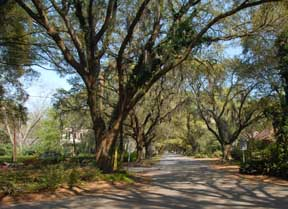
Oak trees over 100 years old line the entrance to Riverland Terrace

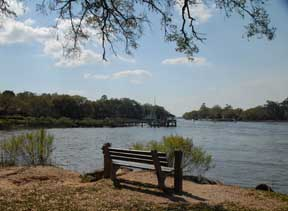
The Wappoo Cut which borders one side of neighborhood

Plymouth Park
