= South Carolina Highway 61 =

South Carolina Highway 61

Route information
- Maintained by SCDOT
- Length: 67.05 mi (107.91 km)
- Existed: 1923–present
- Tourist routes: Ashley River Road: SC Heritage Corridor: Discovery Route

Major junctions
- South end: SC 30 in Charleston
- US 17 in Charleston; SC 165 near Summerville; I-95 near Walterboro; US 21 near Branchville
- North end: US 78 near Branchville

Location
- Country: United States
- State: South Carolina
- Counties: Charleston, Dorchester, Colleton, Bamberg

Highway system
- South Carolina State Highway System; Interstate; US; State; Scenic
← SC 60	→ SC 63

South Carolina Highway 61 (SC 61) is a 67-mile-long (108 km) state highway in the U.S. state of South Carolina. The highway is designated on a north–south direction, but physically travels in an east–west direction, from SC 30 in Charleston to U.S. Route 78 (US 78) near Branchville. The portion of SC 61 from Church Creek Bridge and 10 miles (16 km) north is designated a National Scenic Byway.

== Route description ==
=== St. Andrew's Boulevard ===
The easternmost section of SC 61 is named St. Andrew's Boulevard. This section travels from US 17 to SC 171. It is mostly residential buildings that have been rezoned commercial.

=== Ashley River Road ===
Ashley River Road
- Location: Charleston and Dorchester counties

Ashley River Road is the portion of SC 61 that travels through Charleston near the Ashley River from SC 171 to SC 165. It is four lanes near Sam Rittenberg Boulevard, but becomes two lanes through the scenic stretch. Along the two-lane stretch, there are many large oaks and historic plantations. The SC 61/Ashley River Road exit from Interstate 526 (I-526) actually exits onto SC 461 (Paul Cantrell Boulevard).

Points of interest along Ashley River Road:

- Drayton Hall
- Magnolia Plantation and Gardens and the Audubon Swamp Garden
- Middleton Place Plantation
- Shadowmoss Plantation - Golf Club & Residential
- MacLaura Hall - Private Residential

=== Beech Hill Road ===
Beech Hill Road is the section of SC 61 that travels from SC 165 to US 17A. The Legend Oaks Plantation is south of this section of highway.

=== Augusta Highway ===
Augusta Highway is the longest section of SC 61 from US 17A to the westernmost end of SC 61 where it merges into US 78.

== National Register of Historic Places ==
- Ashley River Road
- U.S. National Register of Historic Places
- U.S. Historic district – Contributing property
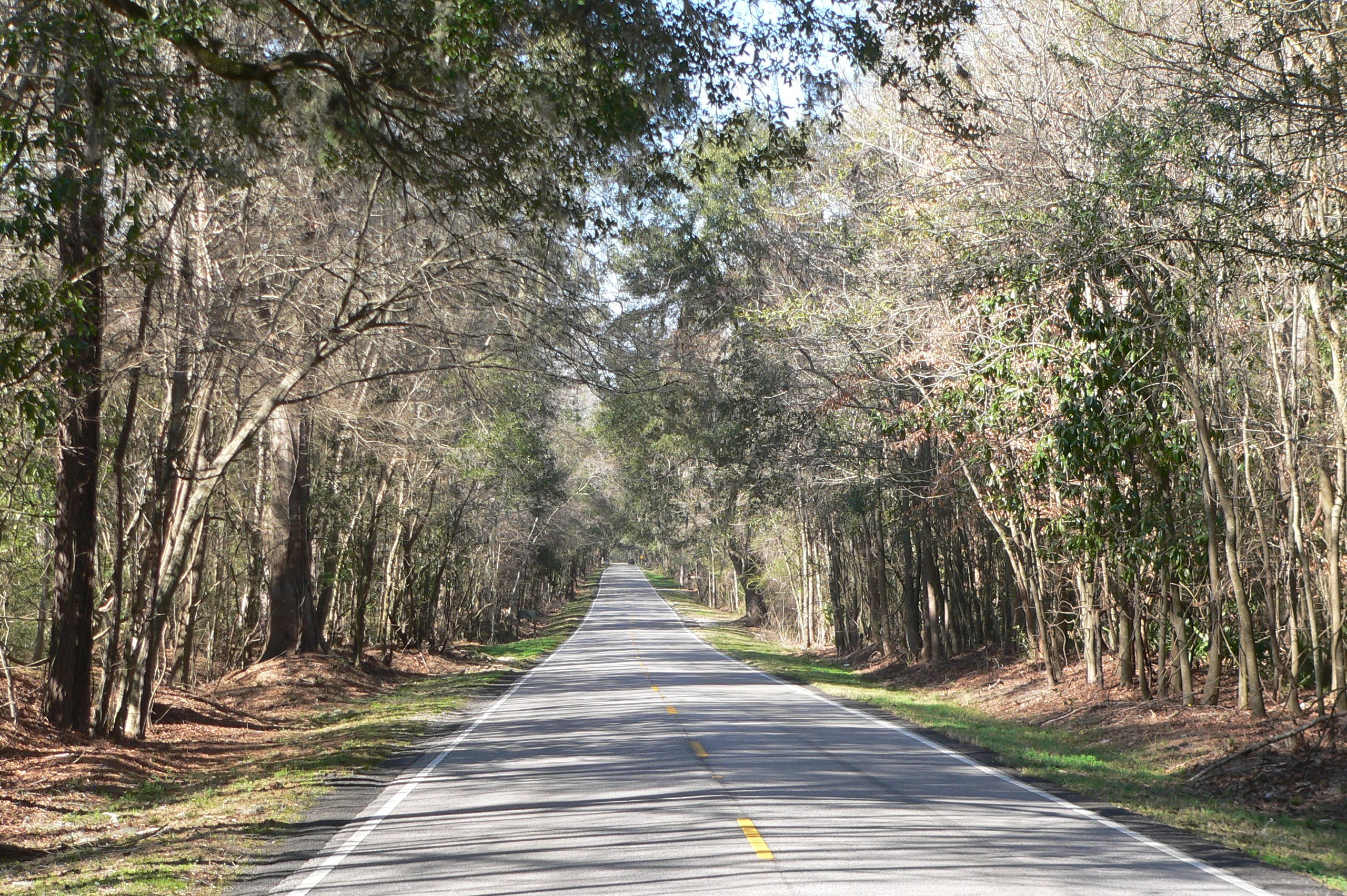
- Ashley River Road 2.9 mi N of Bees Ferry Rd 2

- Location within South Carolina Location within the United States
- Nearest city: Summerville, South Carolina
- Area: 95 acres (38 ha)
- Built: 1691
- Part of: Ashley River Historic District (ID93001514)
- NRHP reference No.: 83003831
- Added to NRHP: November 21, 1983

Some or all of Ashley River Road was named to the National Register of Historic Places in 1983. In 1993, it was included in the Ashley River Historic District.

== History ==
=== South Carolina Highway 65 ===
South Carolina Highway 65
- Location: Bamberg County–Dorchester County, South Carolina
- Existed: 1929–1952

South Carolina Highway 65 (SC 65) was a state highway that existed in the southeastern part of Bamberg County, the northern part of Colleton County, and the southern part of Dorchester County. It was established in 1929 from U.S. Route 78 (US 78; now Farrells Road) in Farrells Crossroads to SC 64 southeast of Givhans. It was also proposed to continue to the southeast to meet SC 61 (now SC 165 Connector). In 1932, the proposed portion was shifted to the northeast, to follow SC 64 across the Ashley River and then southeast to meet SC 61 (now SC 165 south of Summerville. In 1933, the highway was extended northwest and north-northwest, following US 78 until they met the U.S. Highway's new routing west-southwest of Branchville. Also, its proposed path near Summerville was completed. In December 1950, it was rerouted onto its 1929 path, replacing SC 650 to end at SC 61 (now SC 165 Conn.) in Cooks Crossroads. The portion of the former path not concurrent with SC 64 was redesignated as SC 642. In 1952, SC 65 was redesignated as SC 61.

== Future ==
Developers continue to build more homes further and further down Ashley River Road. A great deal of controversy was created about overdevelopment when the City of North Charleston annexed the 6,600-acre tract known as Watson Hill. The tract was sold by MeadWestvaco to private developers who then requested the annexation by North Charleston. The town of Summerville tried to rush an annexation to block North Charleston which ended in a court battle. Summerville later rescinded and backed away from its annexation attempt. The slump in the economy, 2008–2010, forced these developers to sell and the property was repurchased by MeadWestvaco.

A recent public meeting suggested that if development is to occur, instead of widening Ashley River Road to alleviate congestion, Glenn McConnell Parkway, also known as SC 461, could be extended beyond its terminus at Bees Ferry Road. This is possible since Glenn McConnell Parkway travels parallel to SC 61.

== Major intersections ==
County	Location	mi	km	Destinations	Notes
Charleston	Charleston	0.000	0.000	SC 30 (James Island Expressway) – Folly Beach, Calhoun Street	Southern terminus; SC 30 exit 1
Charleston	Charleston	0.800– 0.839	1.287– 1.350	US 17 (Savannah Highway)	Access from SC 61 to US 17 / from US 17 south to SC 61 north only; interchange
Charleston	Charleston	1.070	1.722	SC 171 south (Wesley Drive)	Southern end of SC 171 concurrency
Charleston	Charleston	2.660	4.281	SC 171 north (St. Andrews Boulevard / Old Towne Boulevard) to I-26	Northern end of SC 171 concurrency
Charleston	Charleston	4.080	6.566	SC 7 (Sam Rittenberg Boulevard)	
Charleston	Charleston	4.560	7.339	SC 61 Conn. begins	Southern end of SC 61 Conn. concurrency; southern terminus of SC 61 Conn.
Charleston	Charleston	4.650	7.483	SC 461 north (Paul Cantrell Boulevard)	Southern terminus of SC 461
Charleston	Charleston	4.730	7.612	SC 61 Conn. ends	Northern end of SC 61 Conn. concurrency; northern terminus of SC 61 Conn.
Dorchester		19.230	30.948	Cook's Cross Road north (SC 61 Conn. north)	Southern terminus of SC 61 Conn. and Cook's Cross Road
Dorchester	Cooks Crossroads	19.470	31.334	SC 165 (Bacons Bridge Road north / Delemar Highway south) – Ravenel, Summerville	
Dorchester		24.039	38.687	US 17 Alt. north – Summerville	Southern end of US 17 Alt. concurrency
Dorchester		24.446	39.342	US 17 Alt. south – Walterboro	Northern end of US 17 Alt. concurrency
Dorchester	Givhans	29.390	47.299	SC 27 north (Givhans Road) – Ridgeville	Southern terminus of SC 27
Colleton		39.710	63.907	SC 651 south (Rehoboth Road)	Northern terminus of SC 651
Colleton	Canadys	46.900	75.478	US 15 (Jefferies Highway) – Walterboro, St. George	
Colleton		49.740– 49.741	80.049– 80.050	I-95 – Florence, Savannah	I-95 exit 68
Colleton		53.420	85.971	SC 217 south (Sunrise Road) – Smoaks	Northern terminus of SC 217
Bamberg	Whetstone Crossroads	60.640	97.591	US 21 (Freedom Road) – Branchville, Beaufort	
Bamberg		66.840	107.569	US 78 Conn. north – Branchville	Southern terminus of US 78 Conn.
Bamberg		67.050	107.907	US 78 (Heritage Highway) – Aiken, Bamberg, Branchville	Access to / from US 78 east via unsigned US 78 Conn.
1.000 mi = 1.609 km; 1.000 km = 0.621 mi: Concurrency terminus; Incomplete access

== Special routes ==
=== Charleston alternate route ===
South Carolina Highway 61 Alternate
- Location: Charleston, South Carolina
- Existed: 1940–1947

South Carolina Highway 61 Alternate (SC 61 Alt.) was an alternate route that existed west of Charleston, in what is now the West Ashley portion of the city. It was established in 1940 on Wappoo Road between U.S. Route 17 (US 17) and SC 61. In 1947, it was decommissioned.

=== Charleston connector route ===
South Carolina Highway 61 Connector
- Location: Charleston, South Carolina
- Length: 0.163 mi (262 m)

South Carolina Highway 61 Connector (SC 61 Conn.) is a connector route in the West Ashley portion of Charleston. It is actually the SC 61 mainline. On the South Carolina Department of Transportation's Charleston city map, the portion of SC 61 on either side of the SC 461 (Paul Cantrell Boulevard) intersection is signed as a connector route.

=== Dorchester County connector route ===
South Carolina Highway 61 Connector
- Location: Dorchester County, South Carolina
- Length: 0.272 mi (438 m)

South Carolina Highway 61 Connector (SC 61 Conn.) is a connecting route south-southwest of Summerville and is in the southeastern part of Dorchester County. This highway serves to connect SC 61 and SC 165. It is known as Cook's Cross Road and is an unsigned highway.

It begins at an intersection with the SC 61 mainline (Ashley River Road) just southeast of Cooks Crossroads, which is the intersection of SC 61 and SC 165. It travels to the north and curves to the northwest. After a curve to the north-northwest, it curves back to the northwest and reaches its northern terminus, an intersection with SC 165.

=== Summerville alternate route ===
South Carolina Highway 61 Alternate
- Location: Summerville, South Carolina
- Existed: 1936–1947

South Carolina Highway 61 Alternate (SC 61 Alt.) was an alternate route that existed south of Summerville. It was established in December 1936 on Stallsville Loop between two intersections with SC 61 (now SC 165). In 1947, it was decommissioned. Its west–east portion in now still Stallsville Loop, but its south–north portion is part of Trolley Road.
