= South Carolina Highway 30 =

State freeway in South Carolina

South Carolina Highway 30
- James Island Expressway; James Island Connector
- SC 30 highlighted in red

Route information
- Maintained by SCDOT
- Length: 3.050 mi (4.908 km)
- Existed: 1996–present

Major junctions
- South end: SC 171 in Charleston
- SC 61 in Charleston
- North end: US 17 in Charleston

Location
- Country: United States
- State: South Carolina
- Counties: Charleston

Highway system
- South Carolina State Highway System; Interstate; US; State; Scenic
← US 29	→ SC 31

South Carolina Highway 30 (SC 30, also known as the James Island Expressway or the James Island Connector) is a 3.050-mile-long (4.908 km) freeway in Charleston, South Carolina. The freeway travels from SC 171 on James Island to U.S. Route 17 (US 17) in downtown Charleston.

== Route description ==
SC 30 begins at SC 171 on James Island at exit 3. The interchange consists of a half-diamond interchange. From there, the highway runs northeast, and has two interchanges south of the Ashley River crossing. Exit 2 has access to Harbor View Road and exit 1 is for the Herbert U. Fielding Connector (SC 61).

The route is an orphaned segment of Interstate 526 (I-526). Approximately seven miles (11 km) separate the eastern terminus of SC 30 from the eastern terminus of I-526's current extent. Mileage markers and exit numbers on both SC 30 and I-526 are based on an eventual merging of the routes: with miles 1 to 3 occurring on SC 30 and miles 10 to 30 used on the current I-526 route.

=== Robert B. Scarborough Bridge ===
Robert B. Scarborough Bridge
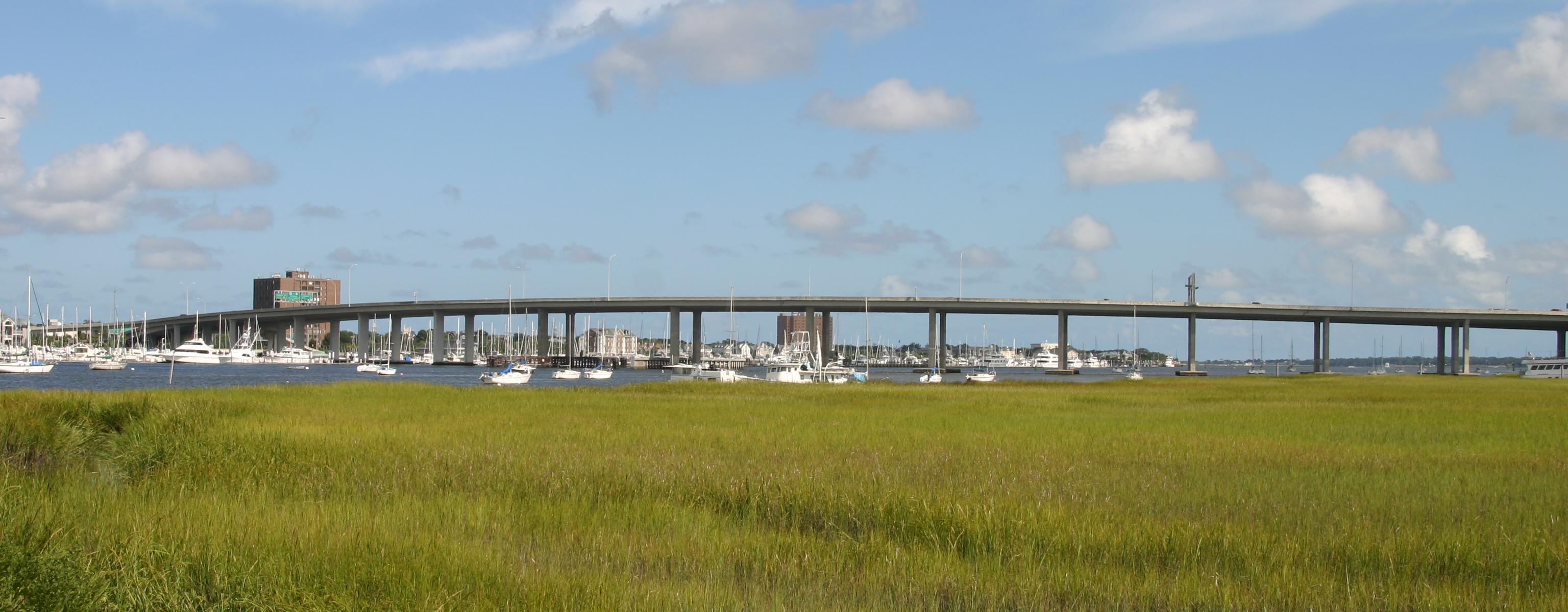
- Coordinates: 32°46′46″N 79°57′26″W
- Crosses: Ashley River and Intracoastal Waterway
- Official name: Robert B. Scarborough Bridge
- ID number: 001040003000100

Characteristics
- Design: concrete box girder
- Total length: 3322.3 m
- Width: 24.4 m
- Clearance below: 20.4 m

History
- Opened: September 4, 1993; 31 years ago

The bridge across the Ashley River is named the Robert B. Scarborough Bridge, named for a former state legislator and highway commissioner. The bridge is 2.9 miles (4.7 km) long and cost $124.7 million to build. The bridge also crosses Wappoo Creek, which is a part of the Intracoastal Waterway.

== History ==
The original SC 30 traveled from St. George to Beaufort. In 1926, SC 39 was extended north with SC 4 from Santee to Summerton on a new route to Sumter, replaced SC 42 north to Bishopville, east with SC 34 to Lydia, then replaced SC 351 north to Hartsville, then northeast on a new route through Society Hill to Bennettsville, then replaced SC 38 northeast to the North Carolina state line at McColl. In 1927, it was truncated to Walterboro, as parts were transferred to US 17 and SC 28 (this segment is now part of US 21). The remainder became part of US 401 in 1933.

SC 30 was reused in 1935 as a renumbering of SC 15 from US 221 in Watts Mills to SC 92 near Cross Anchor. In 1956, this became part of an extended SC 49.

The current route was proposed as early as the 1960s to provide a second and more direct connection between James Island and downtown Charleston. It opened on September 4, 1993, and provided a route off the island that did not require crossing a drawbridge. The route was studied as a toll road in the 1960s, but it was determined that there was not sufficient traffic demand to fund the route and the bridge entirely by tolls.

== Future ==
The proposed missing section of I-526 was the subject of an environmental study that was completed in early 2014. Various alternative routings and options are being reviewed, but the general plan is to extend south from US 17 to Johns Island and then east to James Island, where it will connect with SC 30 (possibly renumbering it). Some alternatives shown include the possibility that it will be built in expressway grade instead, falling short of being labeled an Interstate Highway.

Citing Charleston County's inability to provide funds to cover the project's increased cost, the State Transportation Infrastructure Bank (SIB) board voted on May 26, 2016, to abandon the proposed extension of I-526 across James and Johns Islands.

In 2021, SCDOT revived the 526-extension project. As of May 2023, they are aiming to start construction by 2025. In December 2023, the South Carolina Joint Bond Review Committee approved the state's Transportation Infrastructure Bank's action Tuesday afternoon of providing $75 million for preliminary costs in the project, which is dubbed the Mark Clark Extension Project.

== Exit list ==
The entire route is in Charleston, Charleston County.

mi	km	Exit	Destinations	Notes
0.000	0.000		SC 171 (Folly Road) – Folly Beach	
0.790	1.271	2	Harbor View Road	
2.240– 2.523	3.605– 4.060	1	SC 61 west – Summerville	Eastern terminus of SC 61
2.694– 2.699	4.336– 4.344	Robert B. Scarborough Bridge over Ashley River		
2.720	4.377		Lockwood Drive / Calhoun Street	
3.050	4.908		US 17 (Spring Street / Savannah Highway) / Lockwood Drive	Interchange
1.000 mi = 1.609 km; 1.000 km = 0.621 mi
