= U.S. Route 17 in South Carolina =

Section of U.S. Highway in South Carolina, United States

U.S. Highway 17
- Coastal Highway
- US 17 highlighted in red

Route information
- Maintained by SCDOT
- Length: 221.454 mi (356.396 km)
- Existed: November 11, 1926–present

Major junctions
- South end: US 17 / SR 404 Spur at the Georgia state line near Savannah, GA
- I-95 in Hardeeville; US 321 in Hardeeville; US 278 from Hardeeville to Ridgeland; I-95 from Ridgeland to Point South; US 17 Alt. / US 21 near Poctaligo; I-526 in Charleston; I-26 in Charleston; I-526 / I-526 BS in Mount Pleasant; US 17 Alt. / US 521 / US 701 in Georgetown; US 501 in Myrtle Beach
- North end: US 17 at the North Carolina state line near Calabash, NC

Location
- Country: United States
- State: South Carolina
- Counties: Jasper, Beaufort, Colleton, Charleston, Georgetown, Horry

Highway system
- United States Numbered Highway System; List; Special; Divided; South Carolina State Highway System; Interstate; US; State; Scenic
| ← SC 16 | → SC 18 |

U.S. Highway 17 (US 17) is a part of the United States Numbered Highway System that runs north–south from Punta Gorda, Florida to Winchester, Virginia. In South Carolina, it is a 221-mile (356 km) major highway that travels near the Atlantic Ocean. Beginning from the Georgia state line on the Little Back River near Savannah, Georgia, US 17 enters South Carolina in Jasper County, where it intersects with Interstate 95 (I-95). The route goes through Hardeeville. It merges with I-95 until Point South, then heads east into Beaufort County, through the ACE Basin, and eventually reaches Charleston. There, US 17 crosses the Ashley and Cooper rivers, crossing the Arthur Ravenel Jr. Bridge and becoming a major route through Mount Pleasant. Continuing through the Francis Marion National Forest, it reaches Georgetown. Then it follows the Grand Strand, bypassing Myrtle Beach before entering North Carolina near Calabash.

Throughout its route in South Carolina, the highway is commonly called the Coastal Highway. Historically, a portion of US 17 was part of a much longer colonial-era route known as the King's Highway. This historic road stretched from Charleston to Boston, Massachusetts, serving the major colonial cities along the Eastern Seaboard. Additionally, multiple portions of US 17 were part of the Ocean Highway, due to the highway being near the Atlantic Ocean.

US 17 existed before the Interstate Highway System and remains an alternative to I-95 for local and long-distance travel. The highway offers a more scenic coastal route than I-95's inland path. During hurricane seasons, US 17 serves as an evacuation route for coastal communities, particularly in the Grand Strand regions.

== Route description ==
US 17 runs for 221.454 miles (356.396 km) from the South Carolina Lowcountry to the Pee Dee region. The route primarily follows a more northeast–southwest direction. Most of the corridor runs through coastal areas, marshes and wetlands, urban areas, and rural farmland. US 17 is mostly four lanes except from Garr Lane in Hardeeville to State Road S-27-13 near Ridgeland. Between Ridgeland and Point South, US 17 runs concurrently with I-95. The highway is maintained by the South Carolina Department of Transportation (SCDOT).

=== Georgia state line to Charleston ===
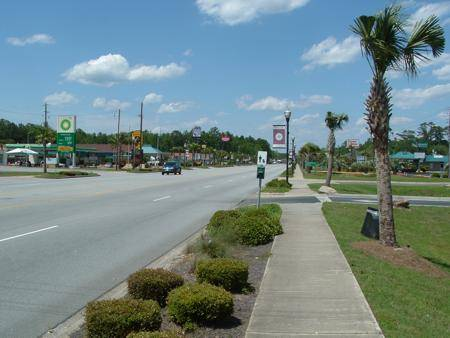
US 17 in Hardeeville

US 17 enters South Carolina in Jasper County as a four-lane divided highway and, within eight miles (13 km), enters Hardeeville, where it becomes a four-lane configuration. US 17 intersects I-95 at exit 5 in Hardeeville and after the intersection with US 321, runs parallel to I-95 until Ridgeland, where it merges with the Interstate at exit 22 until Point South. At Point South, US 17 leaves I-95 at exit 33 and heads eastward into northern Beaufort County, sharing a concurrency with US 21 until Gardens Corner. US 21 splits off to Beaufort while US 17 heads northeast into the ACE Basin and Colleton County. Once in Jacksonboro, the road enters into Charleston County crossing over the Edisto River. The road passes through several rural communities as it approaches Charleston from the west. Just before the interchange with I-526, major commercial development starts and continues into the West Ashley neighborhood of Charleston. The route then approaches the Ashley River.

=== Charleston to Georgetown ===
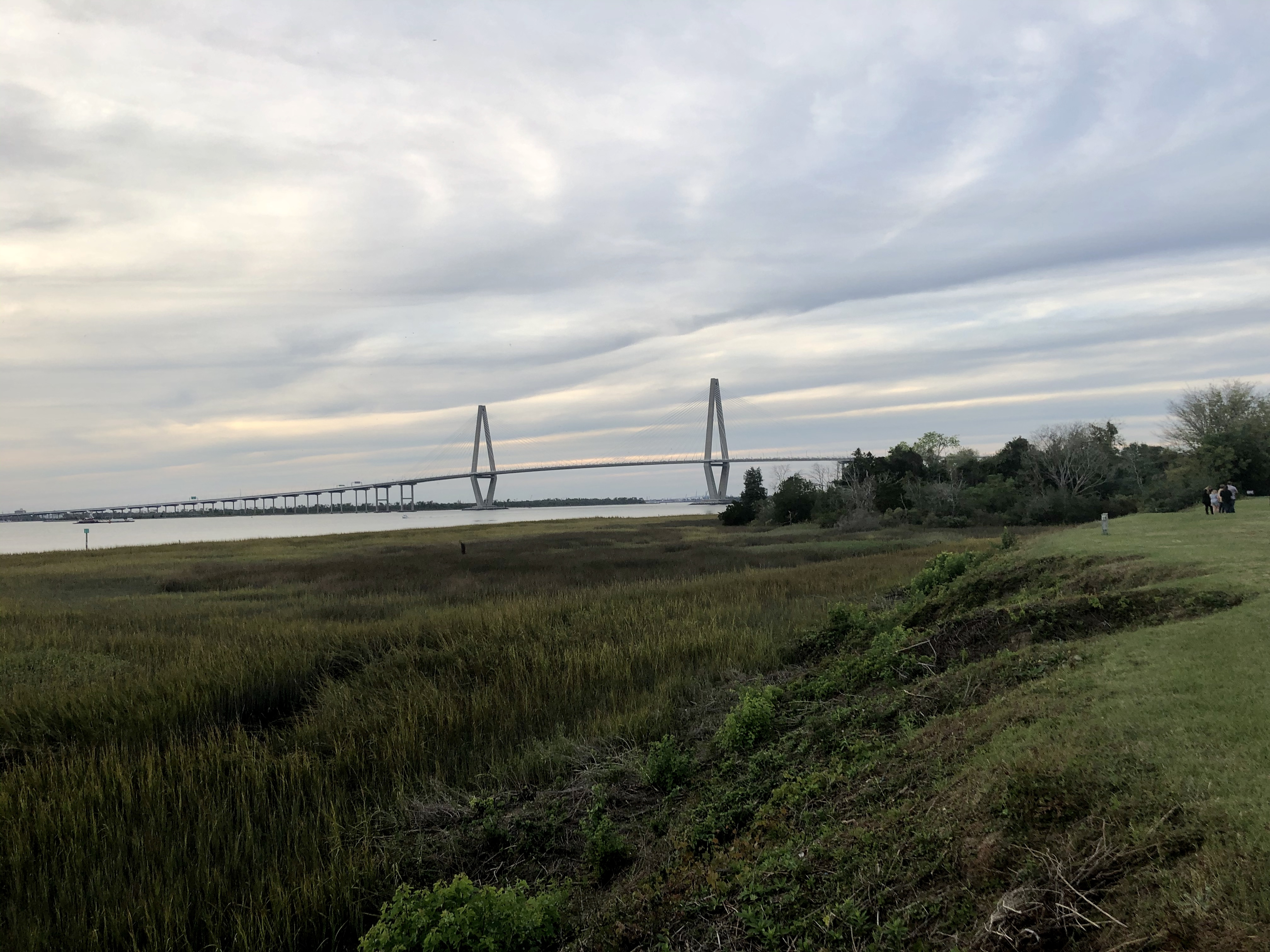
The Arthur Ravenel Jr. Bridge carries US 17 over the Cooper River

In Charleston, US 17 traverses the Ashley River Drawbridges and comes onto the Charleston Peninsula, being routed north of the city's historical areas. The first portion is at-grade and has a few traffic signals for flow purposes. Upon reaching the eastern terminus of I-26, US 17 becomes controlled-access and above grade as it approaches the Cooper River via the Arthur Ravenel Jr. Bridge and the stretch of US 17 in Charleston is infamous among locals for its traffic congestion, especially on weekday mornings.

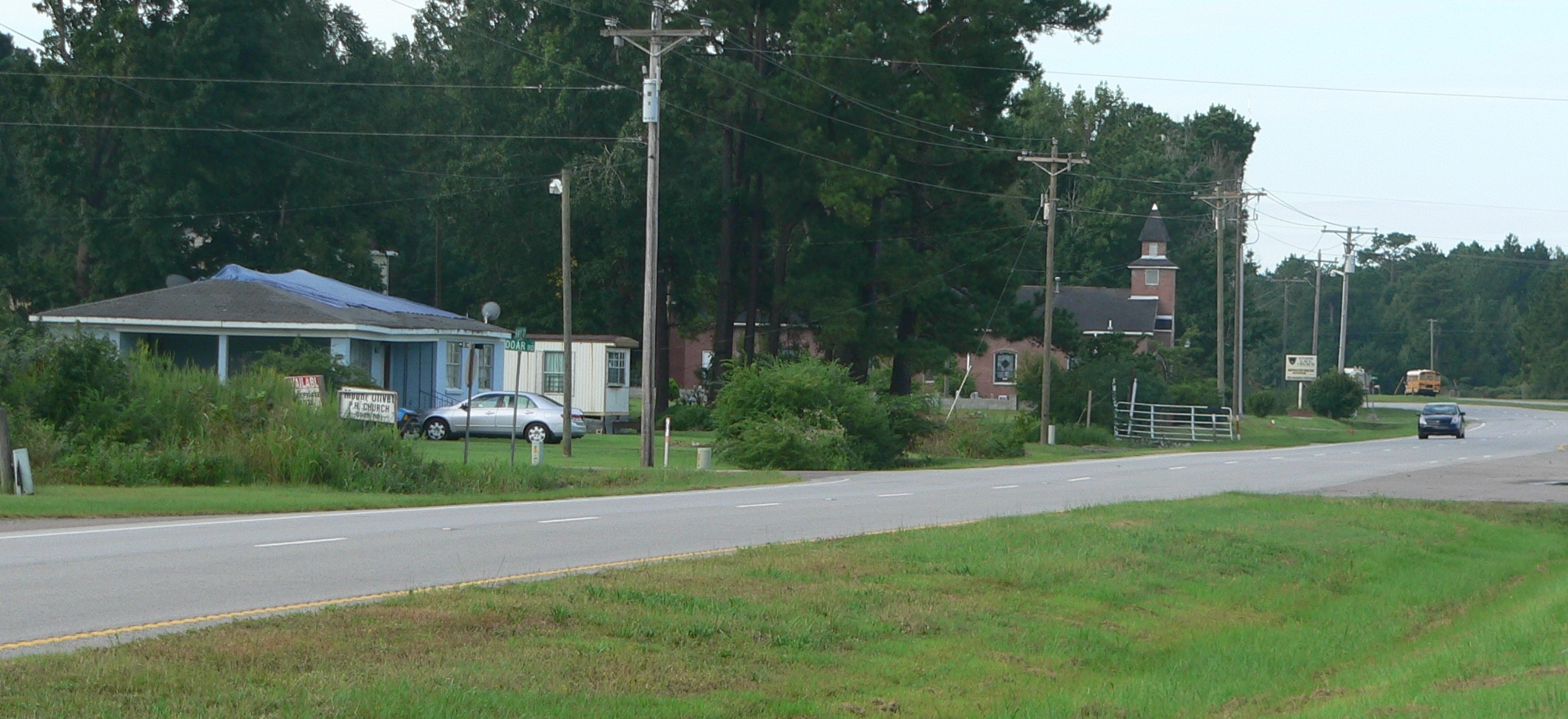
US 17 near Awendaw Creek

Upon crossing the river, the highway enters Mount Pleasant at grade and is signalized for several miles up through the second interchange with I-526 and connecting roads to the Isle of Palms and Sullivan's Island. The road leaves the Charleston metropolitan area by entering the Francis Marion National Forest and going through the rural communities of Awendaw and McClellanville on its northeastern journey to Georgetown. US 17 crosses the marsh-lined Santee River as it enters Georgetown County. After going through Georgetown, US 17 crosses eastward over the Waccamaw–Pee Dee river system before making a northward turn along the Grand Strand.

=== Georgetown to the North Carolina state line ===
The last component of US 17 in South Carolina runs close to the Atlantic Ocean, beginning at Hobcaw Barony and DeBordieu Colony, passing by Pawleys Island, and going past the Litchfield beaches and Murrells Inlet. It enters Horry County. It passes Garden City, Surfside Beach, and arrives in Myrtle Beach. US 17 splits here between a business route and the standard route, which remains west of the beach and tourist areas served by US 17 Business. The roads rejoin north of the city and continue as US 17 through Atlantic Beach, North Myrtle Beach, and Little River where the South Carolina Welcome Center can be found across from the intersection with SC 179 before crossing into North Carolina. The portions from Murrells Inlet to the state line are quite congested at times, though the soon to be constructed I-73 should assist in alleviating many traffic issues.

== History ==
US 17 South Carolina highway shield in 1926.

The route was part of the 1926 approved plan for a national system of highways and appears on the approved map. When first signed, US 17 followed a route that went through Florence and Marion. The original route through South Carolina was 288 miles (463 km) long.

At the time, U.S. Highways in South Carolina used a dual-numbering system; US 17 was also signed SC 1 from Georgia to Yemassee, SC 30 from Yemassee to Walterboro, SC 6 from Walterboro to Charleston, SC 2 from Charleston to Goose Creek, SC 41 from Goose Creek to Florence, SC 3 from Florence to North Carolina. By 1928, all the dual numbers had been removed except for SC 2. The entire route from Georgia to North Carolina was paved by 1930. At one point, the route from Green Pond to Jacksonboro was SC 32.

In 1931, the route was extended to Punta Gorda.

The early routing was already identified to be shifted to the King's Highway which would pass through Myrtle Beach and Georgetown; rerouting occurred in 1935.

In 1941, the segment of roadway between the Tullifinny River and Harbor River was widened to four lanes.

In 1947, US 17 was relocated to stay onto King Street and Columbus Street in Charleston.

In 1952, a one-way pair was created in Charleston near the Ashley River Bridge. By 1959, this had been modified again to use Spring Street.

In 1956, US 17 was widened to four lanes between Ridgeland and Pocotaligo. That same year, it was widened to four lanes between what is now SC 171 and Downtown Charleston.

In 1961, a second draw span over the Ashley River was opened to traffic, this was done to reduce congestion. This one was officially named the T. Allen Legare Bridge.

In 1963, the segment of roadway between Myrtle Beach and Atlantic Beach was widened to four lanes.

The first tourist welcome center in South Carolina opened in February 1968 on US 17 near Little River.

In December 1968, the segment of roadway in Downtown Charleston was moved off of local streets and onto the Crosstown Expressway.

A segment of US 17 between Ridgeland and Point South once contained two four-lane divided sections. The first is in Coosawhatchie between north of the culvert for Little Bees Creek and north of the bridge over the Coosawhatchie River. From 1971 to 1975, portions of the segment were relocated onto I-95. The divided section in Coosawhatchie remains intact, while the northbound lane near the Tullifinny wetlands was closed, and today is used for a fishing pier, a parking lot of a church, and a private home.

In 1980, the road was widened to four lanes between Awendaw and McLellanville.

In 1981, a bypass of Myrtle Beach was opened, US 17 Business was designated in its former place. it involved constructing new roadways, as well as utilizing existing roadways.

In 1997, US 17 was rerouted to cross the Georgia state line through Savannah, this new segment replaced US 17 Alt. The old route into Georgia became part of an extended SC 170.

In 2005, the Crosstown Expressway segment concurrent with Lee Street was permanently closed. In its place, a new concurrency with I-26 was created, and a new Meeting Street interchange was also constructed. This was done as part of a project to replace the obsolete Cooper River bridges.

On April 21, 2010, the Crosstown Expressway was renamed the Septa Clark Expressway.

=== ACE Basin widening project ===
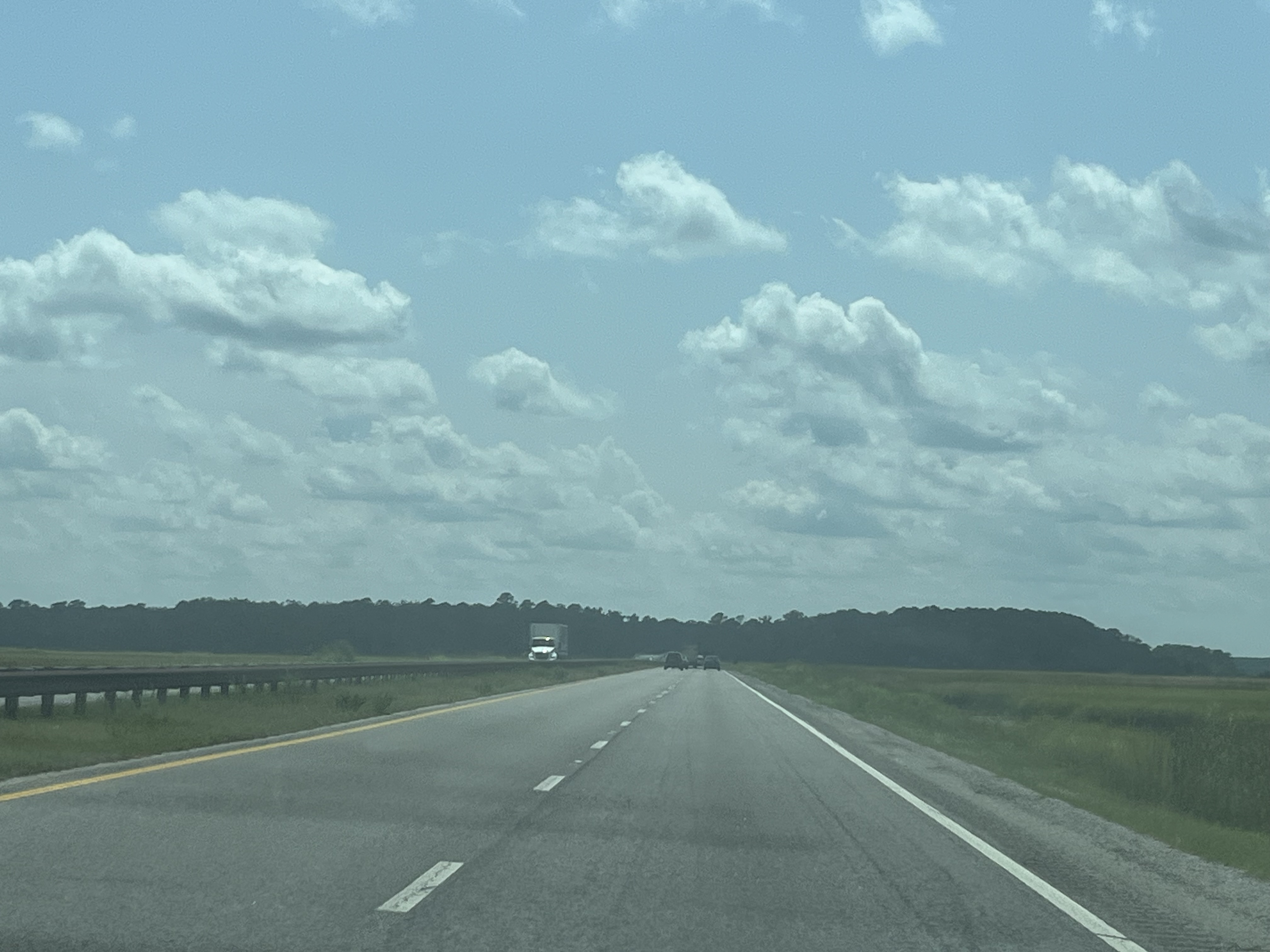
US 17 in the ACE Basin

The widening project addressed a 22-mile segment of the highway stretching from Gardens Corner in Beaufort County to Jacksonboro in Colleton County. This segment of the road, notorious for its high accident rate, was featured on an NBC Dateline special titled America's Most Dangerous Roads. In 1985, the South Carolina Department of Transportation (SCDOT) recognized the need to improve the segment of US 17 due to substantial capacity and safety concerns. The project faced delays due to environmental challenges. Between 1997 and 2005, the segment experienced nearly 1,000 crashes, including 33 fatalities.

The project widened the two-lane roadway to a four-lane highway, incorporating a grass median. Improvements included enhanced roadway alignments, bridge replacements, and upgraded intersections. Notably, the US 17/US 21 intersection was converted into a diamond interchange featuring a roundabout. The total estimated cost for the project was $173.4 million.

== Highway names ==
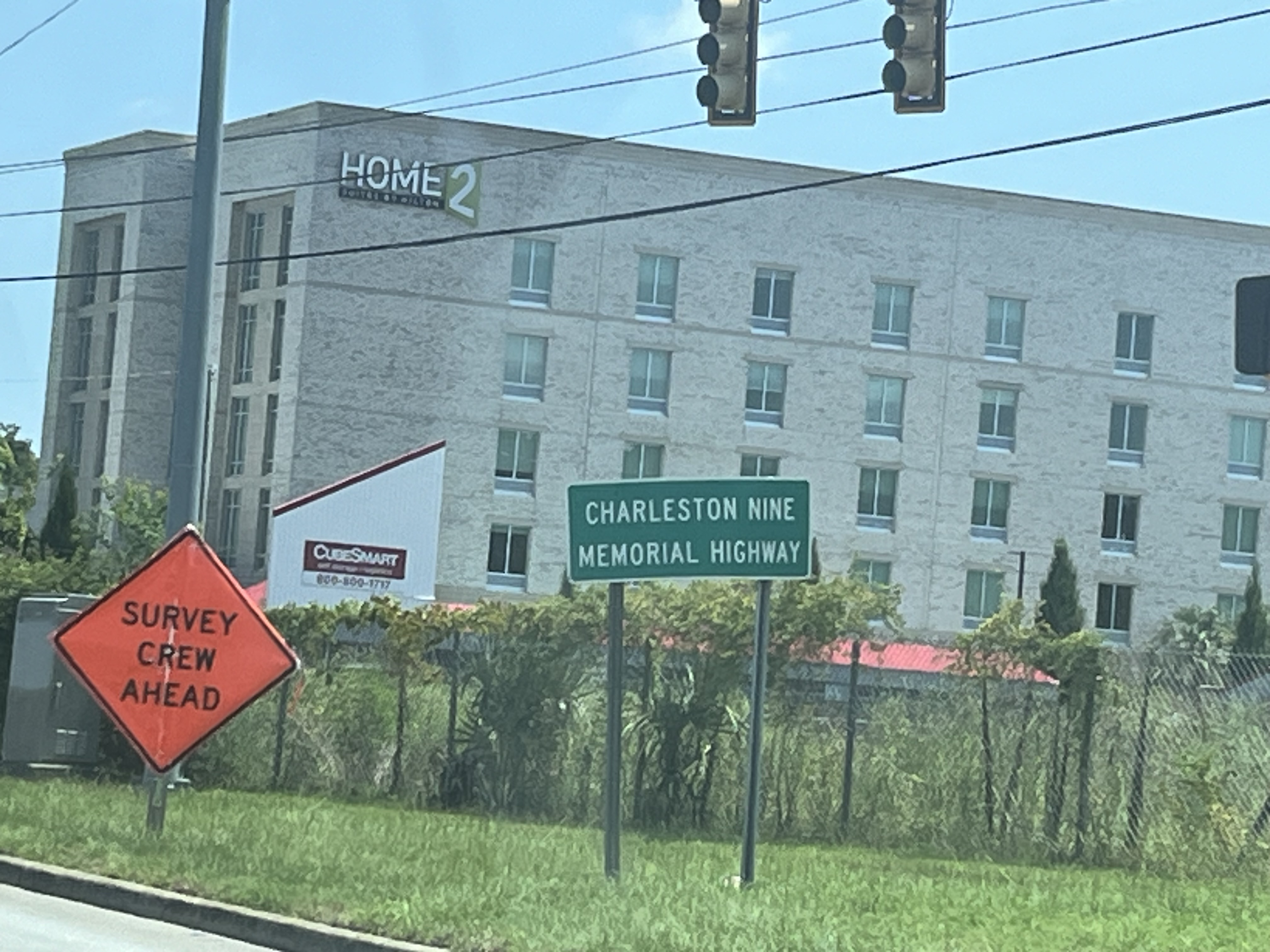
Charleston Nine Memorial Highway sign

US 17 has several named segments in South Carolina. A section on the Crosstown from Cannon Street and Spring Street to the eastern terminus of I-26 is named the Septima P. Clark Parkway, after U.S. civil rights activist Septima Poinsette Clark. A 3.6-mile (5.8 km) section in West Ashley, running from South Carolina Highway 7 (SC 7) to South Carolina Highway 171 (SC 171), is named the Charleston Nine Memorial Highway, in honor of the nine Charleston firefighters killed in the line of duty in the Charleston Sofa Super Store fire on June 18, 2007. A section in Beaufort and Colleton counties is named the W. Brantley Harvey Highway, after former state legislator and lieutenant governor W. Brantley Harvey Jr. A section from 8th Avenue North to Starwatch Drive in Horry County is named the George Rayford Vereen Highway, after George Rayford Vereen, a former chairman of the Horry County Transportation Committee. A section from Old Jacksonboro Road to SC 7 is named the Curtis B. Inabinett, Sr. Highway, after Curtis B. Inabinett, Sr., a former member of the South Carolina House of Representatives.

== Major intersections ==
| County | Location | mi | km | Destinations | Notes |
|---|---|---|---|---|---|
| Jasper | | 0.000 | 0.000 | US 17 south / SR 404 Spur south – Savannah | Continuation from Georgia |
| Jasper | | 4.100 | 6.598 | SC 315 north (South Okatie Highway) – Bluffton, Hilton Head Island, Beaufort | Southern terminus of SC 315 |
| Jasper | | 6.610 | 10.638 | SC 170 west (Alligator Alley) – Port Wentworth | Southern end of SC 170 concurrency |
| Jasper | Limehouse | 8.110 | 13.052 | SC 170 east (Freedom Parkway) – Hilton Head Island, Beaufort | Northern end of SC 170 concurrency |
| Jasper | Hardeeville | 13.050 | 21.002 | I-95 – Florence, Jacksonville | I-95 exit 5 |
| Jasper | Hardeeville | 13.740 | 22.112 | US 321 north (Deerfield Road) – Augusta | Southern terminus of US 321; to Jasper Power Plant |
| Jasper | Hardeeville | 14.050 | 22.611 | SC 46 (Main Street) – Tillman, Hilton Head Island | |
| Jasper | | 16.020 | 25.782 | US 278 east to I-95 – Beaufort, Hilton Head Island | Southern end of US 278 concurrency |
| Jasper | Ridgeland | 26.410 | 42.503 | SR 13 south to I-95 – Savannah, Florence | Northern terminus of S-27-13 |
| Jasper | Ridgeland | 28.680 | 46.156 | SC 336 (Main Street) – Tillman | |
| Jasper | Ridgeland | 28.820 | 46.381 | US 278 west – Hampton | Northern end of US 278 concurrency |
| Jasper | Ridgeland | 30.158– 30.670 | 48.535– 49.359 | I-95 south – Savannah | Southern end of I-95 concurrency; I-95 exit 22 |
| Jasper | | 36.180 | 58.226 | SC 462 – Coosawhatchie | I-95 exit 28 |
| Jasper | Point South | 40.560– 40.820 | 65.275– 65.693 | I-95 north – Florence | Northern end of I-95 concurrency; I-95 exit 33 |
| Beaufort | Pocotaligo | 42.580 | 68.526 | US 21 north (Castle Hall Road) / US 17 Alt. north – Yemassee, Walterboro | Southern end of US 21 concurrency; southern terminus of US 17 Alt. |
| Beaufort | Gardens Corner | 48.860– 49.120 | 78.633– 79.051 | US 21 south (Trask Parkway) – Beaufort | Northern end of US 21 concurrency |
| Colleton | Green Pond | 61.145 | 98.403 | SC 303 north (Green Pond Highway) – Walterboro | Southern terminus of SC 303 |
| Colleton | Jacksonboro | 71.172 | 114.540 | SC 64 west (Charleston Highway) – Walterboro | Eastern terminus of SC 64 |
| Charleston | Osborn | 78.160 | 125.786 | SC 174 south – Edisto Beach | Northern terminus of SC 174 |
| Charleston | Ravenel | 84.120 | 135.378 | SC 165 – Younges Island, Summerville | |
| Charleston | Ravenel | 90.030 | 144.889 | SC 162 west – Hollywood, Edisto Beach | Eastern terminus of SC 162 |
| Charleston | Charleston | 97.440 | 156.814 | SC 7 north (Sam Rittenburg Boulevard) | Southern terminus of SC 7 |
| Charleston | Charleston | 97.530– 97.540 | 156.959– 156.975 | I-526 east – North Charleston, Charleston International Airport | Western terminus of I-526; provides access to Charleston International Airport |
| Charleston | Charleston | 101.060 | 162.640 | SC 171 (Wesley Drive) – James Island, Folly Beach | |
| Charleston | Charleston | 101.221– 101.340 | 162.899– 163.091 | SC 61 north (St. Andrews Boulevard) – Summerville | No access from US 17 to SC 61 south, from SC 61 south to US 17 south, or from SC 61 north to US 17 |
| Charleston | Charleston | 101.440 | 163.252 | SC 700 south (Folly Road Boulevard) – Folly Beach | No access from US 17 north to SC 700; northern terminus of SC 700 |
| Charleston | Charleston | 101.823– 101.827 | 163.868– 163.875 | Ashley River Memorial Bridge across the Ashley River | |
| Charleston | Charleston | 102.149– 102.220 | 164.393– 164.507 | SC 30 west / Lockwood Drive – James Island, Folly Beach | Eastern terminus of SC 30 |
| Charleston | Charleston | 103.170 | 166.036 | King Street (US 78) | Southbound exit only; southern end of I-26 concurrency; eastern terminus of I-26; ramp end at Carolina Street, which leads to King Street. |
| Charleston | Charleston | 103.750 | 166.969 | I-26 west – North Charleston, Columbia | Northern end of I-26 concurrency |
| Charleston | Charleston | 103.857– 104.155 | 167.142– 167.621 | Meeting Street (US 52) | Southbound exit and northbound entrance |
| Charleston | Charleston | 104.200– 104.820 | 167.694– 168.691 | East Bay Street / Morrison Drive (US 52 Spur) | Southbound exit and northbound entrance |
| Charleston | Charleston–Mount Pleasant line | 105.496 | 169.779 | Arthur Ravenel Jr. Bridge over the Cooper River | |
| Charleston | Mount Pleasant | 106.430– 106.565 | 171.282– 171.500 | SC 703 north (Coleman Boulevard) – Sullivan's Island | Northbound exit and southbound entrance; southern terminus of SC 703 |
| Charleston | Mount Pleasant | 106.607 | 171.567 | Wingo Way | No access from US 17 to Wingo Way or from Wingo Way to US 17 north |
| Charleston | Mount Pleasant | 109.690– 109.780 | 176.529– 176.674 | I-526 west / I-526 BS east (Chuck Dawley Boulevard) to SC 703 – North Charleston, Savannah | No access from US 17 north to I-526 Bus., from US 17 south to I-526, from I-526 ro US 17 north, or from I-526 Bus. to US 17 south; eastern terminus of I-526; western terminus of I-526 Bus. |
| Charleston | Mount Pleasant | 110.130– 110.220 | 177.237– 177.382 | I-526 west / Hungryneck Boulevard east – North Charleston, Savannah | Western terminus of Hungryneck Boulevard; Representative H.B. "Chip" Limehouse III Interchange |
| Charleston | Mount Pleasant | 111.640 | 179.667 | SC 517 south (Isle of Palms Connector) – Isle of Palms | Northern terminus of SC 517 |
| Charleston | Mount Pleasant | 114.140 | 183.691 | SC 41 north / Dingle Road east – Huger | Southern terminus of SC 41; western terminus of Dingle Road |
| Charleston | McClellanville | 140.060 | 225.405 | SC 45 north / South Pinckney Street south | Southern terminus of SC 45; northern terminus of South Pinckney Street |
| Georgetown | Georgetown | 162.770– 162.879 | 261.953– 262.128 | US 521 north (Highmarket Street) / US 701 north (Fraser Street) / US 17 Alt. south (Exchange Street) – Andrews, Walterboro, Conway | Northern terminus of US 17 Alt; southern terminus of US 521 and US 701 |
| Georgetown | Georgetown | 164.391– 165.070 | 264.562– 265.654 | L.H. Siau Bridges across the Pee Dee, Black, and Waccamaw rivers (Intracoastal Waterway) | |
| Georgetown | Murrells Inlet | 181.830 | 292.627 | US 17 Bus. north – Murrells Inlet | Southern terminus of US 17 Bus. |
| Georgetown | Murrells Inlet | 185.190 | 298.034 | SC 707 (Burgess Road) to SC 31 – Conway, North Myrtle Beach, Murrells Inlet | |
| Georgetown–Horry county line | Murrells Inlet–Garden City line | 185.570 | 298.646 | US 17 Bus. north (US 17 Conn. north) – Garden City, Surfside Beach | Northbound exit and southbound entrance; southern terminus of US 17 Conn. |
| Horry | Garden City | 189.389 | 304.792 | Glenns Bay Road south / Holmestown Road north – Surfside Beach | Interchange |
| Horry | Socastee | 191.769– 191.775 | 308.622– 308.632 | SC 544 (Dick Pond Road) to SC 31 – Socastee, Conway, Surfside Beach | Nelson Jackson Memorial Interchange |
| Horry | Socastee–Myrtle Beach line | 194.465 | 312.961 | SC 707 south (Socastee Boulevard) / Farrow Parkway south – Socastee, Horry-Georgetown Technical College Grand Strand Campus | Northern terminus of SC 707 and Farrow Parkway; interchange |
| Horry | Myrtle Beach | 196.595 | 316.389 | George Bishop Parkway west / Harrelson Boulevard south – Fantasy Harbour, Myrtle Beach International Airport | Eastern terminus of George Bishop Parkway; northern terminus of Harrelson Boulevard; interchange |
| Horry | Myrtle Beach | 197.625– 197.655 | 318.047– 318.095 | US 501 – Myrtle Beach, Conway | Cloverleaf interchange |
| Horry | Myrtle Beach | 201.905 | 324.935 | Grissom Parkway to SC 31 – Downtown | No northbound south exit |
| Horry | Myrtle Beach | 205.199– 205.545 | 330.236– 330.793 | US 17 Bus. south (Kings Highway) – Myrtle Beach | Northern terminus of US 17 Bus. |
| Horry | | 207.325– 207.735 | 333.657– 334.317 | SC 22 west (Conway Bypass) to SC 31 / US 501 – Conway | Eastern terminus of SC 22; interchange |
| Horry | North Myrtle Beach | 211.215 | 339.918 | SC 65 north (27th Avenue South) – Crescent Beach | Southern terminus of SC 65 |
| Horry | North Myrtle Beach | 213.685 | 343.893 | Robert Edge Parkway north (SC 31 Conn. north) / Main Street south – Wampee, Downtown North Myrtle Beach | Southern terminus of SC 31 Conn. and Robert Edge Parkway; northern terminus of Main Street |
| Horry | North Myrtle Beach | 215.725 | 347.176 | SC 9 south – Cherry Grove Beach | Southern end of SC 9 concurrency; interchange |
| Horry | Little River | 216.522– 216.523 | 348.458– 348.460 | SC 90 – Conway | Northbound exit and southbound entrance |
| Horry | Little River | 216.575– 216.735 | 348.544– 348.801 | SC 9 north to SC 31 – Loris, Dillon | Northern end of SC 9 concurrency |
| Horry | Little River | 217.825– 217.845 | 350.555– 350.588 | SC 90 west – Conway | Eastern terminus of SC 90 |
| Horry | Little River | 220.835 | 355.399 | SC 179 north / Graystone Boulevard – Calabash | Southern terminus of SC 179 |
| Horry | | 221.454 | 356.396 | US 17 north – Shallotte, Wilmington | Continuation into North Carolina |
1.000 mi = 1.609 km; 1.000 km = 0.621 mi: Concurrency terminus; Incomplete access

== See also ==
- Special routes of U.S. Route 17

U.S. Route 17
| Previous state: Georgia | South Carolina | Next state: North Carolina |
