= John F. Limehouse Memorial Bridge =

Limehouse Memorial Bridge
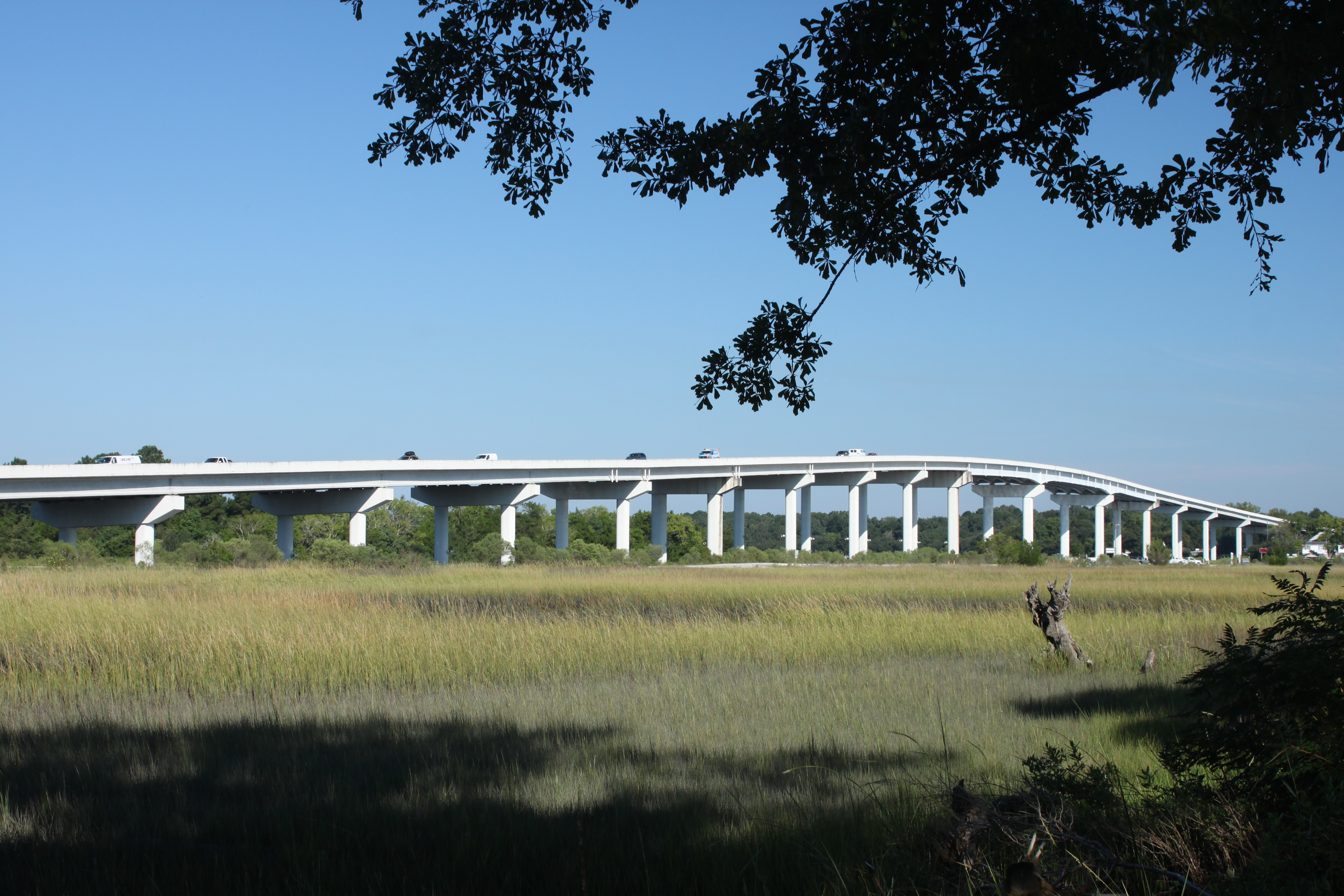
- Coordinates: 32°47′9″N 80°6′28″W
- Carries: State Road S-10-20 Main Road
- Crosses: Stono River (Intracoastal Waterway)
- Locale: West Ashley – John's Island, South Carolina, United States
- Official name: John F. Limehouse; Memorial Bridge
- Maintained by: South Carolina Department of Transportation

Characteristics
- Total length: 2,800 feet (850 m)
- Clearance above: 65 feet (20 m) (high water)

History
- Opened: 2003

Location
- Interactive map of Limehouse Memorial Bridge

The John F. Limehouse Memorial Bridge, located about 15 miles (24 km) west of downtown Charleston, South Carolina, was completed in 2003. It replaced an obsolete low-level swing bridge over the Stono River. The current bridge, which crosses a channel between Johns Island and St. Andrews Parish, an area generally called West Ashley, was completed under a partnership between the South Carolina Department of Transportation (SCDOT) and the United States Coast Guard.

== Purpose ==
The Stono River is a critical part of the 3,000 miles (4,800 km) of Intracoastal Waterway used by barges, fishing boats, and recreational mariners. The former swing bridge, built in 1929, was an obstruction to vessel traffic, thus removal was mandated by the U.S. Coast Guard in an Order to Alter issued in 1994, leaving only a few swing bridges in the Coast Guard’s Seventh District, from Key West, Florida, to the northernmost areas of South Carolina.

The current, 2,800-foot-long (850 m) concrete structure is a high-level, fixed span. The new bridge has a horizontal clearance for vessels of 215 feet (66 m) compared with the former clearance of 93 feet (28 m) and a vertical clearance of 65 feet (20 m) above the high-water mark, compared to a previous clearance of only 13 feet (4.0 m) in the closed position. The new structure accommodates four lanes of traffic and provides access to Johns, Kiawah, Seabrook, and Wadmalaw Islands.

== Design and construction ==
Design of the bridge was contracted to Ralph Whitehead Associates, Inc., of Charlotte, North Carolina. Construction was awarded to Jones Brothers, Inc., of Mt. Juliet, Tennessee. The Coast Guard provided about $21 million of the total $30 million bridge cost, with the rest paid by the State.

The State government donated the debris to the South Carolina Department of Natural Resources artificial reef program. After demolishing the old span, the contractor transported its concrete and steel components to the Kiawah Reef site about 23 miles (37 km) away. The current bridge was opened to traffic in June 2003, approximately two months ahead of schedule.

== See also ==
- List of bridges documented by the Historic American Engineering Record in South Carolina
