= Stono River =

River in South Carolina, United States

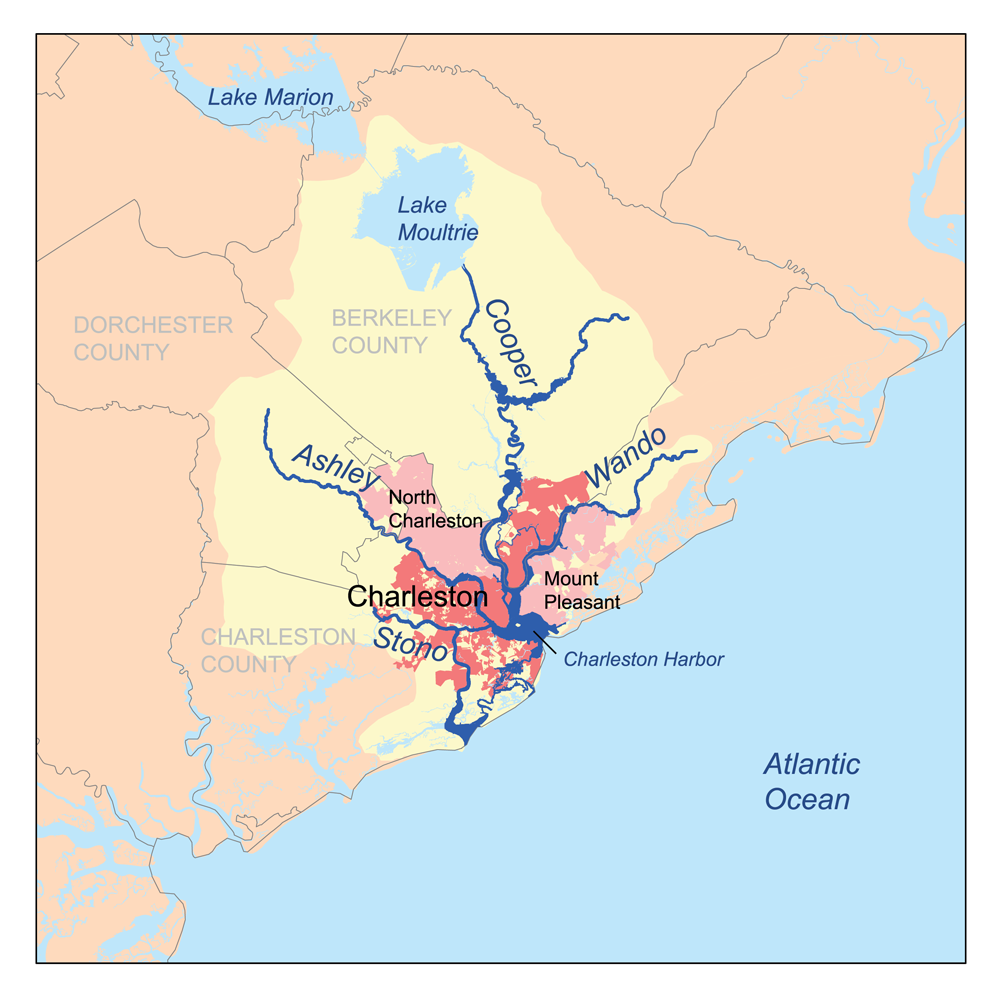
- Map of the Charleston Harbor watershed showing Stono River

- Location of mouth

Location
- Country: United States
- State: South Carolina

Physical characteristics
- Source
  - coordinates: 32.7099007°N 80.1900971°W
- Mouth
  - location: Atlantic Ocean
  - coordinates: 32.6368472°N 80.0150926°W

The Stono River or Creek is a tidal channel in southeast South Carolina, located southwest of Charleston. The channel runs southwest to northeast between the mainland and Wadmalaw Island and Johns Island, from north Edisto River between Johns (West) and James (East) Islands. The Intracoastal Waterway runs through southwest–northeast section of the channel.

In 1725, Columbian mammoth teeth were excavated from the vicinity by African slaves, with the slaves correctly noting the resemblance to teeth of African elephants from their homeland, marking one of the earliest finds of mammoth remains in North America.

The Stono River is noted for the Stono Rebellion which started on September 9, 1739. Started by slaves from West Africa, likely from the Kingdom of Kongo, it became the largest slave uprising in the British mainland colonies prior to the American Revolution.

On June 20, 1779, it was also the site of the Battle of Stono Ferry during the American Revolution.

On January 30, 1863, as part of the American Civil War, a Confederate force captured the Union steamer USS Isaac Smith in which 8 men died and a further 17 were wounded in crossfire.

== Bridges ==
- John F. Limehouse Memorial Bridge
- Paul J. Gelegotis Memorial Bridge

== See also ==
- Waterways forming and crossings of the Atlantic Intracoastal Waterway
