= Hilton Head Island metropolitan area =

- Metropolitan Statistical Area
- Hilton Head Island–Bluffton–Port Royal, SC; Metropolitan Statistical Area
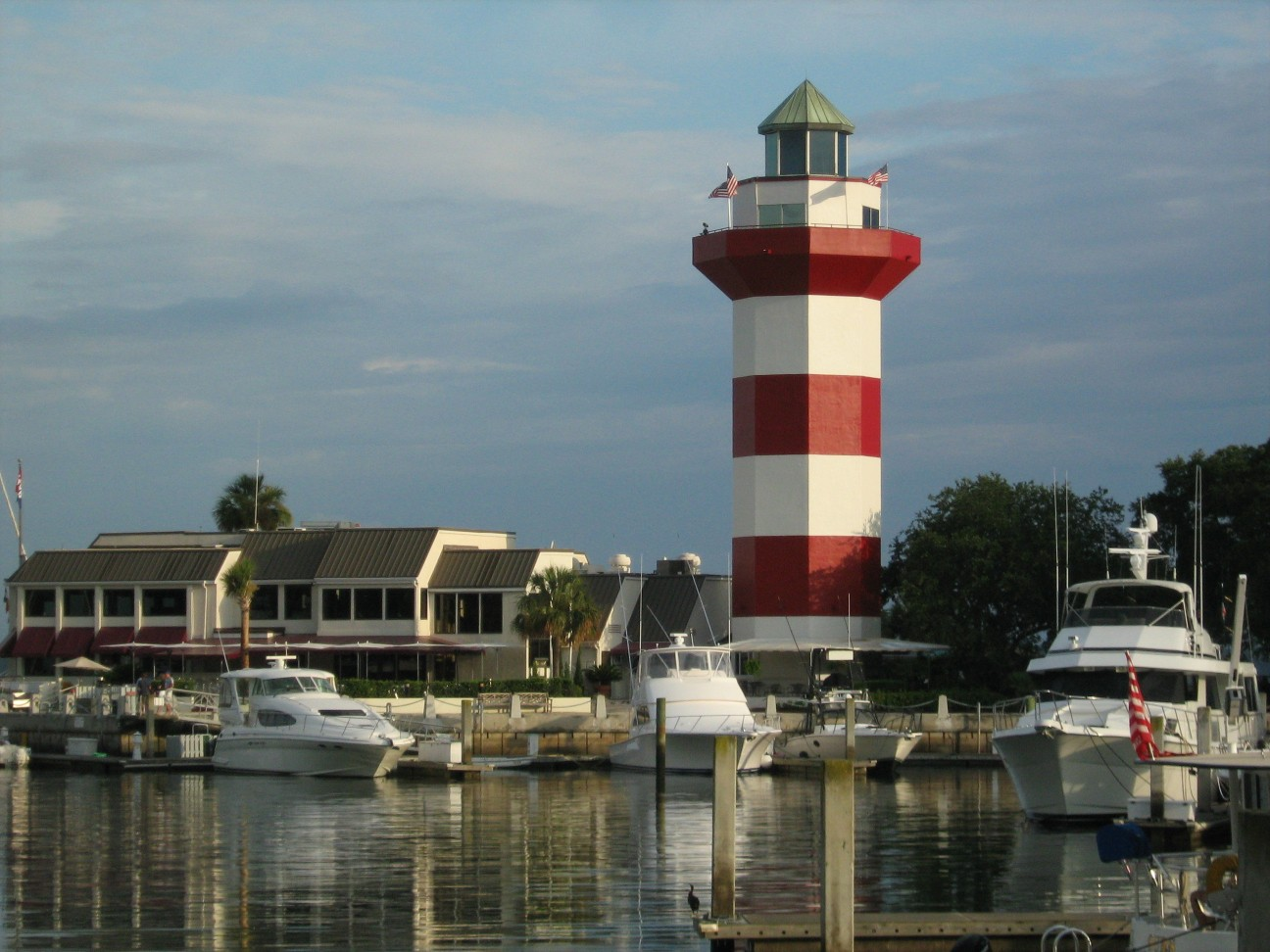
- Harbour Town Marina in Sea Pines Resort with the Harbour Town Lighthouse
Map of Hilton Head Island–Bluffton–Port Royal, SC MSA
Hilton Head Island
Hilton Head Island–Bluffton–Port Royal MSA
- Country: United States
- State: South Carolina
- Largest city: Hilton Head Island
- Other cities: Bluffton; Port Royal; Beaufort

Area
  - Total: 1,231 sq mi (3,190 km^{2})

Population (2020)
  - Total: 215,908

GDP
  - Total: $12.497 billion (2022)
- Time zone: UTC−5 (EST)
  - Summer (DST): UTC−4 (EDT)

The Hilton Head Island metropolitan area, officially the Hilton Head Island–Bluffton–Port Royal, SC Metropolitan Statistical Area as defined by the United States Census Bureau, is a metropolitan statistical area consisting of the two southernmost counties in the South Carolina Lowcountry, centered on the resort town of Hilton Head Island. As of the 2020 census, the MSA had a population of 215,908. Prior to March 2013, the region was considered a micropolitan statistical area.

== Counties ==
Historical population
Census	Pop.	Note	%±
1950	37,988		—
1960	56,424		48.5%
1970	63,021		11.7%
1980	79,868		26.7%
1990	101,912		27.6%
2000	141,615		39.0%
2010	187,010		32.1%
2020	215,908		15.5%
data source:

- Beaufort
- Jasper

== Communities ==
- Places with more than 30,000 inhabitants
  - Hilton Head Island (principal city)
  - Bluffton (principal city)
- Places with 10,000 to 30,000 inhabitants
  - Beaufort (Beaufort County, seat)
  - Port Royal (principal city)
- Places with 5,000 to 10,000 inhabitants
  - Burton
  - Hardeeville
  - Laurel Bay
- Places with fewer than 5,000 inhabitants
  - Ridgeland (Jasper County, seat)
  - Shell Point (census-designated place)
  - Yemassee (partial)
- Unincorporated places
  - Beaufort County
    - Dale
    - Fripp Island
    - Harbor Island
    - Lady's Island
    - Lobeco
    - Okatie
    - Pritchardville
    - St. Helena Island, including Frogmore and Lands End
    - Sheldon
    - Sun City
  - Jasper County
    - Coosawhatchie
    - Grahamville
    - Levy
    - Limehouse
    - Old House
    - Robertville
    - Switzerland
    - Tillman

== Demographics ==
The population was 187,010 at the 2010 census.

As of the census of 2000, there were 141,615 people, 52,574 households, and 38,147 families residing within the MSA. The racial makeup of the MSA was 66.53% White, 28.17% African American, 0.28% Native American, 0.74% Asian, 0.05% Pacific Islander, 2.92% from other races, and 1.30% from two or more races. Hispanic or Latino of any race were 6.64% of the population.

The median income for a household in the MSA was $38,860, and the median income for a family was $44,749. Males had a median income of $29,974 versus $23,170 for females. The per capita income for the MSA was $19,769.

County	Seat	2025 estimate	2020 Census	Change	Land area	Density
Beaufort	Beaufort	204,433	187,117	+9.25%	576.04 sq mi (1,492 km^{2})	355/sq mi (137/km^{2})
Jasper	Ridgeland	38,533	28,791	+33.84%	655.16 sq mi (1,697 km^{2})	59/sq mi (23/km^{2})
Total		242,966	215,908	+12.53%	1,231.2 sq mi (3,189 km^{2})	197/sq mi (76/km^{2})

== See also ==
- South Carolina statistical areas
- South Carolina Lowcountry
