= South Carolina Highway 170 =

State highway in South Carolina

South Carolina Highway 170

Route information
- Maintained by SCDOT
- Length: 49.010 mi (78.874 km)
- Existed: 1931–present
- Tourist routes: SC 170 Scenic Byway

Major junctions
- West end: SR 25 at the Georgia state line in Port Wentworth, GA
- US 17 near Limehouse; US 278 in Bluffton; US 21 in Beaufort
- East end: US 21 Bus. in Beaufort

Location
- Country: United States
- State: South Carolina
- Counties: Jasper, Beaufort

Highway system
- South Carolina State Highway System; Interstate; US; State; Scenic
← SC 165	→ SC 171

South Carolina Highway 170 (SC 170) is a 49.010-mile (78.874 km) state highway, connecting northern Beaufort County with southern portions of Beaufort and Jasper counties. Due to increased population growth in both areas, the majority of the road is four lanes wide, with certain areas retaining the original two-lane configuration.

== Route description ==
Beginning at a bridge over the Savannah River, the highway travels through a densely wooded area and crosses nearly 2 miles (3.2 km) of marshes within the Savannah National Wildlife Refuge. At the site of a former truck weigh station, the highway merges with U.S. Route 17 (US 17); SC 170 is concurrent with US 17 for approximately 2 miles (3.2 km) on a four-lane, divided highway configuration. In Limehouse the highway branches off from US 17 to the east after traveling under an abandoned railroad bridge, and flanks the east side of that highway momentarily until a fork on the road with Limehouse Road (which includes Levy Road slicing through both) where it curves onto Freedom Parkway. Freedom Parkway makes a slight curve to the right before terminating at SC 315 (formerly SC 170 Alternate), and SC 170 makes a left turn at Okatie Highway. SC 170 rejoins its previous trajectory after the western terminus of the concurrency with SC 46. SC 170 and SC 46 are concurrent for 2.7-mile (4.3 km) crossing the Beaufort County line in the process where it becomes May River Road until reaching a traffic circle in Pritchardville. SC 46 continues to the east while SC 170 turns north onto four-lane Okatie Highway.

After the Bluffton Parkway, which provides direct access to Bluffton, it skirts the eastern edge of the Sun City Hilton Head development, then travels under a partial cloverleaf interchange with US 278, which is known locally as McGarvey's Corner. For the next approximately 8 miles (13 km), the highway travels along the Jasper–Beaufort county line. The divided highway briefly ends at the intersection of a private road named "Heffallump Road" but remains four-lanes with a center turn lane provision only to become a divided highway again at the Oldfield Golf Club and Equestrian Center. Curving back to the east as it approaches the intersection with SC 462, the highway later re-enters Jasper County at the two ends of Old Baileys Road, then travels along the Jasper–Beaufort county line again until it reaches the intersection of Snake Road and Callawassie Island's entrance road.

Now in Beaufort County proper once again, the highway becomes more scenic, with panoramas of marshes and surrounding islands extending for miles. The divided highway ends again, as it approaches the Edgar C. Glenn Boat Ramp under the four-lane (with center-painted divider) bridge over the Chechesee River and enters Lemon Island. The highway briefly becomes a four-lane divided highway again as it winds southeast through the island but the divider itself is short-lived. SC 170 leaves the island and enters Burton by crossing the Broad River over the 1.7-mile-long (2.7 km), four-lane Edward Burton Rogers Bridge. The bridge was built in 2004 and replaced a two-lane drawbridge. Before returning to the mainland, the remains of the former drawbridge can be found on the north side of the existing bridge, and serves as a fishing pier, then a frontage road to the Broad River Boat Launching area. SC 170 is now known as Robert Smalls Parkway for approximately 5 miles (8.0 km) as it travels in a northeasterly direction across Port Royal Island. The frontage road ends across from the intersection with SC 128, and later SC 170 intersects with US 21 and briefly becomes a divided highway at the crossing with the Spanish Moss Trail before turning straight north and finally ending at US 21 Business (US 21 Bus.) in Beaufort.

== History ==
Established around 1931 as a new primary routing from US 17 (today Levy Road S-27-34) to SC 33 (today SC 46). In 1939, it was extended north to where US 278 exists today. In 1940, it was extended north again to SC 368, near Coosawhatchie; and again by 1942 to US 17 in Coosawhatchie. In 1949, SC 170 was extended west from Coosawhatchie to SC 128, near Gillisonville, a renumbering of SC 366. In 1958, SC 170 was rerouted to US 21 in Beaufort, via the Broad River Bridge, replacing part of SC 169; its old alignment north through Coosawhatchie was renumbered to SC 462. Around 1975, SC 170 was extended slightly south over an old alignment of US 17 as mainline US 17 was placed on a new bypass west of Limehouse. In 1995, SC 170 was extended south into Georgia, replacing a section of mainline US 17.

== Major intersections ==
County	Location	mi	km	Destinations	Notes
Jasper		0.000	0.000	SR 25 south – Port Wentworth	Continuation beyond Georgia state line over the Little Back River
Jasper		3.330	5.359	US 17 south – Savannah	Western end of US 17 concurrency
Jasper	Limehouse	4.830	7.773	US 17 north – Hardeeville	Eastern end of US 17 concurrency
Jasper		8.760	14.098	SC 315 south – Savannah	Northern terminus of SC 315
Jasper		8.980	14.452	SC 46 west (Plantation Drive) – Hardeeville	Western end of SC 46 concurrency
Beaufort	Pritchardville	11.523	18.544	SC 46 east (May River Road) / New Riverside Road – Bluffton	Eastern end of SC 46 concurrency; roundabout
Beaufort	Bluffton	16.055	25.838	US 278 (Fording Island Road) – Hilton Head Island, Hardeeville	
Beaufort		20.135	32.404	SC 462 north (Low Country Drive) – Ridgeland	Southern terminus of SC 462
Jasper	No major junctions				
Beaufort	Broad River	42.885	69.017	Broad River Bridge over the Broad River	
Beaufort	Port Royal	44.140	71.036	SC 128 east (Savannah Highway) – Parris Island, Port Royal, Sea Islands	Formerly the southern terminus for SC 802
Beaufort	Beaufort	47.360	76.219	US 21 (Parris Island Gateway) – Parris Island, Charleston, Columbia	
Beaufort	Beaufort	49.010	78.874	US 21 Bus. (Boundary Street) – Beaufort, Charleston, Columbia	Eastern terminus
1.000 mi = 1.609 km; 1.000 km = 0.621 mi: Concurrency terminus

== Special routes ==
=== Levy alternate route ===
South Carolina Highway 170 Alternate
- Location: Levy, South Carolina
- Length: 6.1 mi (9.8 km)
- Existed: 1972–2010

South Carolina Highway 170 Alternate (SC 170 Alt.) was a 6.1-mile (9.8 km) alternate route that was established around 1972 as a new primary routing from U.S. Route 17 Alternate (US 17 Alt.) to SC 170; an upgrade to secondary road S-27-117 (built in the late 1950s) and part of S-27-92 (Belinger Hill Road). Its existence created a rare alternate spur, but provided a more direct routing between Bluffton and Savannah, Georgia. In 2010, it was renumbered as SC 315.

The entire route is in Jasper County.

Location	mi	km	Destinations	Notes
	0.0	0.0	US 17 (Speedway Boulevard) – Hardeeville, Savannah	Southern terminus
	6.1	9.8	SC 170 (Freedom Parkway / South Okatie Highway) to SC 46 – Bluffton, Hilton Head Island	Northern terminus
1.000 mi = 1.609 km; 1.000 km = 0.621 mi
