= South Carolina Highway 315 =

State highway in South Carolina, United States

South Carolina Highway 315
- South Okatie Highway

Route information
- Maintained by SCDOT
- Length: 6.067 mi (9.764 km)
- Existed: 2010–present

Major junctions
- South end: US 17 near Levy
- North end: SC 170 near Levy

Location
- Country: United States
- State: South Carolina
- Counties: Jasper

Highway system
- South Carolina State Highway System; Interstate; US; State; Scenic
← SC 314	→ SC 319

South Carolina Highway 315 (SC 315) is a 6.067-mile (9.764 km) state highway, serving as a more direct route between Savannah, Georgia and several Lowcountry communities in the U.S. state of South Carolina through southern Jasper County. Once the original alignment of SC 170 (until 1994) and SC 170 Alternate (SC 170 Alt.), this route was renumbered in 2010 to clarify conflicting and confusing route alignments. The route, known for the entire length as South Okatie Highway, also serves the unincorporated community of Levy.

== Route description ==
The route travels generally in a south to north direction and is a two-lane road for the entire length. SC 315 begins about five miles north of the Georgia state line at a flashing light intersection with U.S. Highway 17. SC 315 travels in a northeastern direction for two miles before veering toward a more northerly path. The route crosses through the commercial area of Levy before entering additional rural areas. The route terminates upon reaching an intersection with SC 170 west (Freedom Parkway), in which the South Okatie Highway continues straight as SC 170 eastbound, shortly before another similar intersection with SC 46.

== Major intersections ==
The entire route is in Jasper County.

Location	mi	km	Destinations	Notes
	0.000	0.000	US 17 (Speedway Boulevard) – Hardeeville, Savannah	
	6.067	9.764	SC 170 (Freedom Parkway / South Okatie Highway) to SC 46 – Bluffton, Hilton Head Island	
1.000 mi = 1.609 km; 1.000 km = 0.621 mi
