= WNFO =

- Sun City–Hilton Head, South Carolina; United States
- Frequency: 1430 kHz

Programming
- Format: Regional Mexican

Ownership
- Owner: Walter M. Czura

History
- First air date: 1953 (as WBUG)
- Last air date: March 4, 2025 (license cancelled)
- Former call signs: WBUG (1953–1979); WJMR (1979–1984); WBUG (1984–1986); WCOG (1986–1992)

Technical information
- Licensing authority: FCC
- Facility ID: 70793
- Class: D
- Power: 213 watts days only
- Transmitter coordinates: 32°21′24.7″N 80°55′22.4″W

Links
- Public license information: Public file; LMS

WNFO (1430 AM) was a radio station broadcasting a Regional Mexican format. It was dual licensed to Sun City and Hilton Head, South Carolina. The station was owned by Walter M. Czura.

WNFO was a daytimer station, transmitting with 213 watts. To protect other stations on 1430 AM from interference, it was required to sign off the air at sunset.

== History ==
The station went on the air as WBUG in 1953 by farmer and country music recording artist, Sam Malphrus. Malphrus sold the station to a publishing company owned by Joseph Sink. Sink sold the station in 1975 to some business partners who worked for ABC Radio in New York. One of the partners, Dale Hawkins moved to the Hilton Head area to work as the general manager of the station. During its heyday in the mid-1970s, some stronger DJs were hired and the station was known as "Rockin 143 - WBUG".

Even though the station was listed in the Savannah, Georgia, broadcasting market, its low power pretty much only serviced its licensed area of Ridgeland and the Greater Jasper County area. There were however some Savannah ratings and the station did get nominated a few times for the "Addy Award" for its talented production team.

In the early 1980s, the station was sold again to a marketing firm in Hilton Head who used it for promoting the Hilton Head Island resort area, basically becoming a full-time "infomercial" for local tourism. Permission was granted through the Federal Communications Commission to move its city of license to Hilton Head. It is believed to have gone "dark" meaning it went off the air for a short amount of time before the frequency was sold in 1984. The station changed its call sign to WCOG on January 16, 1986, and to WNFO on April 13, 1992.

The FCC cancelled the station's license on March 4, 2025.
