= South Carolina Highway 46 =

State highway in South Carolina

South Carolina Highway 46

Route information
- Maintained by SCDOT
- Length: 17.330 mi (27.890 km)
- Existed: 1939–present
- Tourist routes: May River Scenic Byway

Major junctions
- West end: US 321 west of Hardeeville
- US 17 in Hardeeville
- East end: US 278 in Bluffton

Location
- Country: United States
- State: South Carolina
- Counties: Jasper, Beaufort

Highway system
- South Carolina State Highway System; Interstate; US; State; Scenic
← SC 45	→ SC 47

South Carolina Highway 46 (SC 46) is a 17.330-mile-long (27.890 km) state highway in Jasper and Beaufort counties in the Lowcountry region of South Carolina. It connects the rapidly growing communities of Hardeeville and Bluffton and serves as a parallel route to U.S. Route 278 (US 278).

== Route description ==
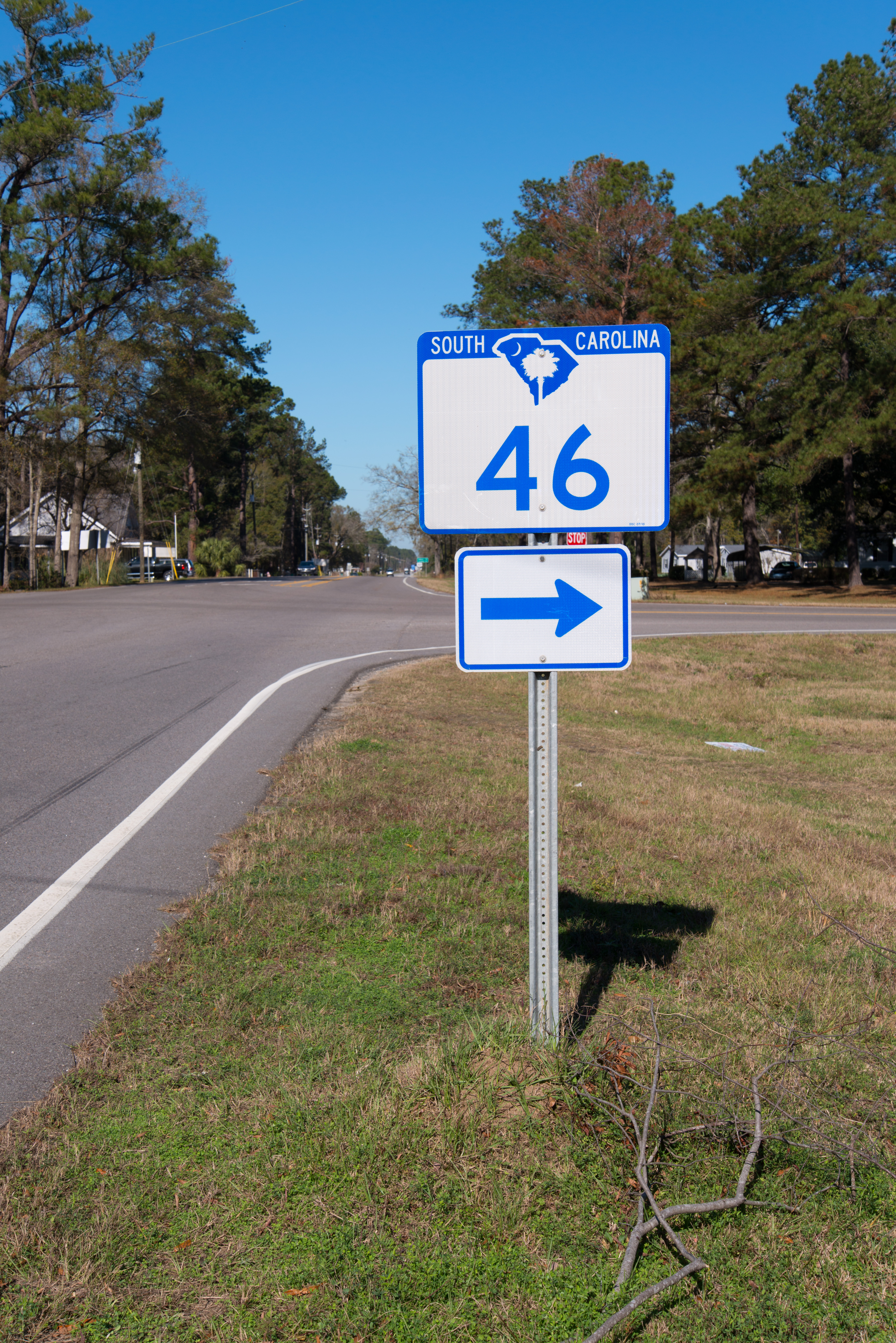
First sign for SC 46 along US 321 near Hardeeville.

Beginning at the intersection with Church Street at US 321 in unincorporated West Hardeeville, the route serves as a marked continuation of Church Street and heads southeast, The road enters the Hardeeville City Limits as it approaches a grade crossing with the CSX Charleston Subdivision as well as a junction to a small lumber yard, then intersects US 17 where Church Street becomes Main Street. Along the way it passes the community library and the city hall, and later runs beneath Interstate 95. Though no direct interchange exists with I-95, a convenient frontage road along the northbound lane provides access south to Exit 5 at US 17, more specifically the northbound on and off ramps of that interchange. Leaving the city limits, Main Street becomes Plantation Drive. Curving from direct southeast to south-southeast, the road widens just before it makes a left turn to the northeast onto SC 170 across from a former section of that route. SC 170 and SC 46 are co-signed for 2.7-mile (4.3 km) crossing the Beaufort County Line in the process where it becomes May River Road until reaching a traffic circle in Pritchardville. SC 170 turns north onto four-lane Oaktie Highway, while SC 46 continues to the east along May River Road.

SC 46 follows May River Road for approximately 8 miles relatively eastbound serving as a designated state scenic byway, with marsh vistas and live oak canopies providing a quintessentially Lowcountry feel to the drive. Briefly turning northeast along the banks of the river that bears the road's name, it has one intersection with Buckwater Parkway, a four-lane divided highway serving developments in the Pritchardville-Hampton Lakes-Okatie area. After this intersection, it eventually curves back to the east. Upon entering Bluffton, the route runs along the northern edges of the original "square mile" or historic town center. Its trajectory along this part of town is short-lived though, as it makes a left turn to the north onto Bluffton Road, which continues south from that intersection as Boundary Street (a former segment of SC 46), while May River Road continues east as Bruin Road which runs towards Burnt Church Road. For 1.7-mile (2.7 km), SC 46 runs northeast along Bluffton Road, but slightly more than halfway along this segment it encounters another traffic circle, this time with Bluffton Parkway. South Carolina Highway 46 ends at US 278 across from a gated community known as "The Crescent."

== History ==
Established in 1939 as a renumbering of part of SC 33, it originally ran from SC 5 near Hardeeville to Bluffton then south to Brighton Beach. In 1956, SC 46 was rerouted at Bluffton: north replacing part of SC 462 then east to a ferry to Hilton Head Island; its old alignment to Brighton Beach became Alljoy Road (S-7-13). In 1957, the ferry to Hilton Head Island was replaced with bridges leaving behind Fording Island Road (S-7-242). By 1967, SC 46 was truncated at its current endpoint north of Bluffton; all east of point became part of US 278.

The first SC 46 was an original state route; from SC 41 in Moncks Corner, to SC 45 in Ferguson. In 1939, SC 46 was renumbered as part of SC 6. Today, much of old SC 46 is under Lake Moultrie.

== Major Intersections ==
County	Location	mi	km	Destinations	Notes
Jasper		0.000	0.000	US 321 (Deerfield Road)	
Jasper	Hardeeville	0.360	0.579	US 17 (Whyte Hardee Boulevard) – Charleston, Savannah	
Jasper		5.630	9.061	SC 170 west – Levy, Limehouse	Western end of SC 170 concurrency
Beaufort	Pritchardville	8.173	13.153	SC 170 east – Beaufort	Eastern end of SC 170 concurrency; roundabout
Beaufort	Bluffton	17.330	27.890	US 278 (Fording Island Road) – Hilton Head Island, Hardeeville	Eastern terminus
1.000 mi = 1.609 km; 1.000 km = 0.621 mi: Concurrency terminus

== South Carolina Highway 46Y ==
South Carolina Highway 46Y
- Location: Hardeeville, South Carolina
- Existed: c.1939–c.1942

South Carolina Highway 46Y (SC 46Y) was a connector that was established by 1940 between U.S. Route 17 (US 17) and SC 46 in Hardeeville. By 1943, it was decommissioned and downgraded to secondary roads.
