= Coosawhatchie, South Carolina =

- Census-designated place
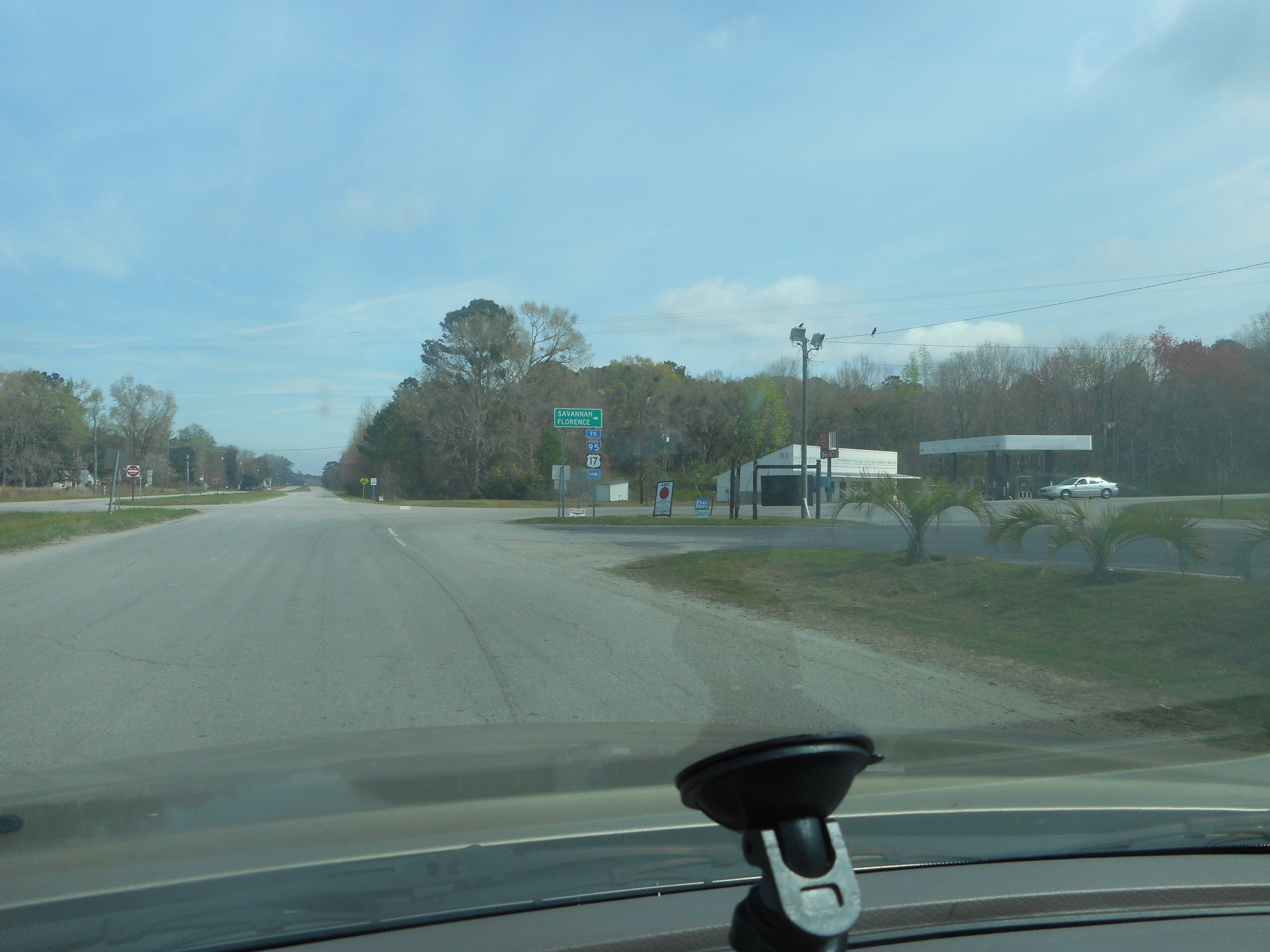
- Former US 17 as it approaches the intersection with SC 462 in Coosawhatchie

- Location within South Carolina Location within the United States
- Coordinates: 32°35′06″N 80°55′58″W
- Country: United States
- State: South Carolina
- County: Jasper

Area
  - Total: 0.60 sq mi (1.55 km^{2})
  - Land: 0.59 sq mi (1.52 km^{2})
  - Water: 0.012 sq mi (0.03 km^{2})
- Elevation: 13 ft (4.0 m)

Population (2020)
  - Total: 57
  - Density: 97.0/sq mi (37.47/km^{2})
- Time zone: UTC-5 (Eastern (EST))
  - Summer (DST): UTC-4 (EDT)
- ZIP Code: 29912
- Area code: 843
- FIPS code: 45-16675
- GNIS feature ID: 2812968

Coosawhatchie (koo-saw-HATCH-ee) is an unincorporated community and census-designated place (CDP) located in Jasper County, South Carolina, United States at the northern head of the Broad River. It served as the headquarters for General Robert E. Lee during the early part of the American Civil War. It was first listed as a CDP in the 2020 census with a population of 57. It is accessible from Interstate 95 via Exit 28.

== History ==
The area derives its name from its original inhabitants, the Coosaw band of Native Americans and their word for river, hatchie. A sub-group of the Muskogees, they spoke a mixture of the Muskogee and Koasati languages. Located on the King's Highway that stretched from Boston to Charleston, Coosawhatchie was settled by trappers in the 1740s. The town grew around a store owned by rice planter brothers, Henry and Daniel DeSaussure. During the American Revolutionary War, much of the town was burned by British forces in 1779. It became the seat of Beaufort District in 1788.

In 1810, the local court of equity was relocated to Coosawhatchie. Seven years later a new courthouse was constructed in town. Designed by British architect William Jay, the two story structure remained in use until 1840, when the county seat was moved to nearby Gillisonville. After 1840 Coosawhatchie declined somewhat due to the perception that its marshy terrain was unhealthy.

During the Civil War, it was the site of several small battles. Robert E. Lee made his headquarters in Coosawhatchie when he was fortifying the coastal defenses of South Carolina and Georgia during late 1861 and early 1862. To protect the railroad bridge in Coosawhatchie against Federal gunboats coming up the Broad River, Lee's troops dug massive earthworks along its banks. Lee bought and named his famous horse Traveller in Coosawhatchie.

In 1912, Coosawhatchie became part of newly created Jasper County.

== Demographics ==
Historical population
Census	Pop.	Note	%±
2020	57		—
U.S. Decennial Census; 2020

Coosawhatchie first appeared as a census designated place in the 2020 U.S. census.

=== 2020 census ===
Coosawhatchie CDP, South Carolina – Racial and ethnic composition Note: the US Census treats Hispanic/Latino as an ethnic category. This table excludes Latinos from the racial categories and assigns them to a separate category. Hispanics/Latinos may be of any race.
Race / Ethnicity (NH = Non-Hispanic)	Pop 2020	% 2020
White alone (NH)	6	10.53%
Black or African American alone (NH)	40	70.18%
Native American or Alaska Native alone (NH)	0	0.00%
Asian alone (NH)	0	0.00%
Pacific Islander alone (NH)	0	0.00%
Other race alone (NH)	0	0.00%
Mixed race or Multiracial (NH)	5	8.77%
Hispanic or Latino (any race)	6	10.53%
Total	57	100.00%

== Transportation ==
=== Roads ===
- I-95, the major north–south highway on the Eastern Seaboard runs through Coosawhatchie. A single diamond interchange serves the community on SC 462 at Exit 28.
- US 17, a principal route connecting Charleston, Savannah and beyond overlaps I-95 between the interchange with I-95 in Ridgeland at Exit 22 until Point South at Exit 33. Until the mid-1970s it ran along Nuna Rock Road which is now a frontage road for I-95.
- SC 462, known locally as Morgandollar Road, runs eastward from its starting point at U.S. 321 in Robertville. Within Coosawhatchie it intersects with Nuna Rock Road (former U.S. 17), then turns south along that road and then east again at Coosaw Scenic Drive before it goes over I-95/US 17 at Exit 28, and continues eastward towards the hamlet of Okatie at SC 170.

=== Rail ===
The CSX Railway's Charleston Subdivision (also known as the Charleston-Savannah Railway) currently operates both freight trains and passenger trains (via Amtrak) along the lines, but do not stop at Coosawhatchie. The line runs west of Nuna Rock Road, having run parallel to it as far south as Ridgeland, then has one grade crossing with Morgandollar Road (SC 462) until crossing a bridge over the Coosawhatchie River and running through the swampland surrounding that river.

== Notable residents ==
- William F. Colcock, politician
- Mary Gordon Ellis, politician, first woman elected to the South Carolina legislature - lived nearby with her husband
- James L. Petigru, politician and judge
