= WCOG =

WCOG may refer to:

- WCOG (AM), a radio station at 1320 AM in Greensboro, North Carolina
- WCOG-FM, a radio station at 100.7 FM in Galeton, Pennsylvania
- WNFO, a radio station at 1430 AM in Hilton Head, South Carolina which held the call sign WCOG from 1986 to 1992
