= South Carolina Highway 462 =

State highway in South Carolina, United States

South Carolina Highway 462

Route information
- Maintained by SCDOT
- Length: 35.920 mi (57.808 km)
- Existed: 1942–present

Major junctions
- West end: US 321 in Robertville
- US 601 in Pineland; US 278 in Gillisonville; I-95 / US 17 near Coosawhatchie
- East end: SC 170 near Chelsea

Location
- Country: United States
- State: South Carolina
- Counties: Jasper, Beaufort

Highway system
- South Carolina State Highway System; Interstate; US; State; Scenic
← SC 460	→ SC 496

South Carolina Highway 462 (SC 462) is a 35.920-mile (57.808 km) primary state highway in the U.S. state of South Carolina. It serves as a circuitous routing through northern and eastern Jasper County.

== Route description ==
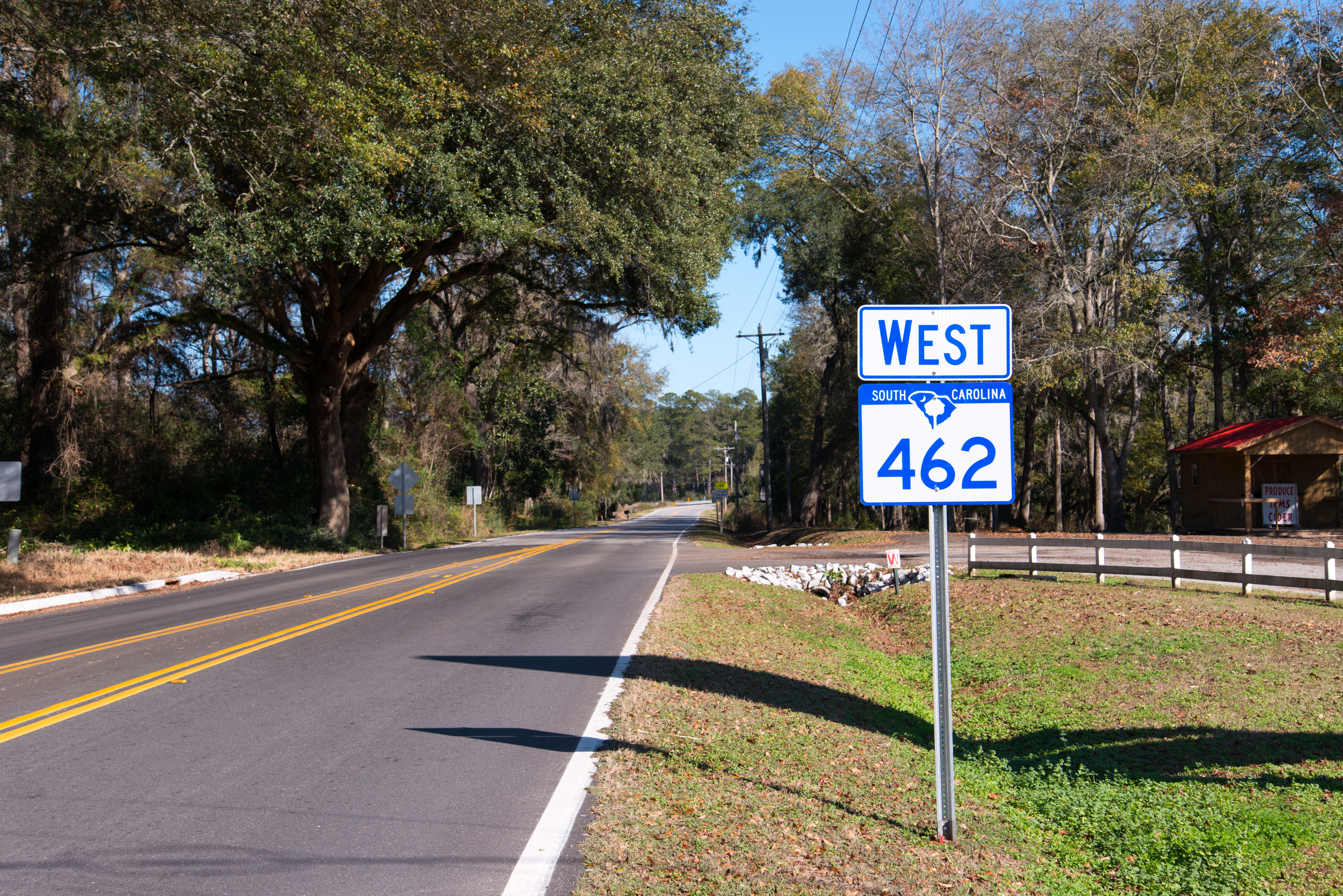
Westbound SC 462 along Coosaw Scenic Highway, in Old House

SC 462 is a rural two-lane highway that makes a half-circle in Jasper County, broken into five named sections of road. The first section named Gillison Branch Road begins at the intersection of U.S. Route 321 (US 321) in Robertville, goes northeast to US 601 in Pineland, then east connecting with US 278 in Gillisonville. The second section named Morgandollar Road connects Gillisonville with Coosawhatchie. The third section, named Nuna Rock Road is a former overlap with US 17 within Coosawhatchie. The fourth section named Coosaw Scenic Drive connects Coosawhatchie with SC 336 in Old House. The fifth section named Lowcountry Drive continues on from SC 336 to its eastern terminus at SC 170 in Beaufort County.

The highway connects to several historic places, including Robertville Baptist Church, Gillisonville Baptist Church and the Old House Plantation. However, it is not scenic as it is predominantly forest or swampland.

== History ==
The highway was established in 1941 or 1942 as a new primary routing from SC 170 to SC 46 in Bluffton, existing entirely in Beaufort County. In 1956, SC 462 ceded some of its routing to SC 46 (Bluffton Road). In 1958, SC 462 was extended north to Coosawhatchie and then west to SC 128 in Gillisonville replacing SC 170. Between 1962 and 1964, SC 462 was extended west again over existing secondary roads to its current western terminus at Robertville; this brought the highway's maximum length to 46 miles (74 km).

Between 1965 and 1967, SC 462 east was truncated to US 278 in Old House, its old alignment south to near Bluffton becoming part of US 278. By 1998, SC 462 was extended south after US 278 realignment to near Hardeeville, reclaiming some of its old routing to SC 170.

== Major intersections ==
County	Location	mi	km	Destinations	Notes
Jasper	Robertville	0.000	0.000	US 321 (Cotton Hill Road) – Estill, Hardeeville	
Jasper	Pineland	2.520	4.056	US 601 (Cypress Branch Road) – Ridgeland, Hardeeville, Hampton	
Jasper	Gillisonville	12.800	20.600	US 278 west (Grays Highway) – Hampton	West end of US 278 overlap
Jasper		13.620	21.919	US 278 east (Grays Highway) – Ridgeland	East end of US 278 overlap
Jasper		18.400	29.612	I-95 / US 17 – Savannah, Florence	I-95 exit 28
Jasper	Old House	27.960	44.997	SC 336 west (Old House Road) – Ridgeland	
Beaufort		35.920	57.808	SC 170 (Okatie Road) – Hilton Head Island, Beaufort	
1.000 mi = 1.609 km; 1.000 km = 0.621 mi: Concurrency terminus
