= Okatie, South Carolina =

- Unincorporated community
- Location within South Carolina Location within the United States
- Coordinates: 32°21′08″N 80°58′41″W
- Country: United States
- State: South Carolina
- Counties: Beaufort, Jasper
- Elevation: 20 ft (6.1 m)

Population (2010)
  - Total: 12,570
- Time zone: UTC-5 (Eastern (EST))
  - Summer (DST): UTC-4 (EDT)
- ZIP code: 29909
- Area codes: 843, 854
- GNIS feature ID: 1231612

Okatie (pronounced "OH-kuh-tee") is an unincorporated suburban community west of Hilton Head Island, located in Beaufort and Jasper counties in the Lowcountry of South Carolina. Okatie takes its name from the nearby Okatee River, an estuary of the Port Royal Sound. The headquarters of the Beaufort-Jasper Water and Sewer Authority are located in Okatie, as are the Beaufort-Jasper Academy for Career Excellence and John Paul II Catholic High School.

Okatie is an unincorporated area stretching from south central Jasper County to western Beaufort County, between I-95 and SC 462. It was designated a voting precinct on March 1, 1916, by the General Assembly of the State of South Carolina. Portions of Okatie have been annexed by Bluffton, Hardeeville and Port Royal. South Carolina Highway 170 (also known as Okatie Highway) is generally considered to be the main route through Okatie.

Okatie has experienced predominantly low-density residential development since the 1990s, including Sun City Hilton Head, Riverbend, and Oldfield. Additional commercial and low intensity industrial development have also occurred, primarily in the Jasper County sections of Okatie. This development pattern has resulted in concerns over water quality and loss of forest habitat for wildlife. Previous efforts to incorporate the community have been unsuccessful, due in part to conflicting opinions on the future of growth and development in the area.

== Demographics ==
Okatie had an estimated population of 36,146 in July, 2024, which has grown a significant 30.5% from its 27,703 in 2020. The population is relatively older, with 24.6% of residents aged 65 and over, while 22.7% are under 18 and 4.4% are under 5 years old. Racially, the community is predominantly White at 76.4%, with Black or African American residents comprising 9.1%, Asian residents 1.4%, Hispanic or Latino residents make up 10.5% of the population.

The area has a high rate of homeownership at 83.4%, with a median home value of $492,100 and median gross rent of $2,256. Educational attainment is relatively high, with 96.8% of residents aged 25 and older holding a high school diploma and 51.9% holding a bachelor’s degree or higher.

== Recreation ==
Okatie and the surrounding Beaufort County area offer a variety of recreational and entertainment opportunities, which are centered around community programs as well as outdoor activities. Residents of Okatie have access to organizations such as the Hilton Head Island Recreation Association, which provides public recreation programs and community events, as well as activities supporting wellness. In addition, facilities such as the Beaufort-Jasper YMCA of the Lowcountry offer fitness classes, youth programs, and social activities to promote healthy lifestyle.
