= Limehouse, South Carolina =

- Unincorporated community
- Location within South Carolina Location within the United States
- Coordinates: 32°12′46″N 81°04′14″W
- Country: United States
- State: South Carolina
- County: Jasper County
- Elevation: 20 ft (6 m)
- Time zone: UTC-5 (Eastern (EST))
  - Summer (DST): UTC-4 (EDT)
- ZIP code: 29927
- Area codes: 843, 854
- GNIS feature ID: 1231480

Limehouse is an unincorporated community in Jasper County, South Carolina, United States. The community is located at the intersection of US 17 and SC 170, 4 miles (6.4 km) south of Hardeeville, 10 miles (16 km) north of Savannah, Georgia and buffered to its west by the Savannah National Wildlife Refuge.
