= Switzerland, South Carolina =

- Unincorporated community
- Location within South Carolina Location within the United States
- Coordinates: 32°25′40″N 81°00′31″W
- State: South Carolina
- County: Jasper
- ZIP Code: 29936
- Area code: 843

Switzerland is an unincorporated community in Jasper County, South Carolina, United States. The community is part of the Hilton Head Island-Bluffton-Beaufort, SC Metropolitan Statistical Area. The community's name comes from Swiss natives who originally came to South Carolina and had settled in the nearby Purrysburg settlement on the banks of the Savannah River, near present-day Hardeeville. Due to competition from Savannah and health issues, many of the settlers moved further inland and created the hamlet. In the past century, the population of the hamlet has dwindled in comparison to growth in Ridgeland and Hardeeville.

Switzerland is located just south of Ridgeland along U.S. Highways 17 and 278. It is accessible from Interstate 95 via exit 18.
