= Jasper County Courthouse =

Jasper County Courthouse may refer to:

- Jasper County Courthouse (Georgia), a courthouse in Monticello, Georgia
- Jasper County Courthouse (Illinois), a courthouse in Newton, Illinois
- Jasper County Courthouse (Indiana), a courthouse in Rensselaer, Indiana
- Jasper County Courthouse (Iowa), a courthouse in Newton, Iowa
- Jasper County Courthouse (Missouri), a courthouse in Carthage, Missouri
- Jasper County Courthouse (South Carolina), a courthouse in Ridgeland, South Carolina
- Jasper County Courthouse (Texas), a courthouse in Jasper, Texas
