= Broad River Bridge =

- Coordinates: 32°23′00″N 80°47′05″W
- Carries: 4–Lanes of SC 170
- Crosses: Broad River
- Locale: Beaufort, South Carolina
- Maintained by: SCDOT

Characteristics
- Design: Box girder bridge
- Total length: 7,308.1 ft.

History
- Opened: 1958; replaced 2004

Statistics
- Daily traffic: 19,400

The Broad River Bridge (also known as the Edward Burton Rogers Bridge) is a 1.7-mile-long (2.7 km) highway bridge that spans the Broad River in Beaufort County, South Carolina. Originally built as a two-lane drawbridge, growth pressures and safety concerns demanded that a larger and taller fixed-span bridge be built. The current four-lane wide structure was completed in 2004 and carries South Carolina Highway 170 as it connects northern and southern sections of Beaufort County. Portions of the previous bridge were purchased by Beaufort County and are now used as a fishing dock. In 2009, landscaping was added to the eastern approaches to the bridge.

== See also ==
- South Carolina Highway 170
- Port Royal Sound
