= Broad River (South Carolina) =

Tidal channel in South Carolina, United States

- Location of mouth

Location
- Country: United States
- State: South Carolina
- County: Beaufort, Jasper

Physical characteristics
- Source
  - coordinates: 32°31′52″N 80°50′53″W
- Mouth
  - coordinates: 32°17′41″N 80°42′17″W
  - elevation: 0 ft (0 m)

The Broad River is a tidal channel in Beaufort and Jasper Counties, South Carolina. The channel flows between the mainland on the west and Port Royal and Parris Island on the east. The Coosawhatchie River flows into the Broad River at the head. It joins Coosaw River channel northeast and continues southeast to the Atlantic Ocean as Port Royal Sound.

S.C. Highway 170 crosses the Broad River on a 1.7-mile bridge, connecting Beaufort and Port Royal with southern Beaufort and Jasper Counties.
