= Jasper County Courthouse (South Carolina) =

- U.S. National Register of Historic Places
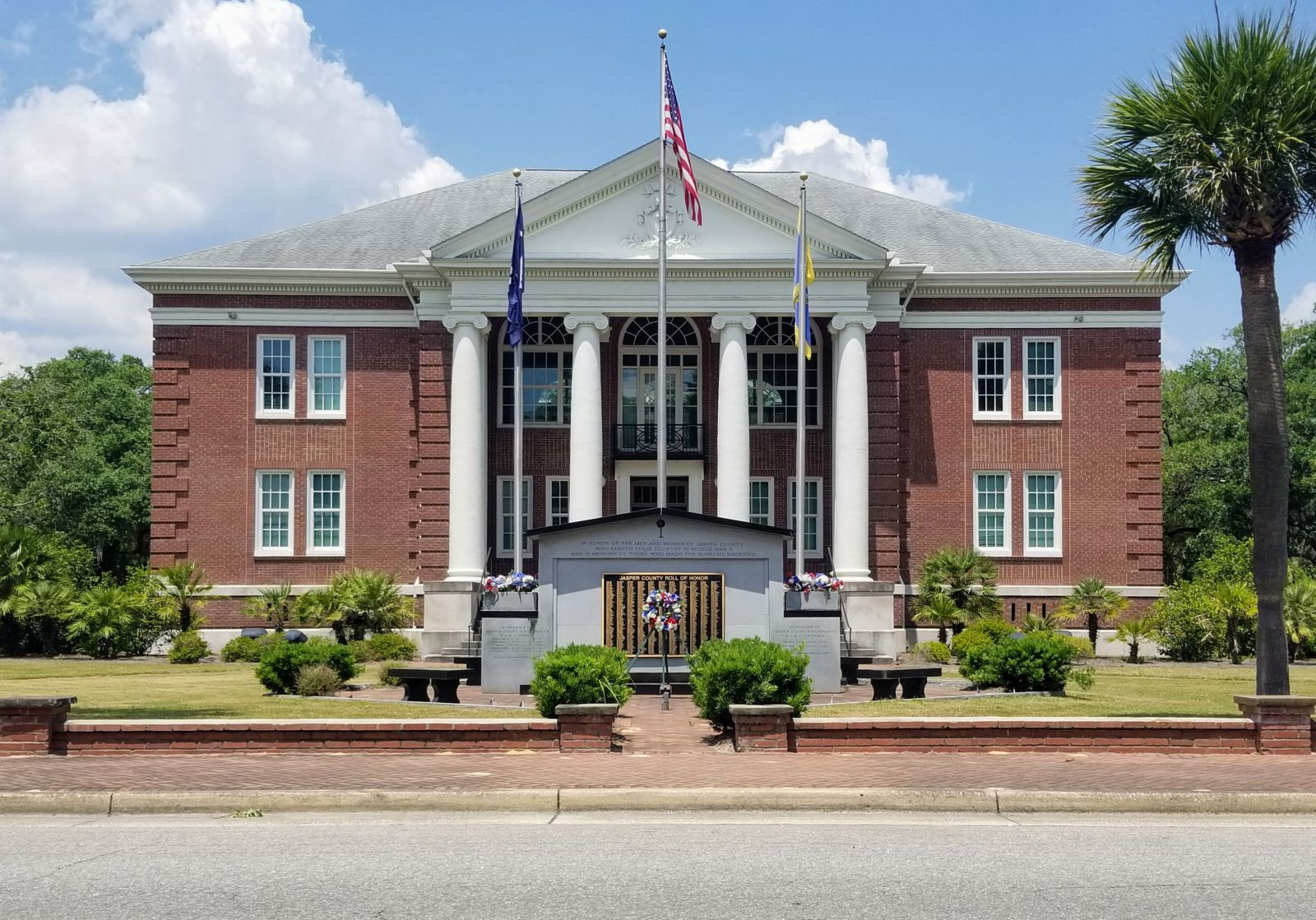

- Location within South Carolina Location within the United States
- Location: 265 Russell St., Ridgeland, South Carolina
- Coordinates: 32°29′3″N 80°59′8″W
- Built: 1915
- Built by: C.V. York
- Architect: William Augustus Edwards
- Architectural style: Colonial Revival
- MPS: Courthouses in South Carolina Designed by William Augustus Edwards TR
- NRHP reference No.: 81000566
- Added to NRHP: October 30, 1981

The Jasper County Courthouse, built in 1915, is an historic courthouse located in the city of Ridgeland in Jasper County, South Carolina. It was designed in the Colonial Revival style by Darlington native William Augustus Edwards who designed eight other South Carolina courthouses as well as academic buildings at 12 institutions in Florida, Georgia and South Carolina. Jasper County was created in 1912 and this is the only courthouse it has ever had, On October 30, 1981, it was added to the National Register of Historic Places.

== See also ==
- List of Registered Historic Places in South Carolina
- Jasper County Courthouse (disambiguation), for other places with the same name
