= St. Luke's Church (Pritchardville, South Carolina) =

Historic church in South Carolina, United States

- U.S. National Register of Historic Places
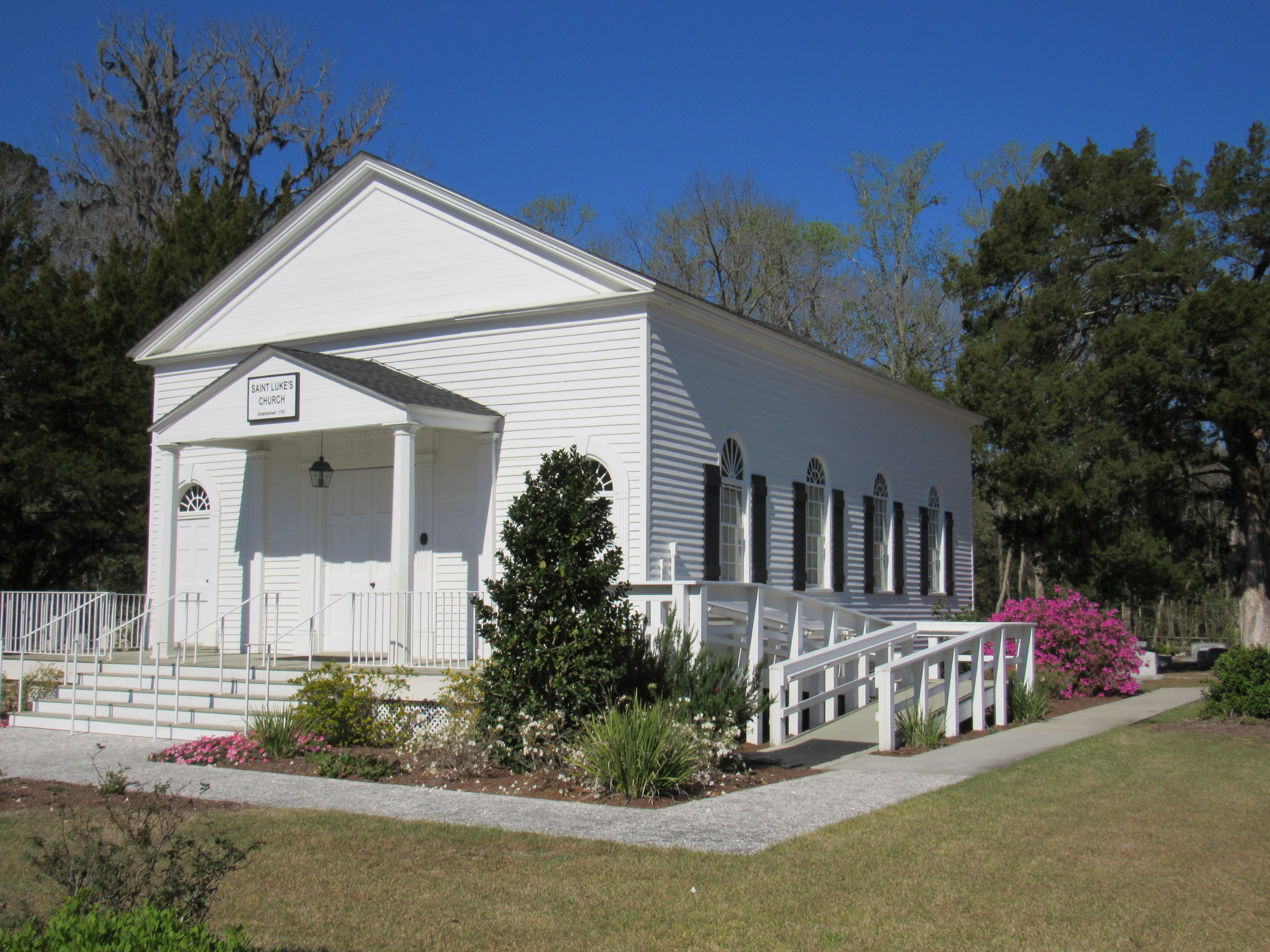

- Location within South Carolina Location within the United States
- Nearest city: Pritchardville, South Carolina
- Coordinates: 32°16′24″N 80°57′0″W
- Area: 2 acres (0.81 ha)
- Built: 1824
- Architectural style: Greek Revival, Georgian
- NRHP reference No.: 87001951
- Added to NRHP: November 10, 1987

St. Luke's Church (Bull Hill Church; St. Luke's Methodist Church) is a historic church in rural Beaufort County, South Carolina located about four miles north of Pritchardville.

The original Episcopal congregation worshipped about a half mile away in a 1786 building built on land donated by John Bull. In 1824 the present building was constructed on land contributed by John Guerard, on part of what had been Bull Hill Plantation. In 1857, the Church of the Cross was built in nearby Bluffton, and services were discontinued around that time. In 1875, the church was sold to the Methodists, who use it to the present day.

The church is noted for its transitional architecture bridging the Georgian style of earlier South Carolina Episcopal churches and the rising Greek Revival style. It is one of the oldest churches in the state built for Episcopal worship, and one of the few with intact slave galleries.

It was added to the National Register of Historic Places in 1987.
