= Grahamville, South Carolina =

Unincorporated community in South Carolina, US

Coordinates: 32°28′27″N 80°57′48″W

Grahamville is an unincorporated community in Jasper County, in the U.S. state of South Carolina.

== History ==
Grahamville had its start as the summer residence of a local landowner. A post office called Grahamville was established in 1830, and remained in operation until 1908.
