= Ridgeland, South Carolina =

- Town
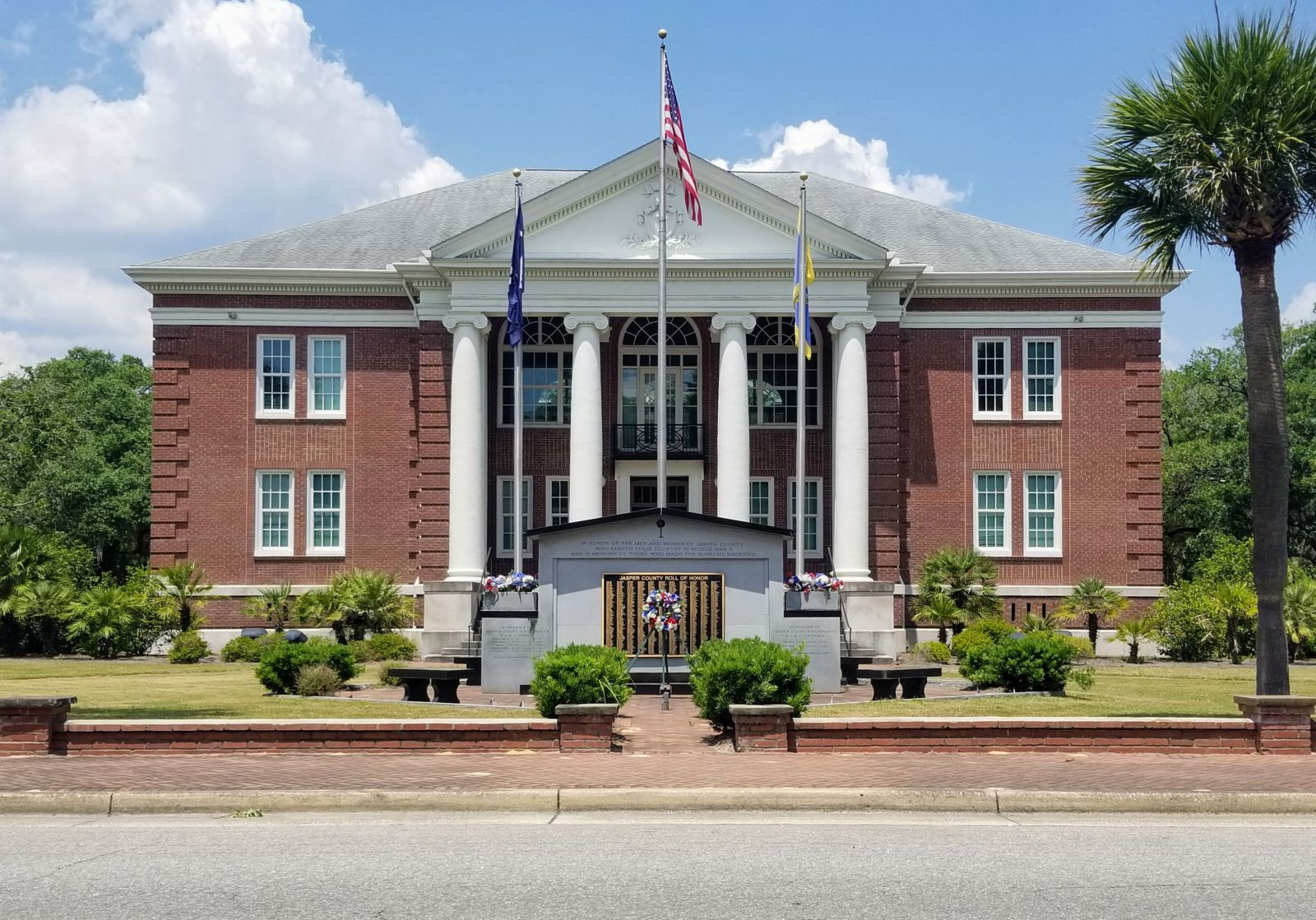
- Jasper County Courthouse

- Seal
- Interactive map of Ridgeland, South Carolina
- Location within South Carolina Location within the United States
- Coordinates: 32°28′58″N 80°54′28″W
- Country: United States
- State: South Carolina
- Counties: Jasper, Beaufort

Area
  - Total: 48.81 sq mi (126.41 km^{2})
  - Land: 48.34 sq mi (125.20 km^{2})
  - Water: 0.47 sq mi (1.21 km^{2})
- Elevation: 16 ft (4.9 m)

Population (2020)
  - Total: 3,758
  - Density: 77.8/sq mi (30.02/km^{2})
- Time zone: UTC-5 (Eastern (EST))
  - Summer (DST): UTC-4 (EDT)
- ZIP codes: 29912, 29936
- Area codes: 843, 854
- FIPS code: 45-60280
- GNIS feature ID: 2407214
- Website: www.ridgelandsc.gov

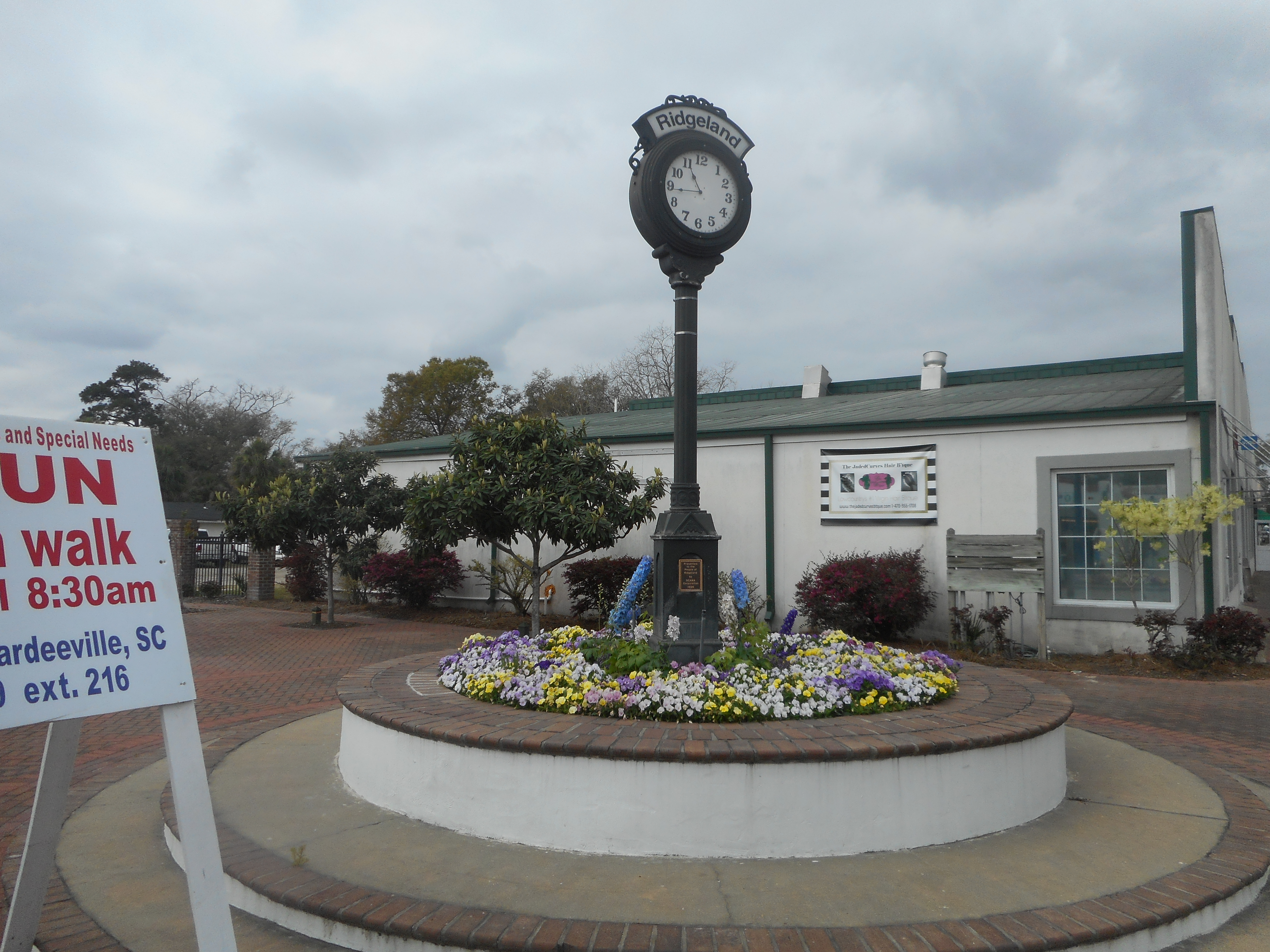
Ridgeland street clock

Ridgeland is a town in and the county seat of Jasper County, South Carolina, United States. The town incorporation limits extend into Beaufort County up to the Broad River. The population was 3,749 at the 2020 census, all of which resided in Jasper County. Ridgeland is included in the Hilton Head Island metropolitan area.

Ridgeland was originally known as "Gopher Hill" in 1894, derived from the gopher tortoise, which is indigenous to the area. The name was not considered good enough for a new railroad station, so it was changed to "Ridgeland" in 1902 by the station ticket master, Frederick Henry Ingram, for the fact that the town stands on a sandy ridge that is some of the highest land in Jasper County. Ridgeland is home to the Ridgeland Correctional Institution, a medium-security prison operated by the South Carolina Department of Corrections.

== Geography ==
Ridgeland is in northeastern Jasper County, with the center of town sitting on a low ridge at an elevation of 62 feet (19 m) above sea level. According to the United States Census Bureau, the town has a total area of 44.7 square miles (115.8 km^{2}), of which 44.4 square miles (115.1 km^{2}) are land and 0.3 square miles (0.7 km^{2}), or 0.59%, are water. The town's area as of 2010 is 18 times greater than its 2000 area of 2.4 square miles (6.3 km^{2}). The town limits extend east into Beaufort County as far as the west bank of the Broad River.

Ridgeland is 36 miles (58 km) southwest of Walterboro, 32 miles (51 km) south of Hampton, 31 miles (50 km) north of Savannah, Georgia, 14 miles (23 km) north of Hardeeville, and 7 miles (11 km) east of Tillman.

== Demographics ==
Historical population
Census	Pop.	Note	%±
1910	330		—
1920	418		26.7%
1930	715		71.1%
1940	1,021		42.8%
1950	1,078		5.6%
1960	1,192		10.6%
1970	1,165		−2.3%
1980	1,143		−1.9%
1990	1,071		−6.3%
2000	2,518		135.1%
2010	4,036		60.3%
2020	3,758		−6.9%
U.S. Decennial Census

=== 2020 census ===
Ridgeland racial composition
Race	Num.	Perc.
White (non-Hispanic)	1,270	33.79%
Black or African American (non-Hispanic)	1,640	43.64%
Native American	3	0.08%
Asian	31	0.82%
Pacific Islander	7	0.19%
Other/Mixed	81	2.16%
Hispanic or Latino	726	19.32%

As of the 2020 census, Ridgeland had a population of 3,758. The median age was 36.4 years. 19.3% of residents were under the age of 18 and 11.7% were 65 years of age or older. For every 100 females, there were 147.7 males, and for every 100 females age 18 and over, there were 172.4 males.

0.0% of residents lived in urban areas, while 100.0% lived in rural areas.

There were 1,041 households in Ridgeland, of which 37.1% had children under the age of 18 living in them. Of all households, 36.7% were married-couple households, 22.3% were households with a male householder and no spouse or partner present, and 34.0% were households with a female householder and no spouse or partner present. About 28.3% of all households were made up of individuals and 12.4% had someone living alone who was 65 years of age or older.

The population density was 1,046.6 inhabitants per square mile (404.1/km^{2}). There were 1,151 housing units, of which 9.6% were vacant. The homeowner vacancy rate was 2.4% and the rental vacancy rate was 6.2%.

=== Income and poverty ===
The median income for a household in the town was $31,991, and the median income for a family was $37,647. Males had a median income of $26,593 versus $14,641 for females. The per capita income for the town was $7,394. About 20.0% of families and 25.2% of the population were below the poverty line, including 32.7% of those under age 18 and 14.5% of those age 65 or over.

== Education ==
Ridgeland is home to Ridgeland Elementary School and Ridgeland-Hardeeville High School. Thomas Heyward Academy, which opened in 1970 as a segregation academy is located inside of the town limits.

== Transportation ==
- I-95, the major north-south highway on the Eastern Seaboard, runs through Ridgeland. A trumpet interchange to a connecting road exists south of the town at Exit 18 north of Switzerland, though the main interchanges within the community are Exits 21 and 22.
- US 17, a principal route connecting Charleston, Savannah, and beyond, enters Ridgeland after passing through Switzerland. The road is known locally as Jacob Smart Boulevard and has an interchange with I-95 at Exit 22, which it joins in an overlap until Point South at Exit 33. The road is mainly four lanes wide, with some segments having a center turn lane, although it becomes a four-lane divided highway north of downtown Ridgeland before joining I-95 in the aforementioned overlap.
- US 278 overlaps US 17 from northern Hardeeville, before veering west onto Third Street and then Grays Highway towards Augusta, Georgia, and Atlanta.
- SC 336, Ridgeland's Main Street, runs eastward from its starting point at U.S. 321 in Tillman. Within Ridgeland it intersects U.S. 17, goes under I-95 at Exit 21, and continues eastward towards the hamlet of Old House at SC 462.

The CSX Railway's Charleston Subdivision (also known as the Charleston-Savannah Railway) currently operates both freight trains and passenger trains (via Amtrak) along the lines, but do not stop at Ridgeland. The line runs along the west side of US 17 until the south end of the I-95 overlap, where it then runs along Nuna Rock Road (Old US 17) until it reaches Coosawhatchie.

== Notable people ==
- Thomas Heyward, Jr., signer of the Declaration of Independence and Articles of Confederation
- LaRue Howard, gospel musician
- Reverend Ike (Frederick J. Eikerenkoetter II), popular and controversial prosperity theology televangelist
- David Into, racing driver
- General Lloyd W. Newton, first African-American pilot in the U.S. Air Force Thunderbirds
- William C. Patrick III, Cold War era microbiologist at Fort Detrick
- General Jacob E. Smart, Cold War era U.S. Air Force general
