= Sun City Hilton Head =

- Unincorporated community
- Del Webb's Sun City Hilton Head
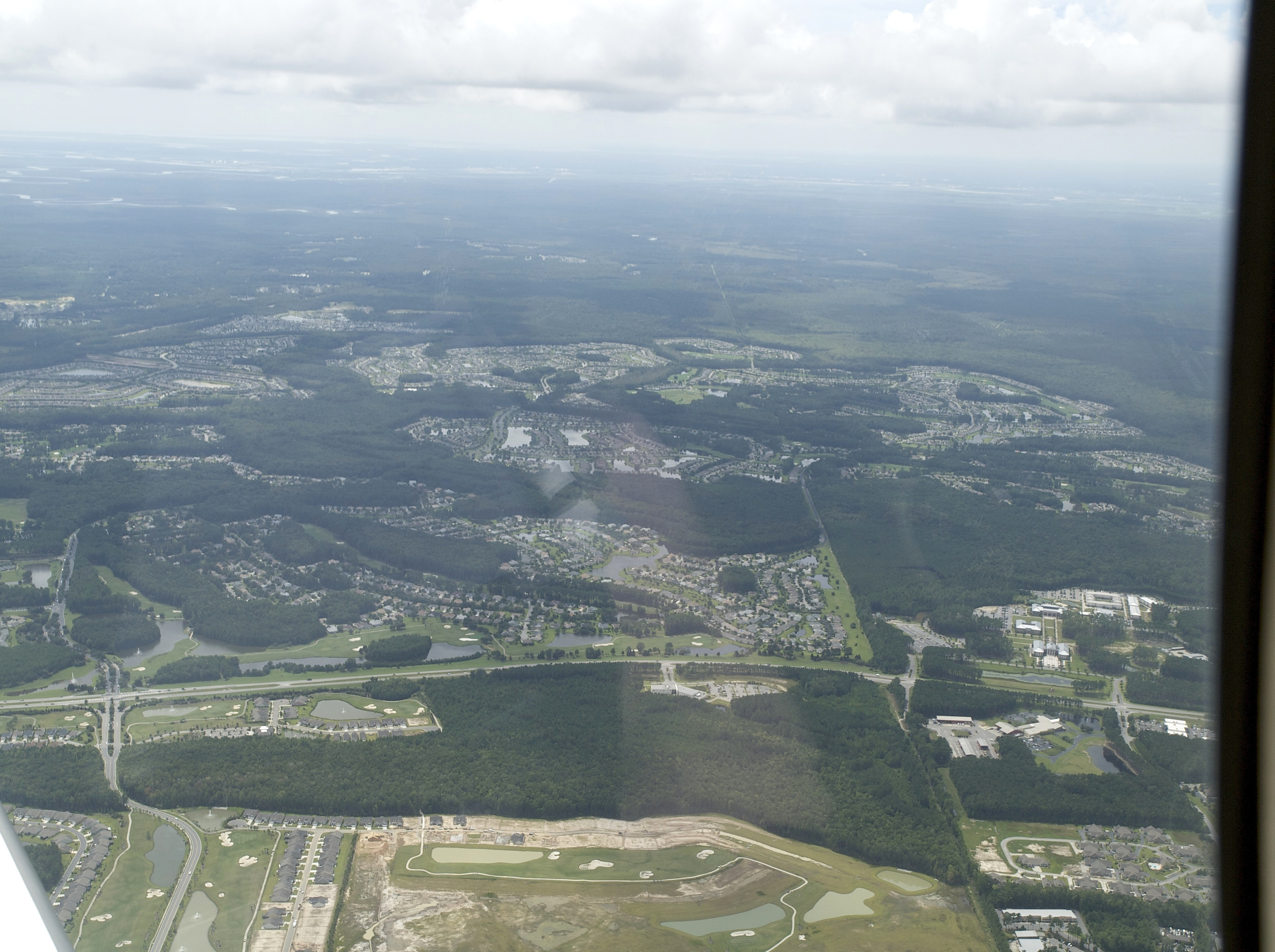
- Sun City Hilton Head, looking south west from 3,500 ft.
- Country: United States
- State: South Carolina
- County: Beaufort, Jasper

Population (2012 est.)
  - Total: 14,000
- Time zone: Eastern (EST)
  - Summer (DST): EDT
- ZIP code: 29909, 29910
- Area codes: 843, 854
- Website: www.suncityhiltonhead.org

Del Webb's Sun City Hilton Head (often shortened to Sun City Hilton Head or Sun City locally) is an age-restricted planned community located in the Okatie area of Beaufort and Jasper counties in the Lowcountry region of South Carolina. Although not a separate incorporated community or census-designated place, there are close to 10,000 permanent residents within three major phases of the community, which is clustered around its golf courses and community centers. Sun City is included within the Hilton Head Island-Bluffton-Beaufort, SC Metropolitan Statistical Area.

== History ==
In early 1992, the Del E. Webb Corporation began looking into the area near Bluffton and Hilton Head Island as part of their nationwide search for the location of a new retirement community. In June 1993, the company announced its interest in purchasing 5,100 acres (2,100 ha) of land from timber company Union Camp. On January 20, 1994, Del Webb announced in a press conference with Governor Carroll Campbell that the project would be going ahead.
