= Hardeeville, South Carolina =

- City
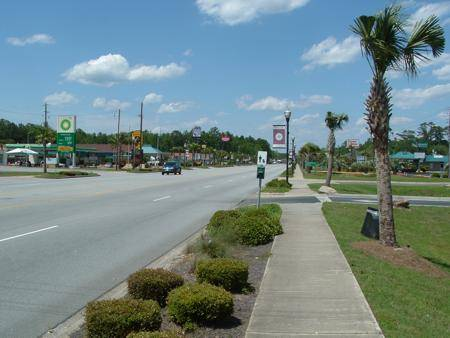
- U.S. Highway 17 in Hardeeville

- Seal Logo
- Interactive map of Hardeeville, South Carolina
- Location within South Carolina Location within the United States
- Coordinates: 32°17′22″N 81°01′43″W
- Country: United States
- State: South Carolina
- Counties: Beaufort, Jasper
- Incorporated: 1911

Area
  - City: 56.82 sq mi (147.17 km^{2})
  - Land: 56.71 sq mi (146.88 km^{2})
  - Water: 0.11 sq mi (0.28 km^{2})
- Elevation: 16 ft (4.9 m)

Population (2020)
  - City: 7,473
  - Density: 131.8/sq mi (50.88/km^{2})
  - Metro: 228,410 (US: 206th)
- Time zone: UTC−5 (Eastern (EST))
  - Summer (DST): UTC−4 (EDT)
- ZIP Codes: 29927; 29909 (portions of); 29936 (portions of)
- Area codes: 843 and 854
- FIPS code: 45-32245
- GNIS feature ID: 2403797
- Sales tax: 8.0%
- Website: hardeevillesc.gov

Hardeeville is a city in Jasper and Beaufort counties in the U.S. state of South Carolina. The population was 7,473 as of the 2020 census, an increase of over 150% since 2010. Hardeeville is included within the Hilton Head Island metropolitan area.

For many years, Hardeeville billed itself as the "Lowcountry Host" due to the prevalence of lodging and traveler-oriented facilities along U.S. Highway 17 and later Interstate 95. In recent years, the city has expanded its economic focus due to high population growth. According to Census estimates, Hardeeville posted the highest population growth rate of any municipality in South Carolina, growing 53.4 percent from 2010 to 2014.

== History ==
Marker indicating the former location of the Purrysburg settlement

The earliest European settlement in the region was Purrysburg, a former Swiss Huguenot settlement founded in 1732 on the banks of the Savannah River, about 2 miles (3 km) northwest of the current city's center. The settlement ultimately failed, as disease and competition from growing Savannah proved too much for the local settlers to overcome. Many left the immediate area, moving elsewhere in the Lowcountry region (including a new hamlet called Switzerland) or upriver to the new communities of Augusta, Georgia, and Hamburg, South Carolina, though some remained.

The area saw some skirmishes between Union and Confederate forces during the Civil War. The Charleston and Savannah Railway (today's CSX Transportation) was considered a prized possession and major strategic goal for Union forces. The Battle of Honey Hill, an effort to defend the railroad, was one of the later battles won by Southern forces in late 1864, shortly before General William Sherman entered South Carolina after his March to the Sea in Georgia.

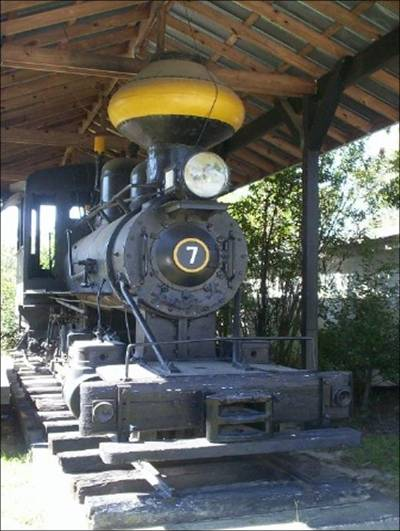
Argent Lumber Company locomotive on display

The area within the city was settled in the 19th century by Isaac Hardee, a native from North Carolina. Through the efforts of his son, Whyte William Hardee, a depot and general store along the Charleston and Savannah Railway opened up. This depot and the surrounding areas became collectively known as "Hardee's Station", and eventually as "Hardeeville" at the town's founding in 1911. The area became renowned for its timber operations with the Argent Lumber Company, which had one of the largest logging operations in the world. Unique to the area was the swamp logging procedure, with conditions that were far more treacherous than standard logging. 3 ft (914 mm) narrow-gauge railroads were constructed to help deliver timber to a processing area, where the lumber would be lifted onto 4 ft 8 1/2 in (1,435 mm) standard gauge rail cars or trucks headed to all parts of North America. As a tribute to Argent's impact on the community, the city was donated an H.K. Porter 2-8-0 steam locomotive (c/n 4776, built January 1911), Argent Lumber Company Number 7, for display in 1960.

Growth continued at a modest pace throughout the rest of the 20th century, though timbering operations were gradually scaled back as overseas lands became more sought after due to lower costs and more standard logging procedures. In spite of the decline of the logging industry, the construction of U.S. Route 17 and later Interstate 95 provided a new type of commerce: motorist services such as motels, restaurants, and gas stations. The development of Hilton Head Island to the southeast as a resort destination had a further impact on the community, with an additional interstate exit providing greater commercial opportunity and affordable costs of living for service employees who moved to the city.

At the start of the 21st century, development pressures along the U.S. Route 278 corridor became a central concern for city leaders. In response, Hardeeville began to annex large undeveloped parcels of land that were previously held by timbering and paper concerns. These annexations were done in order to guide new growth into larger planned developments, increasing the city limits from 5 square miles (13 km^{2}) in 2000 to over 45 square miles (117 km^{2}) in 2010. In 2004, Core Communities became the first company to sign a development agreement with the city and began constructing Tradition Hilton Head. In the following years, other developments have begun or announced plans at developing in these areas. Although the recession beginning in late 2007 significantly slowed the pace of development, the city has continued to grow due to continuous commitments from existing developers, and new investment related to industrial and commercial opportunities. These investments have allowed the city to make improvements to its existing areas in the form of streetscaping projects, improved community facilities, and general reinvestment.

== Geography ==
Hardeeville is located south of the center of Jasper County. According to the United States Census Bureau, the city had a total area of 45.27 square miles (117.25 km^{2}) in 2010, of which 45.16 square miles (116.97 km^{2}) were land and 0.11 square miles (0.28 km^{2}), or 0.24%, were water. Nearly 90 percent of the city limits was annexed between 2000 and 2010, primarily to accommodate large, planned development communities located on former lands devoted to logging and timber harvesting.

The city is located on the Atlantic coastal plain, with very few variations in elevation. The average elevation of the city is approximately 20 feet (6.1 m) above mean sea level. Most of Hardeeville is located within Jasper County, though a small portion of the city crosses into Beaufort County. Much of the city is bordered to the west by the Savannah National Wildlife Refuge, a large-scale nature preserve along the South Carolina and Georgia sides of the Savannah River.

== Neighborhoods ==
Although a small community in terms of population, Hardeeville is among the 10 largest municipalities in South Carolina based on incorporated limits. The city has a small downtown area along with newly developing areas primarily along the U.S. 278 corridor. At the present time, there are two distinct population centers: Downtown and New River.

"Downtown" or "Historic Hardeeville" refers generally to the original city limit extents of the community, bound between Exits 5 and 8 along I-95 and between the interstate and the CSX rail line. Downtown consists mostly of one-story single-family homes and one- to two-story apartments. Main Street (S.C. 46) and Whyte Hardee Boulevard (U.S. 17) provide the majority of commercial development in downtown. Locally oriented commerce is located along Main Street and northern portions of Whyte Hardee Boulevard. Nearby neighborhoods often associated with downtown include Car Moorer Acres, Pine Arbor, Heritage Place, Jenny Greeene, and Deerfield Village.

The "New River" area of Hardeeville contains large-scale planned developments along the U.S. 278 and Argent Boulevard corridors. A vast majority of population growth since 2005 has been attributed to these developments, which were annexed into the city between 2004 and 2010. These developments include Hilton Head Lakes, Hampton Pointe (rebranded 2021 to Riverton Pointe,) Hearthstone Lakes, Latitude Margaritaville and Jasper County portions of Sun City Hilton Head.

== Culture ==
=== Media ===
Hardeeville's weekly newspaper of record is Hardeeville Today, a subsidiary of the Savannah Morning News. Other local newspapers that serve the community include the Jasper County Sun and the Island Packet. The city of Hardeeville also owns and operates a public affairs channel (HTVN Channel 9) that can be seen on Hargray cable services. Broadcast channels shown on local services originate in the Savannah market.

=== Community facilities ===
- Hardeeville City Hall
- Hardeeville Museum (inside City Hall)
- Hardeeville Community Library
- Senior Citizens Center
- Coastal Carolina Hospital
- Hardeeville Recreational Park (sports and recreation fields & courts)
- Hardeeville Veterans Park & Argent Lumber Company Engine 7
- Sgt. Jasper County Park
- The Sarge Disc Golf Course

=== Festivals and events ===
The city hosts celebrations throughout the year to garner community involvement and interest. Among the more notable celebrations are:

- Easter Egg Hunt (March/April)
- SC/GA Barbeque Festival (April)
- Relay for Life (April/May)
- 4th off Main (June/July)
- National Night Out (August)
- Catfish Festival (Third weekend in September annually)
- Christmas Parade and Christmas Tree Lighting (Second Saturday in December)

=== Sports and recreation ===
Through the city's recreation department, youth and adult athletics are sponsored year-round. Activities include football, flag football, basketball, softball, soccer, and cheerleading. Most recreational events take place at the city's recreation complex located behind City Hall.

The city is currently home to the University of South Carolina Beaufort Sand Sharks baseball and softball teams. The Sand Sharks have played at the Richard Gray Baseball Complex since 2008 and will continue games at the facility until a new facility is built on the USCB's south campus in Beaufort County.

=== Religion ===
The city is home to several Christian denominations, with most churches located in the downtown area. Other religious faiths have houses of worship in surrounding communities, especially in Beaufort, Hilton Head, and Savannah.

== Economy ==
Downtown Hardeeville has traditionally been the center of commercial activity in the city, with traveler services along U.S. 17 mixing together with more local-oriented businesses along Main Street. Hardeeville's two exits along Interstate 95 are some of South Carolina's more popular stopping points, with traveler-oriented commercial services. Although Exit 5 has been in existence longer and has more commercial activity, Exit 8 has experienced recent commercial growth as well. Exit 8 also is the access point to the local hospital and a popular county park located within 1-mile (1.6 km) of the exit.

Among industrial and business park locations, the Hardeeville Industrial Park is among the most successful locations in the city, connected both to road and rail networks. Additional light industrial development is occurring in other areas of the city, especially along the Argent Boulevard and Highway 170 corridors.

In addition to existing industrial locations, the proposed RiverPort development on the western and southern edges of the city intends to focus on logistics, transportation, and port-related industrial uses along the U.S. Highway 17 corridor. A future Exit 3 along Interstate 95 is planned to facilitate industrial development in RiverPort and alleviate truck congestion through downtown Hardeeville.

New commercial opportunities are planned for along the U.S. 278 corridor.

== Demographics ==
Historical population
Census	Pop.	Note	%±
1880	252		—
1920	413		—
1930	728		76.3%
1940	1,361		87.0%
1960	700		—
1970	853		21.9%
1980	1,250		46.5%
1990	1,583		26.6%
2000	1,793		13.3%
2010	2,952		64.6%
2020	7,473		153.2%
2025 (est.)	16,459	▲	120.2%
U.S. Decennial Census; 2020

=== 2020 census ===
As of the 2020 census, Hardeeville had a population of 7,473, 3,445 households, and 1,913 families residing in the city.

The median age was 60.4 years. 12.1% of residents were under the age of 18 and 40.1% of residents were 65 years of age or older. For every 100 females there were 92.6 males, and for every 100 females age 18 and over there were 89.7 males age 18 and over.

Of the 3,445 households in Hardeeville, 14.7% had children under the age of 18 living in them. Of all households, 58.5% were married-couple households, 12.2% were households with a male householder and no spouse or partner present, and 23.7% were households with a female householder and no spouse or partner present. About 24.3% of all households were made up of individuals and 12.9% had someone living alone who was 65 years of age or older.

There were 3,951 housing units, of which 12.8% were vacant. The homeowner vacancy rate was 2.9% and the rental vacancy rate was 21.0%.

40.7% of residents lived in urban areas, while 59.3% lived in rural areas.

Racial composition as of the 2020 census
Race	Number	Percent
White	5,074	67.9%
Black or African American	1,025	13.7%
American Indian and Alaska Native	37	0.5%
Asian	82	1.1%
Native Hawaiian and Other Pacific Islander	3	0.0%
Some other race	683	9.1%
Two or more races	569	7.6%
Hispanic or Latino (of any race)	1,281	17.1%

=== 2010 census ===
At the 2010 census, there were 2,952 people, 1,068 households, and 693 families residing in the city. The population density was 59.4 inhabitants per square mile (22.9/km^{2}). There were 1,292 housing units at an average density of 26.0 per square mile (10.0/km^{2}). The racial makeup of the city was 43.7% White, 34.7% African American, 2.0% Asian, 16.1% from other races, and 2.7% from two or more races. There were no people of exclusive Native American or Pacific Islander origin living in the city. Hispanic or Latino residents of any race were 28.4% of the population, one of their highest percentages in South Carolina.

There were 1,068 households, out of which 29.5% had children under the age of 18 living with them, 38.8% were married couples living together, 18.8% had a female householder with no husband present, and 35.1% were non-families. 25.6% of all households were made up of individuals, and 5.2% had someone living alone who was 65 years of age or older. The average household size was 2.76 and the average family size was 3.24.

In the city, 25.4% of the population was under the age of 18 and 7.9% was 65 years of age or older. The median age was 29.3 years. Male residents slightly outnumbered female residents in the total city population (51.7% to 48.3%, respectively).

Based on five-year estimates from the American Community Survey for 2010, the estimated median income for a household in the city was $33,088, and the median income for a family was $36,667. About 32.6% of the population were below the poverty line, including 43.1% of those under age 18 and 46.1% of those age 65 or over.

== Government ==
Hardeeville is governed by an elected, non-partisan city council, with one mayor and four council members. All members are elected to staggered four-year terms and are considered at-large (not representing geographic districts).

The city also has an election commission, a planning commission, a board of zoning appeals, a board of appearances and an accommodations tax board. Meetings from these boards as well as community events and news are broadcast by HTVN, the city's public-access television and government-access television (GATV) cable TV station.

Since 2006, Hardeeville operates under a council-manager form of government. City departments include administration, court, downtown development, finance, fire, media, planning & development, police/court, parks and recreation, and public works.

== Education ==
The Hardeeville South Campus contains two public schools: Hardeeville Elementary (grades K-5) and Hardeeville-Ridgeland Middle School (grades 6-8). The Ridgeland-Hardeeville High School in Ridgeland receives high school students who live in the city and all of Jasper County. Additional schools are planned in the future through development agreements signed by private developers and the city.

A fair number of schoolchildren living in and around Hardeeville attend Royal Live Oaks Academy of Arts & Sciences, a public charter school under the South Carolina Public Charter School District. Opened in August 2012, the school is just beyond the city limits and serves grades K-12. A new school facility for the charter school is expected to be complete in 2015. Private schools in the area include Thomas Heyward Academy, which was founded as a segregation academy, in Ridgeland and St. John Paul II Catholic School in Okatie.

The Hardeeville Community Library is a branch of the Allendale-Hampton-Jasper Regional Library system and serves residents in Hardeeville and southern Jasper County. A new library facility is expected to open in 2015. Two local institutions comprise the current extent of higher education in the Hardeeville area. Both the University of South Carolina Beaufort South Campus and the Technical College of the Lowcountry New River Campus are located just outside the city limits in Beaufort County.

== Infrastructure ==
=== Transportation ===
Hardeeville serves as a major transportation hub for the Lowcountry and Coastal Empire regions, with several major regional transportation links. Listed below are some of the major transportation links that are located in the city.

- I-95, the major north-south highway on the Eastern Seaboard, runs through Hardeeville. Exits 5 and 8 are located in the city and provide numerous motorist services. A South Carolina welcome center is located in the city, shortly before Exit 5 on the northbound lanes. The four-lane interstate is expected to be widened to six lanes from Exit 8 to the state line to help with increasing congestion. A future exit 3 is being planned and will help assist in the flow of traffic around the city and to Bluffton and Hilton Head Island.
- US 17, a principal route connecting Charleston, Savannah and beyond, enters Hardeeville shortly after crossing the Savannah River from Georgia and remains in the city limits for 15 miles (24 km). The road is known locally as Speedway Boulevard for points south of I-95 and as Whyte Hardee Boulevard north of the interstate. U.S. 17 is exit 5 off I-95. The road is mainly four lanes wide, with some segments having a center turn lane, while other segments are limited-access. Sections of two-lane configurations exist in the northern and southern areas of the city.
- US 278, also known as Independence Boulevard, is a heavily traveled thoroughfare connecting Hardeeville and Interstate 95 with Bluffton and Hilton Head Island. As mentioned above, most of the city's major large-scale developments are occurring along this corridor. U.S. 278 is Exit 8 off I-95. Heading north, the route runs concurrent with U.S. 17 until Ridgeland, before veering west toward Augusta, Georgia and Atlanta.
- US 321, also known as Deerfield Highway, is a lightly traveled route for cars, yet serves as a commercially important link for trucks heading for the Port of Savannah. From its starting point/terminus at U.S. 17 near Interstate 95, the route heads northward toward Columbia, South Carolina; Charlotte, North Carolina; and Knoxville, Tennessee.
- SC 46, known locally as Main Street, runs eastward from its starting point at U.S. 321 over the CSX rail line, intersects U.S. 17, goes under I-95, and continues eastward towards Bluffton, passing by the hamlet of Pritchardville and the new development of Palmetto Bluff. The route provides a more scenic and less traveled alternative to U.S. 278.
- SC 170, known locally as Okatie Highway, Freedom Parkway, and Alligator Alley, runs generally northeast to southwest, connecting Hardeeville with Beaufort and northern Beaufort County as well as Port Wentworth and the northern suburbs of Savannah. The highway also goes through the neighboring rural communities of Okatie and Levy, as well as the Savannah National Wildlife Refuge.

CSX Transportation's Charleston Subdivision (also known as the Charleston-Savannah Railway) currently operates both freight trains and passenger trains (via Amtrak) along the lines, but do not stop at Hardeeville.

Local public transportation and dial-a-ride service is provided by Palmetto Breeze, a regional transportation authority run by the Lowcountry Council of Governments, which serves as the regional Metropolitan Planning Organization (MPO).

=== Utilities ===
Since 2005, water and sewer services are provided by the regional Beaufort-Jasper Water and Sewer Authority (BJWSA), based in Okatie. South Carolina Electric and Gas Company (SCE&G) and Palmetto Electric Cooperative are the major suppliers of power to the city. Hargray provides telephone and broadband services. Republic Waste provides solid waste services.
