= Savannah National Wildlife Refuge =

Protected area in Georgia, U.S.

- IUCN category IV (habitat/species management area)
- Location within Georgia
- Location: Georgia and South Carolina, United States
- Nearest city: Savannah, Georgia
- Coordinates: 32°11′50.6580″N 81°7′13.0800″W
- Area: 29,175 acres (118.07 km^{2})
- Established: 1927; 99 years ago
- Visitors: 130,000 (in 2004)
- Governing body: U.S. Fish and Wildlife Service
- Website: Savannah National Wildlife Refuge

The Savannah National Wildlife Refuge is a 31,551-acre (12,768 ha) National Wildlife Refuge located in Chatham and Effingham counties in Georgia and Jasper County in South Carolina. Of the total area, 15,395 acres (6,230 ha) is in Georgia and 15,263 acres (6,177 ha) is in South Carolina. The refuge was established to provide sanctuary for migratory waterfowl and other birds and as a nature and forest preserve for aesthetic and conservation purposes.

The refuge is one of seven refuges administered by the Savannah Coastal Refuges Complex in Hardeeville, South Carolina. The complex has a combined staff of 25 with a fiscal year 2018 budget of roughly $3,000,000.

== History ==
The first European visitors to the Savannah, Georgia area arrived in 1526. James Oglethorpe established the city of Savannah in 1733. By the mid-eighteenth century, rice planters were farming much of the land that is now part of the refuge. The old rice levees, which were built by hand, form the basis for current impoundment dikes. Remnants of the original rice field trunk water control structures and narrow dikes are still visible in some places. Within the impoundment system there are 36 historic and prehistoric archeological sites which have been located and inventoried.

On April 6, 1927, Executive Order No. 4626 established the Savannah River Bird Refuge and set aside 2,352 acres (952 ha) as a preserve and breeding ground for native birds. On November 12, 1931, Executive Order No. 5748 added 207 acres (84 ha) to the refuge and renamed the area the Savannah River Wildlife Refuge. An additional 6,527 acres (2,641 ha) were assigned to the refuge on June 17, 1936, by Executive Order No. 7391. On July 25, 1940, Presidential Proclamation 2416 renamed the refuge the Savannah National Wildlife Refuge.

These three Executive Orders established the 9,086-acre (3,677 ha) core of the present refuge; subsequent acquisition using Federal Duck Stamp funds and other special funding added 3,557 acres (1,439 ha). An additional 459 acres (186 ha) were added when the fee title to Hog Marsh Island and adjacent lands to the north were acquired through an exchange of spoilage rights with Chatham County, Georgia. In 1964, Savannah Electric and Power Company deeded 34 acres (14 ha) to the refuge in exchange for a power line right-of-way. In 1978, the 12,472-acre (5,047 ha) Argent Swamp tract was purchased from Union Camp Corporation using Land and Water Conservation Funds. Bear Island (687 acres) was purchased in fee title, from a private individual, on October 19, 1993. In order to straighten the east boundary, two tracts totaling 54 acres (22 ha) were purchased from Union Camp Corporation on August 27, 1996. The Barrows tract (535 acres), which lies adjacent to the southeast boundary, was purchased in fee title during 1998. Another tract of land was added onto the mid-western portion of the refuge; the Solomon tract was purchased in 1999 and is 887 acres (359 ha). The total current refuge area is 29,174 acres (11,806 ha).

== Topography ==
The refuge is located in the heart of the Lowcountry, a band of low land, bordered on the west by sandhill ridges and on the east by the Atlantic Ocean, extending from Georgetown, South Carolina to St. Mary's, Georgia.

There are 38 miles (61 km) of river and over 25 miles (40 km) of streams and creeks within the refuge boundaries. Refuge habitats include bottomland hardwoods, palustrine, estuarine and tidal freshwater wetlands. Managed freshwater impoundments make up about 3,000 acres (1,200 ha).

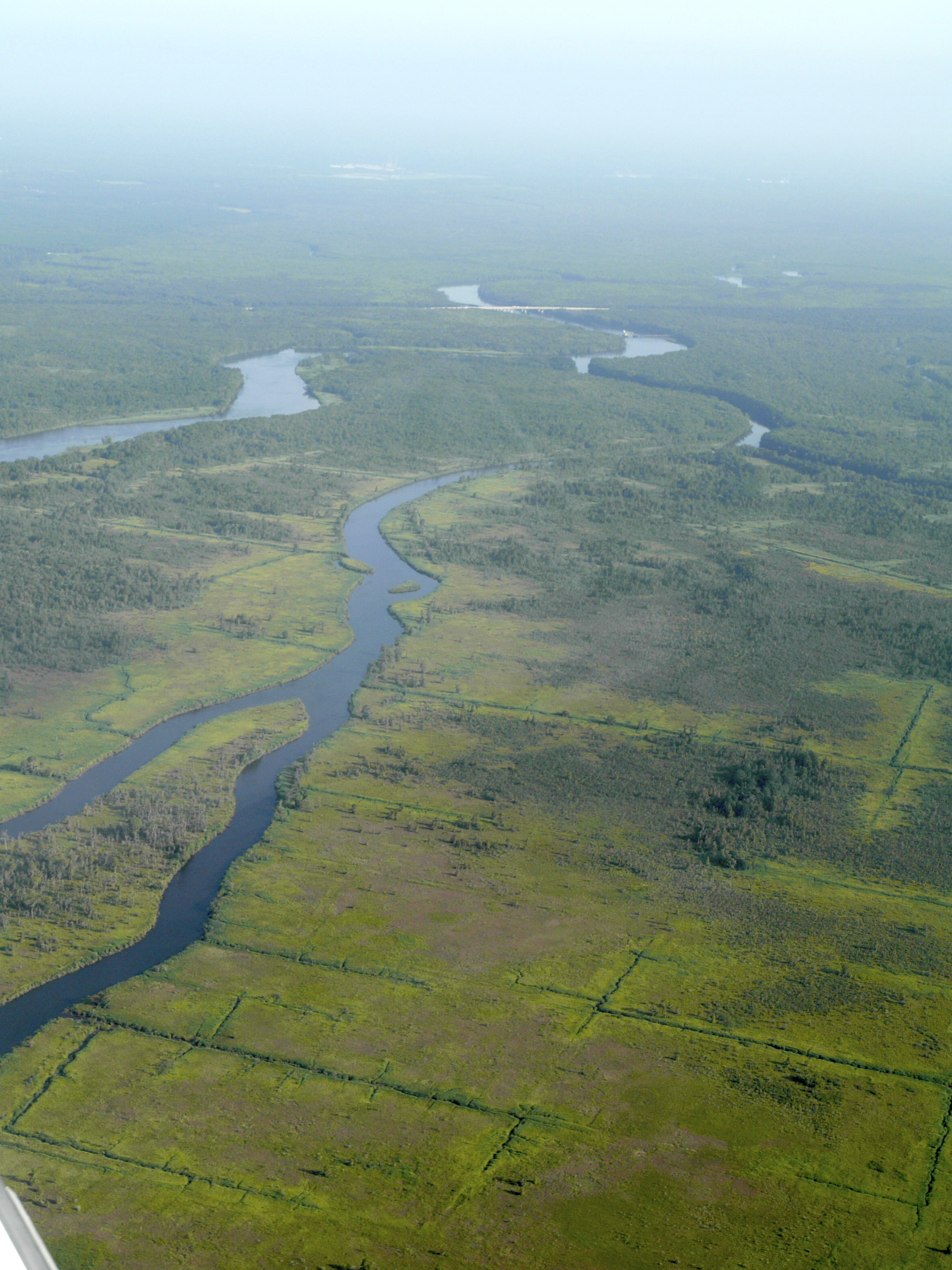
View of the northern section of the Savannah National Wildlife Refuge.

== Wildlife and protected species ==
Known for its rich flora during the humid summer months, the region also supports a diverse wildlife population. The variety of birdlife within the Lowcountry is enhanced by its location on the Atlantic Flyway. During the winter months, thousands of mallards, pintails, teal and as many as ten other species of ducks migrate into the area, joining resident wood ducks on the refuge. In the spring and fall, transient songbirds stop briefly on their journey to and from northern nesting grounds.

The refuge is home to a large variety of wildlife including: ducks, geese, wading birds, and shorebirds. Several threatened and endangered species are protected on the refuge, including the American alligator, flatwoods salamander, bald eagle, wood stork, shortnose sturgeon, and Florida manatee. The refuge also provides nesting areas for wood ducks, great horned owls, osprey and swallow-tailed kites.

== Facilities ==
A visitor center on the South Carolina side of the refuge opened in March, 2010, at 694 Beech Hill Lane, Hardeeville, approximately eight miles south of Hardeeville and seven miles from downtown Savannah, GA on US Hwy 17. The Visitor Center features exhibits describing the history and denizens of the refuge, an introductory video, and "The Gator Hole", a nature and book store. The Visitor Center is currently open from 10AM until 2PM Monday thru Friday, closed on Saturday, Sunday and all Federal holidays. The trails around the Visitor Center are open for hiking from dawn until dusk. There are opportunities for hiking, cycling, photography and wildlife observation. Pets are not allowed in the refuge.

All dikes are open to foot travel during daylight hours, unless otherwise posted, and provide excellent wildlife observation points. The Cistern Trail, Tupelo Trail and other walking routes are also available to the visiting public.

The Laurel Hill Wildlife Drive is open from dawn until dusk every day. This one-way loop meanders along 4.5 miles (7.2 km) of earthen dikes through managed freshwater pools and hardwood hammocks. The dikes and pools are remnants of pre-Civil War rice plantations.

Fishing is permitted in the freshwater pools from March 1 to November 30 and is governed by South Carolina and refuge regulations. The refuge administers a variety of hunts during the fall and winter. Hunt regulations and schedules are available at the Visitor Center and on the web at http://www.fws.gov/refuge/savannah.

== Volunteer opportunities ==
Volunteers play an important role in supporting and enhancing refuge operations. Volunteers staff the information desk and "The Gator Hole" at the Visitor Center, help with invasive species eradication, do trash pickup and other routine maintenance, participate in ongoing wildlife management activities, and advocate for the refuges before governmental agencies.

== See also ==
- List of National Wildlife Refuges
- Amazon Venture oil spill
- Ward Allen
