= Pritchardville, South Carolina =

Unincorporated community in South Carolina, US

Coordinates: 32°14′17″N 80°57′51″W

Pritchardville is an unincorporated community in Beaufort County, South Carolina, United States, located between Hardeeville and Bluffton on South Carolina Highway 46. The community takes its name from nearby Pritchard Farms.

Pritchardville was originally built up chiefly by settlers from Ohio.

Nearby St. Luke's Church was listed on the National Register of Historic Places in 1987.
