= Port Royal Sound =

Atlantic Ocean inlet in South Carolina

Coordinates: 32°15′43″N 80°40′41″W

Port Royal Sound is a coastal sound, or inlet of the Atlantic Ocean, located in the Sea Islands region, in Beaufort County in the U.S. state of South Carolina. It is the estuary of several rivers, the largest of which is the Broad River.

== Geography ==
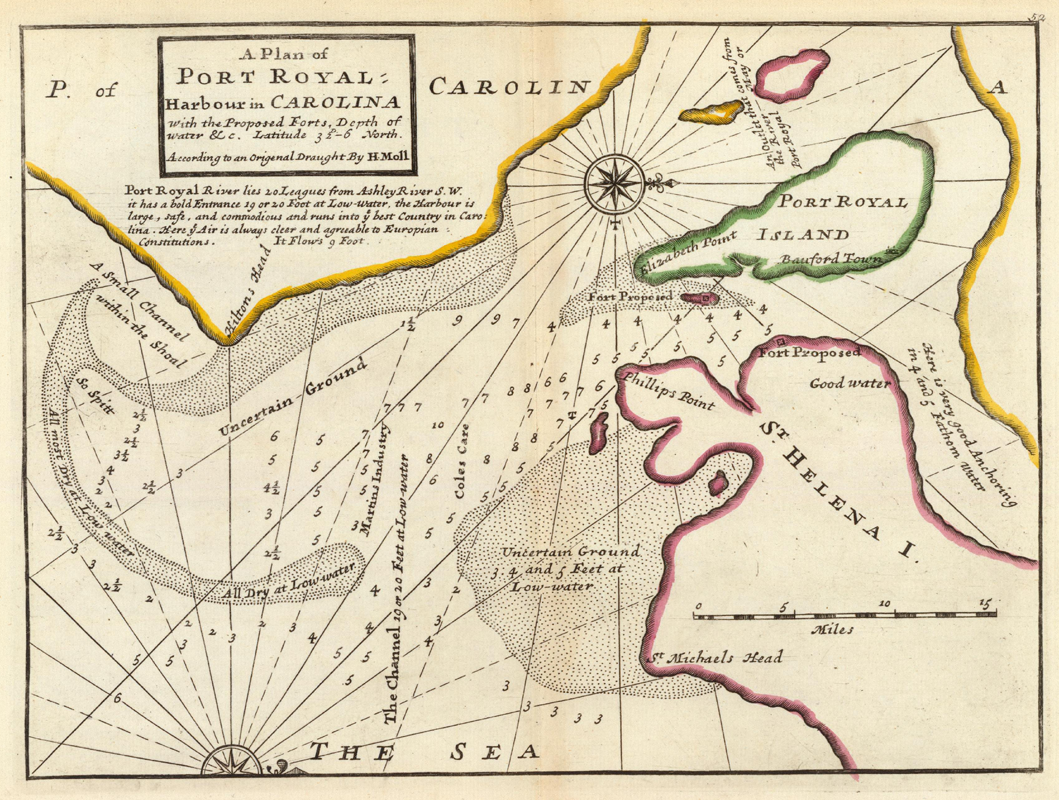
Herman Moll: A Plan of Port Royal-Harbour in Carolina, 1736

Port Royal Sound is located between Hilton Head Island to the south and, to the north, Port Royal Island, Saint Helena Island, Parris Island, and other smaller islands. The Marine Corps Recruit Depot Parris Island facility is located on Parris Island.

Several rivers flow into Port Royal Sound, most notably the Broad River. Other rivers that contribute to Port Royal sound include the Coosawhatchie River, Colleton River, Chechessee River, and Pocotaligo River, among others.

Many waterways called rivers in the Sea Islands region are more akin to tidal straits, connecting bays and estuaries and separating islands. Port Royal Sound is connected to other coastal waterbodies via channels of this type. For example, the Beaufort River separates Port Royal Island and St Helena Island, while connecting Port Royal Sound Saint Helena Sound via Brickyard Creek and the Coosaw River. Skull Creek and Mackay Creek separate Hilton Head Island from the mainland, while connecting Port Royal Sound to Calibogue Sound. A waterway called Whale Branch separates Port Royal Island from the mainland, while connecting Port Royal Sound and the Broad River to Saint Helena Sound, via the Coosaw River.

The town of Port Royal and the city of Beaufort are located on Port Royal Island.

The Intracoastal Waterway passes through Port Royal Sound.

== History ==
Spanish explorers sent by Lucas Vázquez de Ayllón in 1521, and de Ayllón himself in 1526, were probably the first Europeans to visit Port Royal Sound, although there is debate over their exact routes.

Port Royal Sound was named in 1562 by Jean Ribault, who founded a short-lived Huguenot colony at the bequest of the French admiral Gaspard de Coligny, called Charlesfort, on Parris Island. Port Royal Sound is thus the second oldest surviving French place-name in the U.S. In 1566 Pedro Menéndez de Avilés founded the settlement of Santa Elena in the Port Royal Sound area. It remained an important Spanish colony until about 1587.

In 1663 the Province of Carolina was founded. While Charles Town became the colony's center, the Port Royal Sound area was important strategically and economically from the colony's earliest years.

In the early 1684 a group of about 150 Scottish immigrants founded a settlement called Stuarts Town on the shores of Port Royal Sound. After these colonists encouraged the Yamasee Indians to begin raiding Spanish Florida the Spanish retaliated and, in 1686, destroyed Stuarts Town.

Port Royal was one of the first British settlements established in the colony of South Carolina. Beaufort, founded around 1710, became the island's main settlement and the island became the core of St. Helena Parish.

The Yamasee Indians were South Carolina's most important native ally between about 1685 and 1715. They were an amalgamated confederation of the remnants of earlier tribes such as the Guale and Tama. Having been allies and enemies of both the Spanish and the British over time, and having moved widely throughout the southeast, by 1710 the Yamasee had settled in about ten towns in the Port Royal area. The names of some of the towns survive to the present as placenames, including Altamaha, Chechessee, Pocotaligo, and Huspah. Relations with South Carolina deteriorated in the early 18th century until the Yamasee decided to change sides. After the Yamasee War of 1715 they, and many other Indians of the Port Royal regions, moved south of the Savannah River, mostly becoming Spanish allies. This left South Carolina's southern frontier exposed, leading to the construction of several forts and the eventual establishment of the new colony of Georgia.

Fort Frederick was built on Port Royal Island in the 1730s. Today the Fort Frederick Heritage Preserve contains the remains.

Two weeks after October 19, 1861, The Roanoke, which would also carry 700 New York troops, included 1000 barrels of dried apples, bacon, bread, coffee, flour, pickles and pork, and 380 barrels and boxes of beans, bread, coffee, flour, pork, potatoes, rice, salt, sugar and vinegar, for troop rations, (plus 63 boxes of soap, supplied by the Colgate company). The Roanoke was one of 16 steamships of the Naval expedition that carried 15,000 Union troops south from Annapolis to capture Port Royal Sound, South Carolina. Single sheet 12x7½" to Capt. M.R. Morgan, U.S. Army Commissioner of Subsistence. October 19, 1861.

Port Royal Sound was the first large amphibious operation of the Civil War. a significant victory that gave the Union a strategic Southern harbor between Savannah and Charleston. When occupation troops landed after the Naval battle, Southern planters in the vicinity fled, leaving behind thousands of their Black slaves now freed from enslavement, and joined, after the Emancipation Proclamation, by thousands of other escaped slaves from points South. This became the nucleus of the first community of self-governing freedmen in America.

During the American Civil War the Union naval commander Samuel Francis Du Pont reduced the forts guarding Port Royal Sound. It remained in Union control for the rest of the war and became a major naval base.

Fort Fremont was an Endicott Program coast defense fort on St. Helena Island from 1899 to 1921.

According to the United States Geological Survey (USGS), variant and historical names for Port Royal Sound include Brayne Sound, Winneau River, Weenea River, Portus Regalis, Port Royal River, and Port Royal Entrance.

== See also ==
- Scottish colonization of the Americas § Stuarts Town, Carolina – 1684
- Waterways forming and crossings of the Atlantic Intracoastal Waterway
- USS Port Royal
