= Levy, South Carolina =

Coordinates: 32°12′11″N 81°01′44″W

Levy (/ˈliːvi/ LEE-vee) is an unincorporated community located in the southern portions of Jasper County, South Carolina, United States. Levy is accessible via South Carolina Highway 315 and used to be served by the now-abandoned Seaboard Air Line Charleston Subdivision. Levy is 13 feet in elevation and is in the Eastern Time Zone (UTC -5 hours).
