= Jasper County, South Carolina =

County in South Carolina, United States

- County
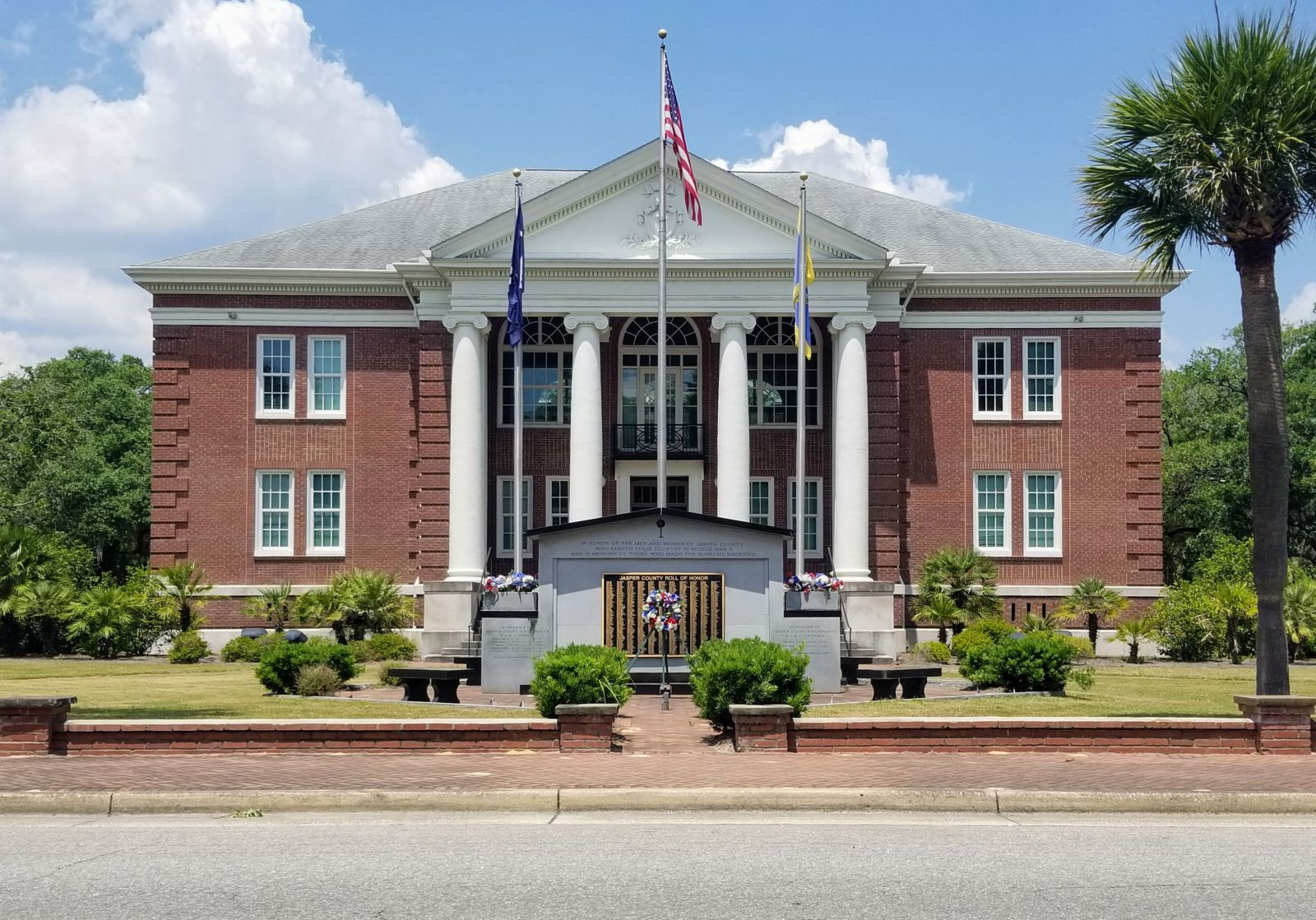
- Jasper County Courthouse

- Flag Seal

- Location within the U.S. state of South Carolina
- Interactive map of Jasper County, South Carolina
- Coordinates: 32.43°N 81.02°W
- Country: United States
- State: South Carolina
- Founded: 1912
- Named for: William Jasper
- Seat: Ridgeland
- Largest community: Hardeeville

Area
  - Total: 701.58 sq mi (1,817.1 km^{2})
  - Land: 655.16 sq mi (1,696.9 km^{2})
  - Water: 46.42 sq mi (120.2 km^{2}) 6.62%

Population (2020)
  - Total: 28,791
  - Estimate (2025): 38,533 ▲
  - Density: 43.945/sq mi (16.967/km^{2})
- Time zone: UTC−5 (Eastern)
  - Summer (DST): UTC−4 (EDT)
- Congressional districts: 1st, 6th
- Website: www.jaspercountysc.gov

Jasper County is the southernmost county in the U.S. state of South Carolina. As of the 2020 census, the population was 28,791. Its county seat is Ridgeland and its largest community is Hardeeville. The county was formed in 1912 from portions of Hampton County and Beaufort County. Jasper County is included in the Hilton Head Island-Bluffton-Port Royal, SC Metropolitan Statistical Area. It is located in the Lowcountry region of the state. As of 2026, it was the fastest growing county in the United States.

== History ==
The county was founded in 1912 and was named after William Jasper. The county seat is Ridgeland while the largest community is Hardeeville. The county is also in the Hilton Head Island-Bluffton-Port Royal, SC Metropolitan Statistical Area.

For several decades, in contrast to neighboring Beaufort County, Jasper was one of the poorest counties in the state. Recent development from 2000 onwards has given the county new residents, expanded business opportunities, and a wealthier tax base. In 2026, estimates released by the US Census Bureau found it to be the fastest growing county in the United States, from 29,000 residents in 2020 to 38,000 in 2026, growing by nearly 33% in about 6 years and comprising many retirees.

== Geography ==
According to the U.S. Census Bureau, the county has a total area of 701.58 square miles (1,817.1 km^{2}), of which 655.16 square miles (1,696.9 km^{2}) is land and 46.42 square miles (120.2 km^{2}) (6.62%) is water.

=== National protected areas ===
- Savannah National Wildlife Refuge (part)
- Tybee National Wildlife Refuge

=== State and local protected areas/sites ===
- Frampton Plantation House
- Kingfisher Pond Recreation Area
- Old House Plantation
- Tillman Sand Ridge Heritage Preserve/Wildlife Management Area
- Turtle Island Wildlife Management Area

=== Major water bodies ===
- Atlantic Ocean (North Atlantic Ocean)
- Intracoastal Waterway
- Little Black River
- Middle River
- Okatee River
- Savannah River
- Tulifiny River

=== Adjacent counties ===
- Hampton County – north
- Beaufort County – east
- Chatham County, Georgia – south
- Effingham County, Georgia – west

== Demographics ==
Historical population
Census	Pop.	Note	%±
1920	9,868		—
1930	9,988		1.2%
1940	11,011		10.2%
1950	10,995		−0.1%
1960	12,237		11.3%
1970	11,885		−2.9%
1980	14,504		22.0%
1990	15,487		6.8%
2000	20,678		33.5%
2010	24,777		19.8%
2020	28,791		16.2%
2025 (est.)	38,533	▲	33.8%
U.S. Decennial Census; 1790–1960 1900–1990; 1990–2000 2010 2020

=== 2020 census ===
As of the 2020 census, the county had a population of 28,791 people, 11,272 households, and 7,298 families residing in the county. The median age was 43.1 years. 19.8% of residents were under the age of 18 and 22.6% of residents were 65 years of age or older. For every 100 females there were 100.9 males, and for every 100 females age 18 and over there were 100.1 males age 18 and over.

10.9% of residents lived in urban areas, while 89.1% lived in rural areas.

Of these households, 26.2% had children under the age of 18 living with them and 29.2% had a female householder with no spouse or partner present. About 26.8% of all households were made up of individuals and 12.3% had someone living alone who was 65 years of age or older.

There were 12,862 housing units, of which 12.4% were vacant. Among occupied housing units, 71.7% were owner-occupied and 28.3% were renter-occupied. The homeowner vacancy rate was 1.8% and the rental vacancy rate was 13.8%.

=== Racial and ethnic composition ===
Jasper County, South Carolina – Racial and ethnic composition Note: the US Census treats Hispanic/Latino as an ethnic category. This table excludes Latinos from the racial categories and assigns them to a separate category. Hispanics/Latinos may be of any race.
Race / Ethnicity (NH = Non-Hispanic)	Pop 1980	Pop 1990	Pop 2000	Pop 2010	Pop 2020	% 1980	% 1990	% 2000	% 2010	% 2020
White alone (NH)	6,165	6,496	8,374	9,263	13,056	42.51%	41.94%	40.50%	37.39%	45.35%
Black or African American alone (NH)	8,169	8,872	10,852	11,303	9,559	56.32%	57.29%	52.48%	45.62%	33.20%
Native American or Alaska Native alone (NH)	14	20	64	49	59	0.10%	0.13%	0.31%	0.20%	0.20%
Asian alone (NH)	11	30	89	169	187	0.08%	0.19%	0.43%	0.68%	0.65%
Native Hawaiian or Pacific Islander alone (NH)	x	x	9	5	23	x	x	0.04%	0.02%	0.08%
Other race alone (NH)	8	0	13	21	108	0.06%	0.00%	0.06%	0.08%	0.38%
Mixed race or Multiracial (NH)	x	x	87	215	720	x	x	0.42%	0.87%	2.50%
Hispanic or Latino (any race)	137	69	1,190	3,752	5,079	0.94%	0.45%	5.75%	15.14%	17.64%
Total	14,504	15,487	20,678	24,777	28,791	100.00%	100.00%	100.00%	100.00%	100.00%

The racial makeup of the county (allocating Hispanics amongst the separate racial categories) was 47.6% White, 33.5% Black or African American, 0.5% American Indian and Alaska Native, 0.7% Asian, 0.1% Native Hawaiian and Pacific Islander, 10.5% from some other race, and 7.1% from two or more races. Hispanic or Latino residents of any race comprised 17.6% of the population.

=== 2010 census ===
At the 2010 census, there were 24,777 people, 8,517 households, and 5,944 families living in the county. The population density was 37.8 inhabitants per square mile (14.6 inhabitants/km^{2}). There were 10,299 housing units at an average density of 15.7 units per square mile (6.1 units/km^{2}). The racial makeup of the county was 46.0% black or African American, 43.0% white, 0.7% Asian, 0.5% American Indian, 0.1% Pacific islander, 8.3% from other races, and 1.4% from two or more races. Those of Hispanic or Latino origin made up 15.1% of the population. In terms of ancestry, 7.1% were Irish, and 2.5% were American.

Of the 8,517 households, 36.9% had children under the age of 18 living with them, 44.2% were married couples living together, 18.6% had a female householder with no husband present, 30.2% were non-families, and 24.8% of all households were made up of individuals. The average household size was 2.73 and the average family size was 3.23. The median age was 34.6 years.

The median income for a household in the county was $37,393 and the median income for a family was $45,800. Males had a median income of $31,999 versus $24,859 for females. The per capita income for the county was $17,997. About 14.2% of families and 21.5% of the population were below the poverty line, including 32.2% of those under age 18 and 14.5% of those age 65 or over.

=== 2000 census ===
At the 2000 census, there were 20,678 people, 7,042 households, and 5,091 families living in the county. The population density was 32 people per square mile (12 people/km^{2}). There were 7,928 housing units at an average density of 12 units per square mile (4.6 units/km^{2}). The racial makeup of the county was 52.69% Black or African American, 42.39% White, 0.37% Native American, 0.44% Asian, 0.05% Pacific Islander, 3.39% from other races, and 0.67% from two or more races. 5.75% of the population were Hispanic or Latino of any race.

There were 7,042 households, out of which 34.5% had children under the age of 18 living with them, 48.1% were married couples living together, 18.2% had a female householder with no husband present, and 27.7% were non-families. 23.2% of all households were made up of individuals, and 8.8% had someone living alone who was 65 years of age or older. The average household size was 2.75 and the average family size was 3.22.

In the county, the population was spread out, with 26.8% under the age of 18, 10.3% from 18 to 24, 30.7% from 25 to 44, 21.2% from 45 to 64, and 11.0% who were 65 years of age or older. The median age was 34 years. For every 100 females, there were 111.0 males. For every 100 females age 18 and over, there were 111.3 males age 18 and over.

The median income for a household in the county was $30,727, and the median income for a family was $36,793. Males had a median income of $29,407 versus $21,055 for females. The per capita income for the county was $14,161. About 15.4% of families and 20.7% of the population were below the poverty line, including 26.3% of those under age 18 and 21.4% of those age 65 or over.

== Law and government ==
Jasper County is governed by a five-member partisan county council, who are elected in staggered four year terms. The council appoints a county administrator who is tasked with running the day-to-day operations of the county, with the exception of the Sheriff's Office.

Mary Gordon Ellis, the first woman elected to the South Carolina legislature, represented Jasper County in the state senate for one term, from 1928 to 1932, after having served as state superintendent of schools.

=== Politics ===
Like most counties in the rural Black Belt of South Carolina, Jasper has long leaned Democratic. However, in 2024, Donald Trump was able to flip the county Republican for the first time since Richard Nixon carried it in 1972.

United States presidential election results for Jasper County, South Carolina
Year	Republican		Democratic		Third party(ies)	
Year	No.	%	No.	%	No.	%
1912	0	0.00%	198	100.00%	0	0.00%
1916	0	0.00%	243	100.00%	0	0.00%
1920	0	0.00%	219	100.00%	0	0.00%
1924	0	0.00%	89	69.53%	39	30.47%
1928	5	4.67%	102	95.33%	0	0.00%
1932	11	2.68%	399	97.32%	0	0.00%
1936	4	0.88%	452	99.12%	0	0.00%
1940	41	8.93%	418	91.07%	0	0.00%
1944	18	3.96%	230	50.66%	206	45.37%
1948	31	3.49%	141	15.90%	715	80.61%
1952	800	55.71%	636	44.29%	0	0.00%
1956	403	31.71%	210	16.52%	658	51.77%
1960	779	51.93%	721	48.07%	0	0.00%
1964	1,593	61.39%	1,002	38.61%	0	0.00%
1968	633	20.31%	1,402	44.99%	1,081	34.69%
1972	1,650	57.21%	1,203	41.71%	31	1.07%
1976	1,221	29.49%	2,903	70.12%	16	0.39%
1980	1,617	32.54%	3,312	66.65%	40	0.80%
1984	3,102	45.09%	3,753	54.56%	24	0.35%
1988	2,004	40.66%	2,894	58.71%	31	0.63%
1992	1,725	29.93%	3,453	59.92%	585	10.15%
1996	2,024	31.29%	4,053	62.66%	391	6.05%
2000	2,414	37.32%	3,646	56.36%	409	6.32%
2004	2,933	42.84%	3,840	56.09%	73	1.07%
2008	3,365	38.01%	5,389	60.87%	100	1.13%
2012	4,169	41.60%	5,757	57.45%	95	0.95%
2016	5,187	45.39%	5,956	52.12%	284	2.49%
2020	7,078	49.17%	7,185	49.92%	131	0.91%
2024	9,900	54.32%	8,144	44.68%	183	1.00%

== Economy ==
In 2022, the GDP was $1.7 billion (about $49,980 per capita), and the real GDP was $1.3 billion (about $39,745 per capita) in chained 2017 dollars.

As of April 2024, some of the largest employers in the county include AmeriGas, the city of Hardeeville, Publix, and Walmart.

Employment and Wage Statistics by Industry in Jasper County, South Carolina - Q3 2023
Industry	Employment Counts	Employment Percentage (%)	Average Annual Wage ($)
Accommodation and Food Services	740	6.6	23,920
Administrative and Support and Waste Management and Remediation Services	956	8.6	45,968
Agriculture, Forestry, Fishing and Hunting	111	1.0	63,336
Arts, Entertainment, and Recreation	170	1.5	41,236
Construction	1,801	16.1	70,252
Educational Services	594	5.3	53,560
Finance and Insurance	110	1.0	61,048
Health Care and Social Assistance	2,094	18.7	34,580
Information	24	0.2	99,476
Management of Companies and Enterprises	288	2.6	58,396
Manufacturing	295	2.6	37,336
Mining, Quarrying, and Oil and Gas Extraction	385	3.4	63,648
Other Services (except Public Administration)	850	7.6	59,852
Professional, Scientific, and Technical Services	173	1.5	62,244
Public Administration	1,752	15.7	49,296
Real Estate and Rental and Leasing	174	1.6	51,480
Retail Trade	172	1.5	97,968
Transportation and Warehousing	293	2.6	70,720
Utilities	21	0.2	83,916
Wholesale Trade	173	1.5	70,344
Total	11,176	100.0%	51,570

== Transportation ==
=== Major highways ===
- I-95
- US 17
- US 278
- US 278 Conn.
- US 321
- US 601
- SC 3
- SC 46
- SC 170
- SC 315
- SC 336
- SC 336 Conn.
- SC 462
- SC 652

=== Railroads ===
CSX Transportation's Charleston Subdivision (also known as the Charleston-Savannah Railway) currently operates both freight trains and passenger trains (via Amtrak) along the line, but does not stop anywhere within the county. The line also runs along the Hampton-Jasper County border northeast of the bridge over the Tullifinny River.

Another active CSX line within the county is the Columbia Subdivision which bisects the northwest corner of Jasper County between the Georgia state line and Hampton County. This line also operates freight as well as Amtrak passenger trains.

== Communities ==
=== City ===
- Hardeeville (largest community)

=== Town ===
- Ridgeland (county seat)

=== Census-designated places ===
- Coosawhatchie
- Gillisonville

=== Unincorporated communities ===
- Grahamville
- Grays
- Levy
- Limehouse
- Okatie
- Old House
- Pineland
- Pocotaligo
- Point South
- Robertville
- Switzerland
- Tarboro
- Tillman
- Wagon Branch

== See also ==
- List of counties in South Carolina
- National Register of Historic Places listings in Jasper County, South Carolina
- Jasper Ocean Terminal, planned deepwater container port in the county
