= South Carolina Lowcountry =

Geographic and cultural region located along South Carolina's coast

Coordinates: 33.1260618°N 80.0087746°W

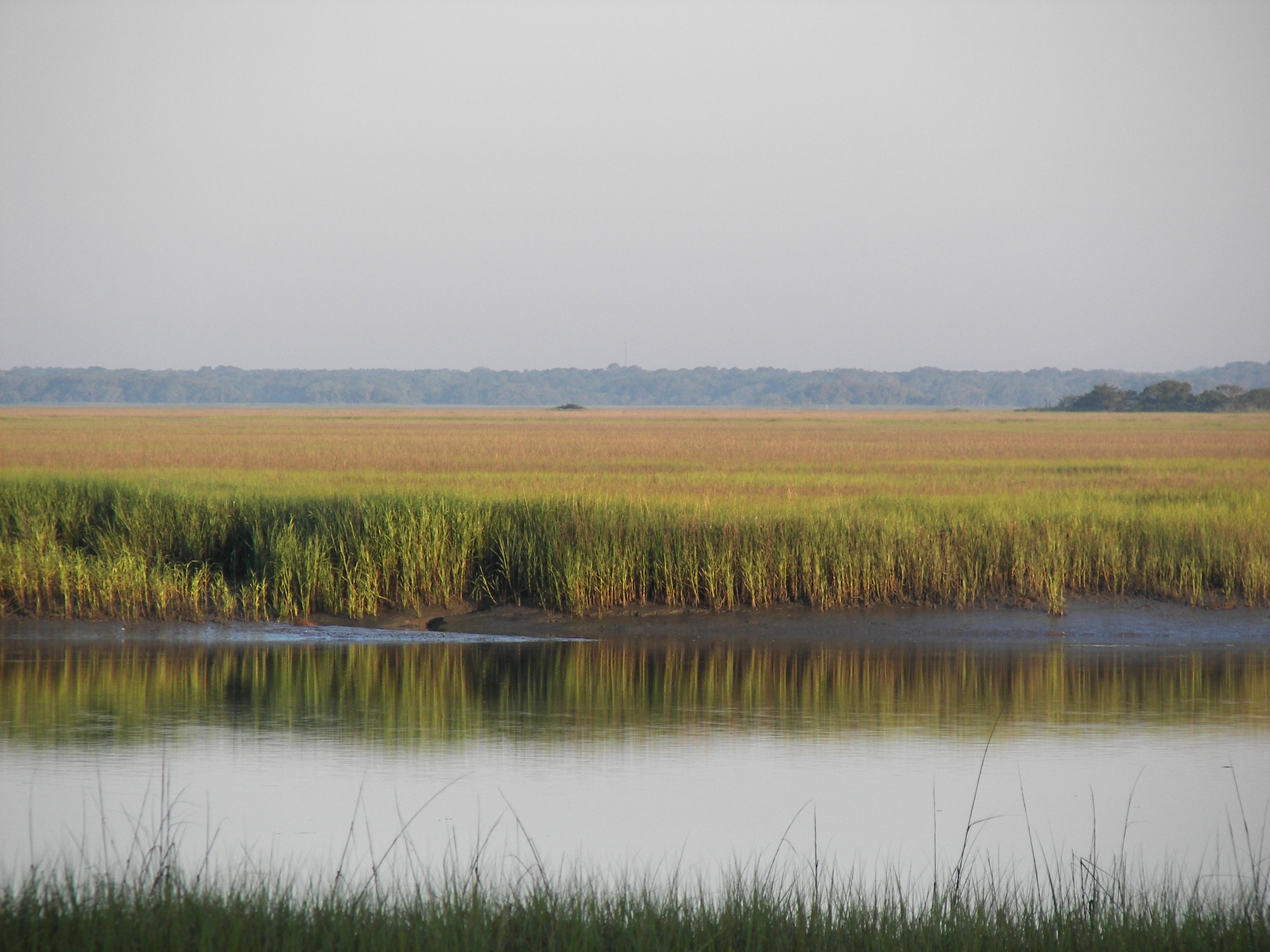
A scenic vista from an observation area at Hunting Island State Park near Beaufort. Such salt marshes are emblematic of the Lowcountry and its landscapes, but are also vulnerable to climate change caused sea level rise and development of tourism and housing.

The Lowcountry (sometimes Low Country or just low country) is a geographic and cultural region along South Carolina's coast, including the Sea Islands. The region includes significant salt marshes and other coastal waterways, making it an important source of biodiversity in South Carolina.

Once known for its slave-based agricultural wealth in rice and indigo, crops that flourished in the hot subtropical climate, the Lowcountry is today known for its historic cities and communities, natural environment, cultural heritage, and tourism industry. Several dozen Native American tribes had inhabited the area, including the Cusabo (and sub tribes) and Etiwan. Demographically, the Lowcountry is still heavily dominated by African American communities, such as the Gullah/Geechee people.

As of the 2020 census, the population of the Lowcountry was 1,167,139.

== Geography ==
Definitions of the "Lowcountry" area always include the counties in dark red, less often those in lighter shades.

The term "Low Country" originally referred to all of the state below the Fall Line, or the Sandhills, which run the width of the state from Aiken County to Chesterfield County. The Sandhills, or Carolina Sandhills, is a 15–60 km (9.3–37.3 mi) wide region within the Atlantic Coastal Plain province, along the inland margin of this province. The Carolina Sandhills are interpreted as eolian (wind-blown) sand sheets and dunes that were mobilized episodically approximately 75,000 to 6,000 years ago. Most of the published luminescence ages from the sand are coincident with the last glaciation, a time when the southeastern United States had colder air temperatures and stronger winds. The area above the Sandhills is known as "Upstate" or "Upcountry". These areas are different in geology, geography, and culture.

There are several variations in the geographic extent of the "Lowcountry" area. The most commonly accepted definition includes Charleston, Dorchester, Beaufort, Georgetown, Colleton, Hampton, Berkeley, Jasper, and Williamsburg counties, often described as the area encompassing the basins of Cooper River, Santee River, ACE (Ashepoo-Combahee-Edisto), Winyah Bay, and Savannah River. Some include Marion and Horry Counties. Dillon County is included in the Lowcountry by the largest group of healthcare executives in the state. Allendale is also occasionally included in the region.

Four counties are covered by the Lowcountry Council of Governments, a regional governmental entity charged with regional and transportation planning, and are the ones included in the South Carolina Department of Parks, Recreation, and Tourism's "Lowcountry and Resort Islands" area. The area includes the Hilton Head Island-Bluffton-Beaufort, SC Metropolitan Statistical Area.

Technically, the Lowcountry is synonymous with the areas with a large population of Gullah Geechee peoples of the region. Gullah Geechee people have traditionally resided in the coastal areas and the sea islands of North Carolina, South Carolina, Georgia and Florida—from Pender County, North Carolina, to St. Johns County, Florida.

Coastal South Carolina’s half a million acres of salt marsh, which typifies the Lowcountry in particular, is underlain by plough mud or pluff mud, named for the traditional spelling of plow but now often pronounced to rhyme with rough. Once used to fertilize fields of cotton, the mud is pervaded by decaying organic matter and bacteria that feed on it, giving it a notoriously sulfurous stench.

== Lowcountry gentry ==
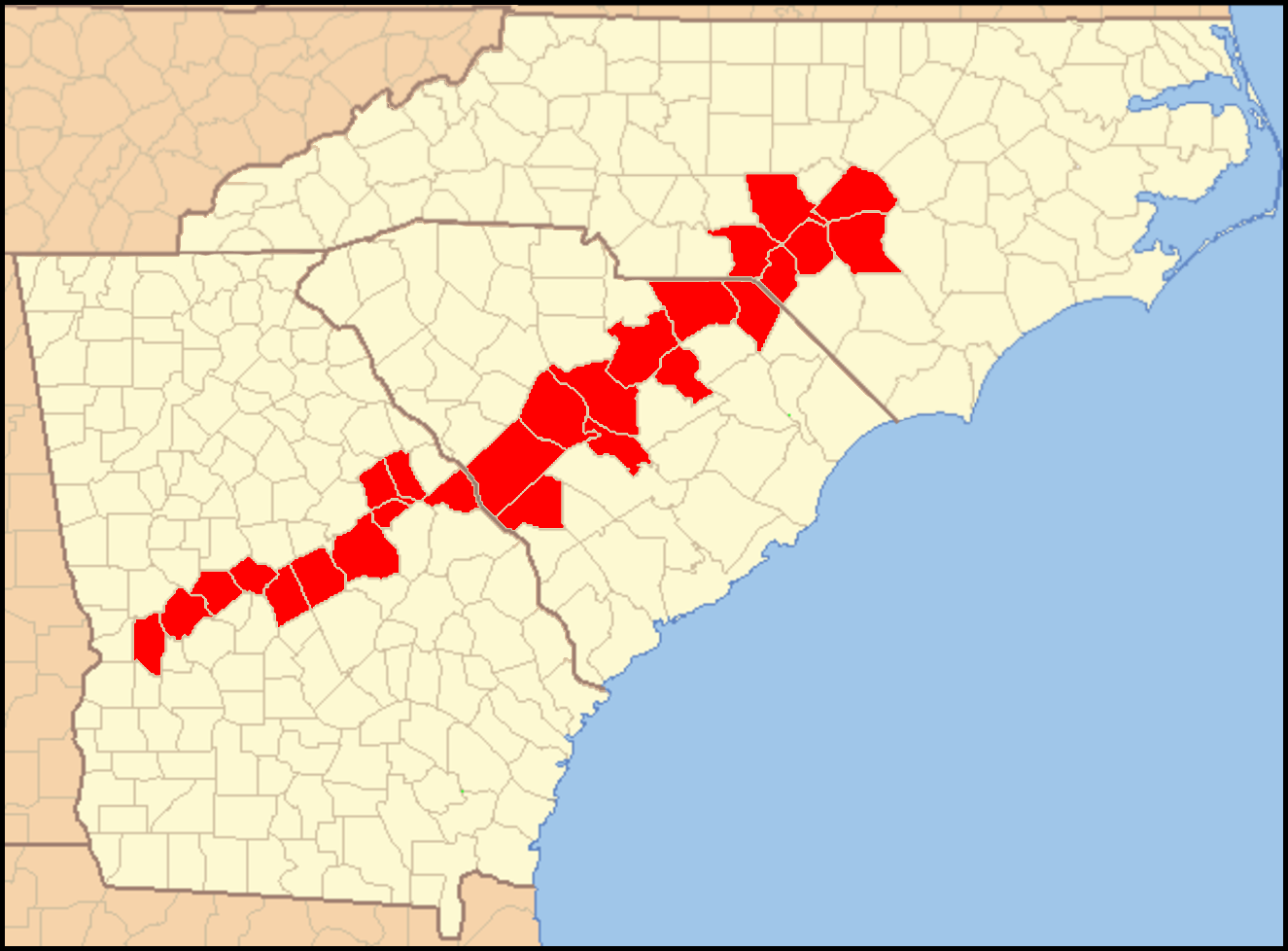
Before the Civil War, the Lowcountry referred to all territory east and south of the Sandhills, while all territory to the north and west were considered the "Piedmont"

Historically the region was dominated by the Lowcountry gentry, a planter aristocracy that dominated most economic activities in the region through extensive plantations. These gentry quickly imported most of the early slaves to South Carolina, and made a concerted effort to outlaw further imports, especially into the hinterland, in an effort to preserve their economic dominance.

Timothy Ford, a lawyer born in Trenton, New Jersey, moved to the Lowcountry in 1760 and criticized the gentry as having an "effeminate spirit of luxury and dissipation" and seemingly only cared about amusement, gambling, accumulation of wealth, and vanity.

At the outbreak of the American Revolutionary War, a subgroup of Lowcountry gentry emerged to prominence, the "Rice Pharaohs" who would create generational wealth with them and their descendants dominating South Carolinian politics in an effort to preserve slavery at all costs. The center of the rice industry was based around the confluence of the Waccamaw, the Great Peedee and Black Rivers due to the abundance of sediment deposits, a region that was compared to the Nile river in Egypt. Due to the harsh climate and labor intensive work required to harvest rice, planters at the time deemed it "impossible" to cultivate the region. The vast majority of slaves sent to South Carolina were imported for the rice plantations, and as such the rice pharaohs also become dominate players in the slave trade. Due to this Charleston rapidly grew to facilitate rice exports and slave imports.

The rice pharaohs quickly surpassed and replaced other gentry, such as those who grew sugar, due to the sugar industry's reliance on British trade with the Caribbean, making most of them loyalists during the war. By 1787 the Lowcountry gentry argued in favor of abolishing the import of any new slaves to the United States, as their own plantations were self sufficient, and their slaves reproducing. However, with Eli Whitney's invention of the cotton gin, South Carolina permitted the import of slaves from 1803 to 1808, almost exclusively to new inland cotton plantations, which saw the rise of the "Piedmont gentry" who began to erode the economic dominance of the rice pharaohs and Lowcounty gentry as a whole and advocated for further expansions to slavery. In order to compete with inland plantations, the Lowcountry gentry began buying land from Alabama to Texas and advocating for the reopening of the slave trade.

By the election of Abraham Lincoln in 1860 the Lowcountry gentry sided with the Piedmont gentry in the cause for secession. Following the Confederacy's defeat in the American Civil War, many of the Lowcountry estates had been destroyed by the Union army, with the slaves on the remaining plantations being emancipated, which finally broke the power of the Lowcountry gentry. Soon timber and phosphate mining became the primary economic power in the Lowcountry, as the remaining rice plantations struggled to compete with those in Texas. The deathblow to the rice plantations would be a series of hurricanes from 1893 to 1911 which destroyed most of the remaining estates, with their owners being unable to afford to rebuild. Their lands were mostly bought by Northerners to turn into hunting preserves, with only 70,000 acres of rice impoundments existing by 1999.

== Tourism ==
The tourism industry has been a vibrant part of the region's economy since the beginning of the 20th century. The tourism commission advertises both nature-based tourism and historic sites. The pressure of the tourism industry on the coast both encroaches on marshland and places pressure on African American communities.

The industry tends to emphasize the Gullah Geechee cultural tradition as part of the Gullah/Geechee Cultural Heritage Corridor. Important to this cultural tradition are traditional sweetgrass baskets. But, harvesting natural sweetgrass is under pressure from both development and overharvesting. Mary Jackson was awarded a MacArthur Fellowship for her work making sweetgrass baskets.

== See also ==
- History of South Carolina
- Bibliography of South Carolina history
