= Architecture of Charleston, South Carolina =

The architecture of Charleston, the largest city in the US state of South Carolina, has English and Barbadian influences.

== Architectural styles ==
=== Charleston Single House ===
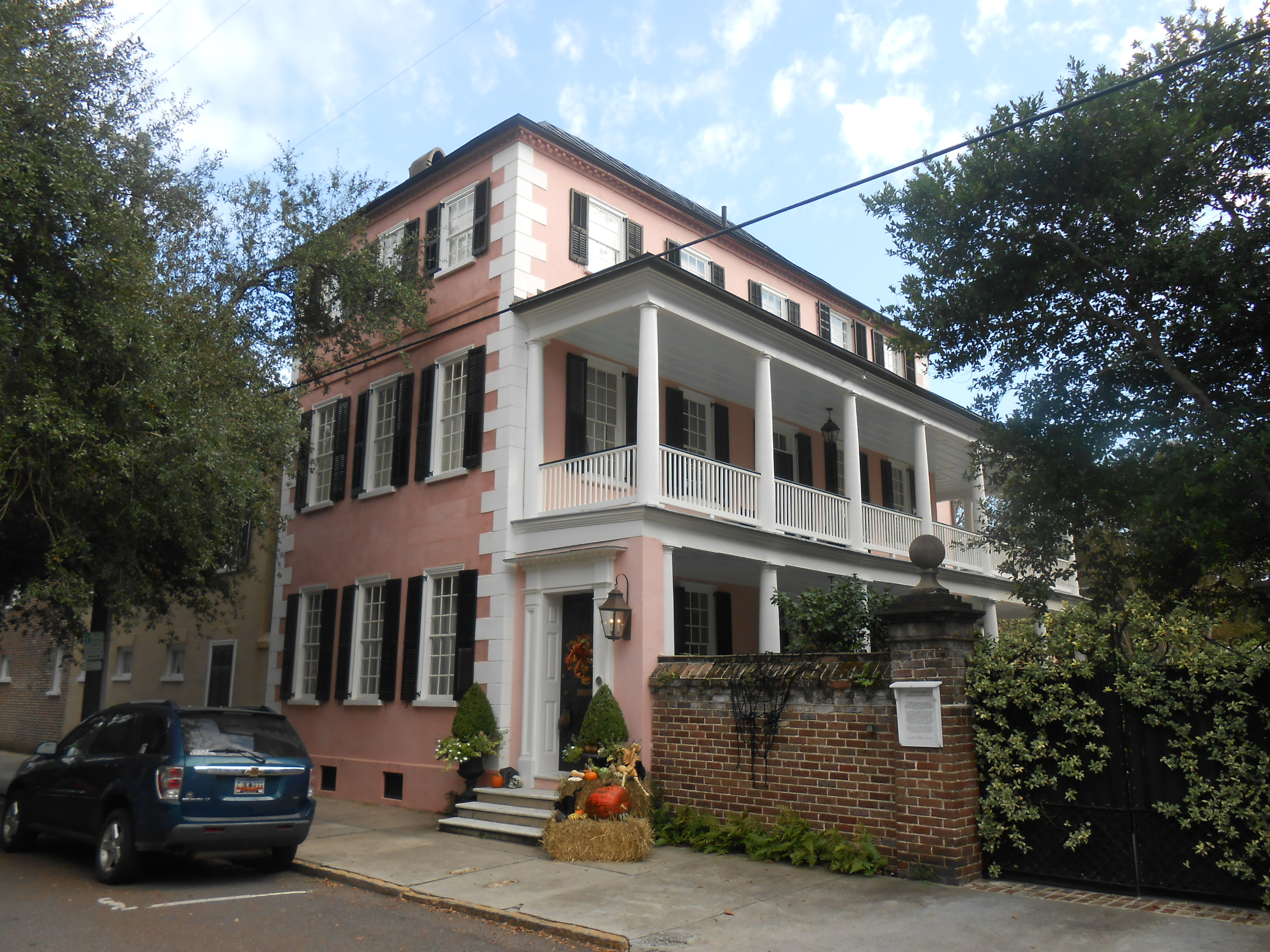
The Charles Graves House is a good example of the Charleston single house style

The Charleston single house is the city's most famous architectural style. The house is built with the longer side perpendicular to the street, and normally has a piazza on the south or west side to take advantage of the prevailing winds.

== Tallest buildings ==
The zoning requirements of Charleston discourage tall buildings, and folklore states that no building can be taller than the tallest church steeple, which is that of St. Matthew's Lutheran Church. Therefore, Charleston has no skyscrapers by the modern definition, although the first building described as such was the eight-story People's Office Building, completed in 1911.

11 Tallest Buildings
Rank	Name	Image	Height	Year	Floors	Notes
1	St. Matthew's Lutheran Church		255 ft (78 m)	1872		
2	Citadel Square Baptist Church		224 ft (68 m)	1856		
3	Dockside Condominiums		204 ft (62 m)	1978	18	
4	St. Philip's Church		200 ft (61 m)	1838 (Steeple completed 1850)		
5	St. Michael's Episcopal Church		186 ft (57 m)	1761		
6	Ashley River Tower		185 ft (56 m)	2008	9	
7	Morrison Yard Offices		180 ft (55 m)	2022	12	
8	Holiday Inn Charleston-Riverview		170 ft (52 m)	1971	14	
9	Cathedral of Saint John the Baptist		167 ft (51 m)	1907 (Spire added 2010)		
10	Francis Marion Hotel		165 ft (50 m)	1924	12	
11	The Canterbury House		158 ft (48 m)	1972	13	

== Bridges ==
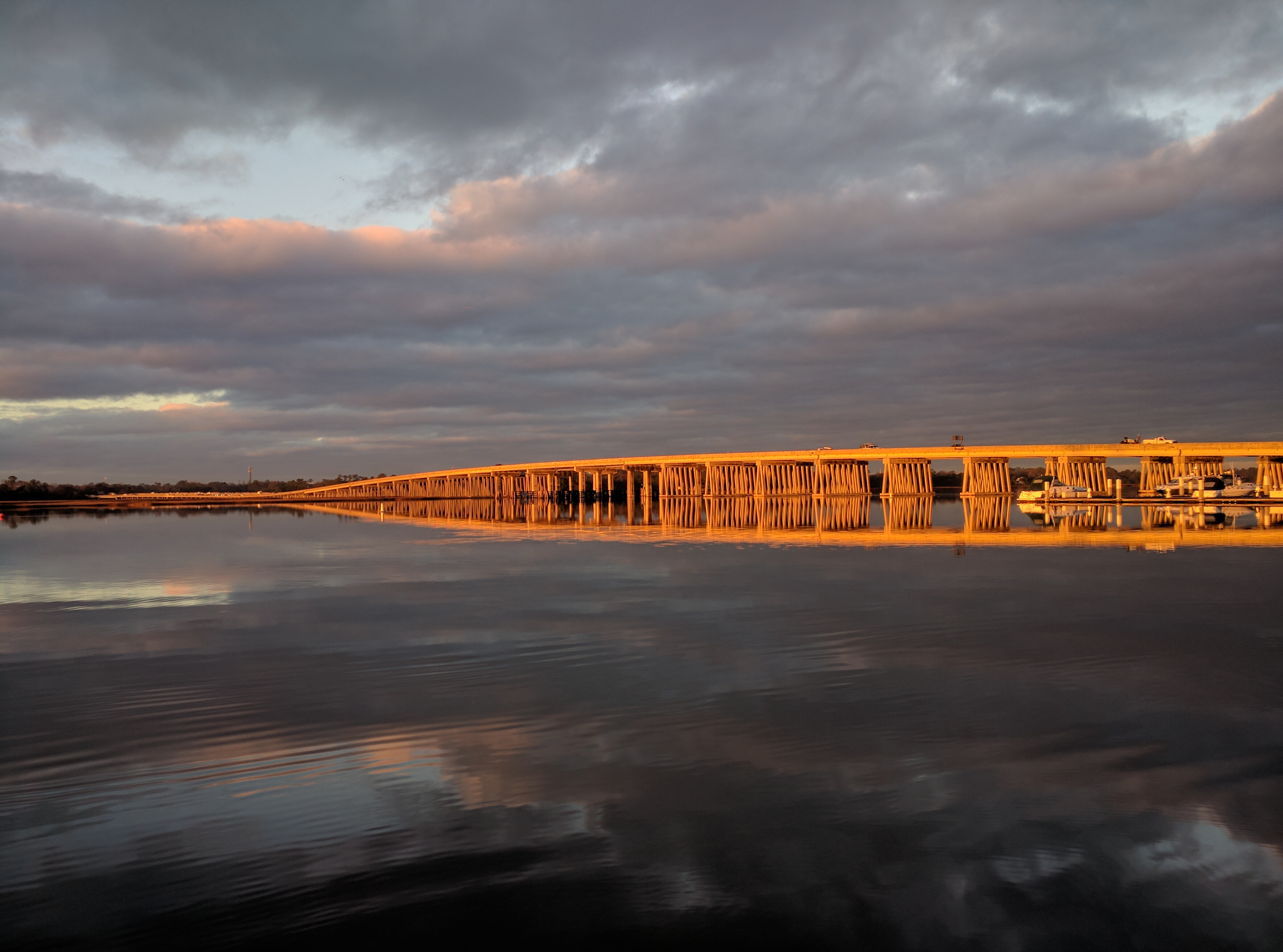
General William C. Westmoreland Bridge (1980)

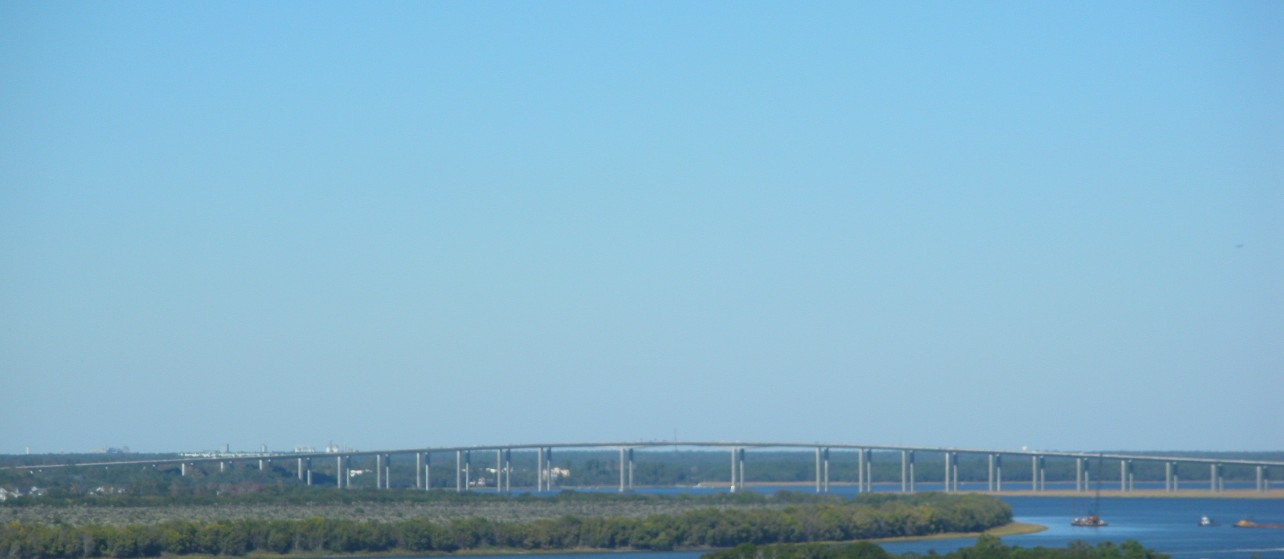
James B. Edwards Bridge (1989)

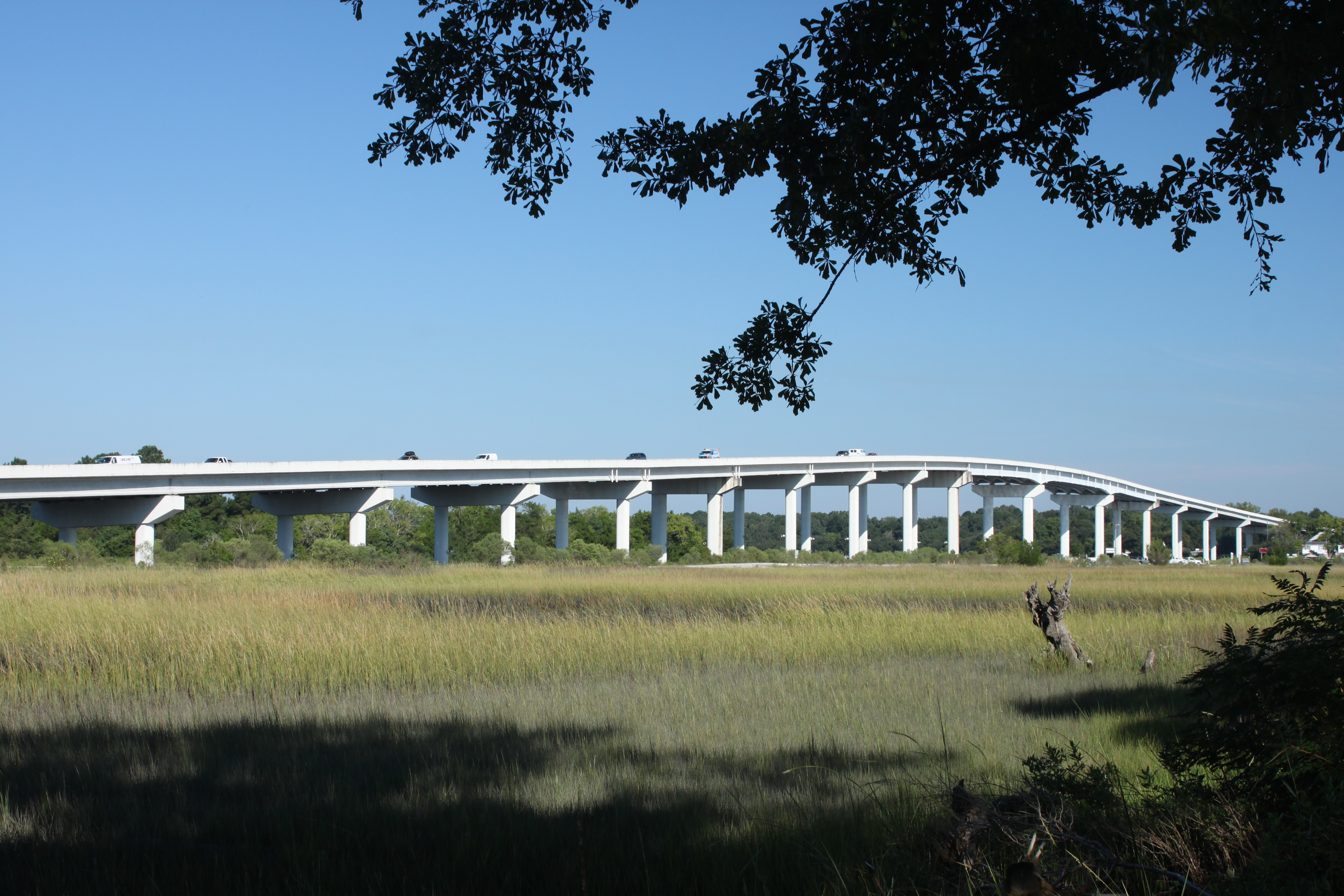
John F. Limehouse Memorial Bridge (2003)

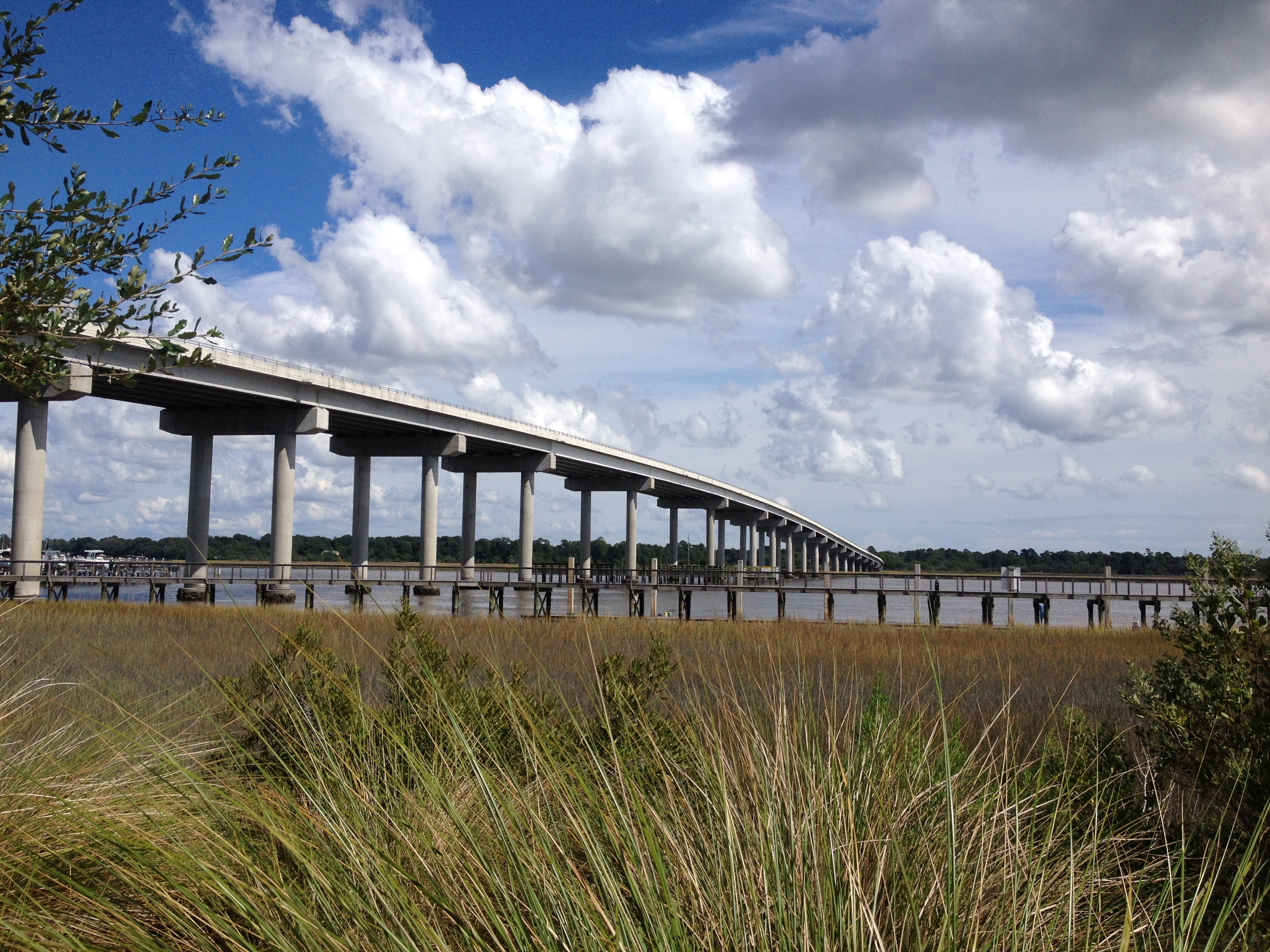
Paul Gelegotis Bridge (2003)

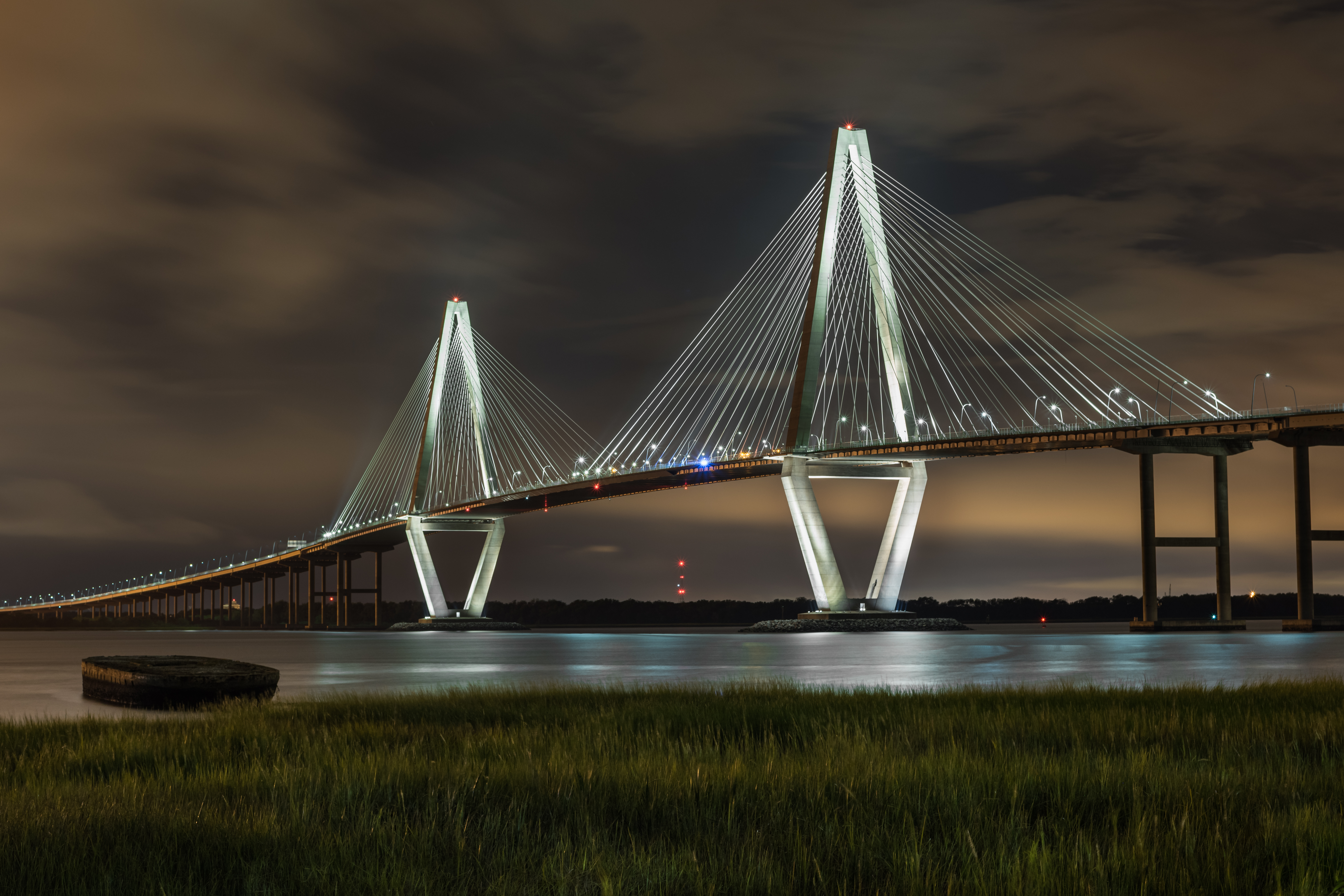
Arthur Ravenel Jr. Bridge (2005)

Charleston has many bridges over the Ashley, Cooper, Stono, and Wando rivers due to the city's peninsular geography. Particularly noteworthy is the Arthur Ravenel Jr. Bridge, which at the time of its construction was the longest cable-stayed bridge in the Western Hemisphere.

== Board of Architectural Review ==
The Board of Architectural Review is a part of the Charleston city government that was created in 1931 to oversee the preservation of buildings in the Charleston Historic District. The city architect oversees the Board. The current city architect is BD Wortham-Galvin.
