= Ben Sawyer Bridge =

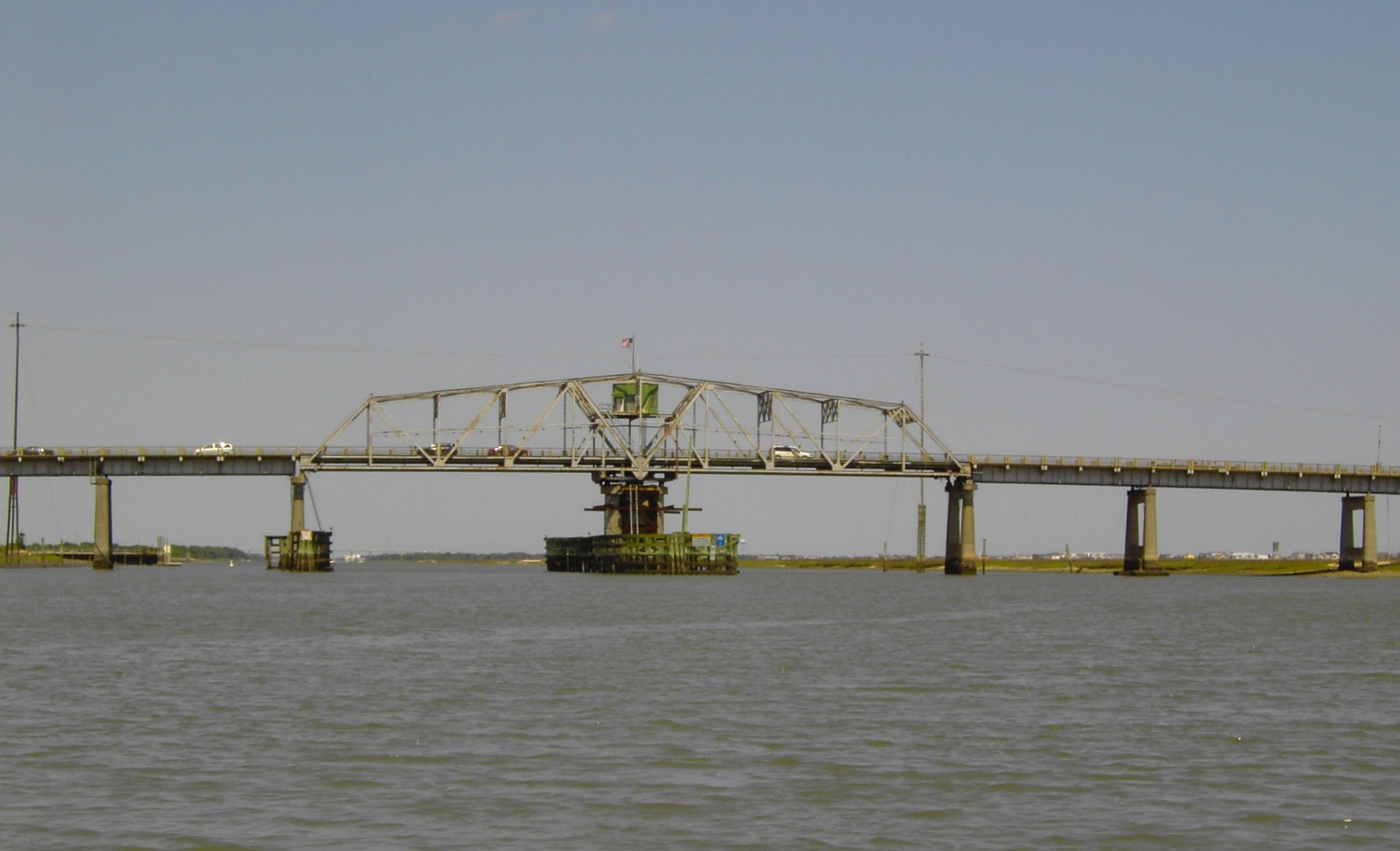
- The Ben Sawyer Bridge in 2008, with its original swing-span section
- Coordinates: 32°46′23″N 79°50′32″W
- Carries: SC 703 (Ben Sawyer Blvd.)
- Crosses: Intracoastal Waterway
- Locale: Mount Pleasant – Sullivans Island, South Carolina, United States
- Official name: Ben Sawyer Bridge
- Maintained by: South Carolina Department of Transportation

Characteristics
- Design: Movable swing
- Total length: 1153 feet (351.7 m)
- Width: 40 feet (12 m) (old span: 26 feet (7.9 m))
- Longest span: 246 feet (75 m)
- Load limit: 20 tons (18 metric tons)
- Clearance above: 32 feet (9.8m) (closed)

History
- Opened: June 18, 1945

Statistics
- Daily traffic: 12,400 (2005)

Location
- Interactive map of Ben Sawyer Bridge

The Ben Sawyer Bridge is a swing bridge that connects the town of Mount Pleasant with Sullivan's Island in South Carolina. The bridge swings on its central axis to open for boat traffic which is too tall to clear the bridge, and has an operator's house in the center of the swing span from which a tender can operate the bridge. The bridge was originally constructed in 1945, but the steel superstructure for the approach spans and swing span was replaced in 2010, albeit retaining the same general appearance.

The bridge originally cost about $775,000 (substructure, superstructure, and approaches) for the 247 foot span (total 1,154 length) with a 32-foot clearance (at high tide). The bridge is approached on both sides by a causeway; applications for the dredging were filed in July 1941. The contractor was to dig a 50 foot wide channel through the mud which would then be filled with dredged sand from the nearby waters. Although the preliminary work moved forward, progress on the superstructure of the bridge was held up for many months due to the lack of steel during World War II; the military supported the completion of the project, though, and the project moved forward again starting in 1943. The bridge opened to traffic on June 18, 1945. Prior to completion of the Isle of Palms Connector Bridge in 1993, the Ben Sawyer Bridge provided the only vehicular access to Sullivan's Island, and, by a connecting bridge, Isle of Palms.

The bridge was heavily damaged during Hurricane Hugo, leaving one end of the main span in the Intracoastal Waterway. Pictures of the damaged bridge are some of the most recognizable lasting images of the destruction wrought by the storm. It was subsequently repaired and reopened to traffic in October 1989.

== Rehabilitation project ==
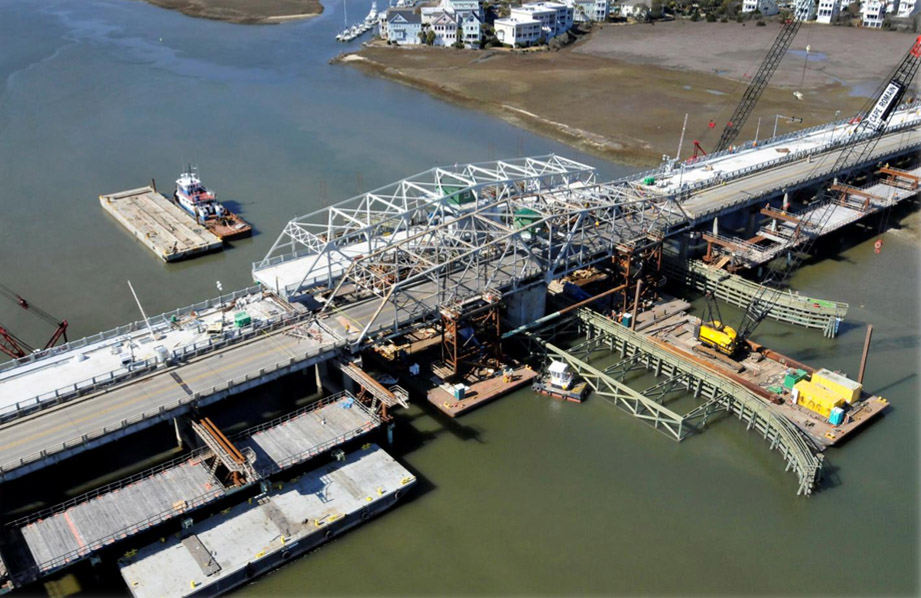
Aerial view with old and new bridges side-by-side during the 2010 replacement project

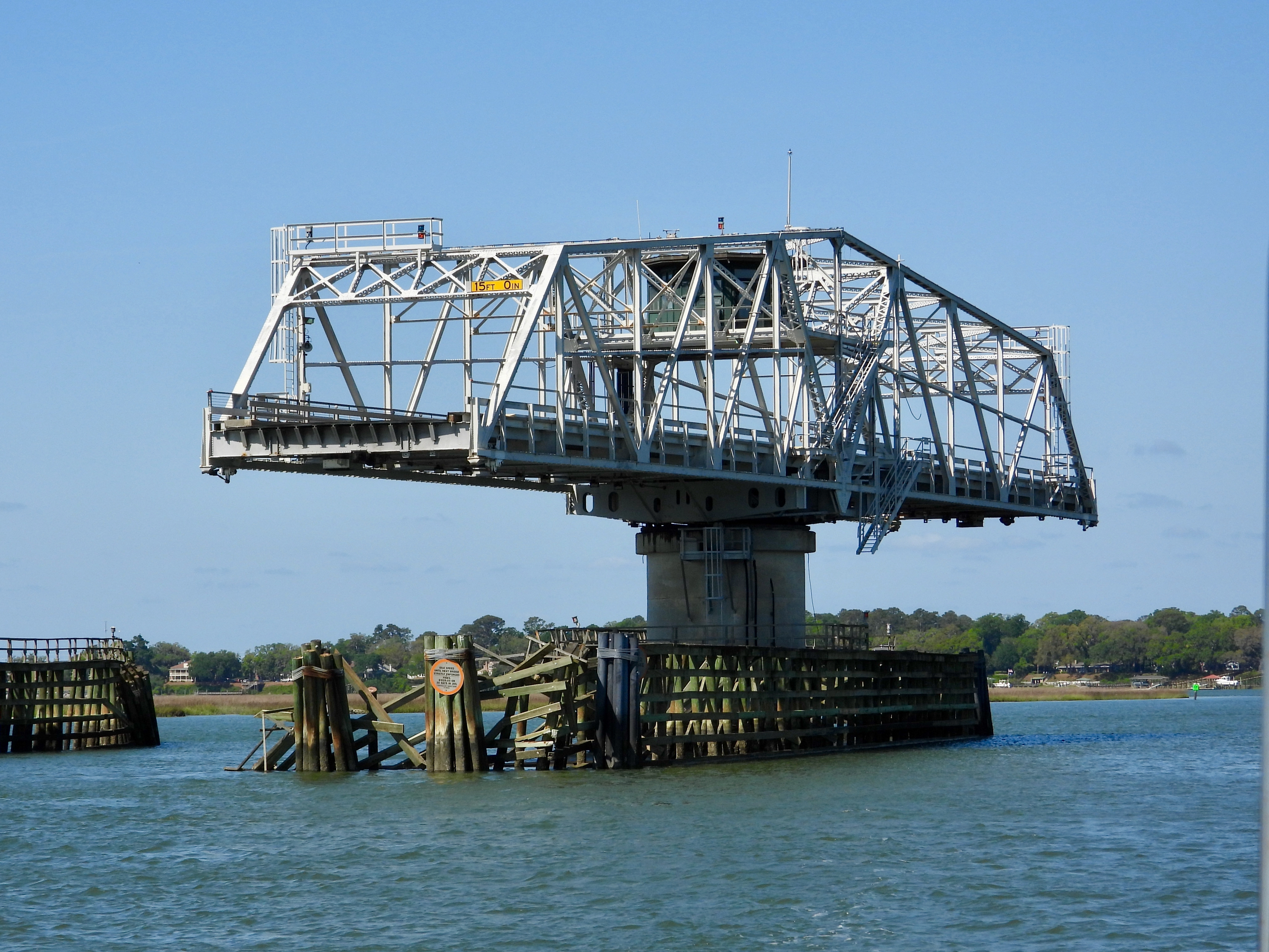
The current swing span in 2025, opened for marine traffic

A $32.5 million rehabilitation of the Ben Sawyer Bridge was approved by the South Carolina Department of Transportation (SCDOT) in August 2008. The rehabilitation was tendered as a Design/build Contract by the SCDOT. The Engineer of Record was Hardesty & Hanover, LLC and the General Contractor was PCL. The project began in January 2009 and was completed in February 2010. The project included replacement of the aging steel superstructure including the swing-span section with a new swing-span truss and operating machinery retaining the historic look of its predecessor. In addition, each traffic lane was widened from 12 feet to 14 feet, and the 2.5-foot (76 cm) sidewalks on both sides were replaced by a single 5-foot (1.5 m) one on the harbor side only. The bridge closed temporarily on February 7, 2010, for removal of the old span and installation of the replacement span, which was lifted into place from barges using hydraulic jacks on February 11. The bridge reopened to traffic on February 19, 2010.

== Origin of the name ==
The Ben Sawyer Bridge is named in honor of Benjamin Mack Sawyer (1890–1940), Chief Highway Commissioner of the South Carolina Highway Department, 1926–1940. His name was suggested as a name for the bridge in April 1945.
