= South Carolina Highway 517 =

State highway in South Carolina, United States

South Carolina Highway 517
- Isle of Palms Connector; Clyde Moultrie Dangerfield Highway

Route information
- Maintained by SCDOT
- Length: 3.840 mi (6.180 km)
- Existed: 1993–present

Major junctions
- South end: SC 703 in Isle of Palms
- North end: US 17 in Mount Pleasant

Location
- Country: United States
- State: South Carolina
- Counties: Charleston

Highway system
- South Carolina State Highway System; Interstate; US; State; Scenic
← SC 513	→ I-520

South Carolina Highway 517 (SC 517, also known as Isle of Palms (IOP) Connector or Clyde Moultrie Dangerfield Highway) is a 3.840-mile (6.180 km) state highway in the eastern part of the Charleston, South Carolina metropolitan area. It exists completely within Charleston County, in the southeastern part of the U.S. state of South Carolina. The highway travels in a southeast–northwest orientation from Isle of Palms to Mount Pleasant. Most of the highway consists of the Isle of Palms Connector Bridge.

== Route description ==
SC 517 begins at an intersection with SC 703 (Palm Boulevard) in Isle of Palms. It passes over the Intracoastal Waterway. The only significant intersection on the route, aside from each terminus, is with Rifle Range Road. The road continues northwest until it meets its northern terminus at U.S. Route 17 (US 17) in Mount Pleasant.

The entire length of SC 517 is part of the National Highway System, a system of roadways important to the nation's economy, defense, and mobility.

== History ==
Established in 1993 as new construction, it included a median lane, which is used during evacuation emergencies. Historically, SC 517 existed once before from 1942-1948; connecting between SC 3, north of Blackville, to SC 5, north of Denmark. Today it is Gardenia Road (S-6-38) and Springfield Road (S-5-29).

== Major intersections ==
The entire route is in Charleston County.

Location	mi	km	Destinations	Notes
Isle of Palms	0.000	0.000	SC 703 (Palm Boulevard) / 14th Avenue – Sullivan's Island	Southern terminus
Intracoastal Waterway	1.163	1.872	Isle of Palms Connector Bridge	
Mount Pleasant	3.840	6.180	US 17 – Charleston, Georgetown	Northern terminus
1.000 mi = 1.609 km; 1.000 km = 0.621 mi
