= Isle of Palms Connector Bridge =

- Coordinates: 32°48′01″N 79°47′44″W
- Carries: SC 517
- Crosses: Intracoastal Waterway
- Locale: Isle of Palms, South Carolina
- Official name: Clyde Moultrie Dangerfield Highway
- Maintained by: South Carolina Department of Transportation

Characteristics
- Design: Stringer/Multi-beam or Girder
- Total length: 11700 feet (3567 m)
- Width: 54 feet (16.5m) 2 lanes
- Clearance above: 65 feet (19.8m)

History
- Construction start: 1990
- Construction end: 1993

Statistics
- Daily traffic: 16900 (2005)

Location
- Interactive map of Isle of Palms Connector Bridge

The Isle of Palms Connector Bridge connects the town of Mount Pleasant with the Isle of Palms in South Carolina. The bridge is part of, and comprises most of the length of, South Carolina Highway 517, which is commonly known as the "Isle of Palms Connector", and bears the official name of "Clyde Moultrie Dangerfield Highway". It connects US 17 in Mount Pleasant, SC with South Carolina Highway 703 on the Isle of Palms. It was designed by a joint venture between LPA and Grenier and built by Massman Construction Company.

The connector is the site of the annual "Isle of Palms Connector Run and Walk for the Child," a combined 10k run and 5k run/walk.

The highway was named for Clyde Moultrie Dangerfield, a Charleston area business man who served in the South Carolina House of Representatives.
