= Capt. John Morrison House =

Historic house in South Carolina, US

Coordinates: 32.7740°N 79.9348°W

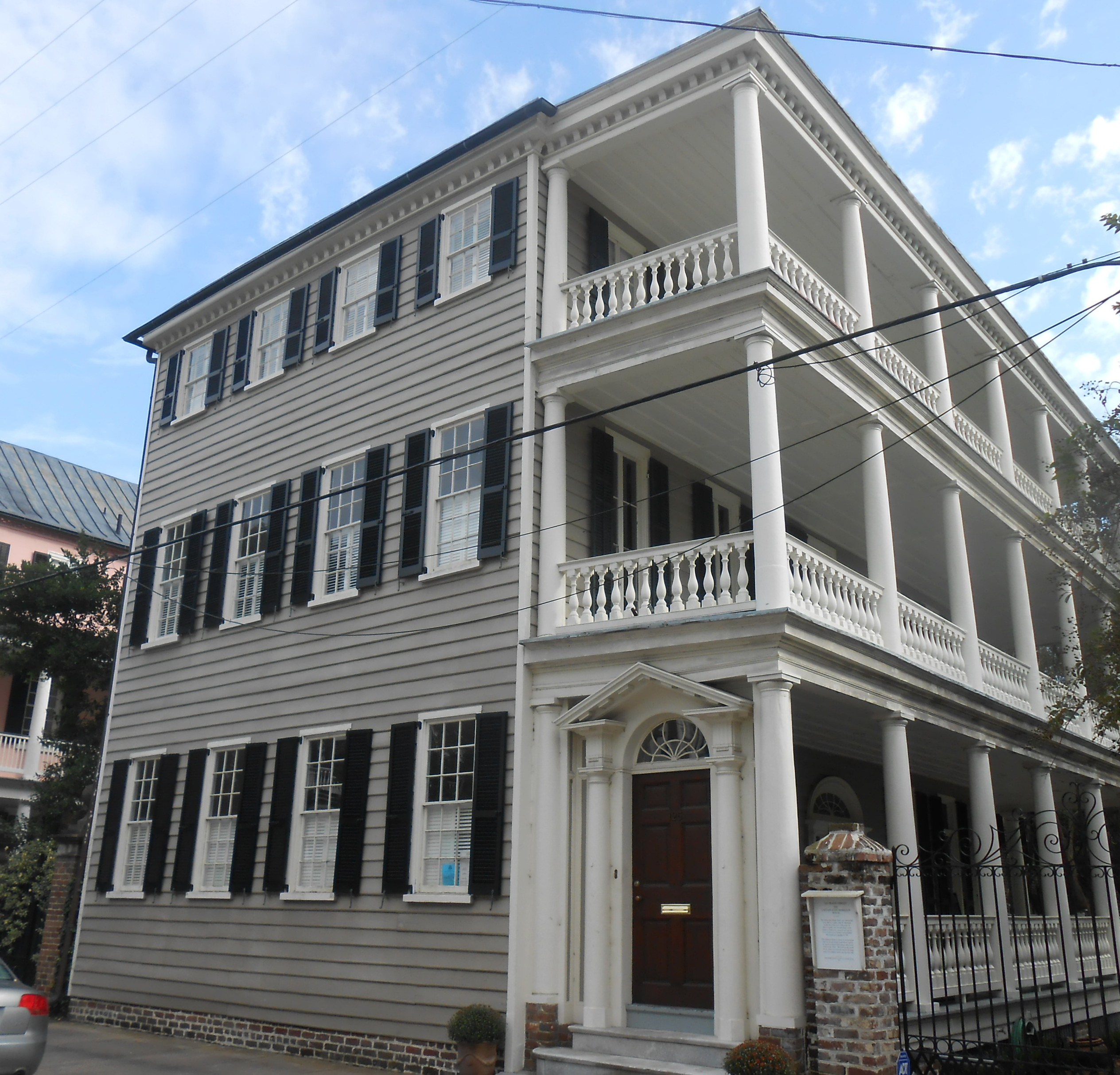
125 Tradd St. was built at least by 1805.

The Capt. John Morrison House is a historic home at 125 Tradd St., Charleston, South Carolina, United States. Capt. John Morrison bought the property on May 1, 1800, but he did not first appear in a city directory until 1806. The sales price paid by Capt. Morrison does not definitely reflect the purchase of a pre-existing house; as a result, the house of often claimed to have been built in 1805. In the 1840s, piazzas were added to the house. The house is a traditional Charleston single house, a form typified by a central entry and stair hall with the central door on the "side" of the house and one room on each side. Because of the unusual width of the house, 125 Tradd St. is four-bays wide with an unusually deep entrance hall and rectangular rooms on each side.

The house sold for $3,960,000 to a tech entrepreneur in November 2017.

It is now for sale.
