= Daniel Ravenel House =

Historic house in Charleston, South Carolina, US

Coordinates: 32.77673°N 79.93018°W

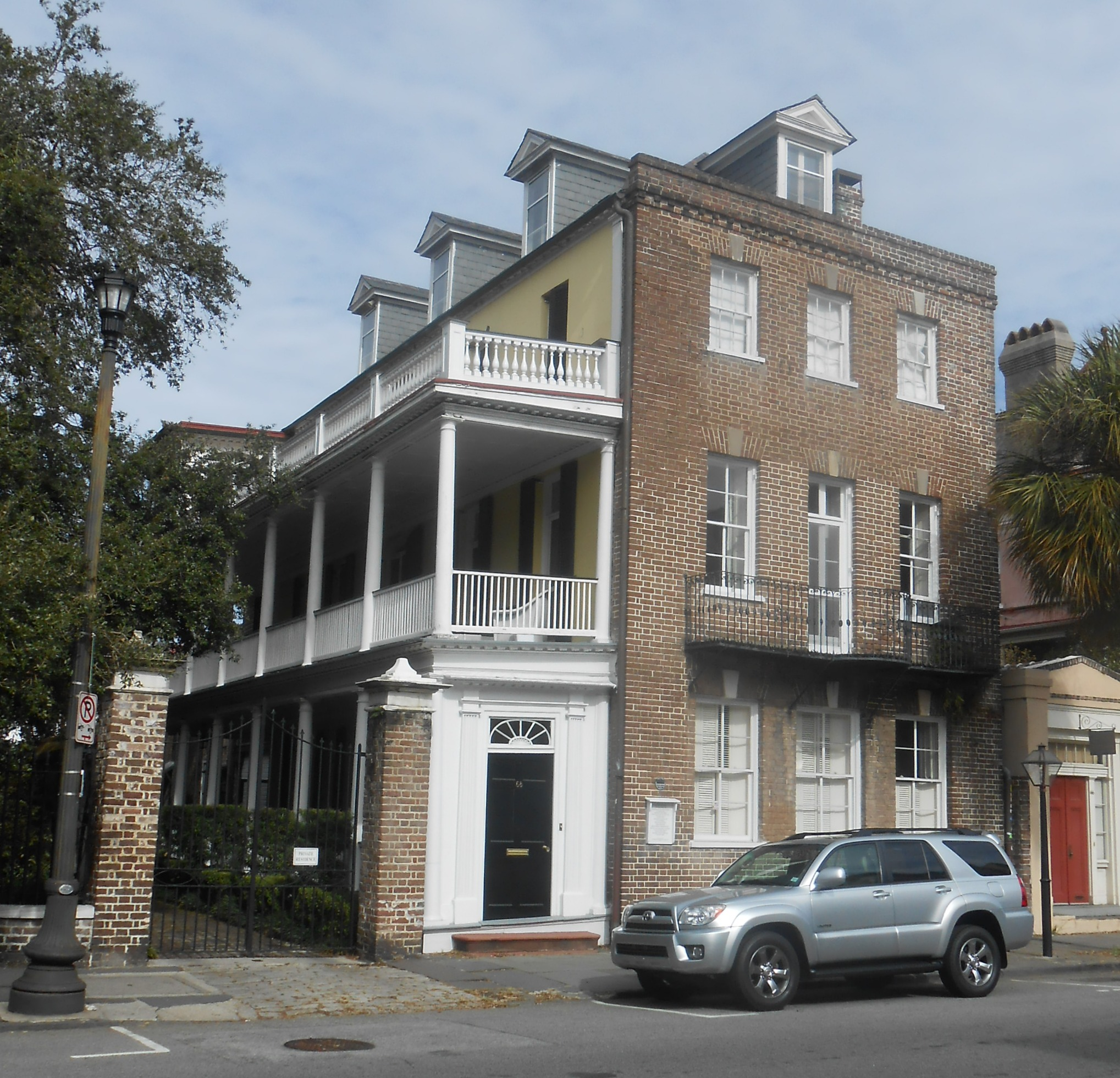
The Daniel Ravenel House stands at 68 Broad Street, Charleston, South Carolina.

The Daniel Ravenel House has remained in the same family longer than any other house in Charleston, South Carolina. The property itself was first owned by the current owner's family when Isaac Mazyck acquired the land, probably in about 1710; he definitely owned the parcel by 1719. When he died in 1735, his daughter inherited the house, and it became her home along with her husband, Daniel Ravenel. When the original house burned in 1796, the current Charleston single house was constructed. The Ravenel family has occupied the house since 1796. More than ten generations of the Ravenels have occupied the house, all of them but one named Daniel Ravenel.
