= James B. Edwards =

American politician (1927–2014)

James Edwards
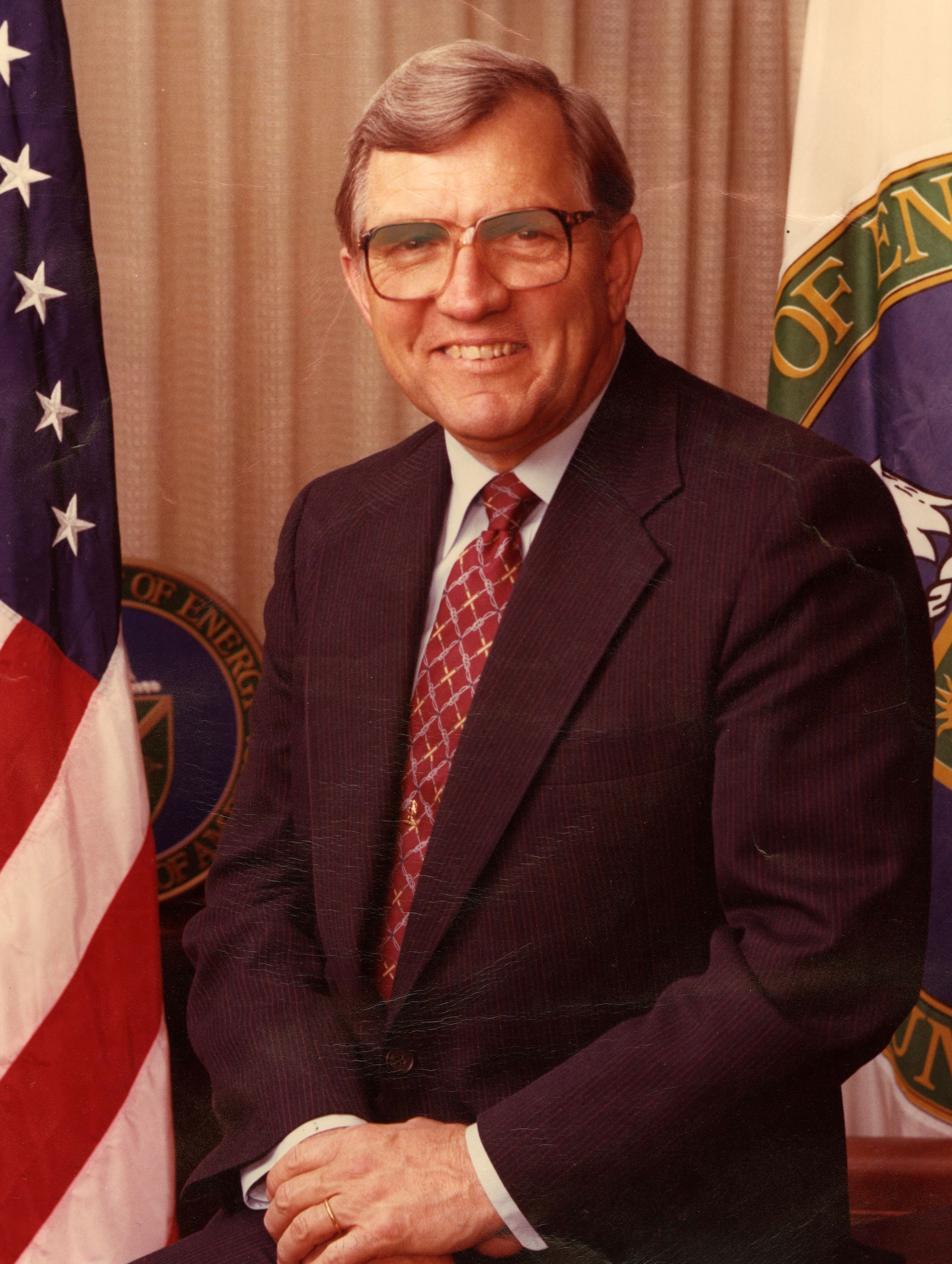
- Official portrait, 1981

3rd United States Secretary of Energy
- In office January 23, 1981 – November 5, 1982
- President: Ronald Reagan
- Preceded by: Charles Duncan
- Succeeded by: Donald Hodel

110th Governor of South Carolina
- In office January 21, 1975 – January 10, 1979
- Lieutenant: Brantley Harvey
- Preceded by: John West
- Succeeded by: Richard Riley

Member of the South Carolina Senate from Charleston County
- In office 1973–1975

Personal details
- Born: James Burrows Edwards; June 24, 1927 Hawthorne, Florida, U.S.
- Died: December 26, 2014 (aged 87) Mount Pleasant, South Carolina, U.S.
- Party: Republican
- Spouse: Ann Darlington (1951–2014)
- Education: College of Charleston (BS); University of Louisville (DMD)

Military service
- Allegiance: United States
- Branch/service: United States Navy
- Unit: United States Maritime Service
- Battles/wars: World War II

James Burrows Edwards (June 24, 1927 – December 26, 2014) was an American politician and administrator from South Carolina. He was the first Republican to be elected governor of South Carolina since the post-Civil War Reconstruction era in the 1870s. He later served as the U.S. secretary of energy under Ronald Reagan.

== Early life and career ==
Edwards was born in Hawthorne, Florida, and was an officer in the U.S. Maritime Service during World War II. He continued his service in the U.S. Naval Reserve after the war. Edwards received a bachelor's degree in 1950 at the College of Charleston, where he was a brother of Pi Kappa Phi fraternity. He received a D.M.D. in 1955 from the University of Louisville, and did a dental internship at the University of Pennsylvania. Returning to Charleston, Edwards established a dentistry practice in 1960 that specialized in oral surgery. He subsequently held a variety of positions associated with dentistry in the community.

== Political career ==
In 1970, Edwards became chairman of the Republican Party of South Carolina's 1st congressional district. As a supporter of Republican gubernatorial nominee U.S. Representative Albert Watson of South Carolina's 2nd congressional district, Edwards claimed that Watson's Democratic opponent, John C. West, worked covertly in 1969 against the nomination of South Carolina's Clement Haynsworth to the United States Supreme Court. The Nixon nominee failed in the U.S. Senate, 55 to 45, on grounds of alleged bias against organized labor and a lack of support for civil rights. Edwards predicted that as governor, West would install "an ultra-liberal, minority-dominated state government," citing West's political ties to Hubert H. Humphrey and longtime NAACP executive director Roy Wilkins.

Edwards first ran for office in 1971, in a special election to fill the vacancy in the Charleston-centered 1st congressional district caused by the death of longtime Democrat L. Mendel Rivers. Edwards narrowly lost to one of Rivers's staffers, Mendel Jackson Davis, but gained enough name recognition from his strong showing that he was elected to the South Carolina Senate as a Republican from white-majority Charleston County. Two years later, he entered the governor's race as a long-shot candidate. Edwards upset General William Westmoreland in the Republican primary and defeated Democratic Congressman William Jennings Bryan Dorn of South Carolina's 3rd congressional district in the general election. Dorn had become the Democratic nominee after the winner of the runoff election, Charles D. "Pug" Ravenel, was disqualified on residency grounds.

Edwards was elected the first Republican governor of the state since Daniel Henry Chamberlain in 1876. 1974 was otherwise a dismal year for Republicans nationally because of the Watergate scandal and lingering opposition to the Vietnam War, both of which may have contributed to the primary defeat of Westmoreland, commander of U.S. forces during the late 1960s.

== Later career and death ==
At that time, South Carolina governors were not allowed to serve two terms in succession, so Edwards was unable to seek reelection in 1978. In 1981, U.S. President Ronald Reagan appointed Edwards secretary of energy. He resigned two years later to serve as the President of the Medical University of South Carolina, a post he held for 17 years. In 1997, Edwards was inducted into the South Carolina Hall of Fame. In 2008, he endorsed Mitt Romney for his party's presidential nomination.

As governor and thereafter, Edwards developed a close friendship with his Democratic predecessor, John C. West, whom he had earlier accused of undermining the Haynsworth nomination.

In 1994, the state legislature renamed a portion of the Mark Clark Expressway that crosses the Wando River the James B. Edwards Bridge. In 2010, the new MUSC dental building and the dental school was renamed the James B. Edwards College of Dental Medicine. Edwards died at his home in Mount Pleasant on December 26, 2014, from complications from a stroke. He was 87.

Party political offices
Preceded by Albert Watson	Republican nominee for Governor of South Carolina; 1974	Succeeded by Edward Young
Political offices
Preceded by John West	Governor of South Carolina; 1975–1979	Succeeded by Richard Riley
Preceded by Charles Duncan	United States Secretary of Energy; 1981–1982	Succeeded by Donald Hodel
