= South Carolina Highway 703 =

State highway in South Carolina, United States

South Carolina Highway 703

Route information
- Maintained by SCDOT
- Length: 10.930 mi (17.590 km)

Major junctions
- West end: US 17 in Mount Pleasant
- I-526 BS in Mount Pleasant; SC 517 in Isle of Palms
- East end: Palm Avenue and 41st Avenue in Isle of Palms

Location
- Country: United States
- State: South Carolina
- Counties: Charleston

Highway system
- South Carolina State Highway System; Interstate; US; State; Scenic
← SC 702	→ SC 707

South Carolina Highway 703 (SC 703) is a 10.930-mile (17.590 km) state highway in the U.S. state of South Carolina. The highway connects Mount Pleasant and Isle of Palms, via Sullivan's Island.

== Route description ==
SC 703 begins at a partial interchange with U.S. Route 17 (US 17; Johnnie Dodds Boulevard) in Mount Pleasant, within Charleston County. This interchange is on the eastern end of the Arthur Ravenel Jr. Bridge and just south of the Mount Pleasant Memorial Waterfront Park. There is no access from US 17 south to SC 703 or from SC 703 north to US 17 north. It travels to the southeast and has an intersection with Patriots Point Road and Magrath Darby Boulevard. The former leads to the Patriots Point Naval and Maritime Museum; while the latter is used to complete the above interchange. The highway crosses over Shem Creek and curves to the east-northeast. It passes Christ Our King-Stella Maris School at the eastern terminus of Interstate 526 Business (I-526 Bus.; Chuck Dawley Boulevard). SC 703 then curves to the south-southeast. It crosses over the Intracoastal Waterway on the Ben Sawyer Bridge and enters Sullivan's Island. The highway intersects Jasper Boulevard, onto which SC 703 turns left, at the Dr. George G. Durst Sr. Intersection. It begins traveling to the northeast and crosses over Breach Inlet on the H.L. Hunley Bridge and enters Isle of Palms. The highway continues to the northeast and intersects the southern terminus of SC 517 (Isle of Palms Connector), at the Rep. Mike Sottile Intersection, just north-northwest of Isle of Palms County Park. Just before 21st Avenue, the highway curves to travel closer to the coast. One block past 40th Avenue, it curves to the north-northwest for about one block. Here, Palm Boulevard turns to the right and travels to the east-northeast, while 41st Avenue continues to the north-northwest.

== Major intersections ==
The entire route is in Charleston County.

Location	mi	km	Destinations	Notes
Mount Pleasant	0.000	0.000	US 17 (Johnnie Dodds Boulevard) – Charleston, Savannah, Georgetown, Myrtle Beach	US 17 north to SC 703 north and SC 703 south to US 17 south only; interchange; former US 701
Mount Pleasant	2.740	4.410	I-526 BS west (Chuck Dawley Boulevard) to I-526 west / US 17 north – Georgetown, North Charleston	Eastern terminus of I-526 Bus.
Mount Pleasant–Sullivan's Island line	4.809	7.739	Ben M. Sawyer Memorial Bridge over the Intracoastal Waterway	
Sullivan's Island–Isle of Palms line	7.304	11.755	H.L. Hunley Bridge over Breach Inlet	
Isle of Palms	8.960	14.420	SC 517 north (Isle of Palms Connector)	Southern terminus of SC 517; Rep. Mike Sottile Intersection
Isle of Palms	10.93	17.59	Palm Boulevard north / 41st Avenue – Isle of Palms Marina, Wild Dunes	Eastern terminus; Palm Boulevard continues past intersection.
1.000 mi = 1.609 km; 1.000 km = 0.621 mi: Incomplete access
