= South Carolina Highway 31 (disambiguation) =

South Carolina Highway 31 may refer to:

- South Carolina Highway 31, a current state highway from near Socastee to Little River
- South Carolina Highway 31 (1920s), a former state highway from northwest of St. Matthews to Goose Creek
- South Carolina Highway 31 (1980s), a former state highway from Charleston to North Charleston
