= John McKee House =

Coordinates: 32.773219°N 79.932221°W

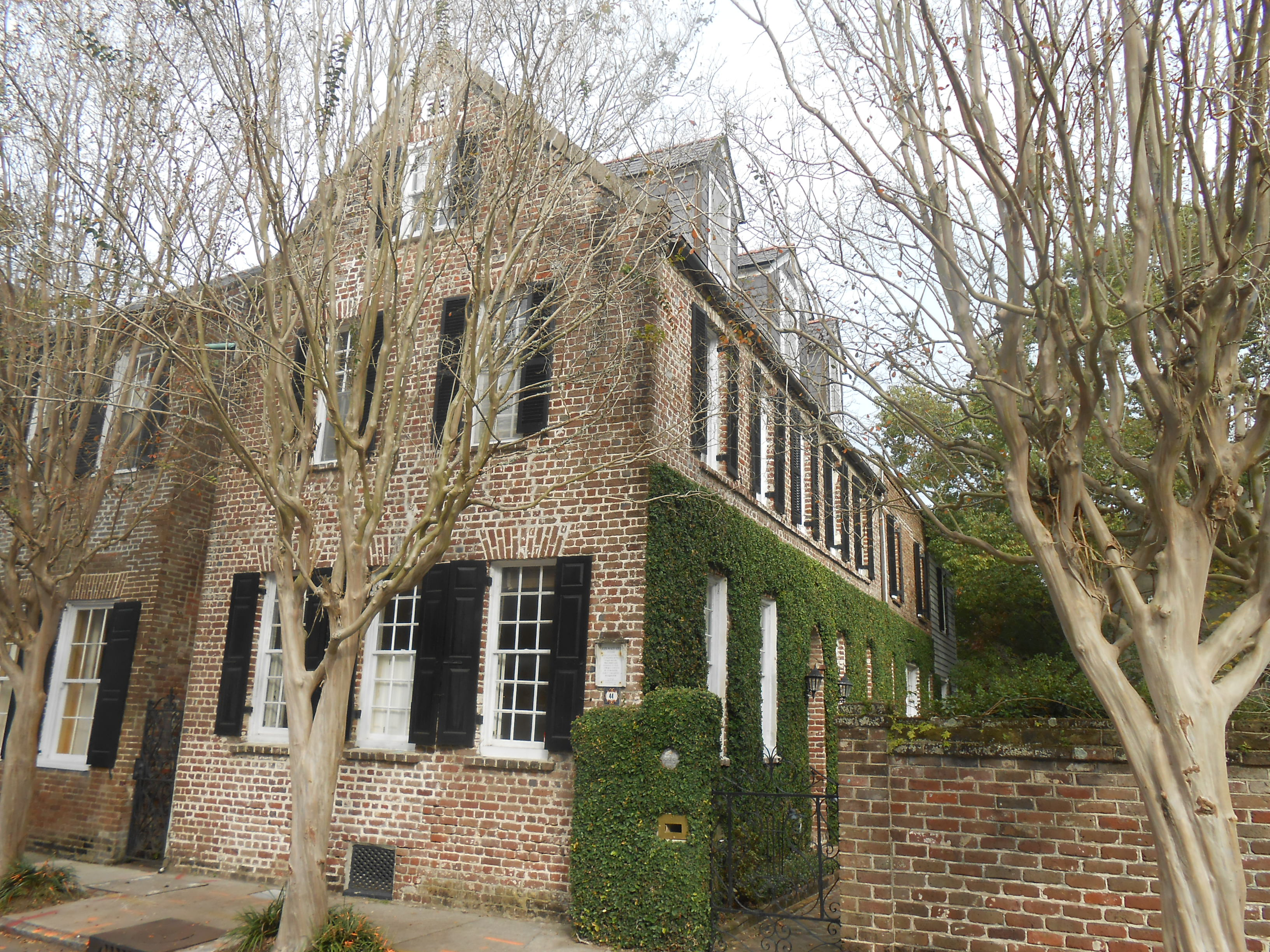
The John McKee House, 44 King St., Charleston, South Carolina

The John McKee House is a c. 1796 house at 44 King St., Charleston, South Carolina. The house follows a traditional Charleston single house layout with a small stair hall separating two main rooms per floor, one toward the street and one toward the rear of the property. The brickwork suggests that a door originally entered the house from King St., but it was replaced with a window at some point. Its first known owner was John McKee who died without heirs, leaving the house to the Methodist Episcopal Church. When the church divided in 1845, the house became the joint property of three black churches: Centenary, Wesley, and Old Bethel. The Methodist Episcopal Church rented the property out until 1915. In 1929, Mrs. Victor Morawetz of Fenwick Hall, Johns Island, bought the house.

It remains privately owned as of November 2025.
