= Don N. Holt Bridge =

Don Holt Bridge
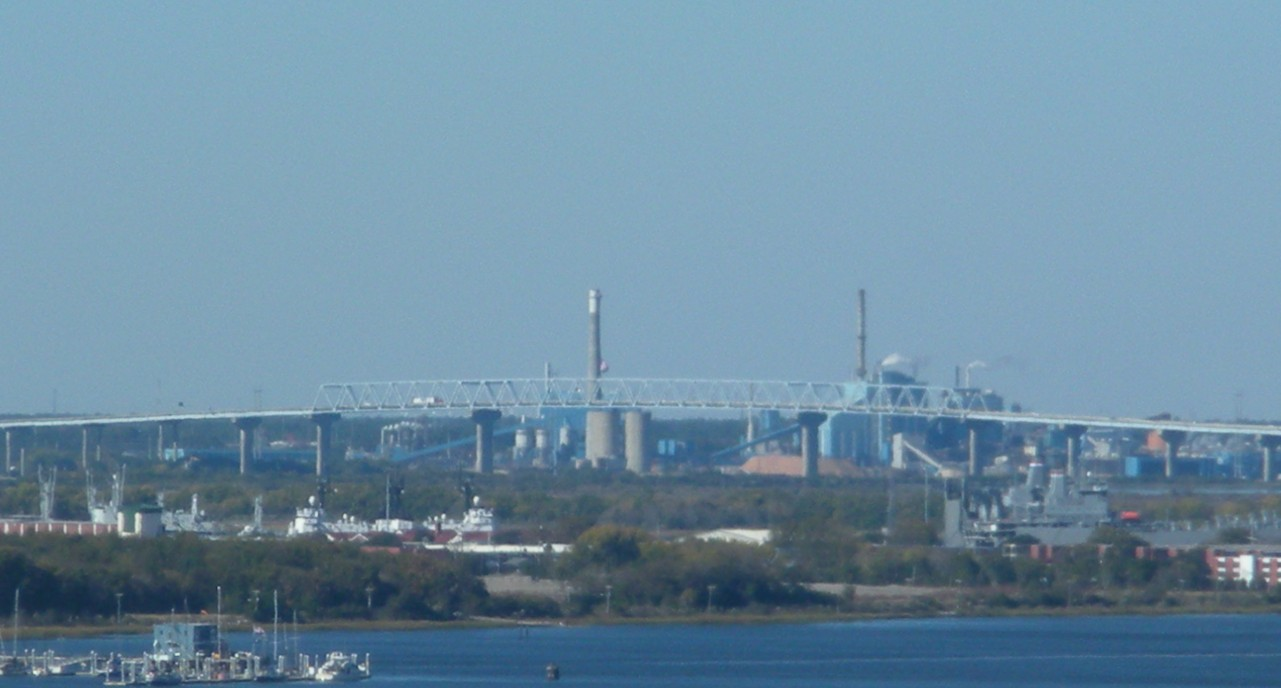
- Coordinates: 32°53′28″N 79°57′47″W
- Carries: I-526
- Crosses: Cooper River
- Locale: North Charleston, Charleston
- Official name: Don N. Holt Bridge
- Maintained by: South Carolina Department of Transportation

Characteristics
- Design: Continuous truss bridge
- Width: 93 feet 7 inches (28.52 m), 6 lanes of traffic
- Longest span: 800 feet (240 m)
- Clearance below: 155 feet (47 m)

History
- Construction end: 1992
- Opened: March 10, 1992; 34 years ago

Statistics
- Daily traffic: 72,200

Location
- Interactive map of Don Holt Bridge

The Don N. Holt Bridge is a parallel chord, three-span continuous, modified Warren-type truss bridge that carries Interstate 526 (I-526) over the Cooper River between Charleston and North Charleston. It was built in 1992 by the South Carolina Department of Transportation and was designed by HNTB Corporation.

The bridge provides a connection between the communities east of the Cooper River, including Mount Pleasant and Daniel Island, to North Charleston and I-26. It is part of a major hurricane evacuation route for the area.

The Don Holt Bridge is adjacent to a Kapstone (formerly MeadWestvaco) paper mill. In the mid-1980s, prior to construction of the bridge, owners of the mill filed a lawsuit to stop the bridge because the bridge deck would be at the same height as smokestacks from the mill. In certain weather conditions, the smokestacks produce a fog which could blind drivers and place the mill at risk for lawsuits from drivers. The lawsuit was settled by mandating that a road weather information system (RWIS) be included in the bridge project. The RWIS was designed to detect reduced visibility on the bridge and "to inform drivers of dense fog conditions, reduce traffic speeds, and guide vehicles safely through the fog-prone area." The system uses variable-message signs and illuminating pavement lights (similar to a runway centerline lighting system). As of May 2003, there were no fog-related crashes.

The bridge was named for Don N. Holt who served in the South Carolina House of Representatives and was in the insurance business.
