= General William C. Westmoreland Bridge =

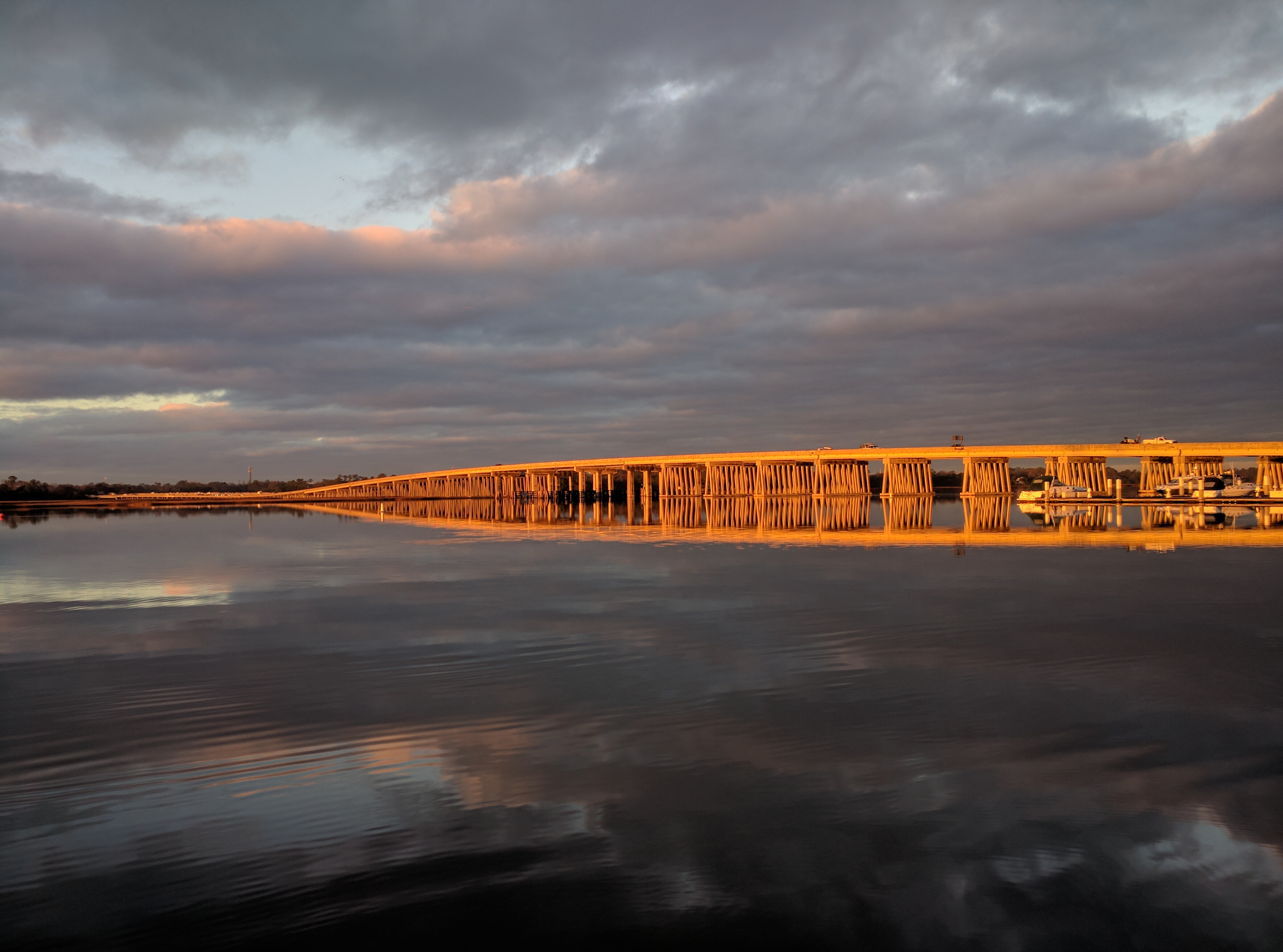
- Coordinates: 32°50′04″N 80°01′31″W
- Carries: I-526
- Crosses: Ashley River
- Locale: Charleston, SC - North Charleston, SC
- Official name: General William C. Westmoreland Bridge
- Maintained by: South Carolina Department of Transportation

Characteristics
- Design: Stringer/Multi-beam or Girder
- Total length: 3907 feet (1191.2 m)
- Width: 40 feet (12m) each span
- Load limit: 45 metric tons
- Clearance above: 35 feet (10.7m)

History
- Construction end: 1980

Statistics
- Daily traffic: 82,800 (2019)
- Toll: none

The General William C. Westmoreland Bridge connects the city of North Charleston with the West Ashley area of Charleston in South Carolina. Composed of twin spans, it carries two lanes of Interstate 526 in each direction across the Ashley River and the surrounding marshes. It is often referred to as simply the "Westmoreland Bridge".

The highway was named for General William C. Westmoreland, a South Carolina native and graduate of West Point. He is perhaps best known for being a commander of US forces during the Vietnam War.
