= Citadel Square Baptist Church =

Church in Charleston, South Carolina, US

Coordinates: 32.787312°N 79.934274°W

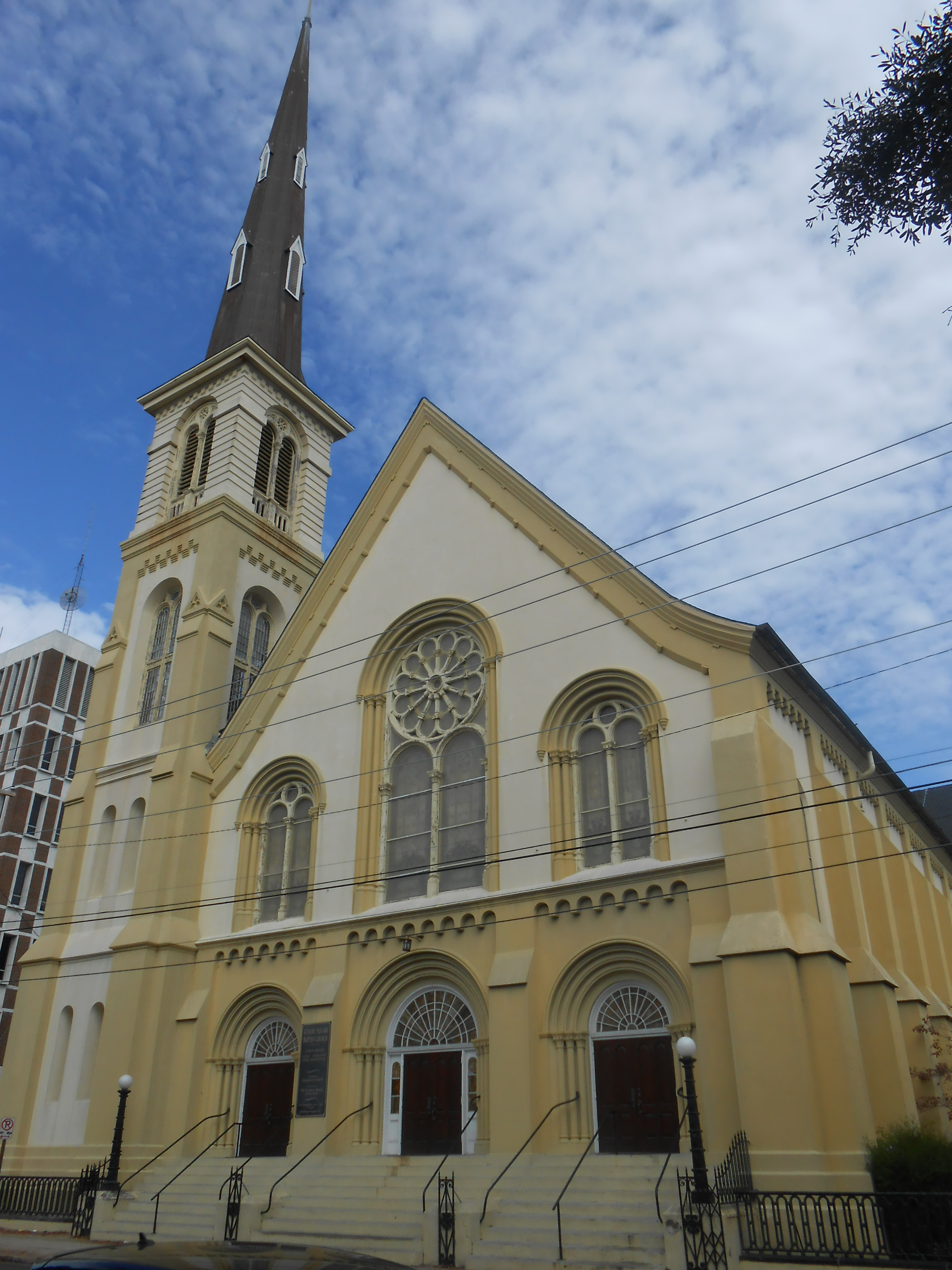

Citadel Square Church was the fourth baptist church built in Charleston, South Carolina. The church began as an outgrowth of the First Baptist Church when, in 1854, a dozen members sought permission to establish a new church for the upper peninsula. The new church was to have been known as the Fourth Baptist Church but, when an existing baptist church closed, leaving only three baptist churches, the name was changed to Citadel Square Church. The name refers to the church's location on upper Meeting St., immediately across from Marion Square, which at the time was the location of the Citadel Military College. In the 1880s the name was changed to Citadel Square Baptist Church.

The Charleston architectural firm Jones & Lee designed the building and construction of the church at 328 Meeting St. began in June 1855. The new building was opened on November 23, 1856. A hurricane in 1885 blew over the original steeple and a year later, the 1886 Charleston earthquake damaged the tower. The tower was repaired and a steeple designed by the Boston, Massachusetts architect Edward Silloway was installed. Following Hurricane Hugo, which blew the steeple off of the church, it was rebuilt at 210 feet, shorter than the steeple of St. Matthew's across Marion Square; the choice was to avoid a race for the tallest steeple.

A Sunday school building added in 1891 was replaced in 1921. In 1911 the existing organ was replaced with two new organs (a three-manual great organ and a celestial organ) built by the Moller Company, controlled by a single console. In April 1951, an educational building was added to the campus.

The church was the first in Charleston to televise its services, doing so for more than 40 years until ending the practice in 1998.

In August 2017, a church plant, Centerpoint Church, merged with Citadel Square.
