= Charles Graves House =

House in Charleston, South Carolina, US

Coordinates: 32.774131°N 79.934657°W

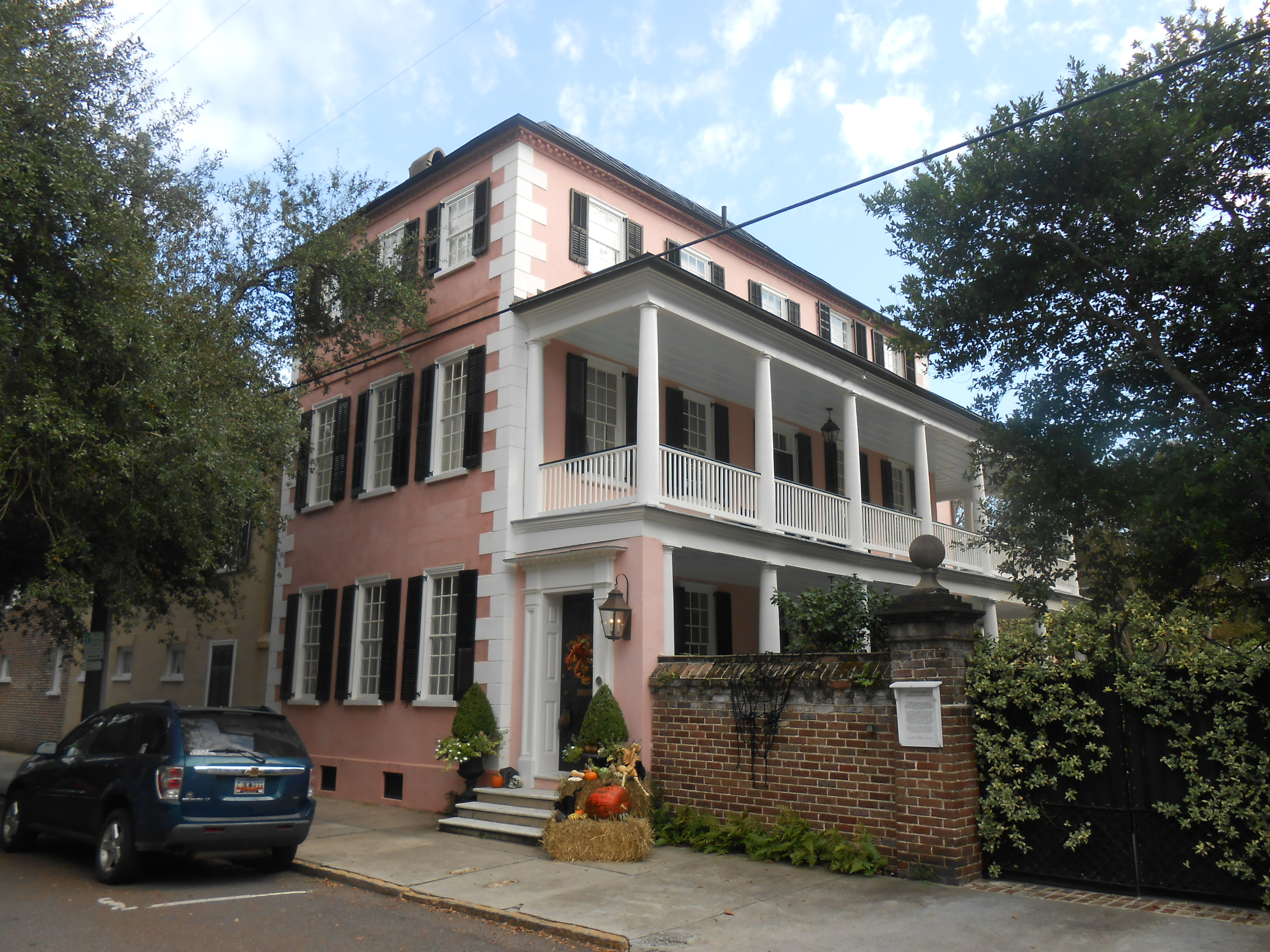
The Charles Graves House is one of the oldest on Tradd Street.

The Charles Graves House is a three-story brick residence constructed for Charles Graves at 123 Tradd Street in Charleston, South Carolina. The roof has a hip in it and the details exhibit styling of the Federal architecture period.

The interior follows the normal Charleston single house plan. There is a three-story stair hall in the center with a single room on either side. Most of the original Federal details have been retained. The entrance on the central portion of the side of the house exhibits Federal influence. It has a molded architrave as well as in the transom that is tall with tracery that is both neoclassical and fine. A two-story piazza with Tuscan columns, ceiling panels, and plain balusters is on the west facade. The house has brick covered in stucco that looks like stone, a string course made of bricks, quoining, and decorative brick work that looks like dentils. The original kitchen building is tied to the main house by a later addition.
