= James B. Edwards Bridge =

Wando River Bridge
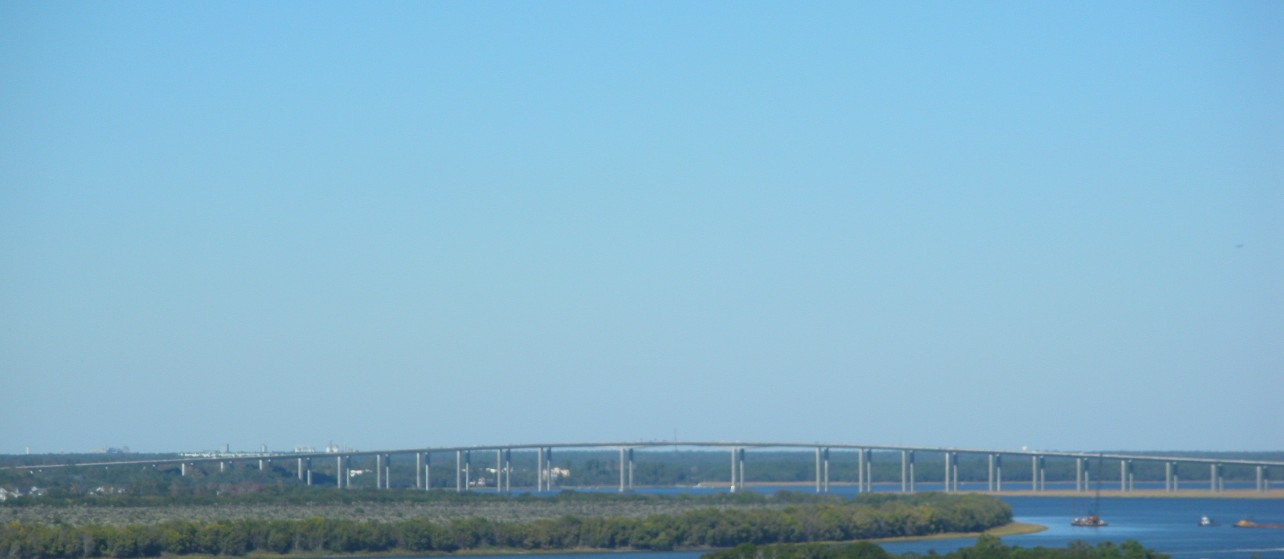
- James B. Edwards Bridge as seen from the Arthur Ravenel Bridge
- Coordinates: 32.8599°N 79.8966°W
- Carries: I-526
- Crosses: Wando River
- Locale: Charleston - Mount Pleasant, South Carolina
- Official name: James B. Edwards Bridge
- Maintained by: South Carolina Department of Transportation
- Website: wandobridge.com

Characteristics
- Design: FIGG Bridge Engineers
- Total length: 7,900 feet
- Width: Twin 44-foot (13 m) wide bridges

History
- Construction cost: $34 million
- Opened: 1989; 37 years ago

Statistics
- Daily traffic: 45,300

Location
- Interactive map of Wando River Bridge

The James B. Edwards Bridge, also referred to as the Wando River Bridge, is a pair of pre-cast post-tensioned concrete box girder bridges that span the Wando River between Mount Pleasant and Daniel Island on Interstate 526 (I-526) in South Carolina.

The bridge was designed by Figg Bridge Engineers and is owned and maintained by the South Carolina Department of Transportation. The bridge is named for James B. Edwards, who was a governor of South Carolina, Secretary of Energy, and long-time president of the Medical University of South Carolina.

== Construction ==
The bridge was constructed of pre-cast concrete segments using top-down construction. Segments were transported along already completed spans and put in place from above. This construction method was selected to reduce construction impacts on the marsh areas along the banks of the Wando River. The bridge is designed and built to accommodate six lanes of traffic with narrow shoulders, and has been used for four since opening. The construction contractor was T.L. James Associates of Louisiana.

The bridge has a history of issues that arose during or from the construction. Allegations about the workmanship led to a year-long investigation which found no issues. The construction contract ended in countersuits with the SCDOT suing for delays and the contractor suing for design deficiencies. This resulted in a $4.9 million settlement paid to the contractor. Aluminum expansion joints installed on the bridge failed within four years, which required SCDOT to install replacements at a cost of $2 million. And the profile of the bridge deck would cause discomfort (vertical pitching of motorists).

== 2018 Post-tensioning failure ==
A failure of post-tensioning cables, which are inside the box girder of the bridge, caused a closure of the westbound spans mid-day on May 14, 2018. Weekly inspections of the 92 cables inside the bridge had been occurring since a repair project in 2016. On Sunday May 20, 2018 the eastbound lanes were altered to allow two-way traffic while repairs to the westbound side take place. The westbound span reopened to traffic on June 2, 2018. A 2800-page November 28, 2018 engineering report provided fourteen recommendations which will be implemented to ensure the bridge meets its design life of 75 years. The recommendations include the installation of redundant post-tensioning cables.
