= Wild Dunes =

Wild Dunes at Isle of Palms, South Carolina
- City
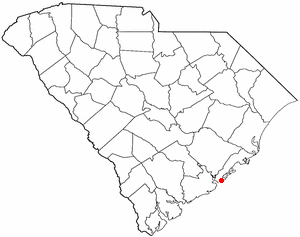
- Location of Wild Dunes in South Carolina
- Coordinates: 32°47′47″N 79°45′54″W
- Country: United States
- State: South Carolina
- County: Charleston

Area
  - Total: 2.5 sq mi (6.4 km^{2})
- Elevation: 3.3 ft (1 m)
- Time zone: UTC-5 (EST)
  - Summer (DST): UTC-4 (EDT)
- ZIP code: 29451
- Area codes: 843, 854
- Website: www.wilddunes.com

Wild Dunes is an oceanfront resort on Isle of Palms, South Carolina, United States. It is 1,600 acres (6 km^{2}) on the north end of the island and has controlled-access gates.

== Information ==
Wild Dunes was developed in 1972.

Wild Dunes has two famous golf courses on it: the Wild Dunes Links Course, and the Harbor Course, both designed by Tom Fazio. It also has a nationally ranked tennis complex with 17 clay courts, and an award-winning family recreation program.

In early 2008, large-scale beach erosion led to the depletion of the beachfront area of Wild Dunes. The beachfront was greatly reduced, waterfront buildings received structural damage, and the 18th hole of the Links Golf Course was washed out. After a lengthy process, at the end of the Summer of 2008 the City of Isle of Palms finished repairing the beach. Approximately 900,000 cubic feet (25,000 m^{3}) of sand was pumped in from offshore, leading to the restoration of over 150 yards of beachfront. Also, the 18th hole of the Links Course has been repaired, but is now a Par 3 instead of the old Par 5. Wild Dunes worked with the golf course designer Tom Fazio to restore the course's final hole to the Par 5 it used to be, a task that was completed in 2009.
