= Interstate 526 =

Highway in South Carolina

Interstate 526
- Mark Clark Expressway
- I-526 highlighted in red; future section in blue; unbuilt future section in orange

Route information
- Auxiliary route of I-26
- Maintained by SCDOT
- Length: 19.56 mi (31.48 km)
- Existed: 1989–present
- NHS: Entire route

Major junctions
- West end: US 17 / SC 7 in Charleston
- I-26 in North Charleston; US 52 / US 78 in North Charleston
- East end: US 17 / I-526 BS in Mount Pleasant

Location
- Country: United States
- State: South Carolina
- Counties: Charleston, Berkeley

Highway system
- Interstate Highway System; Main; Auxiliary; Suffixed; Business; Future; South Carolina State Highway System; Interstate; US; State; Scenic
← SC 522	→ SC 527

Interstate 526 (I-526) is a 19.56-mile (31.48 km) auxiliary route of I-26, providing a partial beltway around Charleston, South Carolina, in the United States. The route serves several purposes, firstly, as a bypass for through traffic on U.S. Route 17 (US 17) to avoid downtown Charleston, and, secondly, for traffic on I-26 bound for the coastal towns located north and south of Charleston. The route is not yet complete, as the western terminus it is planned for the route to be extended an additional 10 miles (16 km). After the eastern terminus, the roadway continues as a short business route, known as Interstate 526 Business (I-526 Bus.).

== Route description ==
I-526 begins at an incomplete interchange with US 17 (Savannah Highway) and South Carolina Highway 7 (SC 7, Sam Rittenberg Boulevard) in the West Ashley section of the city of Charleston, just north of the Stono River. The interchange includes a loop ramp from northbound US 17, a ramp from southbound US 17, and a half-diamond interchange with SC 7. The four-lane freeway heads north past the Citadel Mall and meets SC 461 at a partial cloverleaf interchange. SC 461 heads west as Glenn McConnell Parkway and east as Paul Cantrell Boulevard; both directions lead to SC 61 (Ashley River Road). I-526 crosses SC 61 and uses the General William C. Westmoreland Bridge to cross the Ashley River into the city of North Charleston. The freeway has diamond interchanges with Leeds Avenue and SC 642 (Dorchester Road) and crosses over CSX's Charleston Subdivision.

I-526 continues through a connected pair of half-diamond interchanges with Montague Avenue and International Boulevard. Both streets lead to the North Charleston Coliseum and Charles Towne Square; the latter one is the access road for Charleston International Airport. The Interstate curves east and reaches its junction with I-26, which is a cloverleaf interchange except for a flyover ramp from eastbound I-526 to westbound I-26. I-526 crosses over Norfolk Southern Railway's SC Line and has a partial cloverleaf interchange with Rivers Avenue, which carries US 52 and US 78. The Interstate continues from its overpass of the U.S. Routes as a viaduct above wetlands along Filbin Creek. The viaduct crosses over the CSX rail line again and has a four-ramp partial cloverleaf interchange with Rhett Avenue and a half-diamond interchange with Virginia Avenue. The Rhett Avenue interchange includes a U-turn ramp that allows access from westbound I-526 to Virginia Avenue and from the avenue to eastbound I-526.

I-526 crosses the Cooper River on the high-level Don N. Holt Bridge and enters the Daniel Island section of the city of Charleston in Berkeley County. The freeway has partial cloverleaf interchanges on either side of Beresford Creek with Clements Ferry Road and Seven Farms Drive/River Landing Drive. Both interchanges lead to the Credit One Stadium, home of the Charleston Open. I-526 continues southeast across the Wando River on the James B. Edwards Bridge back into Charleston County and the town of Mount Pleasant. The freeway has a partial cloverleaf interchange with Long Point Road and curves south at Hobcaw Creek. I-526 has a partial flyover interchange to and from US 17 in the direction of Georgetown before the Interstate reaches its eastern terminus at a partial cloverleaf interchange with US 17 (Johnnie Dodds Boulevard). The highway continues as I-526 Bus., a four-lane highway that follows Chuck Dawley Boulevard to SC 703 in the center of Mount Pleasant.

All of I-526 is included as part of the National Highway System, a system of roadways important to the nation's economy, defense, and mobility.

== History ==
Planning of the freeway dates back to the 1960s; construction on the first section began in 1979. Opened in 1982 as an unnumbered freeway, it traversed from Ashley River Road (SC 61) to Leeds Avenue, crossing over the Ashley River.

In 1985, the freeway became SC 31, connecting US 17/SC 7 to Dorchester Road (SC 642). By 1987, it extended to International Boulevard, providing access to the Charleston International Airport.

In 1989, the freeway was rechristened as I-526 after it connected with I-26 (exit 212). In 1992, I-526 was extended east over the Cooper River to Daniel Island, then over the Wando River to Mount Pleasant and its current eastern terminus with US 17 and I-526 Bus.

In 1993, the Robert B. Scarborough Bridge was opened, connecting downtown Charleston with James Island; it is signed as SC 30. Since 1993, several residents and groups in the area have fought against the completion of I-526, which will connect both James Island and Johns Island. Approximately 10 miles (16 km) separate the eastern terminus of I-526's current extent from the eastern terminus of SC 30. The mileage markers and exit numbers on both SC 30 and I-526 are based on an eventual merging of the routes, with miles 1 to 3 occurring on SC 30 and miles 10 to 30 used on the current I-526 route.

== Future ==
The proposed missing section of I-526 was the subject of an environmental study that was completed in early 2014. Various alternative routings and options are being reviewed, but the general plan is to extend south from US 17 to Johns Island and then east to James Island, where it will connect with SC 30 (possibly renumbering it). Some alternatives shown include the possibility that it will be built in expressway grade instead, falling short of being labeled an Interstate Highway.

Citing Charleston County's inability to provide funds to cover the project's increased cost, the State Transportation Infrastructure Bank (SIB) board voted on May 26, 2016, to abandon the proposed extension of I-526 across James and Johns Islands.

In 2021, SCDOT revived the 526-extension project. As of May 2023, they are aiming to start construction by 2025. In December 2023, the South Carolina Joint Bond Review Committee approved the state's Transportation Infrastructure Bank's action Tuesday afternoon of providing $75 million for preliminary costs in the project, which is dubbed the Mark Clark Extension Project.

On May 12th, 2025, the SIB voted once again to abandon the project, citing Charleston County's failure to pass a half-percent sales tax to help fund the project.

== Exit list ==
County	Location	mi	km	Exit	Destinations	Notes
Charleston	Charleston	10.00	16.09	10	US 17 (Savannah Highway) / SC 7 (Sam Rittenburg Boulevard) – Savannah	Western terminus
Charleston	Charleston	11.39	18.33	11	SC 461 (Paul Cantrell Boulevard / Glenn McConnell Parkway) to SC 61 (Ashley River Road)	Split into exits 11A (south) and 11B (north)
Charleston	Ashley River			General William C. Westmoreland Bridge		
Charleston	North Charleston	13.91	22.39	14	Leeds Avenue	
Charleston	North Charleston	14.74	23.72	15	SC 642 (Dorchester Road) / Paramount Drive	
Charleston	North Charleston	15.58	25.07	16	Montague Avenue / International Boulevard – Charleston International Airport	Split into exits 16A (Montague Avenue and International Boulevard) and 16B (Airport) eastbound
Charleston	North Charleston	17.04	27.42	17	I-26 – Charleston, Columbia	Split into exits 17A (east) and 17B (west) westbound
Charleston	North Charleston	17.65	28.40	18	US 52 / US 78 (Rivers Avenue)	Split into exits 18A (east) and 18B (west)
Charleston	North Charleston	19.09	30.72	19	North Rhett Avenue	Includes direct U-turn ramp from westbound I-526 exit to eastbound I-526 entrance
Charleston	North Charleston	19.39	31.21	20	Virginia Avenue	Eastbound exit and westbound entrance; movements between Virginia Avenue and I-526 to and from Mount Pleasant are made using the exit 19 U-turn ramp
Cooper River				Don N. Holt Bridge		
Berkeley	Charleston	22.50	36.21	23	Clements Ferry Road	Split into exits 23A (south) and 23B (north) eastbound
Berkeley	Charleston	23.96	38.56	24	River Landing Drive / Seven Farms Drive / Island Park Drive – Daniel Island	
Wando River				James B. Edwards Bridge		
Charleston	Mount Pleasant	27.46	44.19	28	Long Point Road	
Charleston	Mount Pleasant	28.69	46.17	29	US 17 north – Georgetown	Eastbound exit and westbound entrance
Charleston	Mount Pleasant	29.56	47.57	30	US 17 (Johnnie Dodds Boulevard) / I-526 BS east (Chuck Dawley Boulevard) to SC 703 – Charleston	Eastern terminus; roadway continues as I-526 Bus.; no access from eastbound I-526 to northbound US 17 or from southbound US 17 to westbound I-526
1.000 mi = 1.609 km; 1.000 km = 0.621 mi: Incomplete access

== Interstate 526 Business ==
Interstate 526 Business
- Location: Mount Pleasant, South Carolina
- Length: 1.570 mi (2.527 km)
- Existed: 1992–present
- Tourist routes: South Carolina Heritage Corridor: Nature Route

Interstate 526 Business (I-526 Bus.), per the South Carolina Department of Transportation South Carolina Highway 526 Spur, is a 1.57-mile (2.53 km) four-lane boulevard-grade business spur of I-526 along Chuck Dawley Boulevard between Johnnie Dodds Boulevard (US 17) and Ben Sawyer Boulevard (SC 703). Its one of the two business spurs that is well signed in state along with I-20 Bus. in Florence. Its also entirely concurrent with the SC Nature Route.

I-526 Bus. is not part of the National Highway System.

The entire route is in Mount Pleasant, Charleston County.

mi	km	Destinations	Notes
0.000	0.000	I-526 west / US 17 (Johnnie Dodds Boulevard) – North Charleston, Charleston, Georgetown	Western terminus; continuation as I-526; former US 701
1.570	2.527	SC 703 (Ben Sawyer Boulevard) – Charleston, Sullivan's Island	Eastern terminus
1.000 mi = 1.609 km; 1.000 km = 0.621 mi
