= Charleston single house =

Form of house found in Charleston, South Carolina

A Charleston single house is a form of house found in Charleston, South Carolina. A single house has its narrow side (often two- or three-bays wide) with a gable end along the street and a longer side (often five-bays) running perpendicular to the street. The house is well-suited to long, narrow lots which were laid out in early Charleston. Despite the popularity of the story, single houses were not built to avoid taxes that were, according to the tales, based on the width of the house; no evidence supports anything about such fanciful myths.

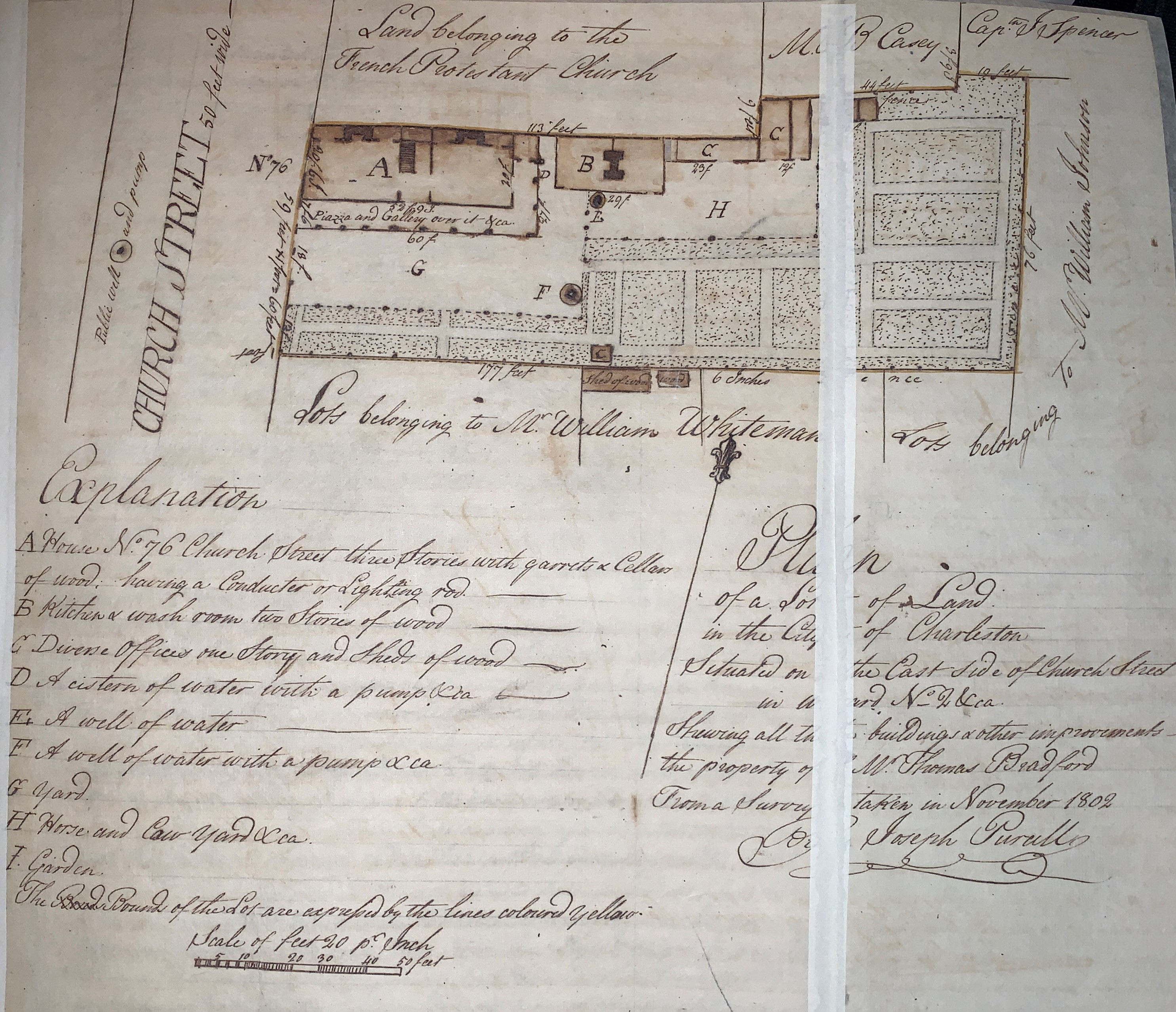
A plat from 1802 showing 134 Church Street included the interior layout of the Charleston single house with extensive rear buildings and gardens.

Although the form can be found across historic Charleston in a variety of styles (e.g., Federal, Greek Revival, and Victorian), the consistent feature is interior layout. A front door on the long side of the house, halfway along the side perpendicular to the street, opens onto a short central hall and staircase. There is one room on each side of the hall, that is, one toward the street and one toward the rear of the house. The result is a building which is only one room wide when viewed from the street, giving the form its popular name. Each floor contained two rooms, and the floorplan was reproduced on each upper floor.

Although not a part of the earliest single houses, later buildings had two- and three-story porches, known locally as piazzas, added. The piazzas always appear on the side of the house with the front door which, to take best advantage of local winds and shield interiors from the most intense sun, will be the south or west side.

The Charleston single house typology, which emerged in the early eighteenth century, is believed to have been influenced by Caribbean architecture. In particular, these houses bear notable similarities to the multi-story Dutch mercantile buildings constructed in Barbados during the late seventeenth century. Barbados was a significant point of origin for many of Charleston's early settlers.

Often, you will see ceilings of the piazza porches painted in haint blue – a sky blue color believed to repel a "haint", a Gullah term for an evil witchlike being. The Gullahs or Gullah Geechees are Africans who were brought to Charleston and its Sea Islands from Angola during the Transatlantic Slave Trade. Ship captains referred to them as "Africans from Gola", which eventually evolved into "Gullah".

Service areas were often located in separate buildings behind the house. A single house would typically be built along one edge of a property, leaving a carriage way along the opposite side of a narrow lot. A piazza, if part of the house, would run the length of the house along the side yard which could be entered from the street. Alternatively, most single houses with piazzas have what appears to be a front door immediately on the street. However, the "front door" is in reality merely a screen between the public sidewalk and the private piazza. The actual front door for the house is located halfway along the piazza.

This street-facing door into the piazza is called a "hospitality door". Historically, the status of the door was a social cue to neighbors and friends. If the porch door was open, the family was ready for visitors. If the door was closed, that was a signal to leave the home undisturbed.

== Gallery ==
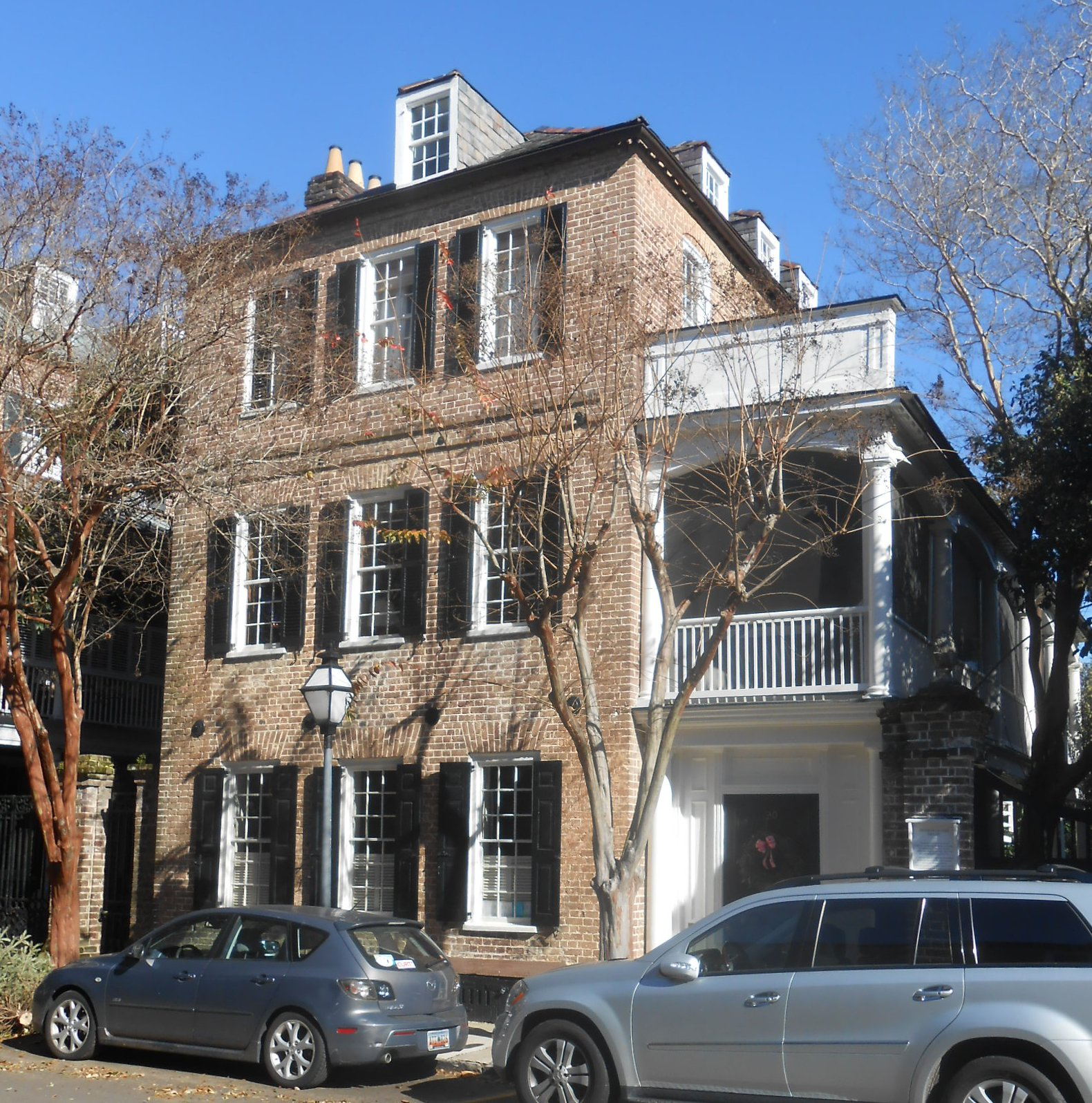
Thomas Legare House, ca 1759. An outstanding example of an early Georgian style Charleston single house well adapted to the narrow lot purchased in 1752. In 1816 an adjacent house was demolished to provide space for the walled garden and elegant Regency piazzas

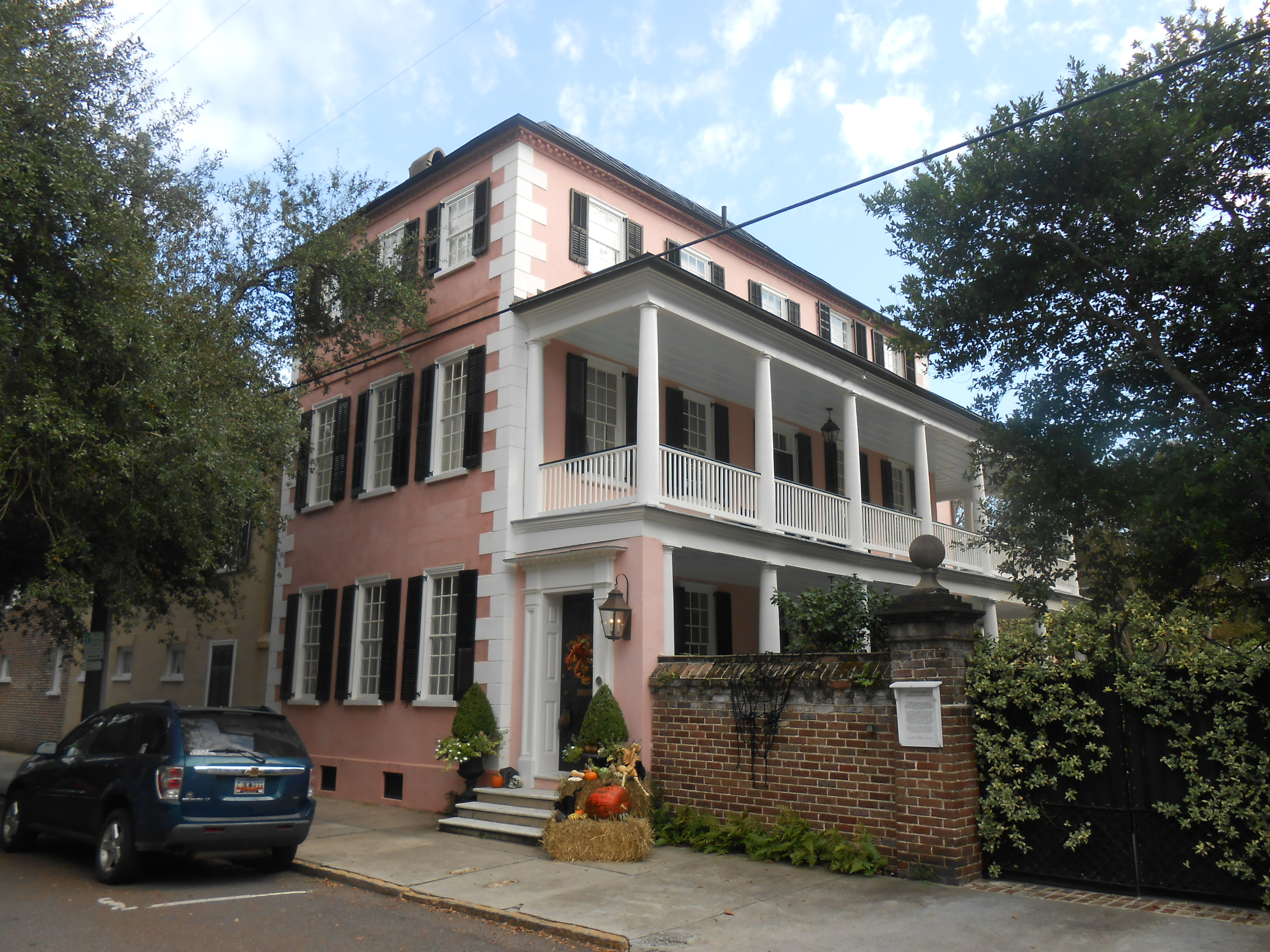
The Charles Graves House at 123 Tradd Street, Charleston, South Carolina is a classic example of a single house, with its narrow end facing the street, a false front door screen a piazza, and a true front door halfway along the longer side of the house

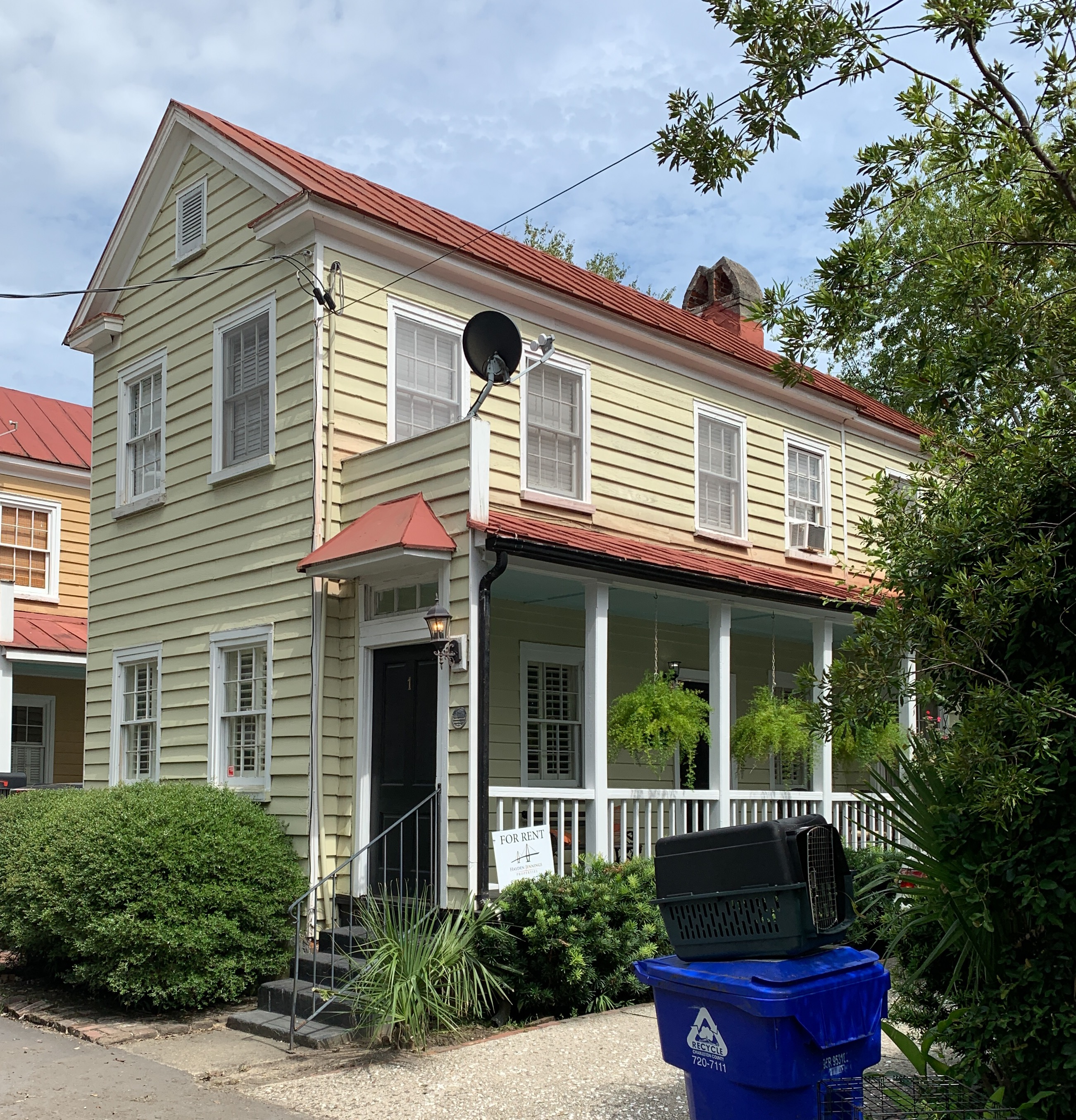
Single houses range from very fine, large houses to very humble versions such as 1 Murphy's Court with only two floors and a single story piazza.

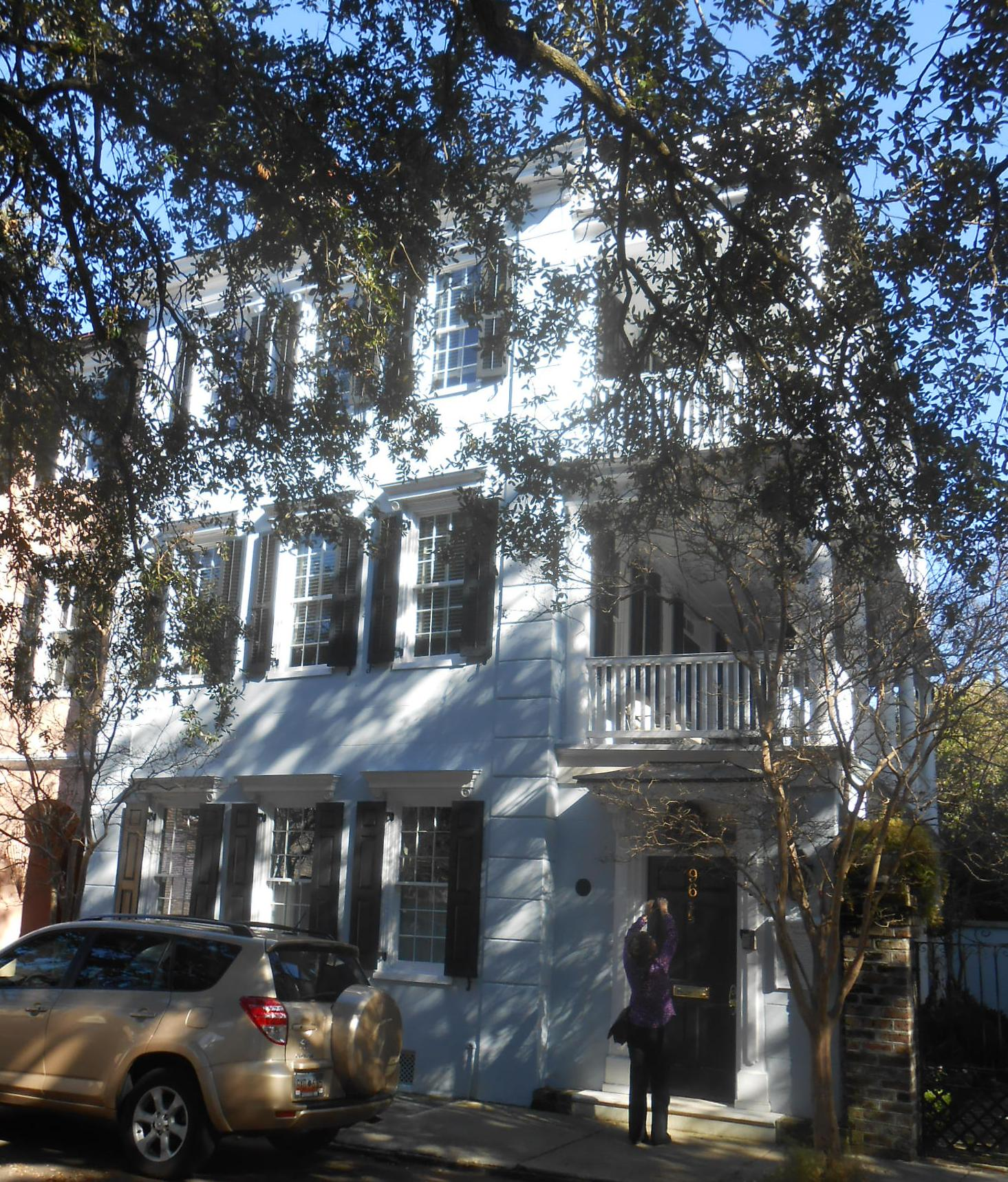
Ann Peacock House, built ca. 1760. The front portion of this fine example of the Charleston Single House was built on part of the original lots in the Grand Model of Charles Towne.

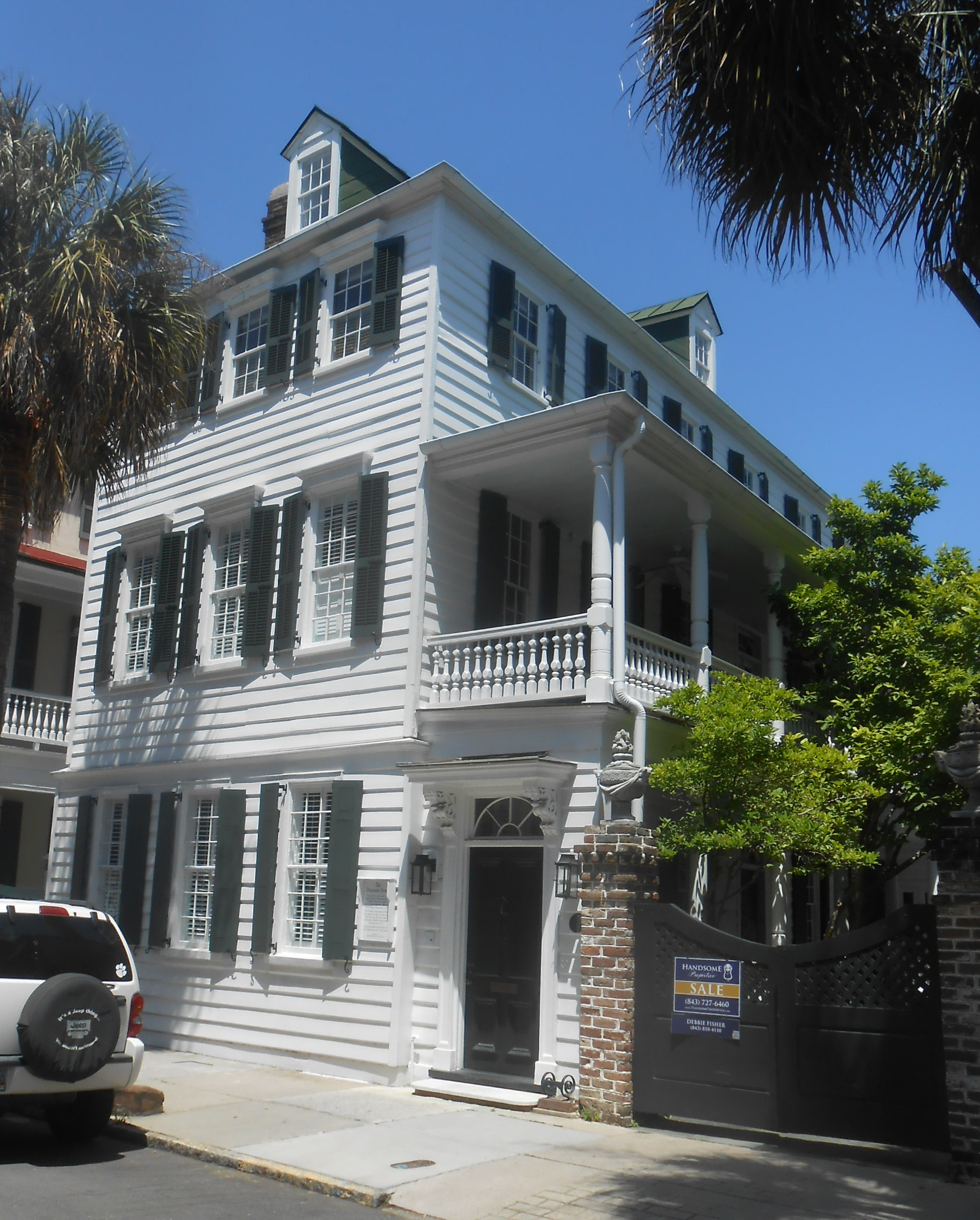
The Douxsaint House, part of the Grand Model, a Charleston single house of French type construction appears to have been built in the mid 1700s and is one of the two houses in its block that escaped the Great Fire of 1775

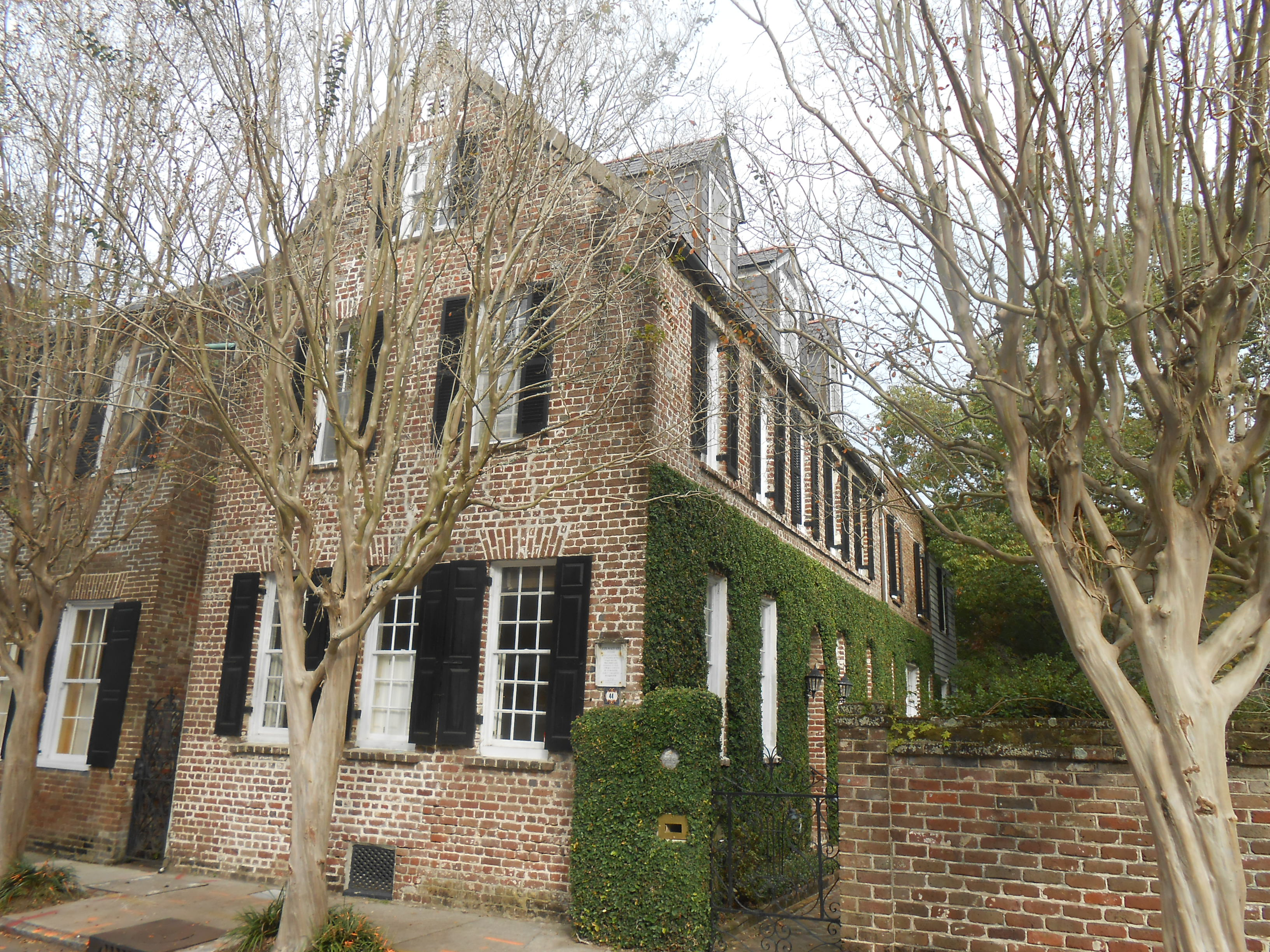
The John McKee House, 44 King St., Charleston, South Carolina
