= Isle of Palms, South Carolina =

Barrier island on the coast of South Carolina, United States

- City
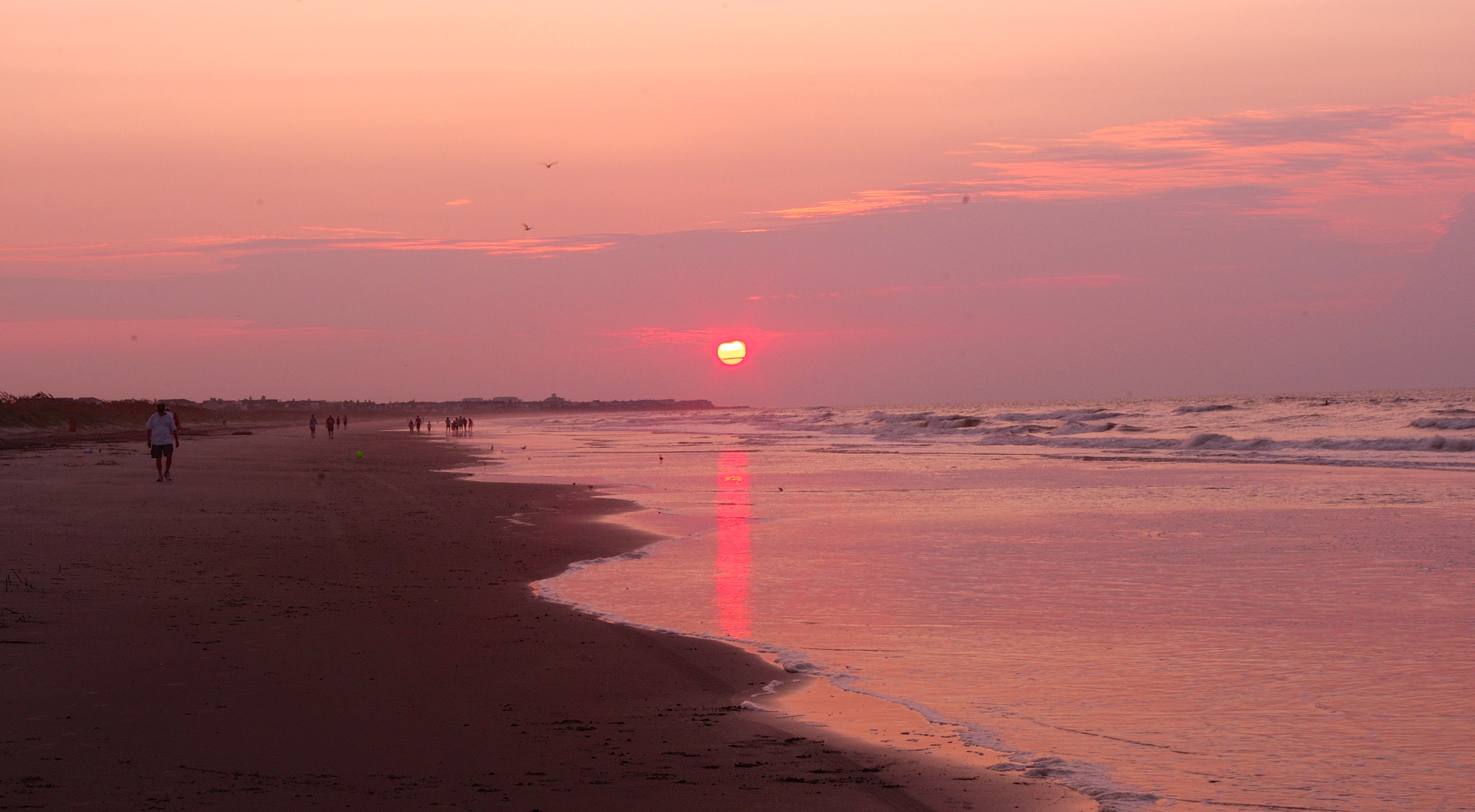
- Isle of Palms at sunrise

- Seal

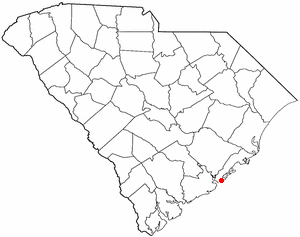
- Location of Isle of Palms in South Carolina
- Coordinates: 32°48′28″N 79°44′42″W
- Country: United States
- State: South Carolina
- County: Charleston
- Incorporated: 1938 (town), 1957 (city)

Area
  - Total: 5.44 sq mi (14.08 km^{2})
  - Land: 4.44 sq mi (11.49 km^{2})
  - Water: 1.00 sq mi (2.59 km^{2})
- Elevation: 7 ft (2.1 m)

Population (2020)
  - Total: 4,347
  - Density: 979.9/sq mi (378.36/km^{2})
- Time zone: UTC−5 (EST)
  - Summer (DST): UTC−4 (EDT)
- ZIP code: 29451
- Area code: 843, 854
- FIPS code: 45-36115
- GNIS feature ID: 2404771
- Website: www.isleofpalms.gov

Isle of Palms is a city in Charleston County, South Carolina, United States. As of the 2020 census, Isle of Palms had a population of 4,347. It is a barrier island on the South Carolina coast. The city is included within the Charleston-North Charleston-Summerville metropolitan area and the Charleston-North Charleston Urbanized Area. The town lies along a narrow strip of land, hugging the beach, separated from the mainland by the Intracoastal Waterway.

== Geography ==
Isle of Palms is located along the Atlantic Ocean, 15 miles (24 km) by road just east of downtown Charleston. According to the United States Census Bureau, the city of Isle of Palms has a total area of 5.4 square miles (14.1 km^{2}), of which 4.4 square miles (11.5 km^{2}) is land, and 1.0 square mile (2.6 km^{2}) (18.40%) is water.

== Demographics ==
Historical population
Census	Pop.	Note	%±
1960	1,186		—
1970	2,657		124.0%
1980	3,421		28.8%
1990	3,680		7.6%
2000	4,583		24.5%
2010	4,133		−9.8%
2020	4,347		5.2%
U.S. Decennial Census

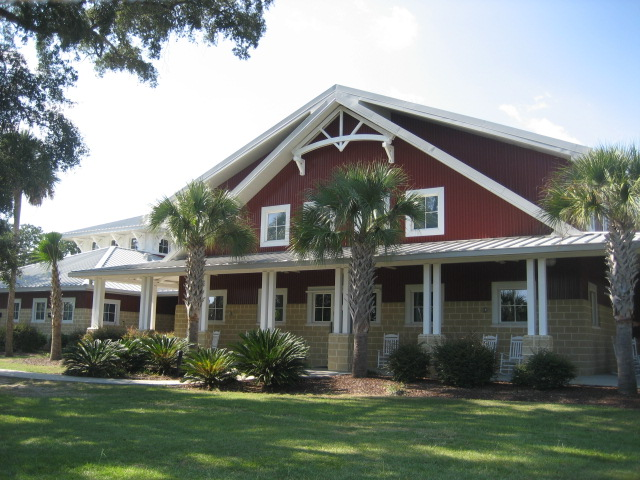
Isle of Palms Recreation Department

=== 2020 census ===
As of the 2020 census, Isle of Palms had a population of 4,347, with 1,877 households and 1,325 families residing in the city.

The median age was 56.2 years, with 16.0% of residents under the age of 18 and 32.6% aged 65 or older.

For every 100 females there were 94.9 males, and for every 100 females age 18 and over there were 93.4 males age 18 and over.

100.0% of residents lived in urban areas, while 0.0% lived in rural areas.

There were 1,877 households, of which 20.2% had children under the age of 18 living in them. Of all households, 66.6% were married-couple households, 11.6% were households with a male householder and no spouse or partner present, and 18.9% were households with a female householder and no spouse or partner present. About 22.5% of all households were made up of individuals and 11.4% had someone living alone who was 65 years of age or older.

There were 4,485 housing units, of which 58.1% were vacant. The homeowner vacancy rate was 2.7% and the rental vacancy rate was 76.5%.

Racial composition as of the 2020 census
Race	Number	Percent
White	4,114	94.6%
Black or African American	12	0.3%
American Indian and Alaska Native	2	0.0%
Asian	35	0.8%
Native Hawaiian and Other Pacific Islander	2	0.0%
Some other race	24	0.6%
Two or more races	158	3.6%
Hispanic or Latino (of any race)	93	2.1%

=== 2010 census ===
As of the census of 2010, there were 4,133 people living in the city. The population density was 743.6 inhabitants per square mile (287.1/km^{2}). There were 4,274 housing units at an average density of 868.7 per square mile (335.4/km^{2}). The racial makeup of the city was 97.65% White, 1.06% Hispanic or Latino, 0.56% African American, 0.75% Asian, 0.15% Native American, 0.17% from other races, and 0.73% from two or more races.

There were 1,828 households, of which 20.1% had children under the age of 18 living with them, 62.4% were married couples living together, 6.4% had a female householder with no husband present, and 28.8% were non-families. 20.9% of all households were made up of individuals, and 7.5% had someone living alone who was 65 years of age or older. The average household size was 2.26 and the average family size was 2.66.

The city population was spread out, with 17.0% under the age of 18, 3.2% from 18 to 24, 23.8% from 25 to 49, 31.8% from 50 to 64, and 22.6% who were 65 years of age or older. The median age was 47. For every 100 females, there were 98 males.

The median income for a household in the city was $76,170, and the median income for a family was $88,874. Males had a median income of $60,640 versus $37,500 for females. The per capita income for the city was $44,221. About 1.7% of families and 3.4% of the population were below the poverty line, including 4.3% of those under age 18 and 1.0% of those age 65 or over.

== Government ==
The city is run by an elected Mayor-council government system.

=== Mayor ===
Phillip Pounds.

=== Council members ===
Randy Bell, Ryan L. Buckhannon, Jimmy Carroll (Mayor), John Moye, Kevin Popson, Phillip Pounds, Rusty Streetman, Susan Hill Smith, Jimmy Ward.

== History ==
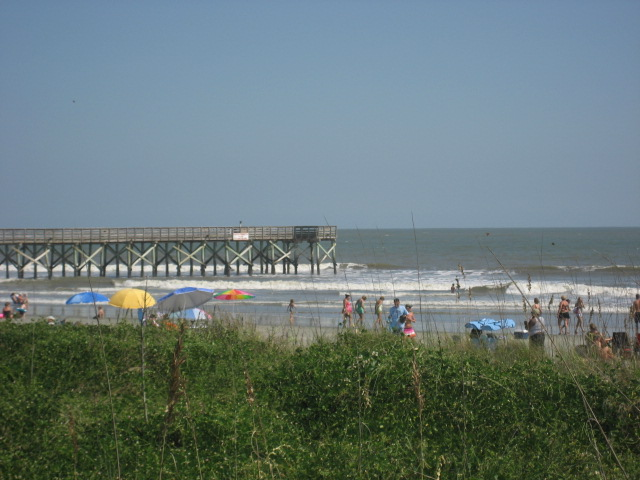
The beach at Isle of Palms

The island's original inhabitants were the Sewee tribe.

During the Civil War, the Confederate submarine H.L. Hunley departed from Breach Inlet, between Isle of Palms and neighboring Sullivan's Island.

In the late nineteenth century, local residents began using the island as a vacation spot. At that time it was only accessible by ferry. It was bought by J.S. Lawrence in 1899, who gave the island its current name; before then it was known as "Hunting Island" or "Long Island". A 50-room hotel was built in 1906. In 1912, James Sottile had a beach pavilion and an amusement park built, and a trolley line was constructed from Mount Pleasant on the mainland to Isle of Palms via Sullivan's Island. In 1929, Grace Memorial Bridge was built between Charleston and Mount Pleasant to allow automobile traffic to reach the island.

Large-scale residential development began when J.C. Long bought up most of the island and built low-cost housing for World War II veterans. In 1975, the Sea Pines Company (of Hilton Head Island fame) established the 900-acre (360 ha) development now known as the Wild Dunes Beach and Racquet Club.

E. Lee Spence, a pioneer underwater archaeologist and prolific author of books and articles about shipwrecks and sunken treasure, discovered, with the help of Isle of Palms residents Wally Shaffer and George Campsen, many shipwrecks along the shores of the Isle of Palms in the 1960s. Their discoveries included the Civil War blockade runners Rattlesnake, Stonewall Jackson, Mary Bowers, Constance, Norseman and Georgiana. The iron-hulled steamer Georgiana, which was sunk on her maiden voyage, was described in contemporary documents as pierced for 14 guns and more powerful than the famous Confederate cruiser Alabama. These historic discoveries resulted in the passage of South Carolina's Underwater Antiquities Act allowing the archaeological salvage of shipwrecks. During Hurricane Hugo, which struck September 21, 1989, much of the island was flooded by the storm surge.

The northeastern end of the Isle of Palms, home to Wild Dunes private community, endured a severe erosion crisis when a shoal caused sand to wash away from the foundation of a large condominium building. The city undertook a controversial beach restoration project in the spring and summer of 2008 which replenished the beach with dredged sand and saved the threatened structures.

In March 2015, Doris Spann Argoe, an Isle of Palms resident, was charged with murder in the shooting death of her husband, Jonathan Argoe, at their home on 24th Avenue. Argoe admitted to shooting her husband during an argument and cutting herself to stage a self-defense claim.

In February 2019, it was reported that the city's police force was undergoing a crisis following several resignations.

On April 7, 2023, 6 people were injured in a mass shooting.

=== County parks ===
The Charleston County Park and Recreation Commission (CCPRC) operates numerous facilities within Charleston County including Isle of Palms County Park.

Marinas and boat landings:

- Cooper River Marina
- Multiple county-wide boat landings

== See also ==
- Lucas v. South Carolina Coastal Council
- Her Own Way
