= National Register of Historic Places listings in Jasper County, South Carolina =

List of historic places in Jasper County, South Carolina

Location of Jasper County in South Carolina

This is a list of the National Register of Historic Places listings in Jasper County, South Carolina.

This list is intended to be a complete compilation of the properties and districts on the National Register of Historic Places in Jasper County, South Carolina, United States. The geographic coordinates provided for many properties enable these locations to be viewed collectively on a Google Maps map.

There are currently 10 properties listed on the National Register in the county. An additional property was once listed but has since been removed.

This National Park Service list is complete through NPS recent listings posted March 13, 2026.

== Current listings ==
	Name on the Register	Image	Date listed	Location	City or town	Description
1	Church of the Holy Trinity	Church of the Holy Trinity	March 25, 1982 (#82003869)	Secondary Highways S-27-13 and S-27-29; 32°28′12″N 80°57′55″W	Ridgeland	Built c. 1858, this Episcopal church features Gothic Revival architecture and served as a place of worship and refuge during the Civil War.
2	Gillisonville Baptist Church	Gillisonville Baptist Church	May 14, 1971 (#71000786)	U.S. Route 278; 32°36′26″N 80°59′52″W	Gillisonville	A Greek Revival-style church built in 1838, spared during the Civil War and still in use today.
3	Honey Hill-Boyd's Neck Battlefield	Honey Hill-Boyd's Neck Battlefield	July 3, 2004 (#04000655)	Near Honey Hill, east of Ridgeland; 32°28′56″N 80°56′04″W	Ridgeland	Site of the 1864 Civil War Battle of Honey Hill, where Union forces attempted to cut the Charleston–Savannah railroad.
4	Old House Plantation	Old House Plantation	October 6, 1997 (#97001159)	Near Old House on SC Highway 462; 32°27′28″N 80°53′52″W	Ridgeland	Site of the burial of Thomas Heyward, Jr., signer of the Declaration of Independence. Plantation ruins remain.
5	Jasper County Courthouse	Jasper County Courthouse	October 30, 1981 (#81000566)	Russell Street; 32°29′03″N 80°59′08″W	Ridgeland	Constructed in 1915, designed by architect William Augustus Edwards in the Classical Revival style.
6	J.C. Richardson House	J.C. Richardson House	September 22, 2014 (#14000709)	67 Gillison Branch Rd. 32°35′12″N 81°11′51″W	Robertville	An example of rural Southern architecture, built c. 1880, associated with prominent African American educator J.C. Richardson.
7	Robertville Baptist Church	Robertville Baptist Church	February 23, 1972 (#72001213)	Junction of U.S. Route 321 and County Road 26; 32°35′10″N 81°11′58″W	Robertville	Built in 1845, it is one of the oldest remaining church structures in the county. J. C. Richardson house (Robertville, South Carolina)
8	Sinclair Service Station	Sinclair Service Station	October 13, 2015 (#15000736)	10782 Jacob Smart Blvd. 32°28′49″N 80°58′49″W	Ridgeland	Restored 1930s service station, now the Morris Center for Lowcountry Heritage.
9	Tillman School	Tillman School	June 21, 2016 (#16000396)	191 Cotton Hill Rd. (U.S. 321); 32°27′57″N 81°06′33″W	Tillman	Historic African American school built in 1926; part of efforts to improve education during segregation.
10	White Hall Plantation House Ruins and Oak Avenue	White Hall Plantation House Ruins and Oak Avenue	October 27, 2000 (#98000423)	Off SC Highway 336, west of Old House; 32°28′07″N 80°55′28″W	Ridgeland	Also known as Good Hope Plantation; ruins of an 18th-century plantation home and oak-lined avenue remain.

== Former listing ==
	Name on the Register	Image	Date listed	Date removed	Location	City or town	Description
1	Grays Consolidated High School	Grays Consolidated High School	September 21, 2007 (#07000986)	August 9, 2016	U.S. Route 278; 32°40′26″N 81°01′18″W	Grays	Constructed in 1927; demolished in 2013 due to deterioration.

== See also ==
- Media related to NRHP listings in Jasper County
- List of National Historic Landmarks in South Carolina
- National Register of Historic Places listings in South Carolina
