= South Carolina Highway 336 =

State highway in South Carolina

South Carolina Highway 336

Route information
- Maintained by SCDOT
- Length: 13.590 mi (21.871 km)
- Existed: 1938–present

Major junctions
- West end: US 321 in Tillman
- US 17 / US 278 in Ridgeland; I-95 in Ridgeland
- East end: SC 462 in Old House

Location
- Country: United States
- State: South Carolina
- Counties: Jasper

Highway system
- South Carolina State Highway System; Interstate; US; State; Scenic
| ← SC 333 | → SC 340 |

South Carolina Highway 336 (SC 336) is a 13.590-mile (21.871 km) primary state highway in the U.S. state of South Carolina. It serves to connect Ridgeland with nearby U.S. Route 321 (US 321) and SC 462.

== Route description ==
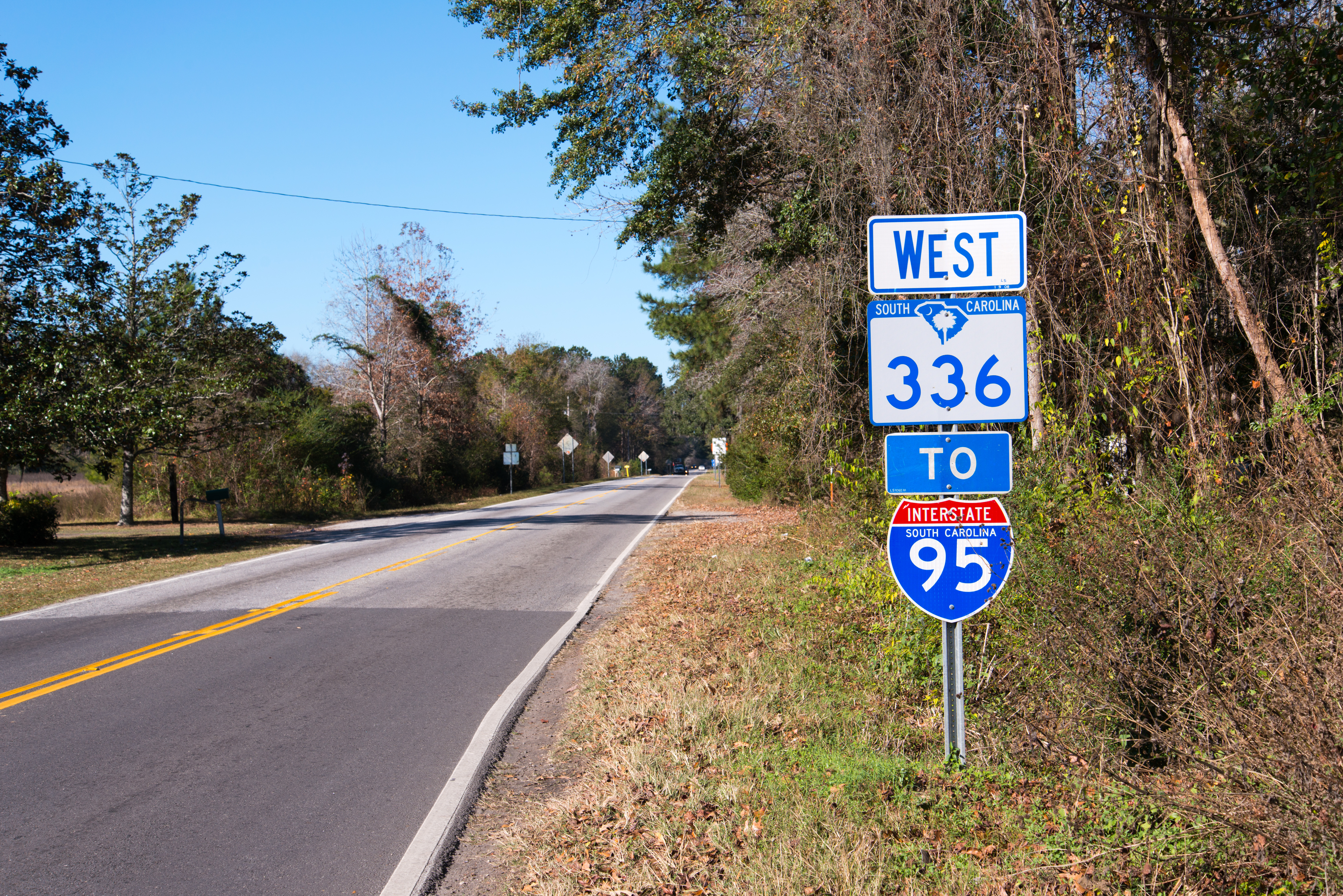
Westbound SC 336 along Old House Road in Old House

SC 336 is a two-lane rural highway predominantly throughout its route. Starting at US 321 in Tillman, it goes east into downtown Ridgeland, then continuing east to SC 462 in Old House where it ends. Its routing east of Interstate 95 (I-95) takes a series of turns, making the highway's routing a bit disjointing. Travelers wishing to bypass Ridgeland can continue straight on Smiths Crossing (S-27-29), saving a 0.5 miles (0.80 km) and a few minutes, though large trucks are restricted from using that route.

The highway connects to several historic places, including Jasper County Courthouse, Church of the Holy Trinity, Honey Hill-Boyd's Neck Battlefield, White Hall Plantation House Ruins and the Old House Plantation.

== History ==
The highway was established in 1938 as a new primary routing from SC 33 (today's US 321) in Tillman, to US 17/SC 36 (today's US 17/US 278) in Ridgeland. In 1997, it replaced US 278 from Ridgeland to SC 462 in Old House.

== Junction list ==
The entire route is in Jasper County.

| Location | mi | km | Destinations | Notes |
|---|---|---|---|---|
| Tillman | 0.000 | 0.000 | US 321 (Deerfield Road) – Estill, Hardeeville | Western terminus |
| Ridgeland | 7.520 | 12.102 | Russell Street north (SC 336 Conn. north) | Southern terminus of SC 336 Conn. and Russell Street |
| Ridgeland | 7.860 | 12.649 | US 17 / US 278 (Jacob Smart Boulevard) – Hardeeville, Hampton | |
| Ridgeland | 8.440 | 13.583 | I-95 – Savannah, Florence | I-95 exit 21 |
| Old House | 13.590 | 21.871 | SC 462 – Bluffton, Beaufort, Hilton Head Island, Coosawhatchie | Eastern terminus |
1.000 mi = 1.609 km; 1.000 km = 0.621 mi

== Ridgeland connector route ==
South Carolina Highway 336 Connector
- Location: Ridgeland
- Length: 0.150 mi (241 m)

South Carolina Highway 336 Connector (SC 336 Conn.) is a connector route that is in the western part of Ridgeland and in the northwestern part of Jasper County. It is known as Russell Street and is an unsigned highway.

The connector begins at an intersection with the SC 336 mainline (West Main Street). It travels to the north-northeast through a residential area of the city. At 3rd Avenue, it intersects U.S. Route 278 Connector (US 278 Conn.). Here, SC 336 Conn. ends, and US 278 Conn. utilizes the remainder of Russell Street.

The entire route is in Ridgeland, Jasper County.

| mi | km | Destinations | Notes |
|---|---|---|---|
| 0.000 | 0.000 | West Main Street (SC 336) | Southern terminus |
| 0.150 | 0.241 | Russell Street north (US 278 Conn. west); 3rd Avenue (US 278 Conn. east) | Northern terminus; US 278 Conn. west takes on the Russell Street name. |
1.000 mi = 1.609 km; 1.000 km = 0.621 mi
