= Old House, South Carolina =

- Unincorporated community
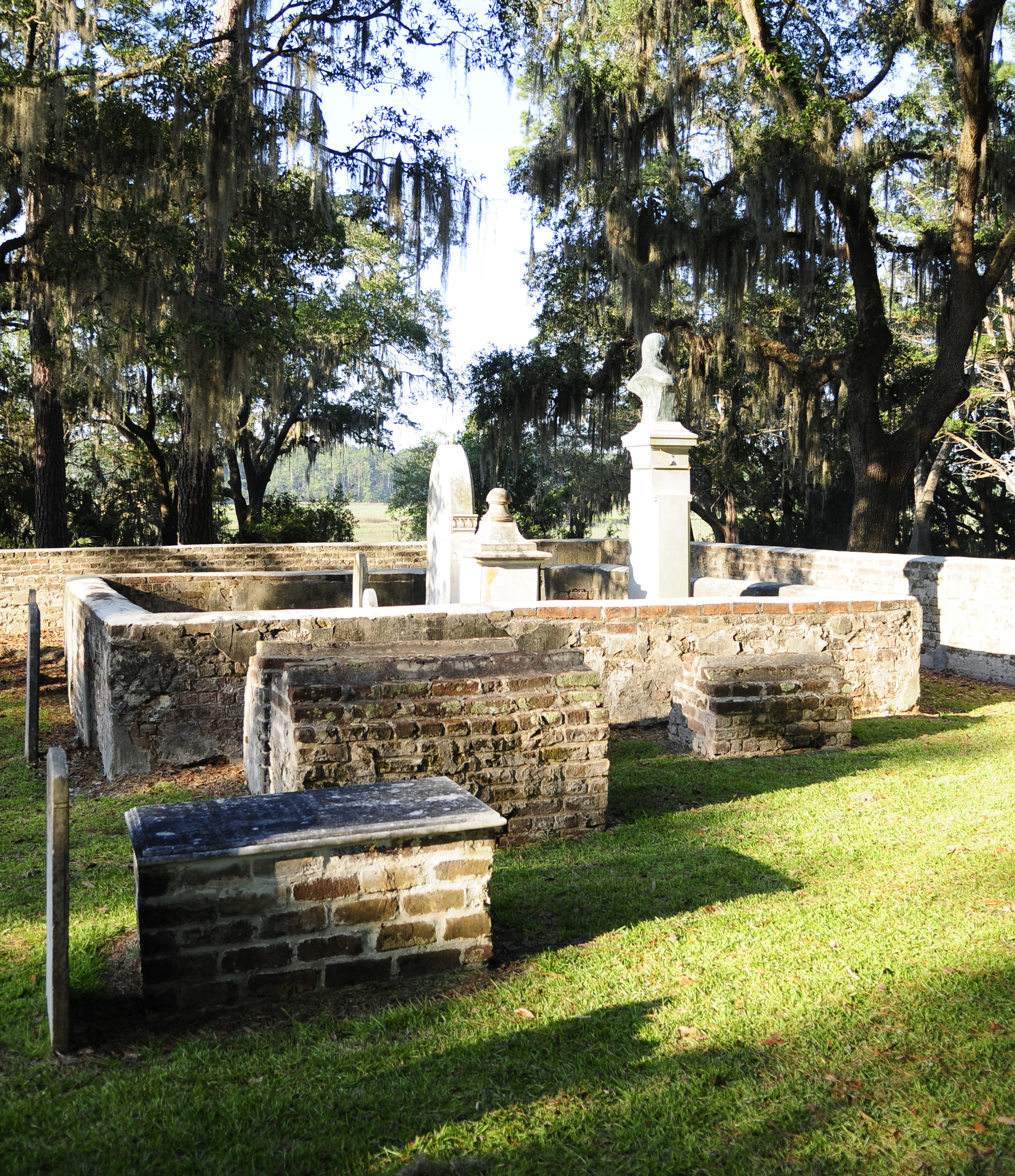
- Thomas Heyward, Jr. grave site, located at the Old House Plantation.

- Location within South Carolina Location within the United States
- Coordinates: 32°27′35″N 80°53′47″W
- Country: United States
- State: South Carolina
- County: Jasper County
- Elevation: 16 ft (5 m)
- Time zone: UTC-5 (Eastern (EST))
  - Summer (DST): UTC-4 (EDT)
- ZIP code: 29936
- Area codes: 843, 854
- GNIS feature ID: 1225189

Old House is an unincorporated community in Jasper County, South Carolina, United States. The community is located at the intersection of SC 336 and SC 462; 5 miles (8.0 km) east of Ridgeland.

The community is named after the Old House Plantation, which was settled 1740 by Daniel Heyward. The plantation included a tidal mill, textile factory and an import-export business, all of which were destroyed by fire in 1865. The site includes the grave of Thomas Heyward, Jr., a signer of the Declaration of Independence and of the Articles of Confederation as a representative of South Carolina.

== See also ==
- Broad River
- Honey Hill-Boyd's Neck Battlefield
- White Hall Plantation House Ruins
