= J.C. Richardson House =

Historic house in South Carolina, United States

- U.S. National Register of Historic Places
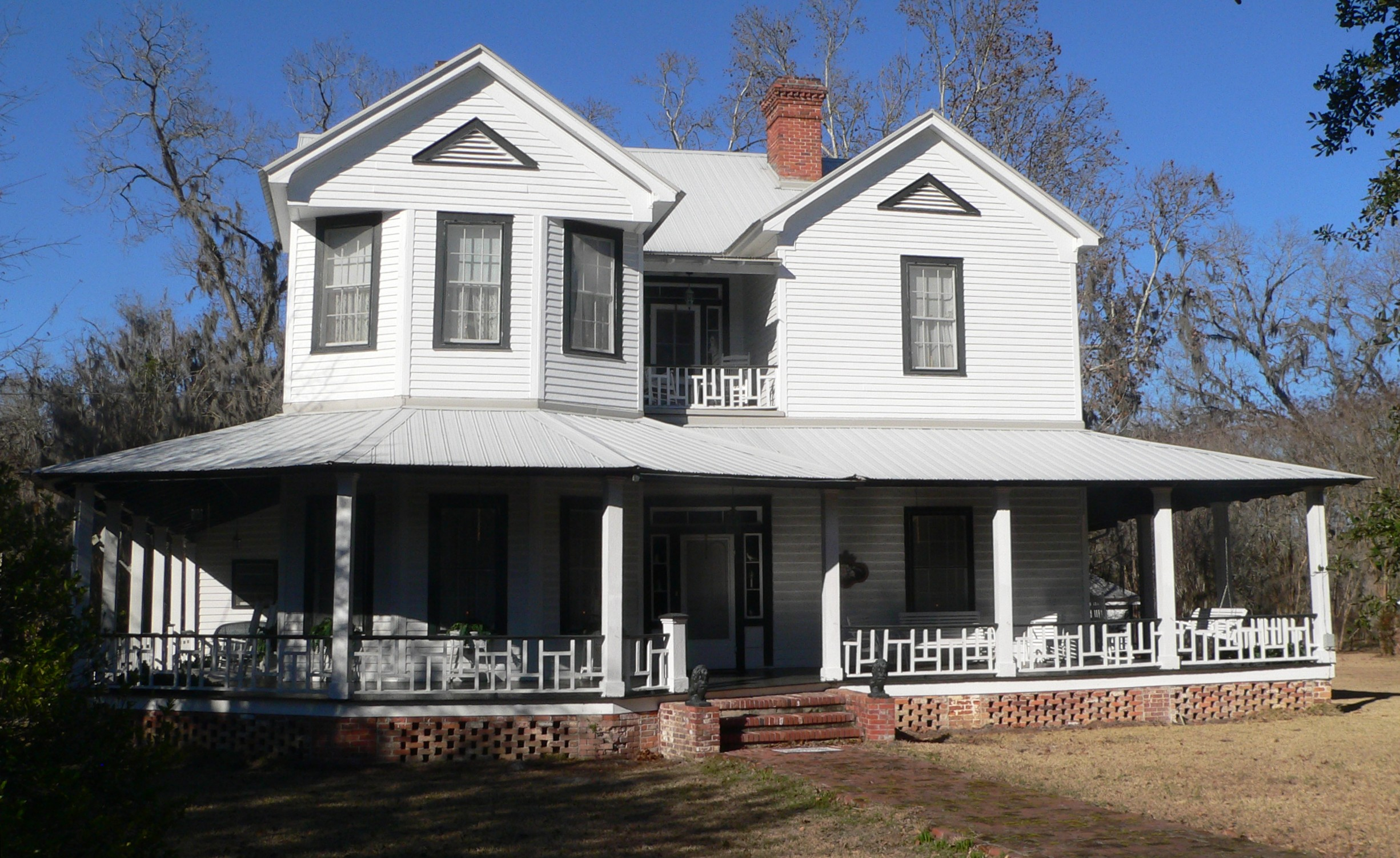

- Location within South Carolina Location within the United States
- Location: 67 Gillison Branch Rd., Robertville, South Carolina
- Coordinates: 32.58667°N 81.197406°W
- NRHP reference No.: 14000709
- Added to NRHP: September 22, 2014

The J.C. Richardson House is a historic house at 67 Gillison Branch Road in Robertville, South Carolina. It is a two-story wood-frame house, built c. 1880. It is an excellent local example of Folk Victorian style, with Chinese Chippendale details on the balustrades of its two-story porch, and Queen Anne elements including cutaway bay windows.

The house was listed on the National Register of Historic Places in 2014.

== See also ==
- National Register of Historic Places listings in Jasper County, South Carolina
