= Robertville Baptist Church =

Historic church in South Carolina, United States

- U.S. National Register of Historic Places
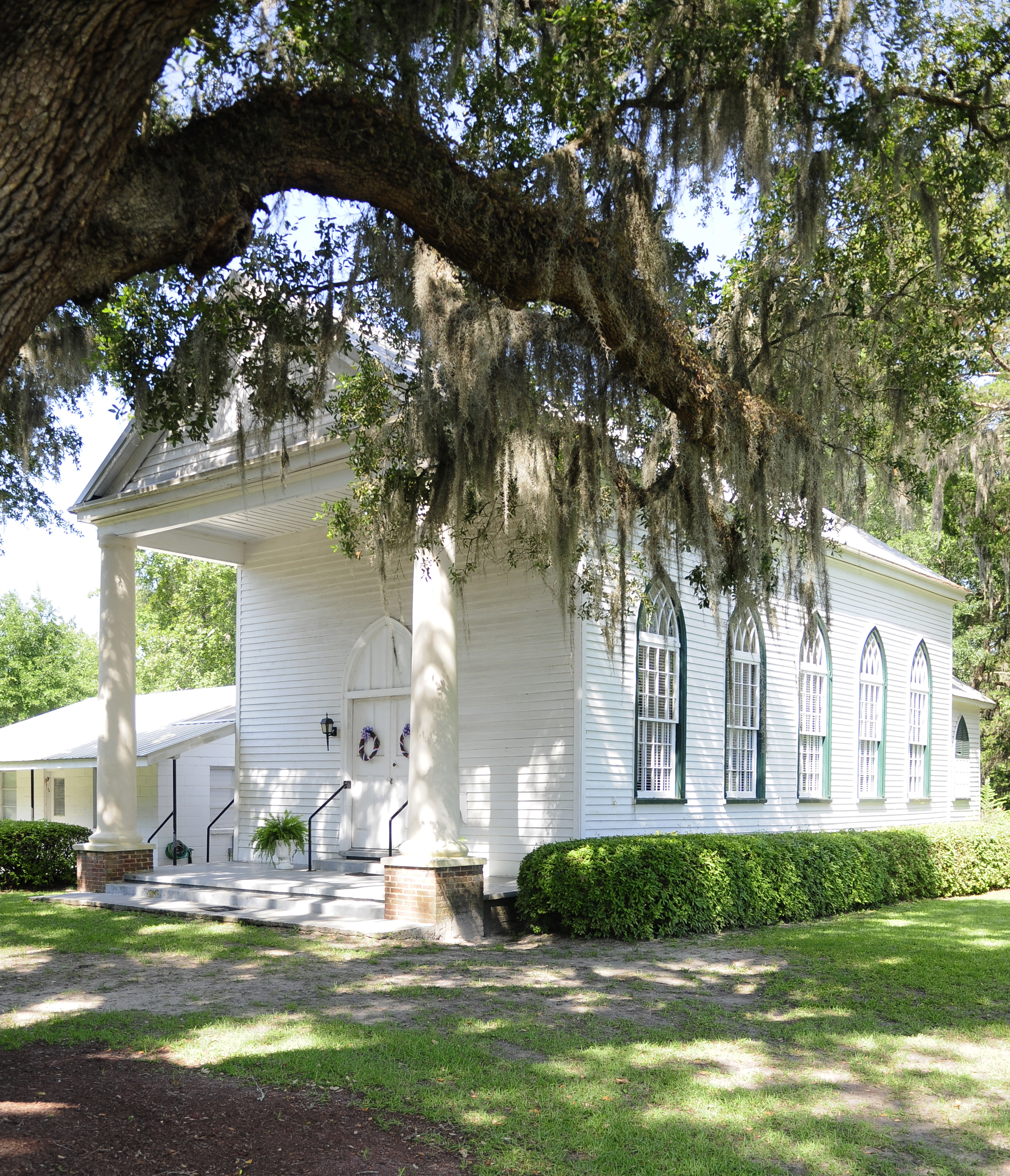
- Robertville Baptist Church, June 2012

- Location within South Carolina Location within the United States
- Location: Jct. of U.S. 321 and CR 26, Robertville, South Carolina
- Coordinates: 32°35′10″N 81°11′58″W
- Area: 2 acres (0.81 ha)
- Built: 1847
- Architectural style: Greek Revival
- NRHP reference No.: 72001213
- Added to NRHP: February 23, 1972

Robertville Baptist Church is a historic Southern Baptist church located at the junction of U.S. 321 and CR 26 (historic Sister's Ferry road) in Robertville, Jasper County, South Carolina. It was built about 1847, and is a one-story, small frame building with Greek Revival and Gothic Revival details. The portico is supported by two plain Doric order columns. The building was originally occupied by the Ascension Episcopal Church of Gillisonville, and purchased by Robertville Baptists and moved to its present location about 1867. Robertville Baptist Church was organized in 1781 and considered the "Mother of Churches" in the area.

It was added to the National Register of Historic Places in 1972.
