= Tillman School =

- U.S. National Register of Historic Places
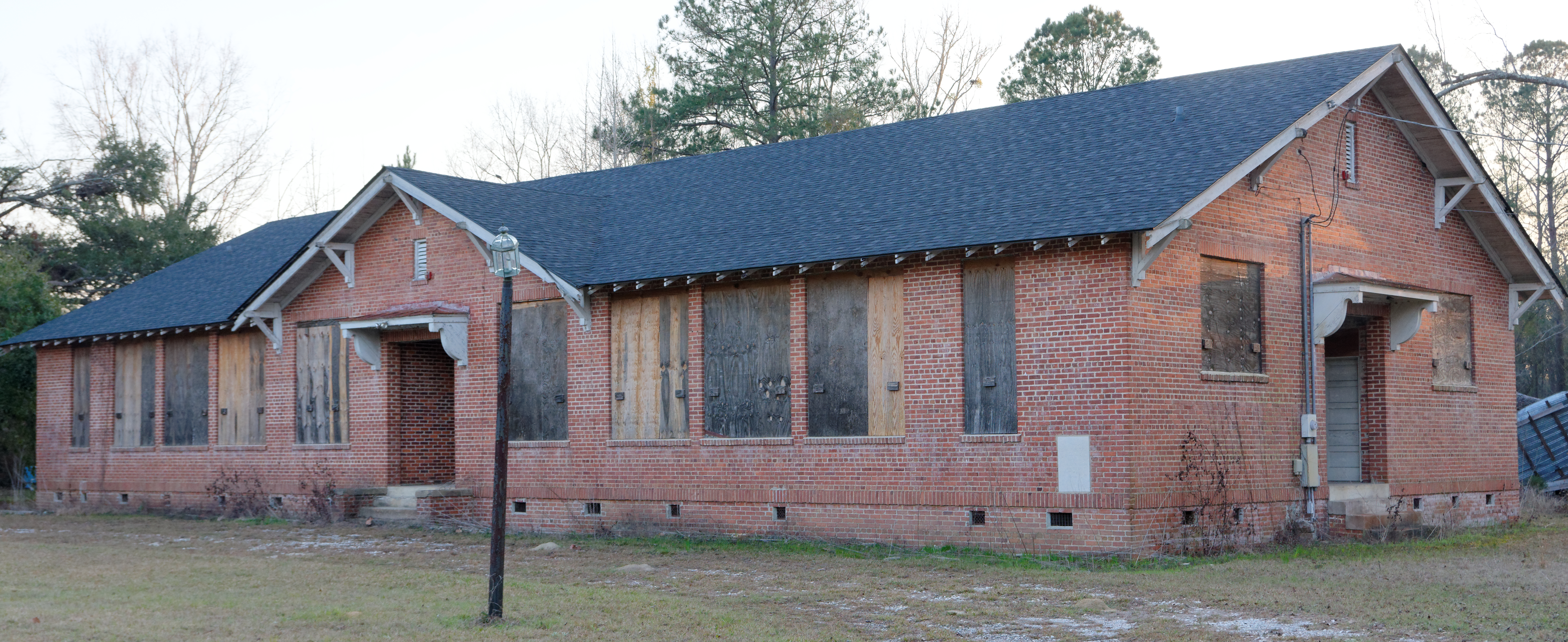
- Tillman School as seen in February 2017.

- Location within South Carolina Location within the United States
- Location: 191 Cotton Hill Rd., Tillman, South Carolina
- Coordinates: 32°27′57″N 81°6′33″W
- NRHP reference No.: 16000396
- Added to NRHP: June 21, 2016

The Tillman School is a historic school building at 191 Cotton Hill Road (United States Route 321) in Tillman, South Carolina. It is a single-story T-shaped brick building with Craftsman styling. Its roof has extended eaves with exposed rafter tails, and large knee brackets for support. The interior is little altered since its construction. The school was built in 1926-27 as part of a consolidation of local district schools. It was closed in 1963.

The building was listed on the National Register of Historic Places in 2016. Today it is owned by the Morris Center for Lowcountry Heritage.

== See also ==
- National Register of Historic Places listings in Jasper County, South Carolina
