= Sinclair Service Station (Ridgeland, South Carolina) =

Historic gas station in the US state of Georgia

- U.S. National Register of Historic Places
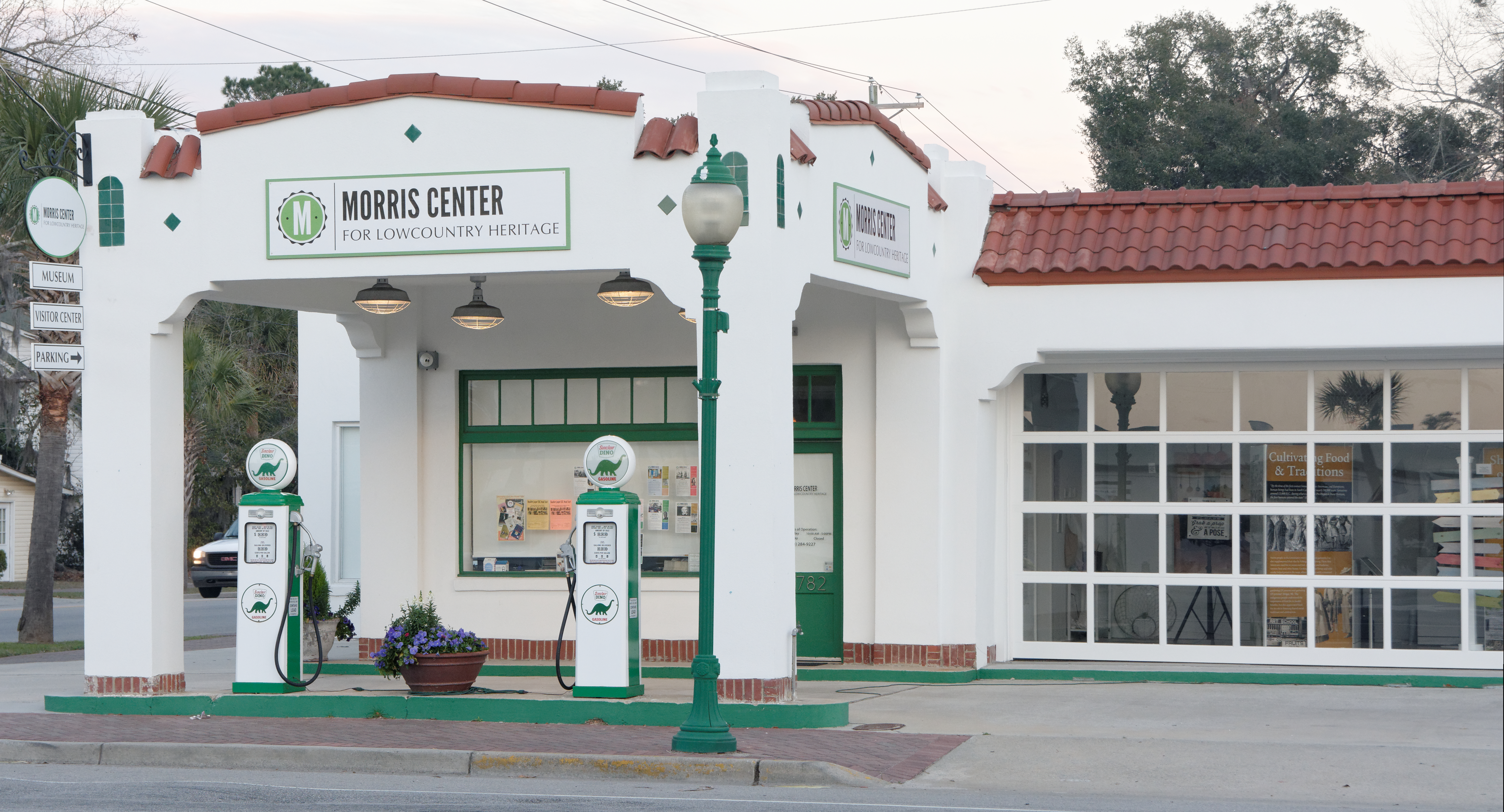

- Location within South Carolina Location within the United States
- Location: 10782 Jacob Smart Boulevard; Ridgeland, South Carolina; United States
- Coordinates: 32.48041°N 80.98024°W
- NRHP reference No.: 15000736
- Added to NRHP: October 13, 2015

The Sinclair Service Station is a historic automotive service station at 10782 Jacob Smart Boulevard (U.S. Route 17) in Ridgeland, South Carolina, United States.

== Description ==
The structure is a single-story T-shaped masonry building with modest Mediterranean Revival styling. A porte-cochère projects forward, across the area that originally housed gas pumps. It also contained an elongated single door two bay garage for the automotive repair shop. It was built in 1937 by the Sinclair Oil Corporation, along what was the major coastal route in South Carolina until the construction of Interstate 95. The station closed in 1978, and has since seen other commercial uses. It has been restored and now houses the Morris Center for Lowcountry Heritage. The building was listed on the National Register of Historic Places in 2015.

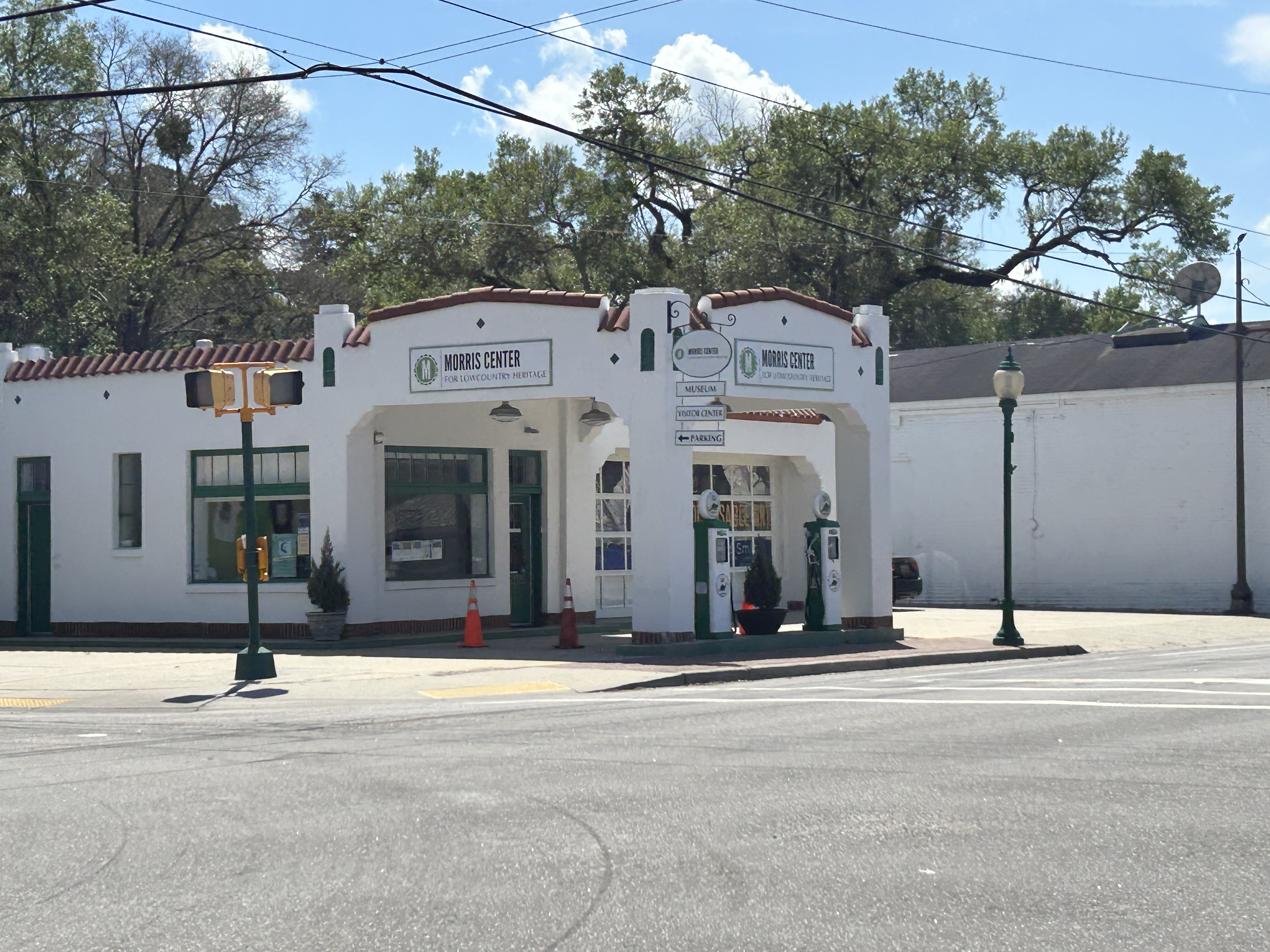
Another view of the station

== See also ==
- National Register of Historic Places listings in Jasper County, South Carolina
