= Sister's Ferry =

- Interactive map of Sister's Ferry
- 32°29′35.664″N 81°13′35.4″W
- Location: Tom Gothe Rd (SC State Road S-27-277) Near Clyo, Georgia Effingham County, Georgia / Jasper County, South Carolina

History
- Built: After 1820

Sisters Ferry is a historical site where the left wing of Union Maj. Gen. William Sherman's Army crossed the Savannah River during the beginning of General Sherman's "Carolina's Campaign" near the end of the American Civil War.

== History ==
Sister's Ferry is a ferry crossing the Savannah River established sometime after 1820. The site is approximately 2 miles downstream of an older ferry-crossing site, Two Sister's Ferry, where loyalists in the Southern Campaign of the American Revolutionary War crossed the Savannah River on March 12, 1780. It is approximately 35 miles upstream from the City of Savannah.

== Sherman's Army Crossing ==
After Sherman captured Savannah, the culmination of his march to the sea, he was ordered by Union Army general-in-chief Lt. Gen. Ulysses S. Grant to embark his army on ships to reinforce the Army of the Potomac and the Army of the James in Virginia, where Grant was bogged down in the Siege of Petersburg against Confederate General Robert E. Lee. However, he persuaded Grant that he should march north through the Carolinas instead, destroying everything of military value along the way, similar to his march to the sea through Georgia. Sherman was particularly interested in targeting South Carolina, the first state to secede from the Union, for the effect it would have on Southern morale.

General Sherman gave orders on January 19, 1865 to Maj. Gen. Henry W. Slocum, commander of the XIV and XX Corps, to cross the Savannah River into South Carolina at Sisters Ferry and Pocotaligo. At first, General Solcum was delayed by heavy rainfall; the wing was not able to leave the city of Savannah until January 29, 1865. By February 2, Slocum's wing still struggled to cross at the ferry point and lagged behind the rest of Sherman's Army in entering South Carolina.

Once they crossed the river, the wing proceeded up Sisters Ferry Road towards the town of Robertville, SC.
