= Grays Consolidated High School =

- Formerly listed on the U.S. National Register of Historic Places
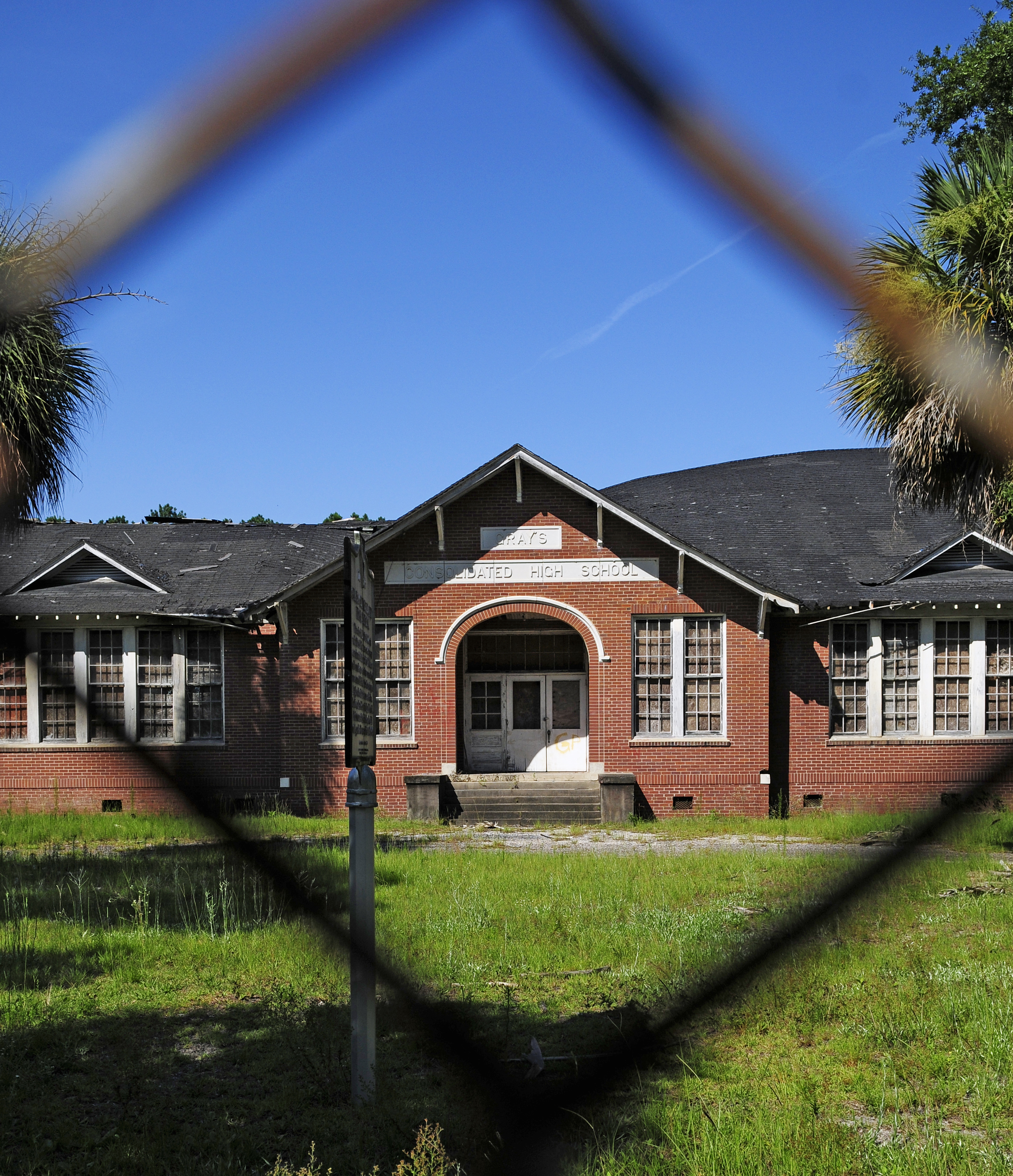
- Grays Consolidated High School, June 2012

- Location within South Carolina Location within the United States
- Location: US 278, Grays, South Carolina
- Coordinates: 32°40′27″N 81°01′17″W
- Area: less than one acre
- Built: 1931
- Architect: Sames, James Hagood; Knopf, J.J.
- Architectural style: Late 19th And Early 20th Century American Movements
- NRHP reference No.: 07000986

Significant dates
- Added to NRHP: September 21, 2007
- Removed from NRHP: August 9, 2016

Grays Consolidated High School was a historic high school located at Grays, Jasper County, South Carolina. It was built in 1927 and rebuilt in 1931. It consisted of three projecting pavilions, with the central pavilion featuring decorative rafter tails, knee braces, and a two-part limestone inlaid plaque. Flanking this were projecting pavilions with hipped roofs. In 1931, the building was expanded with a large classroom wing extension and rear ell. Also on the property is a contributing outbuilding - a brick boiler room/storage room.

The building was added to the National Register of Historic Places in 2007. The school was demolished in March 2013, and was removed from the National Register in 2016.
