= Tillman, South Carolina =

- Unincorporated community
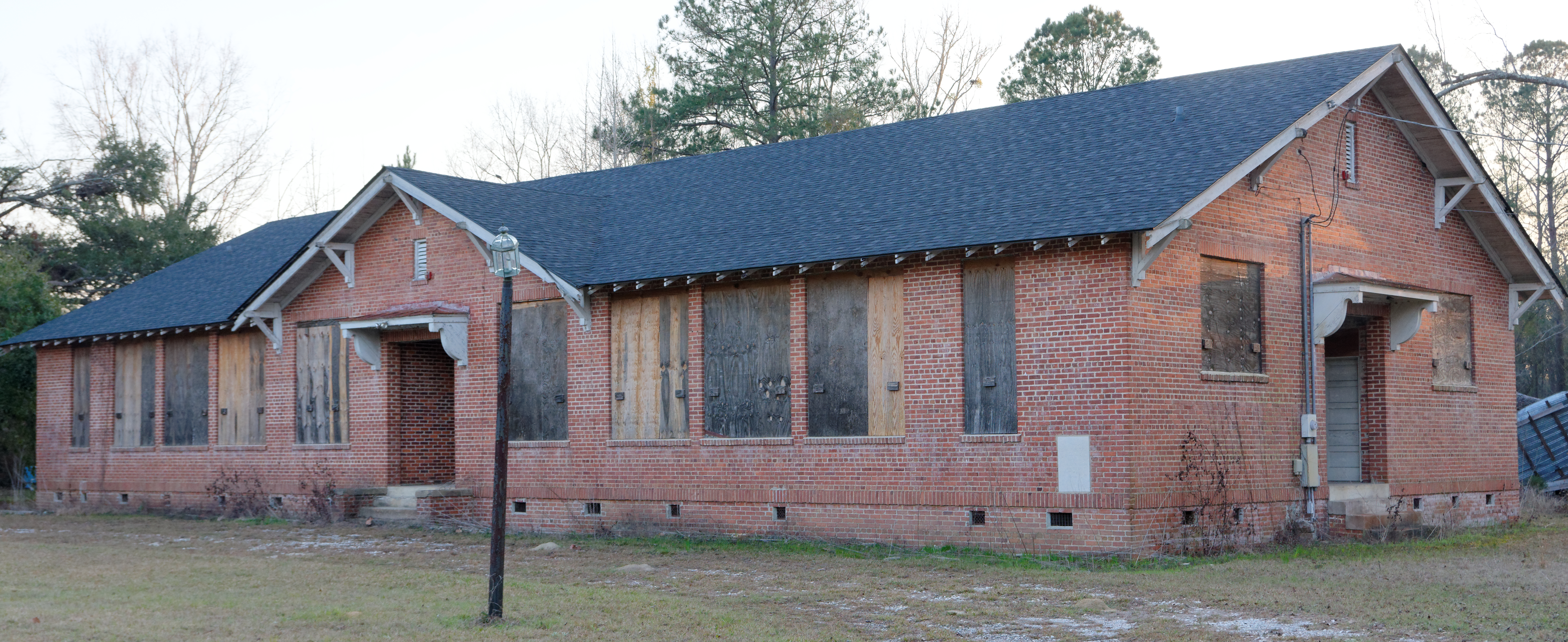
- Tillman School

- Location within South Carolina Location within the United States
- Coordinates: 32°27′49″N 81°06′26″W
- Country: United States
- State: South Carolina
- County: Jasper
- Elevation: 56 ft (17 m)
- Time zone: UTC-5 (Eastern (EST))
  - Summer (DST): UTC-4 (EDT)
- ZIP code: 29943
- Area codes: 843 & 854
- GNIS feature ID: 1251172

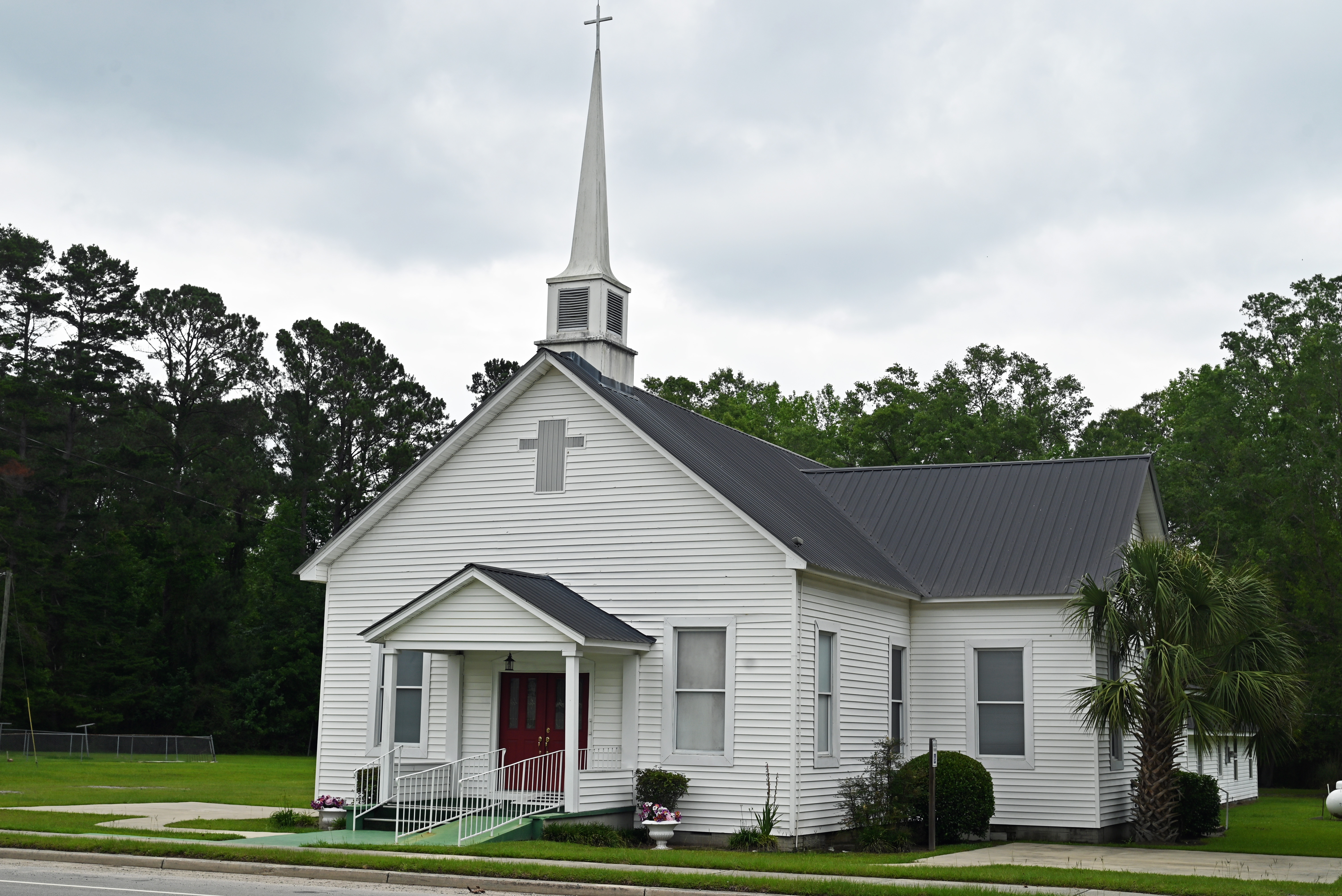
Historic Baptist Church

Tillman is an unincorporated community in Jasper County, South Carolina, United States. The community is located at the intersection of U.S. Route 321 and South Carolina Highway 336, 7.5 miles (12.1 km) west of Ridgeland. Tillman has a post office with ZIP code 29943, which opened on August 2, 1880.

Tillman School, which is listed on the National Register of Historic Places, is located in Tillman.
