= Church of the Holy Trinity (Ridgeland, South Carolina) =

Historic church in South Carolina, United States

- U.S. National Register of Historic Places
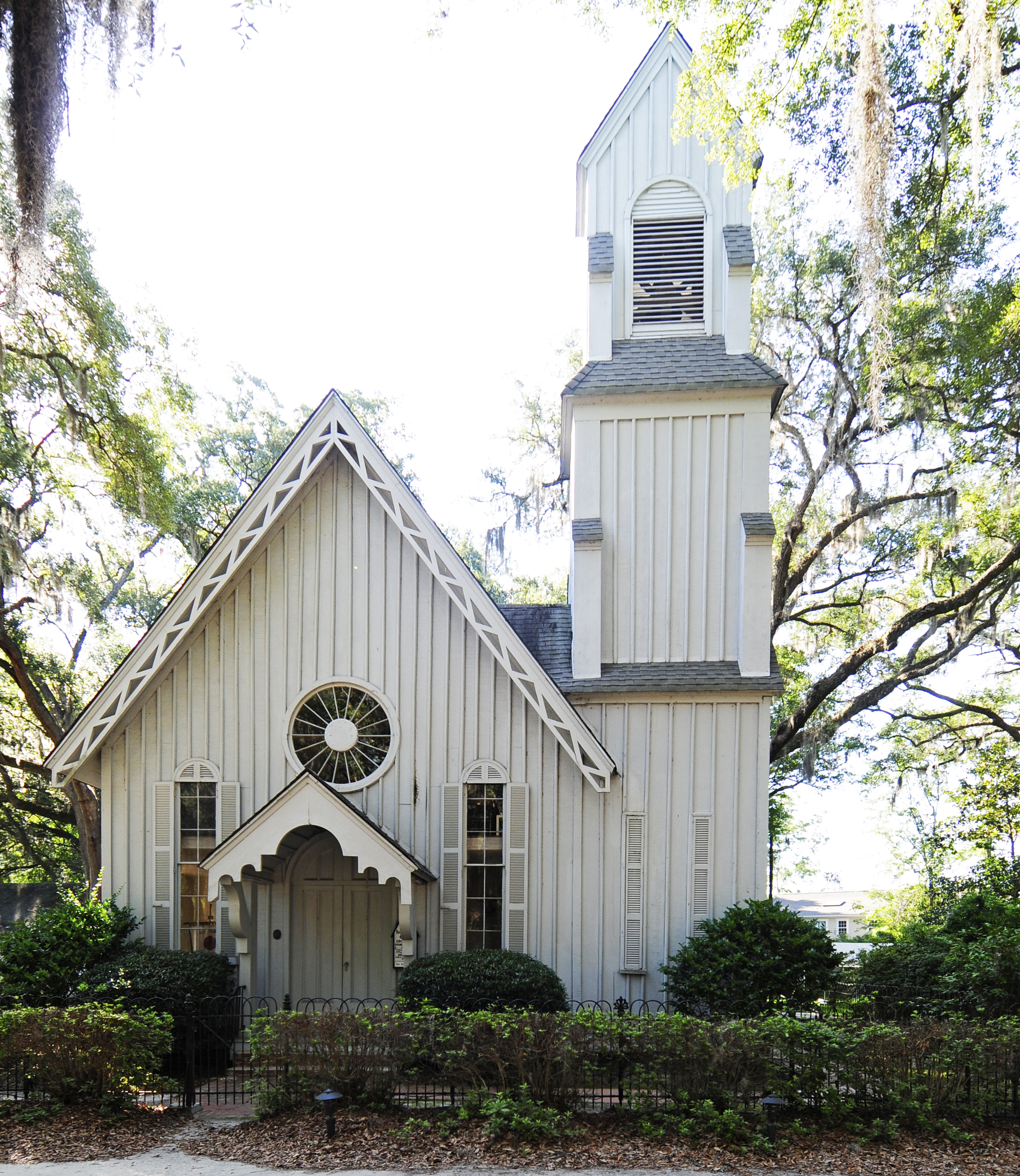

- Location within South Carolina Location within the United States
- Location: South Carolina Highways 13 and 29, near Ridgeland, South Carolina
- Coordinates: 32°28′12″N 80°57′55″W
- Area: 2.2 acres (0.89 ha)
- Built: 1858
- Architectural style: Gothic Revival, Carpenter Gothic
- NRHP reference No.: 82003869
- Added to NRHP: March 25, 1982

The Church of the Holy Trinity is a historic Anglican church located in the community of Grahamville, near Ridgeland, in Jasper County, South Carolina, United States. Built circa 1858 in the Carpenter Gothic style, it is the third building associated with an Episcopal congregation established in the early nineteenth century by Lowcountry planters. The church is the sole surviving structure from the antebellum village of Grahamville, which was burned by Union troops in 1864 during the Civil War. It was added to the National Register of Historic Places on March 25, 1982.

== History ==
=== Early congregation and predecessor buildings ===
The congregation traces its origins to 1824, when Grahamville was developing as a summer retreat village for rice planters of upper St. Luke's Parish in the Beaufort District. Planters from prominent Lowcountry families, including the Heywards, Bolans, and Screvens, built summer cottages on higher ground at Grahamville to escape the malaria-prone coastal lowlands during the warmer months. The congregation's first sanctuary, called Union Chapel, served as a chapel of ease for planters who wished to worship in Grahamville rather than travel to the parish church near the Beaufort County line.

As the community grew, a second, larger sanctuary known as the Chapel of the Holy Trinity replaced Union Chapel around 1830. In 1829, William Heyward had donated land at the crossroads in Grahamville for the construction of this Episcopal chapel. The congregation became independent of St. Luke's Parish Church in 1834 and was established as a separate parish in 1835.

=== Construction of the present church ===
By the mid-1850s the congregation had outgrown the 1830 chapel. James Bolan, a planter and owner of Bolan Hall Plantation, provided most of the funds for the construction of a new and larger sanctuary. The present church was completed circa 1858. The Reverend Arthur Wigfall served as rector during the 1850s and in 1856 delivered a widely praised sermon titled "A Sermon Upon Duelling." The sermon was so well received that the congregation subsequently formed the Grahamville Association for the Suppression of Duelling, which met biannually in the church.

=== Civil War and aftermath ===
During the Civil War, most of the buildings in Grahamville were burned by Union troops in 1864. The church, however, was spared because it was used as a headquarters for Union forces. Despite its survival, the interior was ransacked and its possessions pillaged during the occupation. The church Bible, believed to have been stolen during the war, was returned in 1928 after a New York music publisher discovered it in an attic. The endsheet of the Bible bears the scribbled name of a Union officer.

As a result of the destruction, the Church of the Holy Trinity is the only building remaining from the old village of Grahamville.

=== Denominational history ===
The church was historically part of the Episcopal Diocese of South Carolina. In 2012, it was among the majority of congregations in the diocese that voted to disaffiliate from the Episcopal Church during the Anglican realignment. The congregation joined the Anglican Diocese of South Carolina, which became part of the Anglican Church in North America in 2017.

== Architecture ==
The Church of the Holy Trinity is architecturally significant as a notable example of the Carpenter Gothic style, in which the masonry designs of English Gothic Revival architecture were translated into wooden construction. The wood-frame building features vertical board and batten siding and a steeply pitched gable roof. A buttressed bell tower rises from the south side of the structure. The gable overhang and small porch have decorative bargeboards with differing patterns. The double entrance door is round-headed, as are the windows, which use the earlier round-arch form of the Gothic style rather than the later pointed arch. A large multi-paned circular wheel window is centered in the facade.

The three-staged bell tower has an exterior entrance to a stairway that leads to a gallery, which originally served as the slave gallery and now houses a pipe organ. The interior is noted for its hammer-beam timber ceiling and its nineteenth-century yellow pine furnishings.

== Setting ==
The church stands on a 2.2 acres (0.89 ha) lot at the intersection of South Carolina Secondary Roads 13 and 29 in Grahamville. It is set in a grove of large live oaks, which were planted in the nineteenth century by the women of the congregation. These trees contribute significantly to the visual character of the site.

== See also ==
- National Register of Historic Places listings in Jasper County, South Carolina
- Grahamville, South Carolina
- Anglican Diocese of South Carolina
- Battle of Honey Hill
