= Robertville, South Carolina =

Unincorporated community in South Carolina, US

Coordinates: 32°25′40″N 81°00′31″W

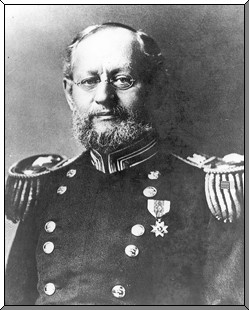
Henry Martyn Robert

Robertville is an unincorporated community in Jasper County, South Carolina, United States. It is named after the Robert family who initially settled in the area and was also the birthplace of Henry Martyn Robert, founder of Robert's Rules of Order. The community is accessible via U.S. Highway 321 and is located about halfway between Hardeeville and Estill. It is also located on the historic Sister's Ferry road where the left wing of General William Sherman's army marched through and torched the town in the "Carolinas campaign."

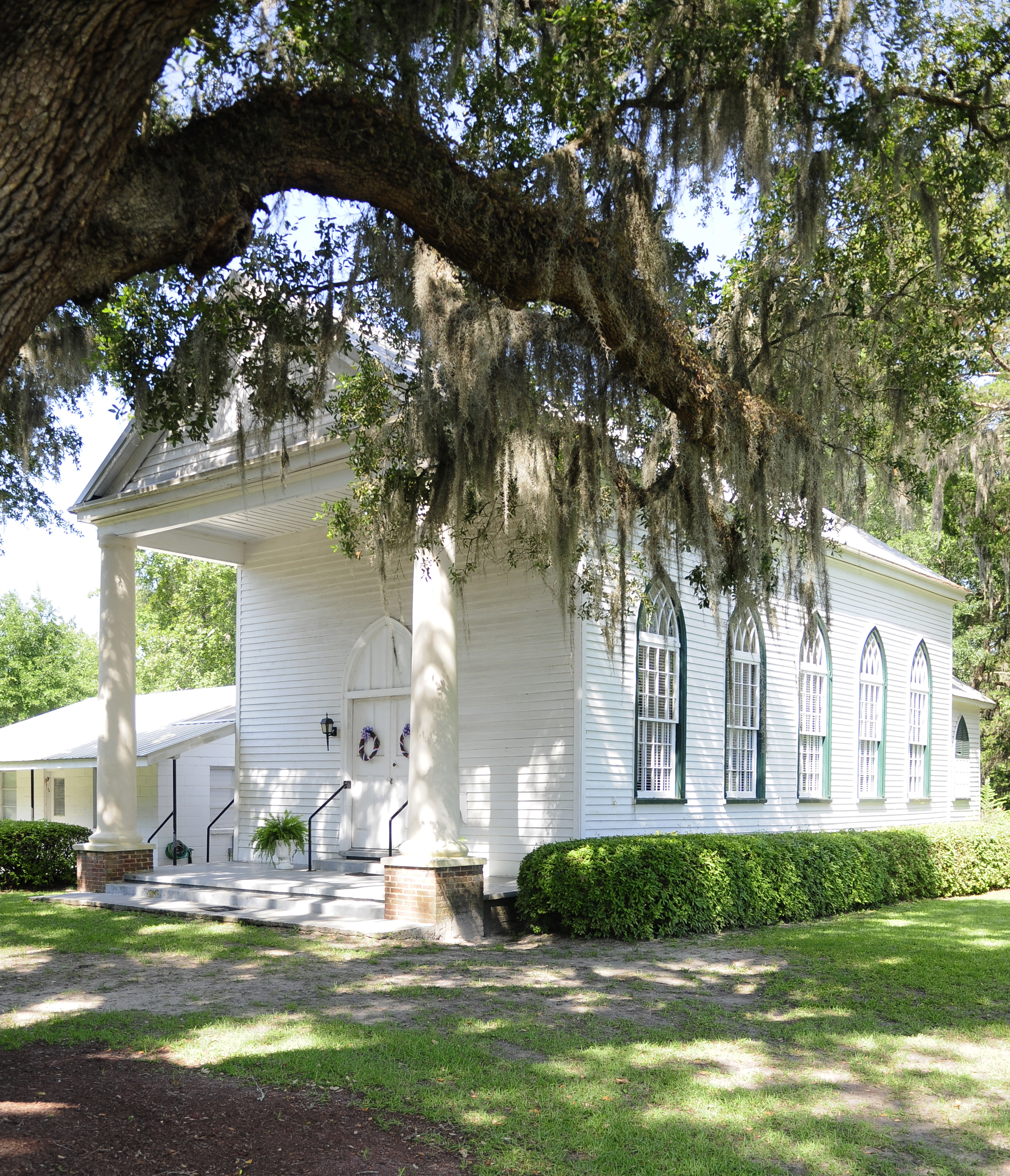
Robertville Baptist Church

Notable buildings include the Robertville Baptist Church, which is on the National Register of Historic Places, Pleasant Hill Plantation, and the ruins of Black Swamp Plantation.
