= Honey Hill-Boyd's Neck Battlefield =

Battlefield in South Carolina, United States

- U.S. National Register of Historic Places
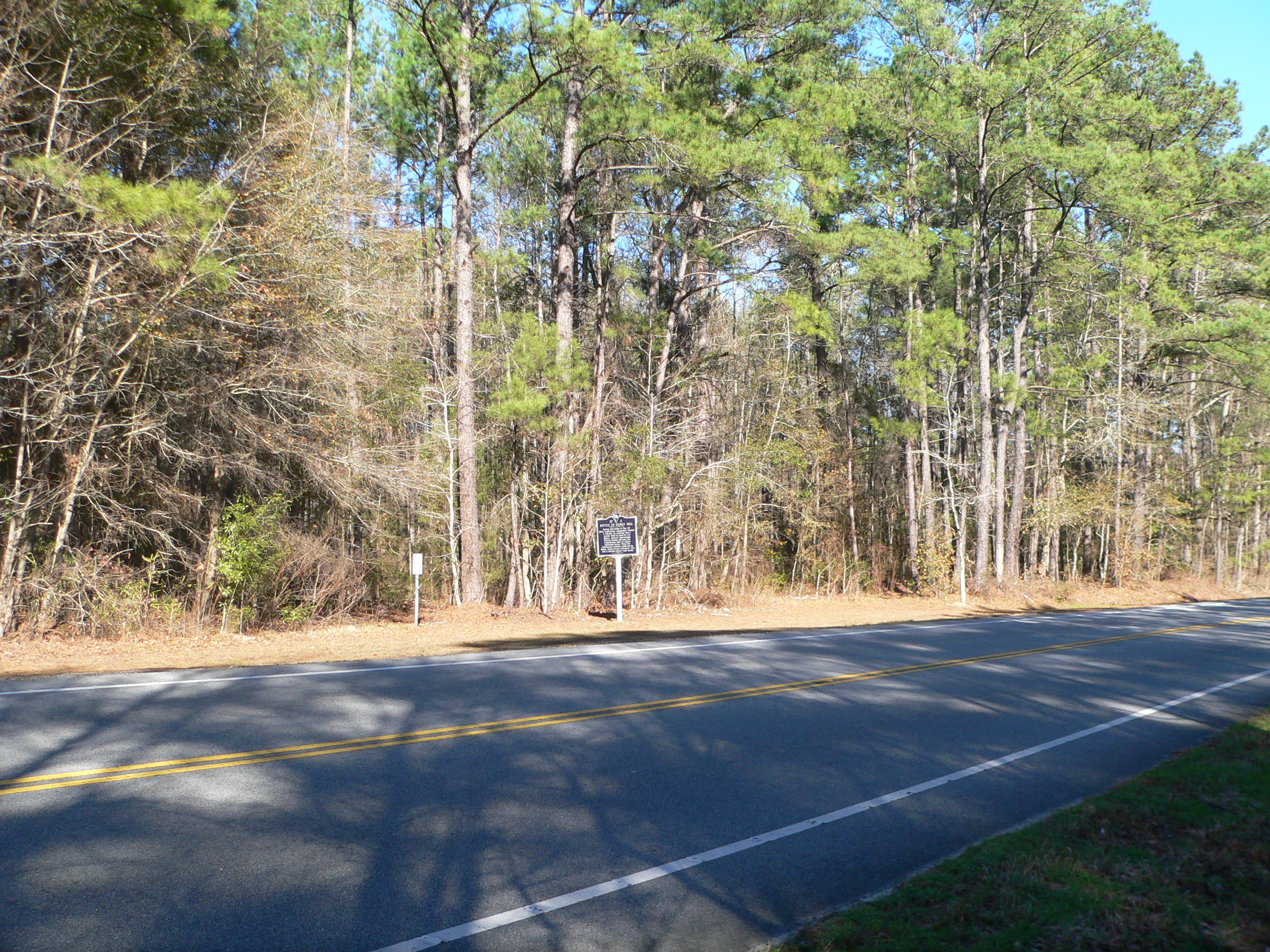
- A marker beside South Carolina Highway 336 commemorates the Battle of Honey Hill

- Location within South Carolina
- Nearest city: Atop and east of Honey Hill, east of Ridgeland, near Ridgeland, South Carolina
- Coordinates: 32°28′56″N 80°56′4″W
- Area: 5,629.5 acres (2,278.2 ha)
- Built: 1864
- NRHP reference No.: 04000655
- Added to NRHP: July 3, 2004

Honey Hill-Boyd's Neck Battlefield is a battlefield in Jasper County, South Carolina.

== Description and administrative history ==
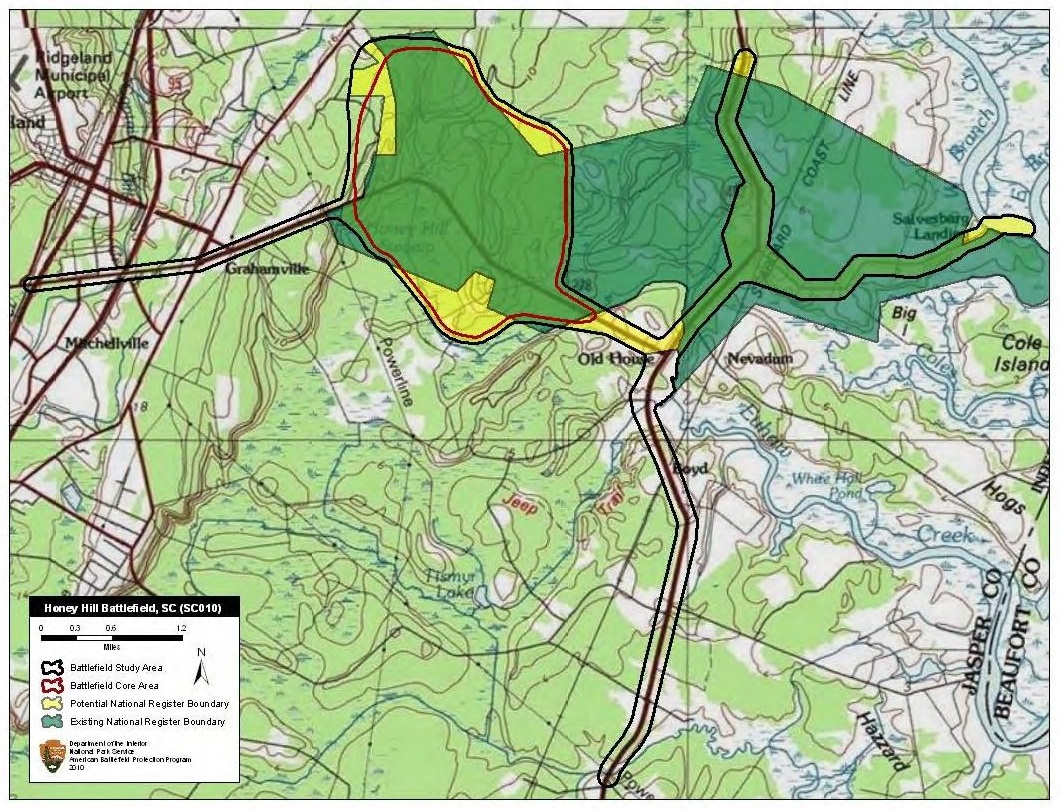
Battlefield core and study areas by the American Battlefield Protection Program

The boundary encompasses the site of the Battle of Honey Hill, November 30, 1864, as well as the Federal enclave on Boyd's Neck and other related areas of the Honey Hill campaign, November 29, 1864 to January 11, 1865.

The Battle of Honey Hill was one of the three largest Civil War encounters fought in South Carolina and was one of the most notable Civil War engagements involving African and American troops. The site includes the largely intact 1864 road network and extensive Civil War earthworks.

It was added to the National Register of Historic Places in 2004.
