= White Hall Plantation House Ruins and Oak Avenue =

Archaeological site in South Carolina, United States

- U.S. National Register of Historic Places
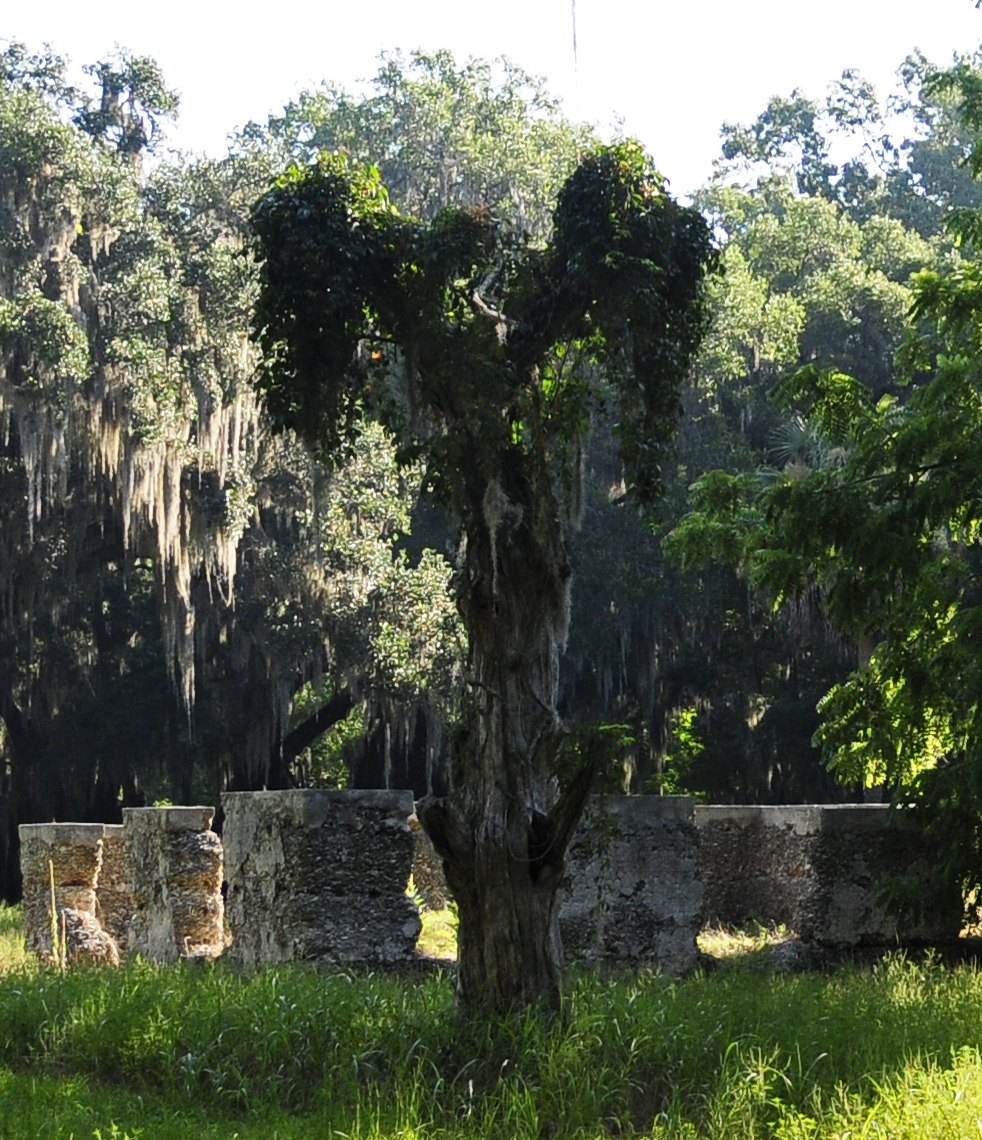
- White Hall Plantation Ruins, June 2012

- Location within South Carolina Location within the United States
- Location: Off South Carolina Highway 336, west of Old House, near Ridgeland, South Carolina
- Coordinates: 32°28′07″N 80°55′28″W
- Area: 25 acres (10 ha)
- Built: 1786
- Architectural style: Colonial, Early Republic
- NRHP reference No.: 98000423
- Added to NRHP: October 27, 2000

White Hall Plantation House Ruins and Oak Avenue is a historic plantation site located near Ridgeland, Jasper County, South Carolina. The site consists of the ruins of a brick house with tabby wings and twin tabby flanking outbuildings; a tabby retaining wall; and a massive double avenue of oaks planted in the late-18th or early-19th century. The plantation house was built between 1771 and 1776, then enlarged between 1786 and 1791. The house at White Hall burned about 1870 and was not renovated or occupied afterward.

It was added to the National Register of Historic Places in 2000.
