= Old House Plantation =

Archaeological site in South Carolina, United States

- U.S. National Register of Historic Places
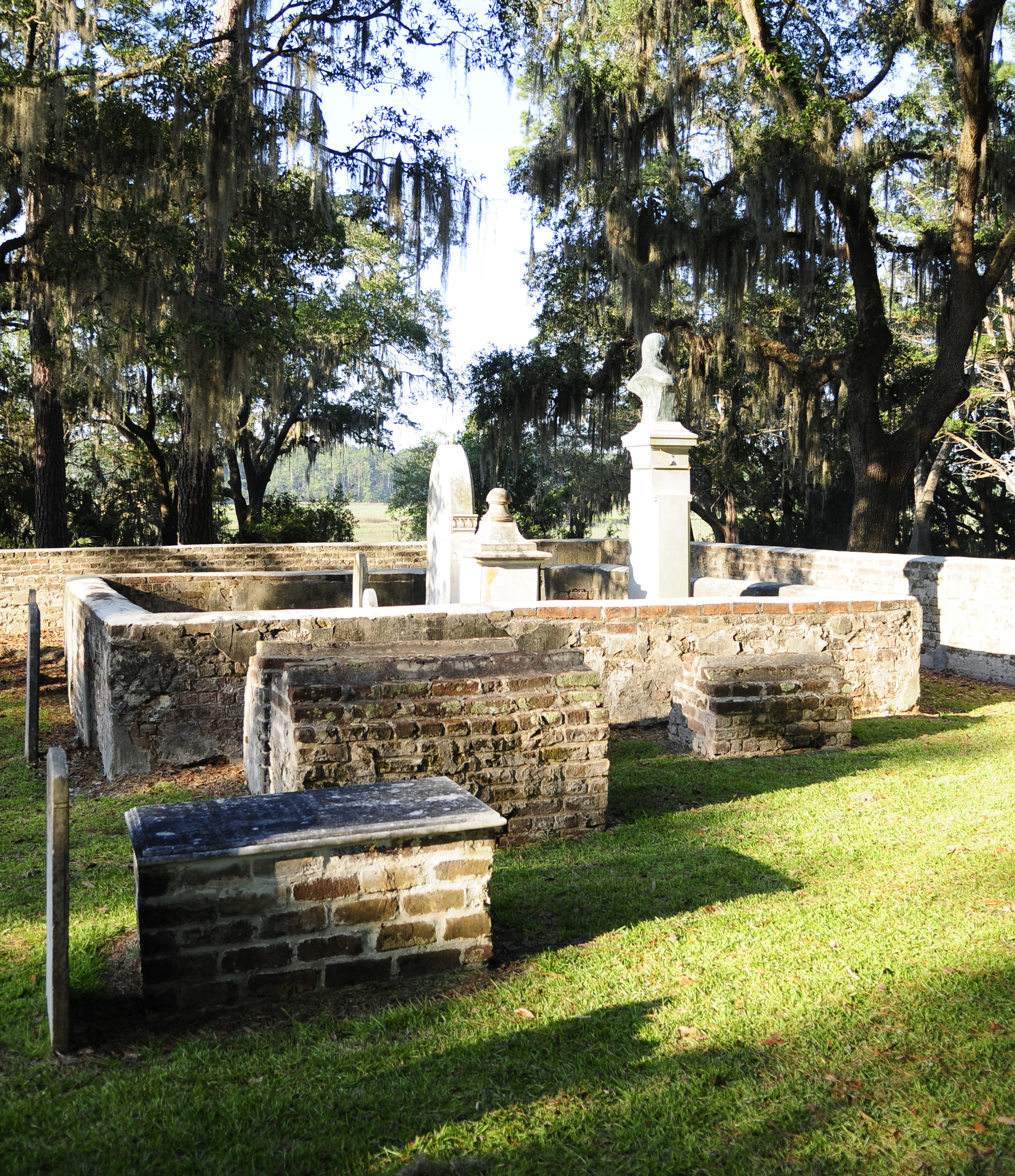
- Old House Plantation, June 2012

- Location within South Carolina Location within the United States
- Location: Off South Carolina Highway 462, just south of Old House, near Ridgeland, South Carolina
- Coordinates: 32°27′28″N 80°53′52″W
- Area: 13.4 acres (5.4 ha)
- NRHP reference No.: 97001159
- Added to NRHP: October 6, 1997

Old House Plantation, also known as Daniel Heyward Plantation, is a historic plantation site and grave located near Ridgeland, Jasper County, South Carolina. The plantation was first settled in 1743 and was likely active through the first quarter of the 19th century. It was the birthplace and burial site of Founding Father Thomas Heyward, Jr., one of South Carolina's four signers of the Declaration of Independence. The plantation site includes a variety of plantation structures including the main house, two probable flanking outbuildings (one of which is likely a kitchen), a tidal mill, stable and likely slave quarters. The original 500-acre plantation grew to 16,000 acres, but it was destroyed by fire in 1865. Associated with the plantation is the Heyward family cemetery and surrounding brick wall.

It was added to the National Register of Historic Places in 1997.
