= Jackson Street Freedman's Cottages =

Historic house in South Carolina, US

- U.S. National Register of Historic Places
- Location within South Carolina Location within the United States
- Location: 193-199 Jackson St., Charleston, South Carolina
- Coordinates: 32°47′57″N 79°56′29″W
- Built: c. 1890
- NRHP reference No.: 100001037
- Added to NRHP: June 5, 2017

The Jackson Street Freedman's Cottages are four small worker housing units at 193–199 Jackson Street in Charleston, South Carolina. They are simple frame structures with gabled roofs and front piazzas, built in the 1890s to meet demand for worker housing. The stylistic appellation "freedman's cottage" is based on the incorrect belief that these types of houses were originally commonly built for recently emancipated African Americans after the American Civil War. "Charleston cottage" is used to refer to the house.

These four cottages were recently rehabilitated by Cameron Glaws of Brown-Glaws Contractors. The renovation of the Jackson Street Freedman's Cottages started in April 2018 and was completed in December 2018. The buildings were rehabilitated according to the Secretary of the Interior's Standards for the Treatment of Historic Properties. The rehabilitation of these historic buildings included the use of State and Federal Historic Tax Credits.

The cottages were listed on the National Register of Historic Places in 2017.

== Gallery ==
Before being restored, the Jackson Street cottages were in a state of serious disrepair.

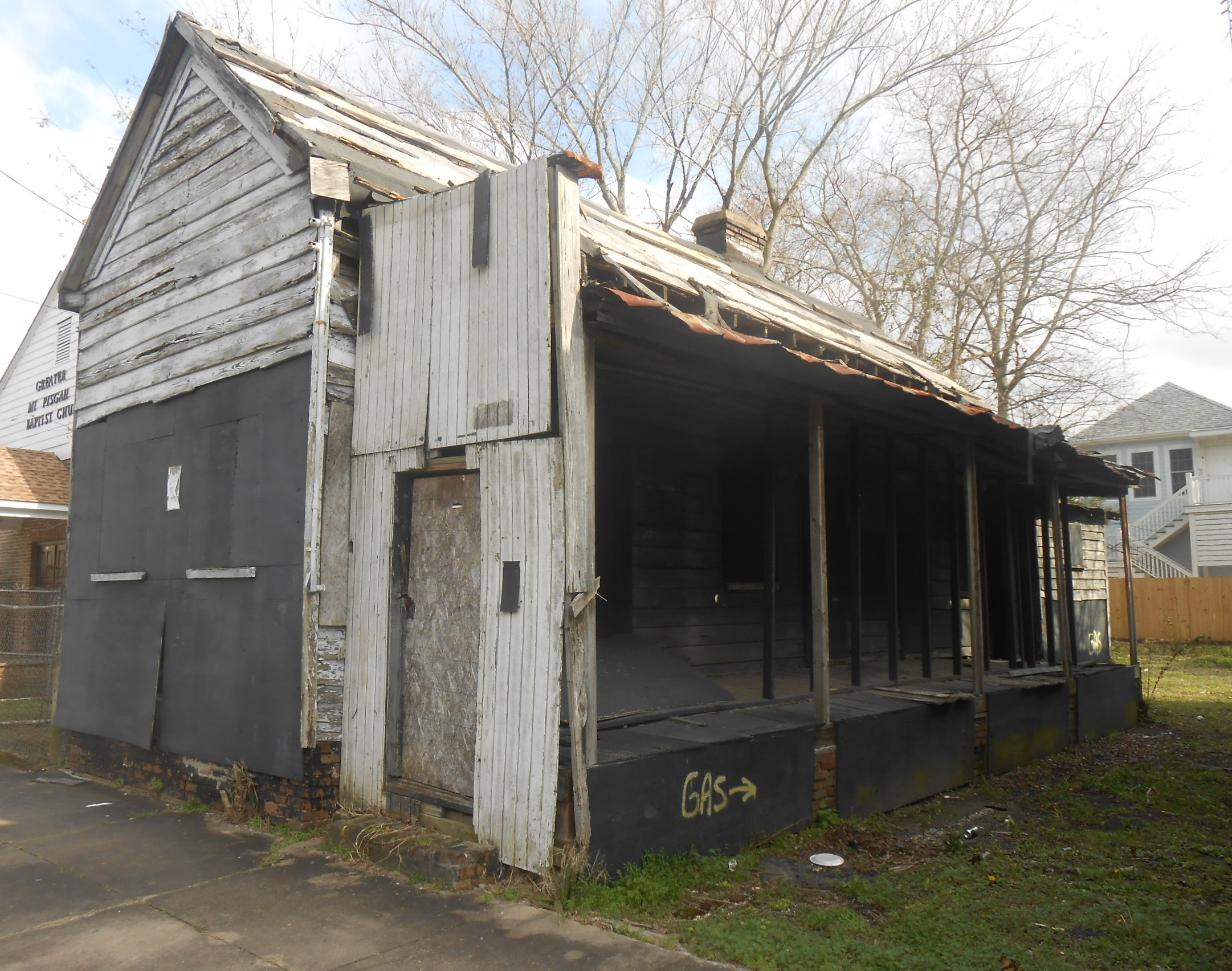
193 Jackson Street

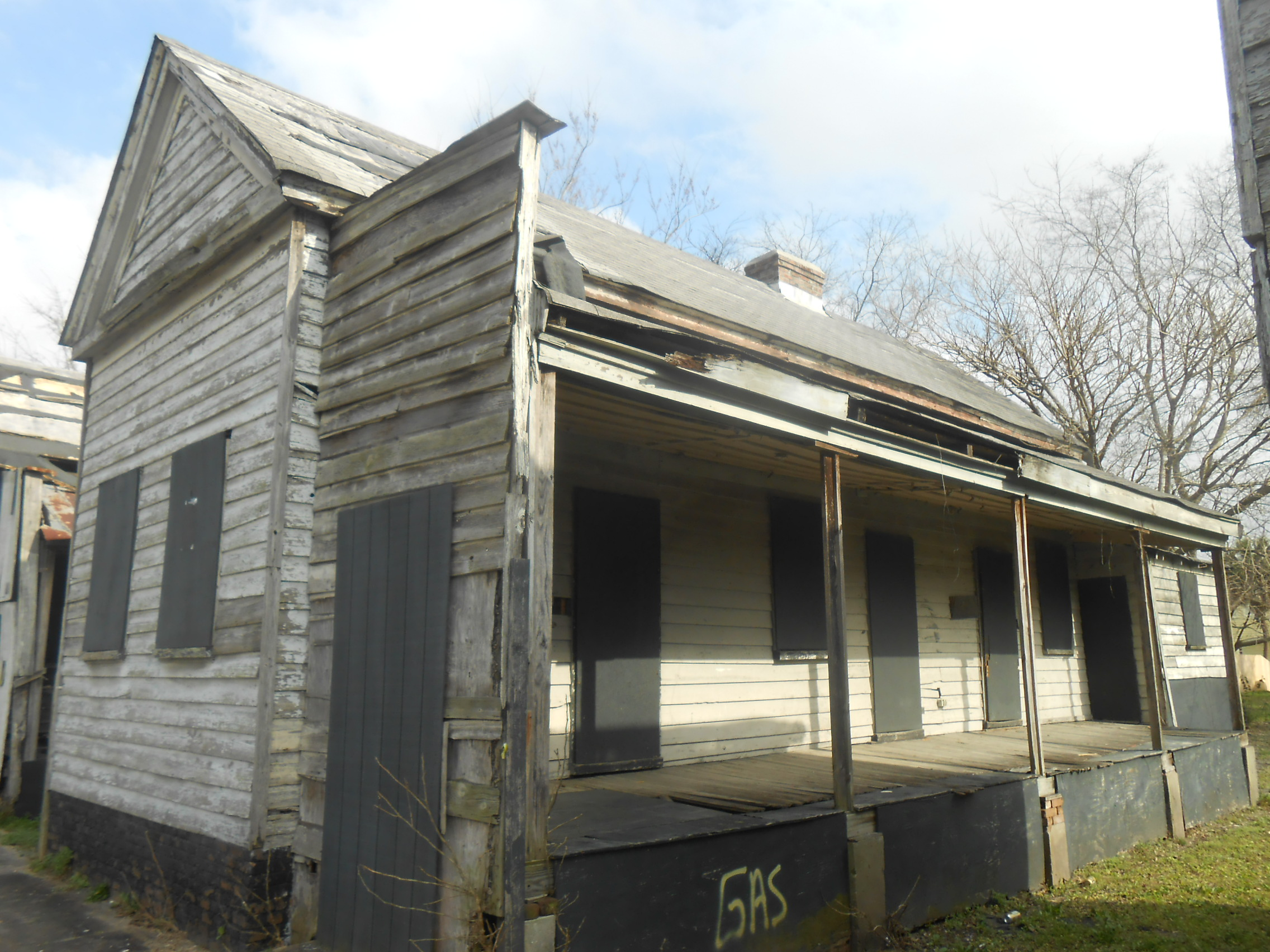
195 Jackson Street

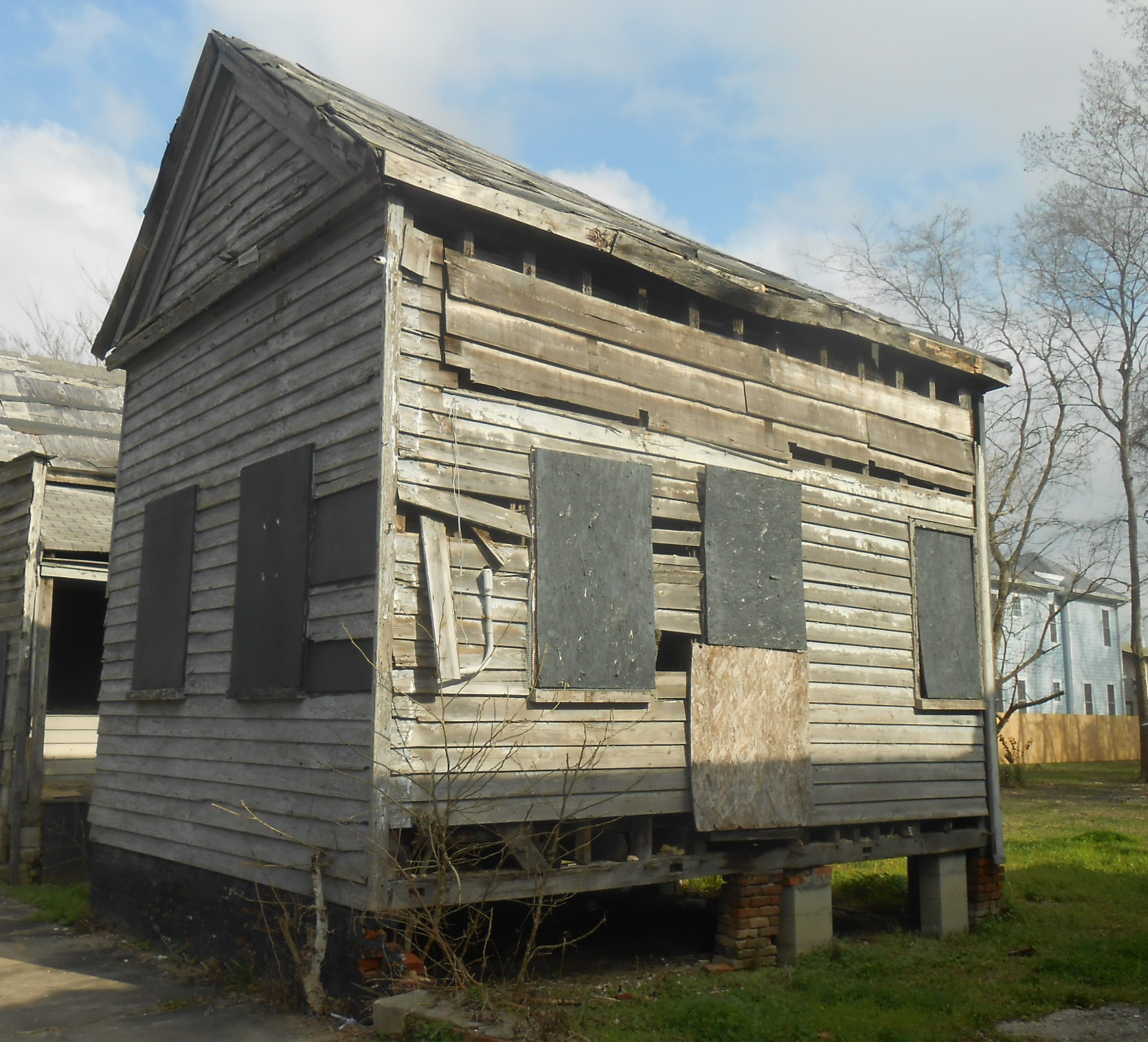
197 Jackson Street

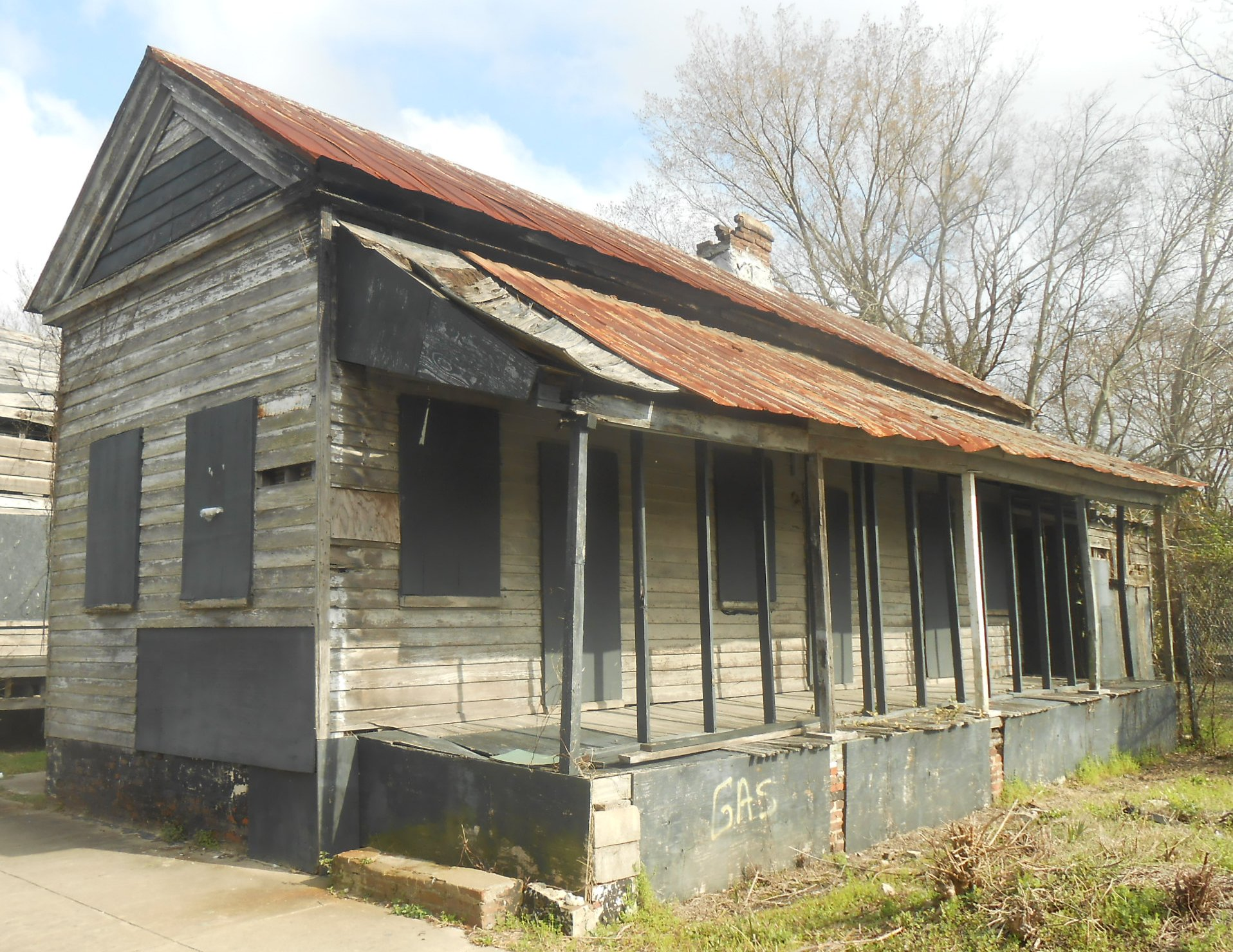
199 Jackson Street

After being added to the National Register, the four houses were restored.

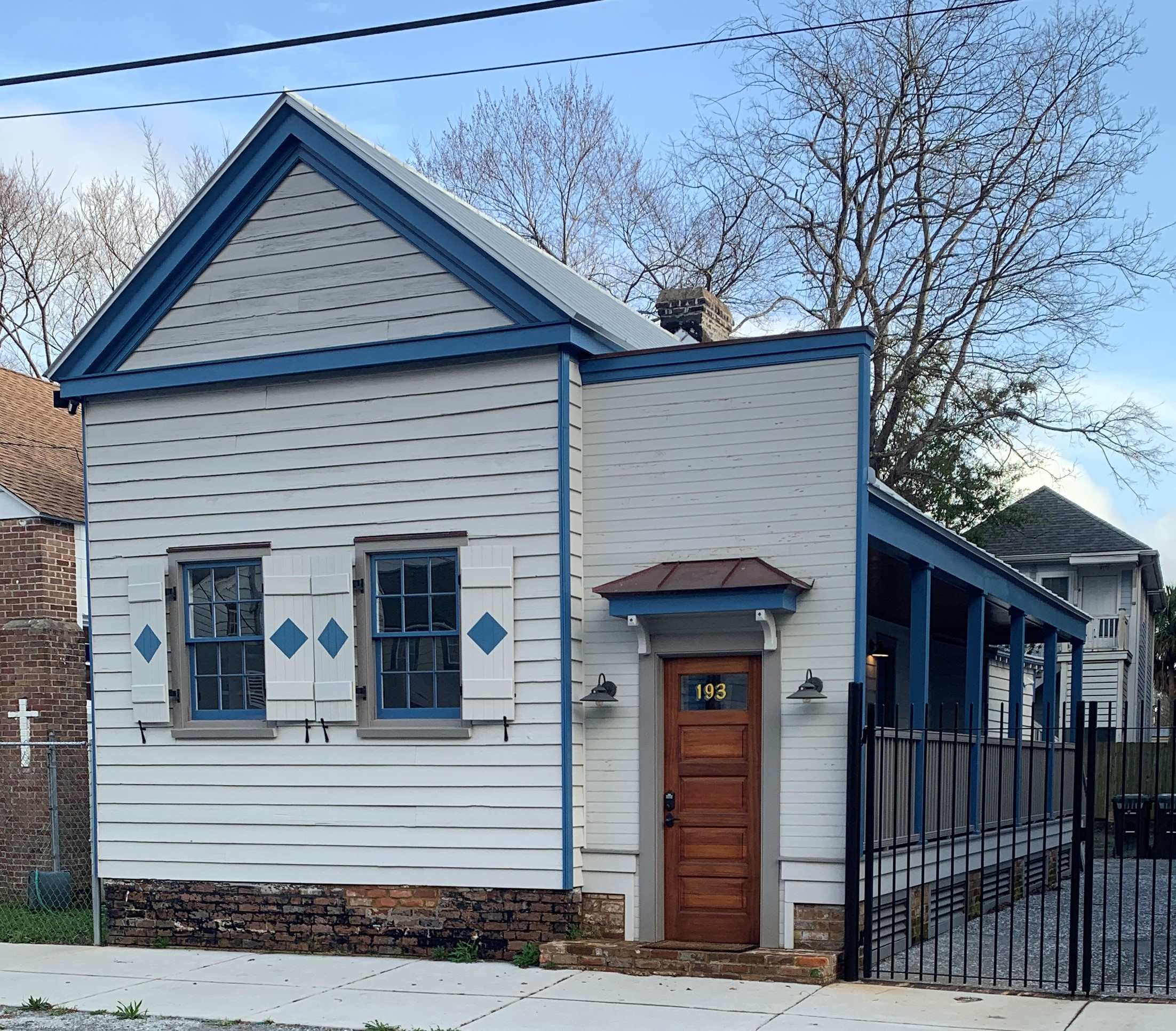
193 Jackson Street

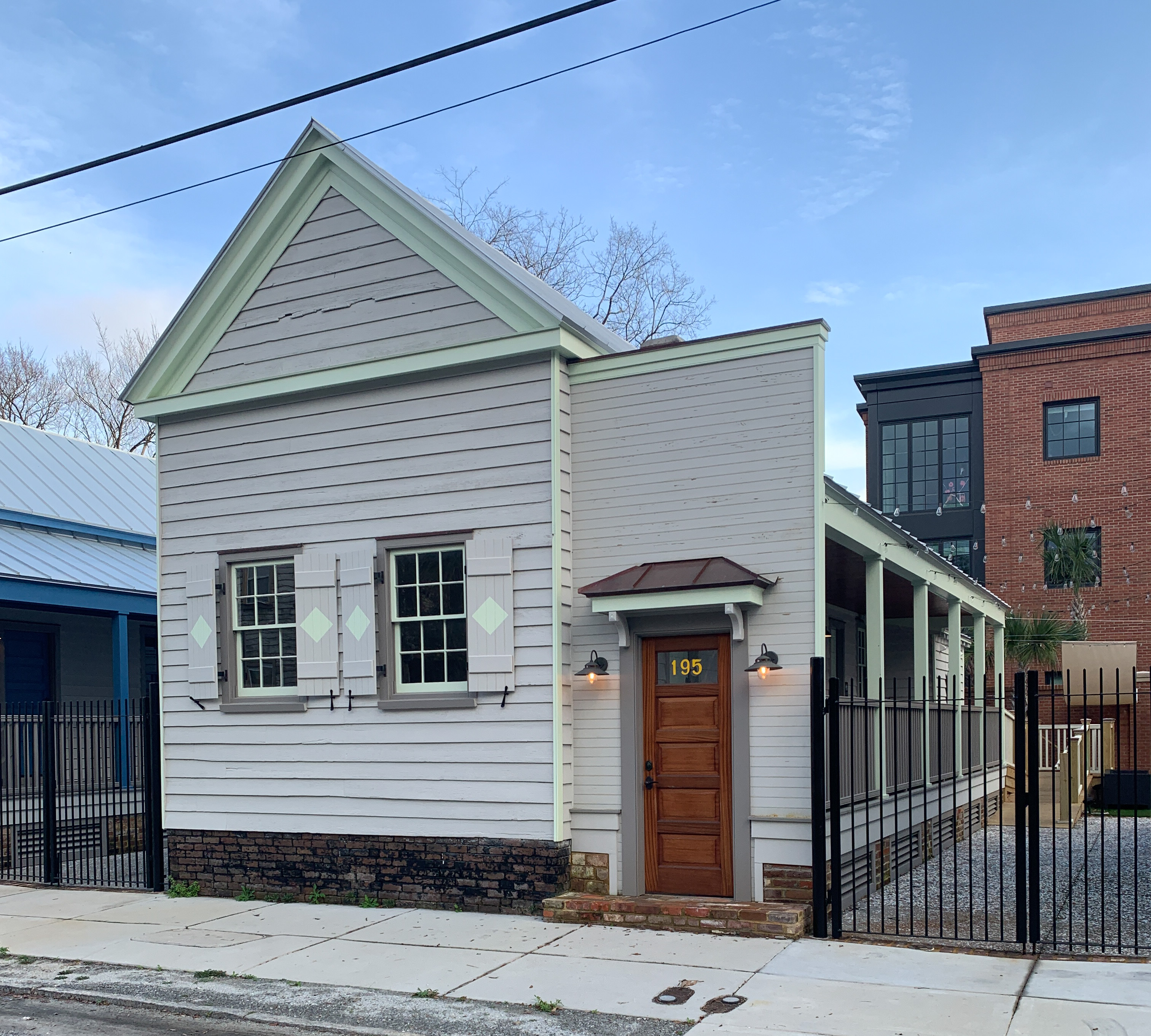
195 Jackson Street

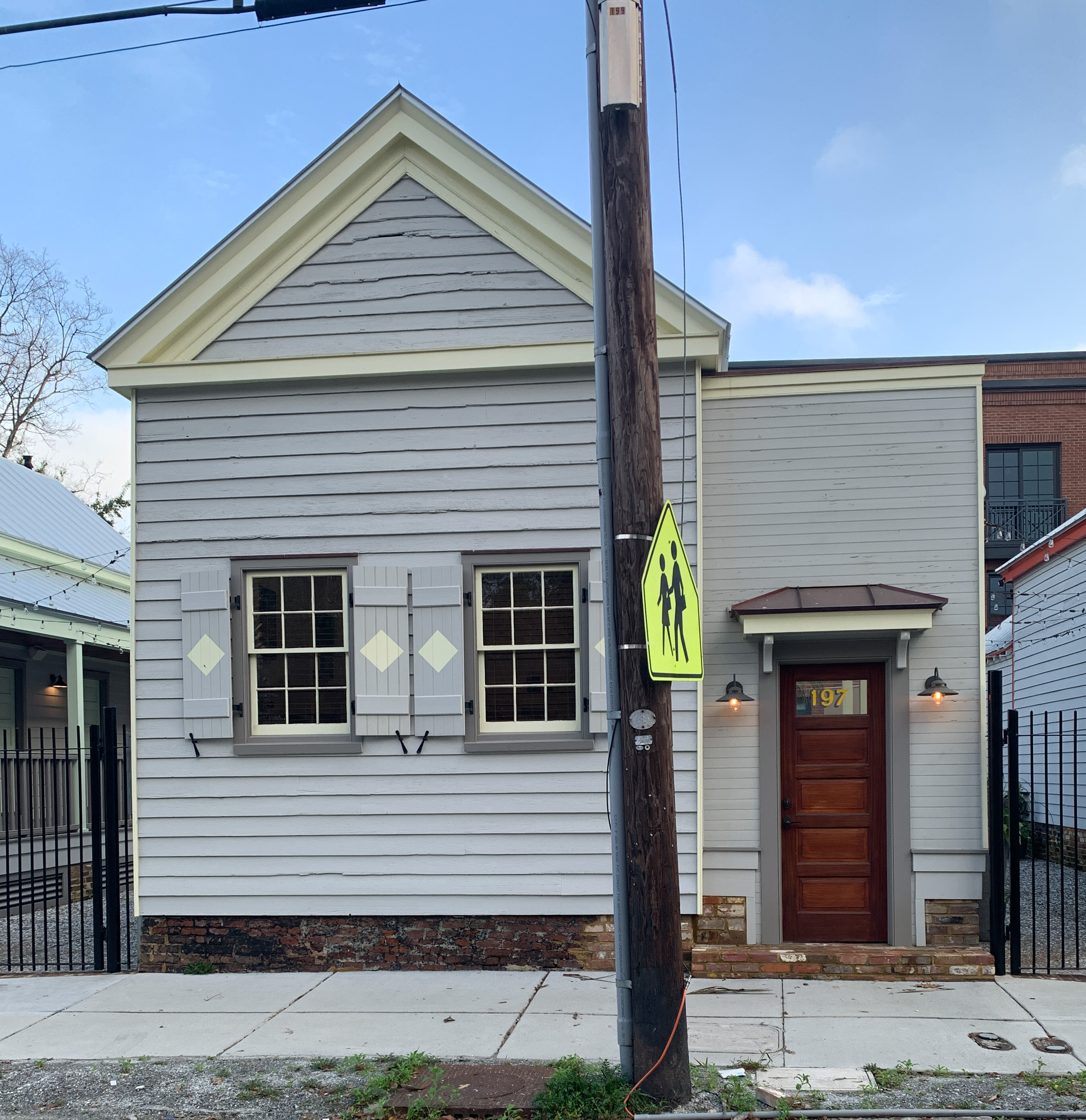
197 Jackson Street

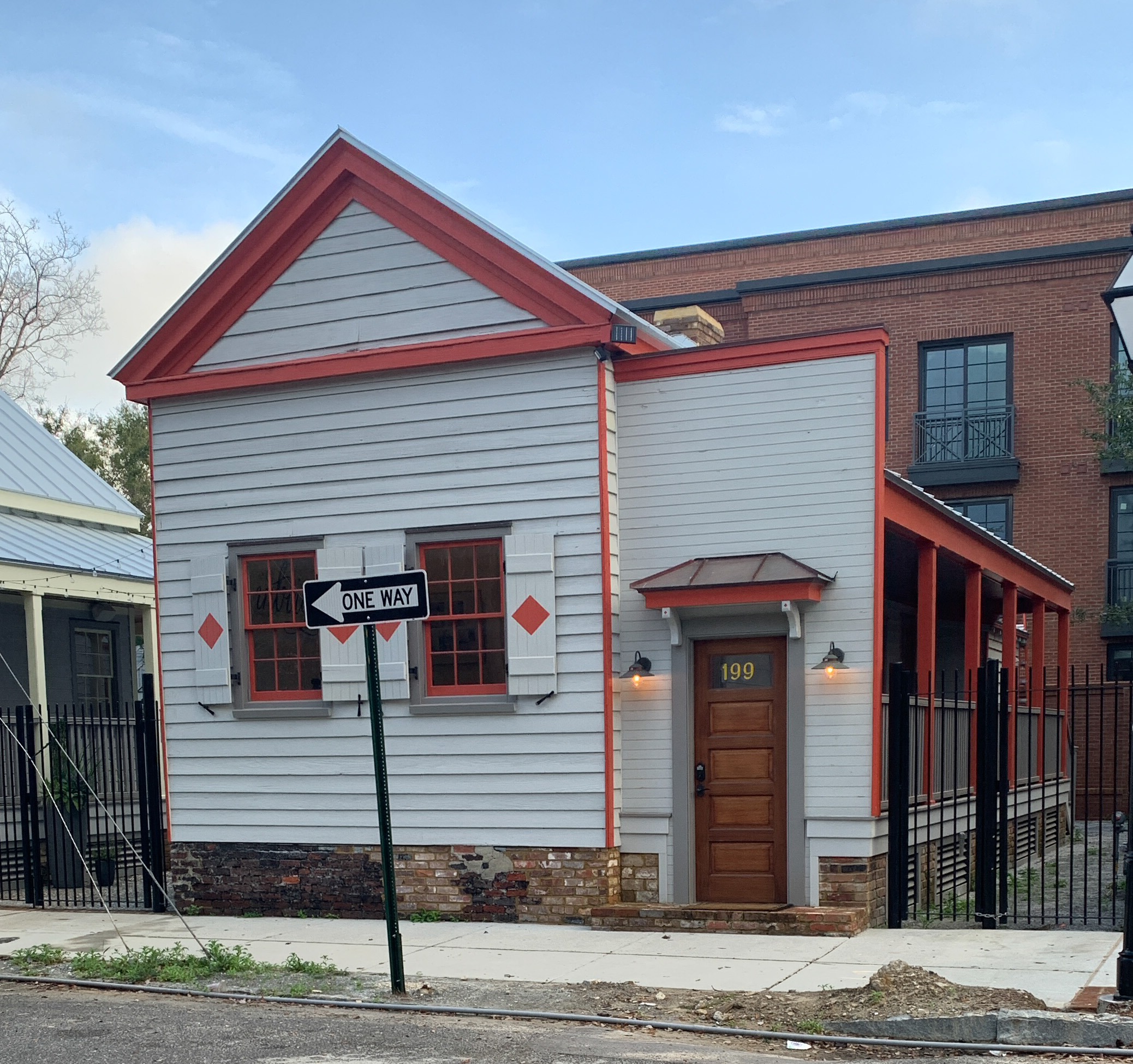
199 Jackson Street

== See also ==
- National Register of Historic Places listings in Charleston, South Carolina
