= Charleston cottage =

Architectural style

A Charleston cottage is a vernacular form of house found in Charleston, South Carolina.

The houses often have only two rooms with one or both having doors onto a piazza on the side. The houses often had less than 500 square feet. The two rooms are arranged perpendicularly to the street and often have a fireplace between the front and rear room with a shared flue. The form is sometimes compared to the Charleston single house; a Charleston single house also has two rooms per floor arranged perpendicularly to the street, often with piazzas, but divides the two room with a short staircase to the upper floors.

Although commonly called "freedman's cottages," suggesting that the small houses were built after the American Civil War by newly freed people, the house form was actually popular with working-class families of all races and backgrounds until the early 20th century. The "freedman's cottage" name was not used until the 1990s, and most of the examples were built between 1880 and 1910.

== Gallery ==
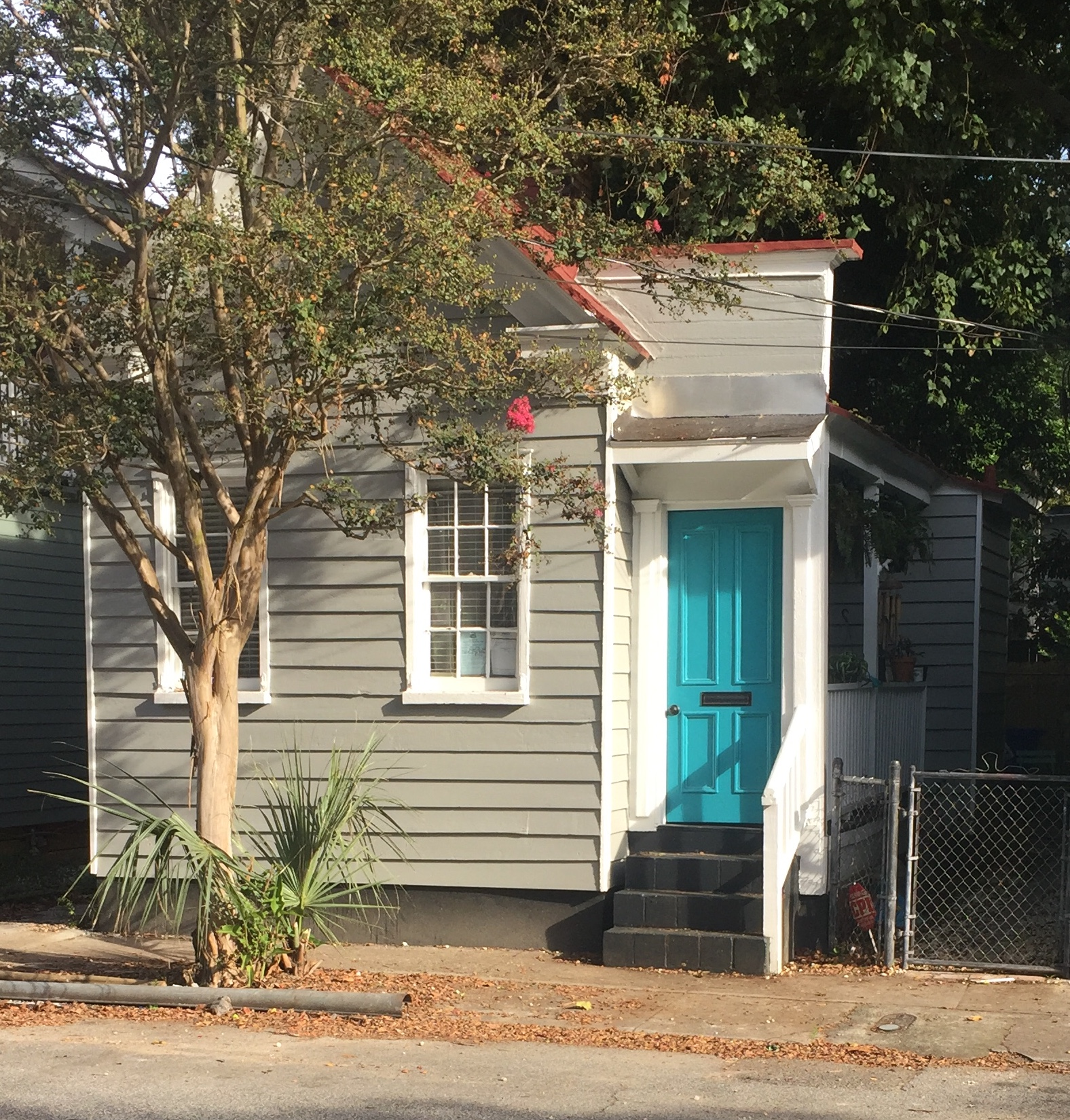
Charleston cottages are always small houses with a piazza along one side.

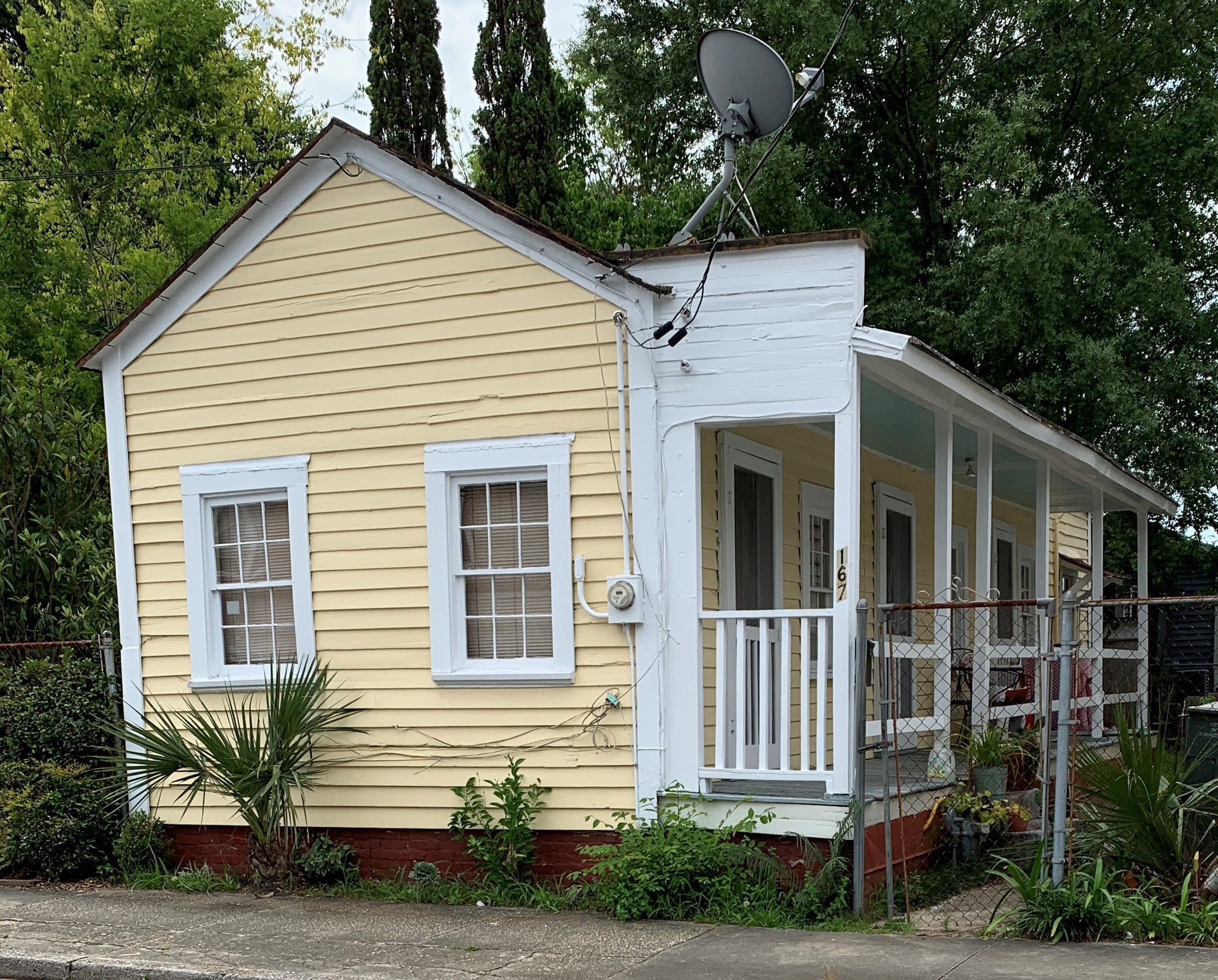
Exterior doors from each room to the piazza as seen at 167 Romney Street increased the flexibility of a very simple interior layout.

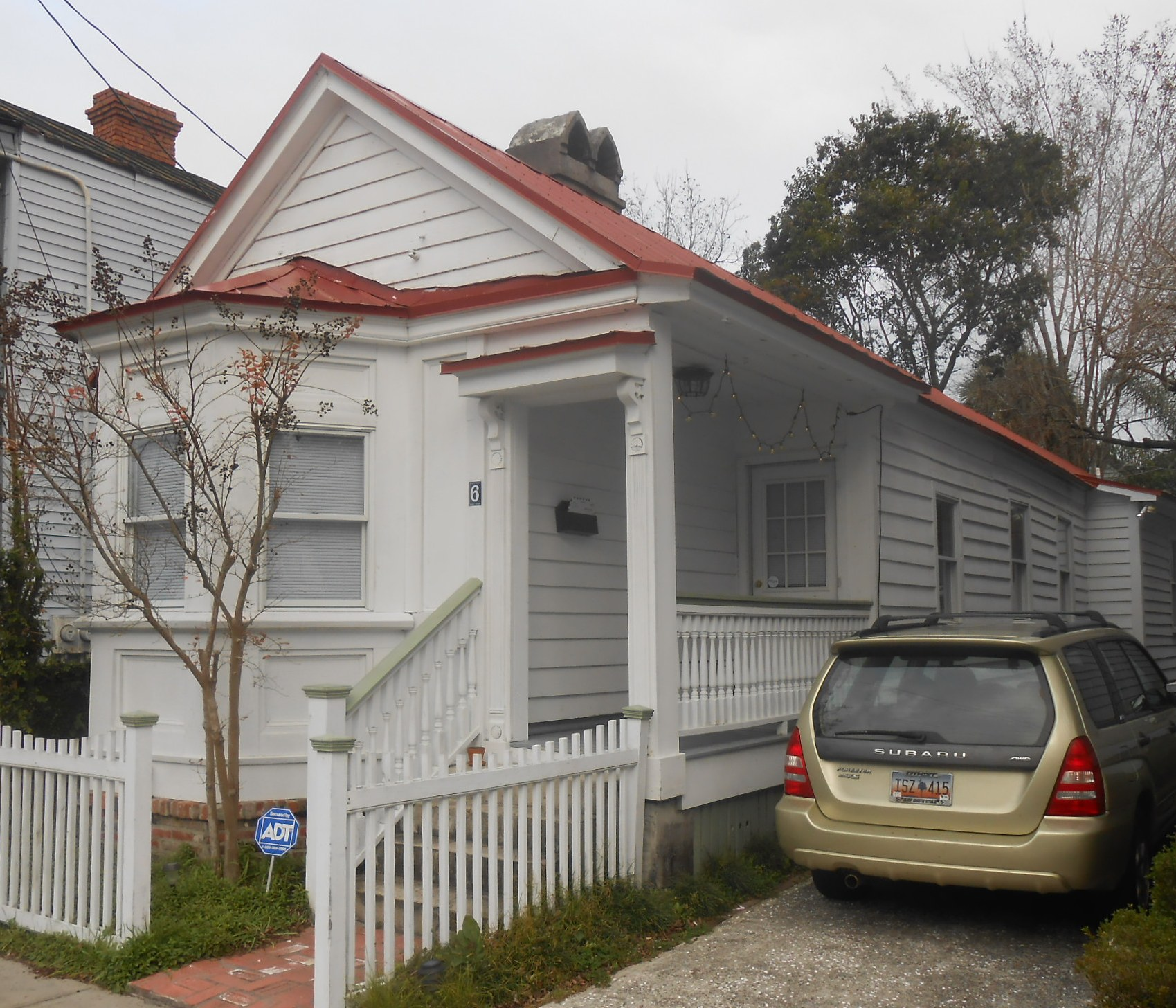
Charleston cottages were not completely without architectural details as this example at 6 Larnes Street shows.

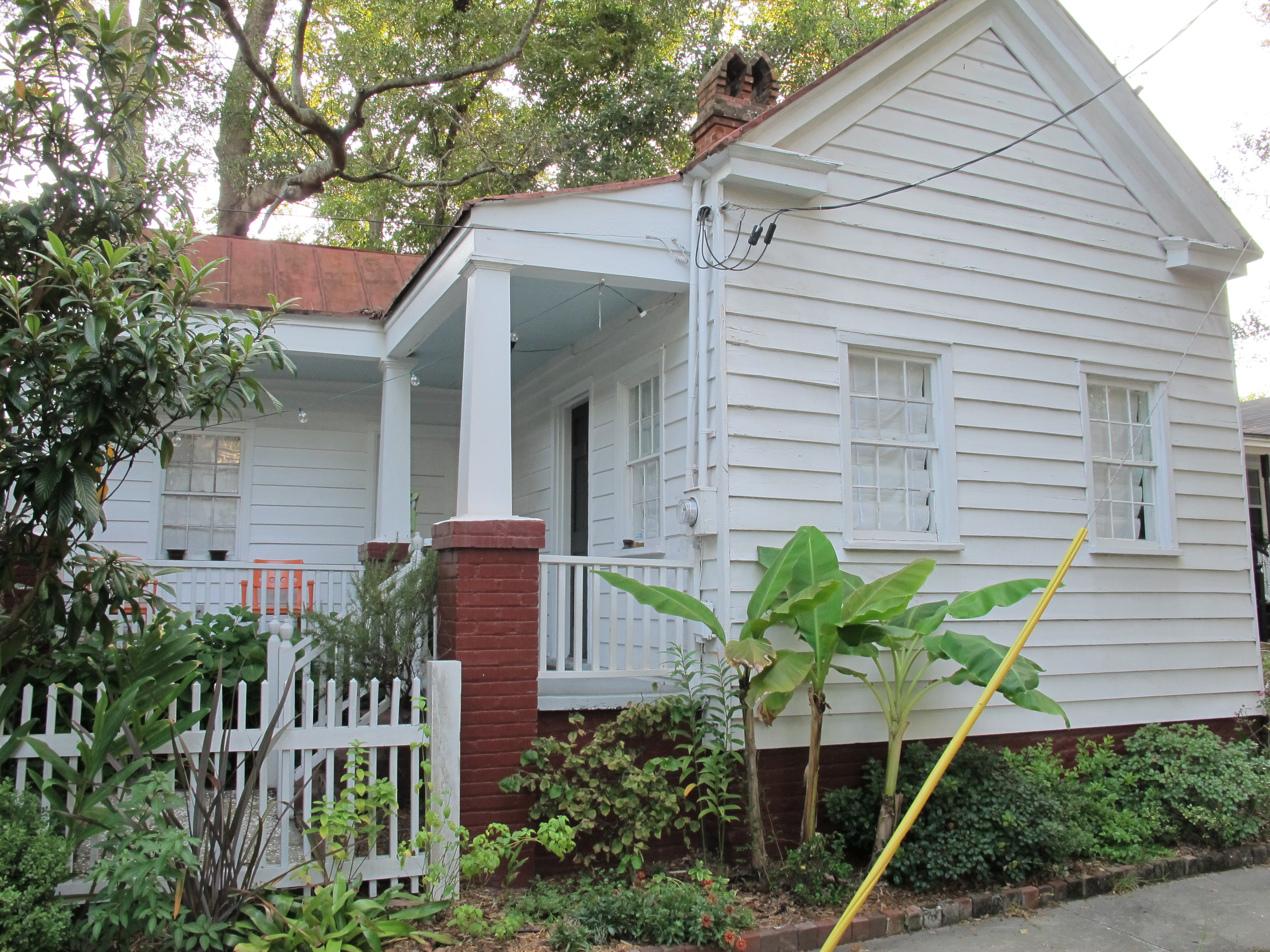
Many Charleston cottages have had additions to enlarge them such as this example at 1 Sutherland Court which had a room added at a right angle the house.
