= Penn School Historic District Campus =

Historic buildings located in the Penn School Historic District

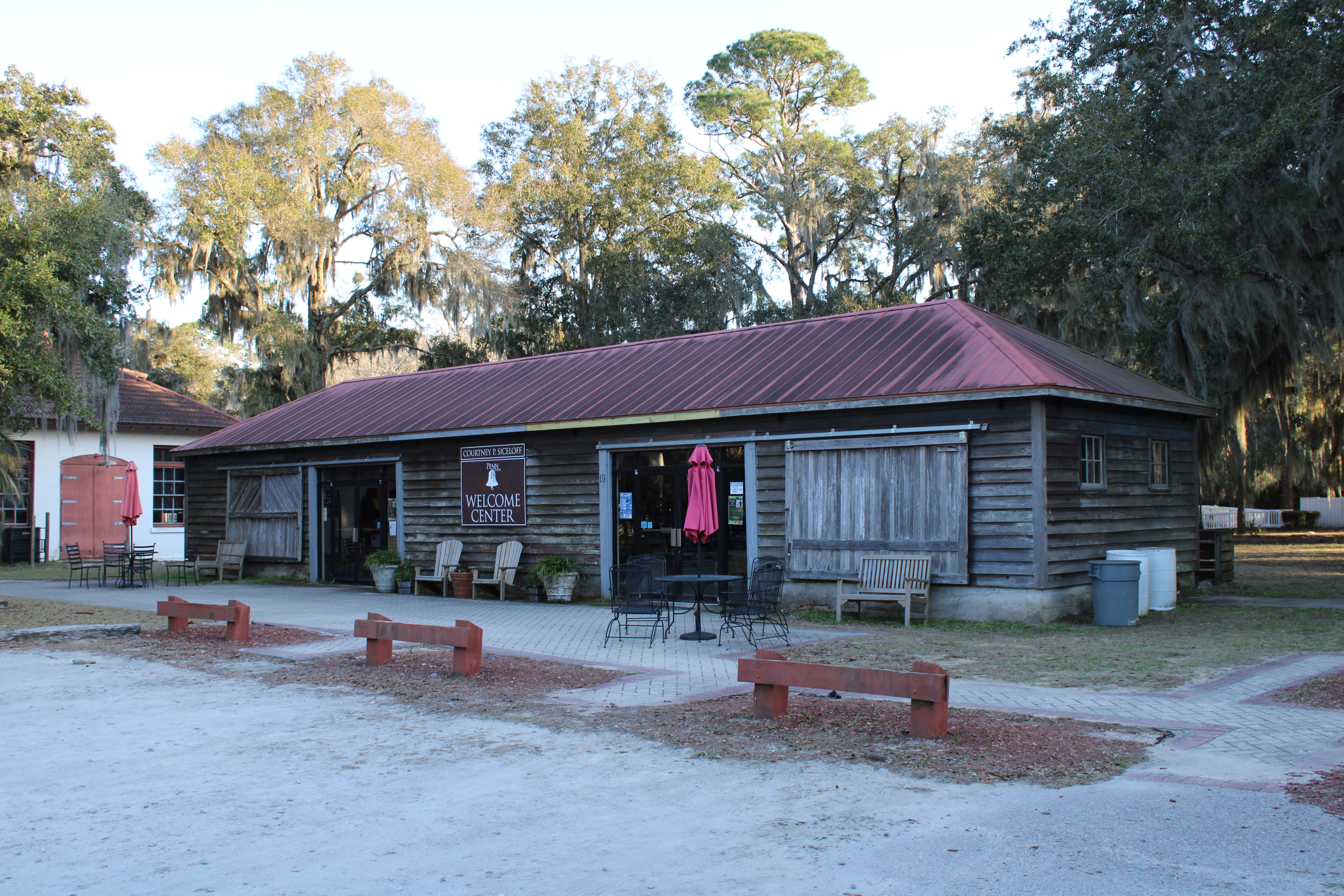
Courtney Siceloff Welcome Center

The Penn School Historic District Campus consists of the grounds of the Penn Center, a historic school founded in 1862, located on Saint Helena Island in South Carolina, United States. It was designated a National Historic Landmark District in 1974.

The total of 400 acres owned by the Penn Center, formerly the Penn Normal, Industrial, and Agricultural School, has remained almost unchanged over the more than century since Penn's founding. The biologically rich landscape and farmland of Penn Center's campus is dotted with marshes and creeks, and is home to a variety of Live Oaks, Yellow Jasmine, Palmettoes, and Wisteria.

Of the 400 acres, 47 of them were developed for use by Penn School. The buildings of Penn Center's campus span over a century of heritage and architecture. Some buildings are even unchanged in their use. The buildings of the Penn Center campus are unified by their purpose, having served the black Gullah community of Saint Helena, South Carolina.

== Organization ==
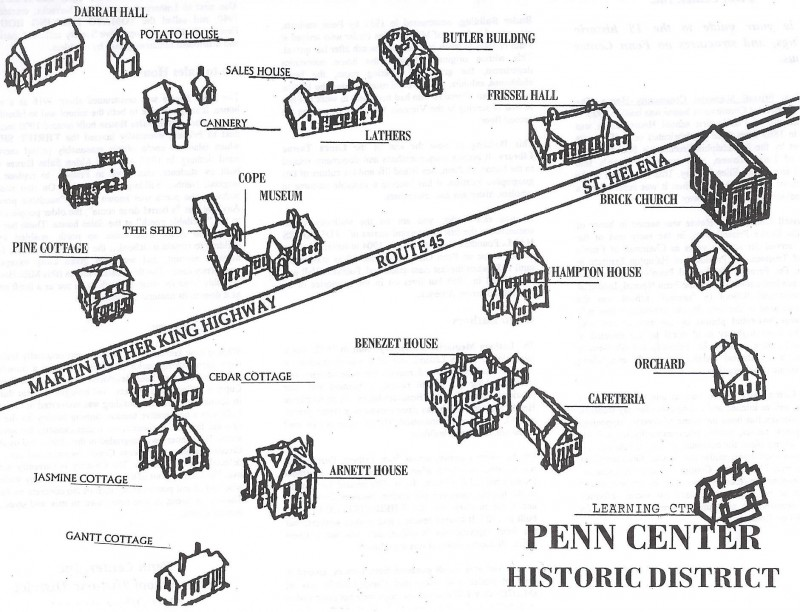
Penn Center Historic District Campus Map

Penn Center is divided in two main halves: The East campus and the West campus separated by Dr. Martin Luther King Dr., also known as Route 45.

The East campus is composed mostly of residential buildings and dormitories. Notable buildings on the East campus include the Brick Baptist Church, the Emory S. Campbell Dining Hall, and the Green Learning Center Rosenwald School.

The West campus is composed mostly of School buildings, Community Buildings, and Farm Buildings. Notable buildings on the west campus include the Frissell Community House, Darrah Hall, and the Cope Industrial Shop. The majority of Penn Center's campus is located on its West campus with a large vineyard located on the path to the far end of west campus. The western boundary of West Campus ends at a cove of Capers Creek, a distributary of the Atlantic Ocean where the Retreat House and Dock is located.

== Dormitory and Residence Buildings ==
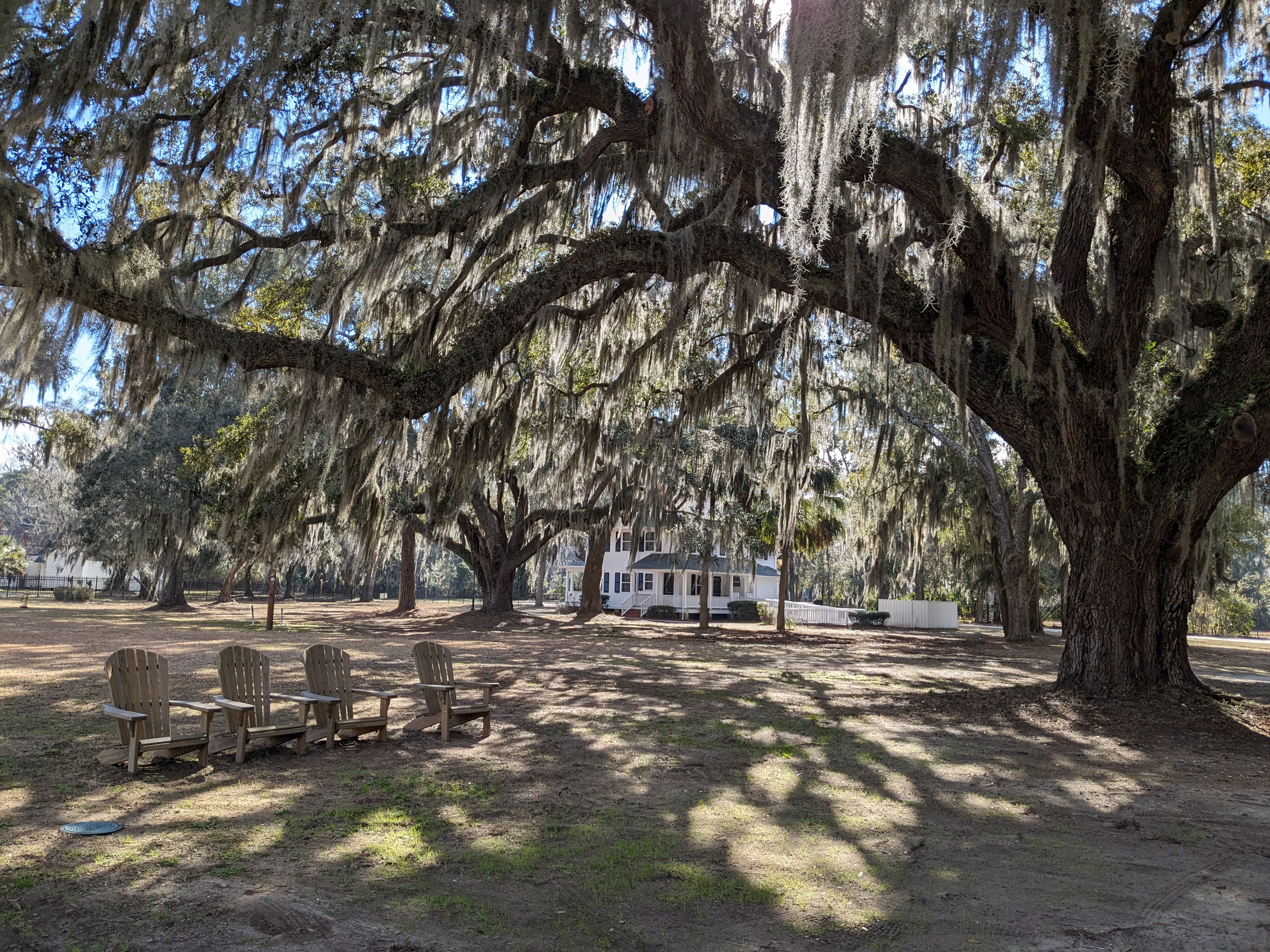
Southern Live Oaks of Penn's Campus with Hampton House in background

=== Hampton House ===
Built in 1904, the Hampton House was dedicated by name, in January 1905, after the Hampton Institute. The Hampton Institute is a historically black industrial school in Hampton, Virginia, and served as a model for Penn School's change into Penn Normal, even sponsoring Penn Center between 1901 and 1917. Hampton was designed to house two resident teachers with two more rooms for guests. Early principals of Penn - Rose Cooley and Grace House - lived in Hampton and entertained guests such as hosting tea parties, even using the house for weddings. Hampton House is surrounded by a field of Oak Trees and Yuccas plants. Palmetto and Pine trees were planted around the house by Penn students. The house today accommodates overnight guests of Penn Center.

=== Benezet House ===
Benezet House, also known as Benezette House, is an historic dormitory located on the campus of Penn Center. It was built in 1905, completed in March 1906, and named after Frenchman, Anthony Benezet. The female teachers and boarding students of Penn took residence in Benezet, with the first group moving in in May 1906. Female students had to live in Benezet before they graduated, as this was the spot for home economics classes for the female students. Today, Benezet House is used to house overnight guests.

=== Cedar Cottage ===
Cedar Cottage was built in 1907 as a residence for Penn's single female teachers, as well as for use as the nurse's office and dispensary. Originally named Carpenter's Cottage, built by and for Penn School's first carpenter, Mr. Stevens., it was moved across Penn's campus and became known as Cope Cottage between 1912 and 1924, it is now named after the abundant cedar trees of St. Helena Island. In 1952, Cedar Cottage was used to establish the first children's nursery and day care in Beaufort County.

=== Jasmine Cottage ===
Jasmine Cottage was built in 1911 by the carpentry students of Penn Center and is named after the Yellow Jasmine flower. It was designed and built to house teachers and their families. Jasmine Cottage was a part of the Better Homes Demonstration of October 1922, a national initiative, of which the chapter on the island was spearheaded by the school's assistant principle; Grace Bigelow House.Jasmine Cottage won the Third Place Prize.

=== Pine Grove Cottage ===
Pine Grove Cottage, built in 1921, was constructed by Penn students under the instruction of Mr. Benjamin Boyd, who taught carpentry at Penn from 1919 to 1948. It originally was the superintendent's cottage, while today it is used for housing guests visiting Penn Center.

=== Lathers Memorial Dormitory ===
The Lathers Memorial Dormitory, named for former teacher Agnes Lathers, was built in 1922. It was dedicated May of that year of which graduates of Penn attended. Lathers was originally a men's dormitory, but this building is used today as the Administration offices.

=== Arnett House ===
Arnett House was built in 1937 by students and local residents, it was designed to accommodate up to twenty-four people and was used to house students and visiting teachers from South Carolina State University. Arnett House is named in honor of Dr. Trevor Arnett, and has been used to house conferences and conference guests since the 30's and into today.

=== Gantt Cottage ===
The Gantt Cottage on Penn's campus today was built in 1940 by the students of Penn as a replacement to the original cottage. Gantt Cottage was named after the ex-enslaved Hastings Gantt, who donated the land that constitutes Penn's campus to Laura Towne. The original Gantt Cottage was used for teachers and their families and was as part of the 1939 Better Homes Demonstration of which it won Second Place Prize before it burned down around 1940.

During the 1960s Dr. Martin Luther King, Jr. stayed at the new Gantt Cottage. There, planning for the great Civil Rights "March on Washington" took place as well as the writing of the "I Have a Dream" speech.

=== Orchard Cottage ===
Orchard Cottage, built in 1942, was designed as a teacher's residence. It has also been utilized in recent years as a print shop, but today is not currently in use.

=== Retreat House and Dock ===
The Retreat House and Dock were built in 1968, designed with the intention for Dr. Martin Luther King, Jr., to use the new house in place of the smaller Gantt Cottage. The Retreat House was built on the site of the former Palmetto Cottage which was built in 1920 but was destroyed by fire in the 1950s.

=== Dormitory and residence Buildings Gallery ===
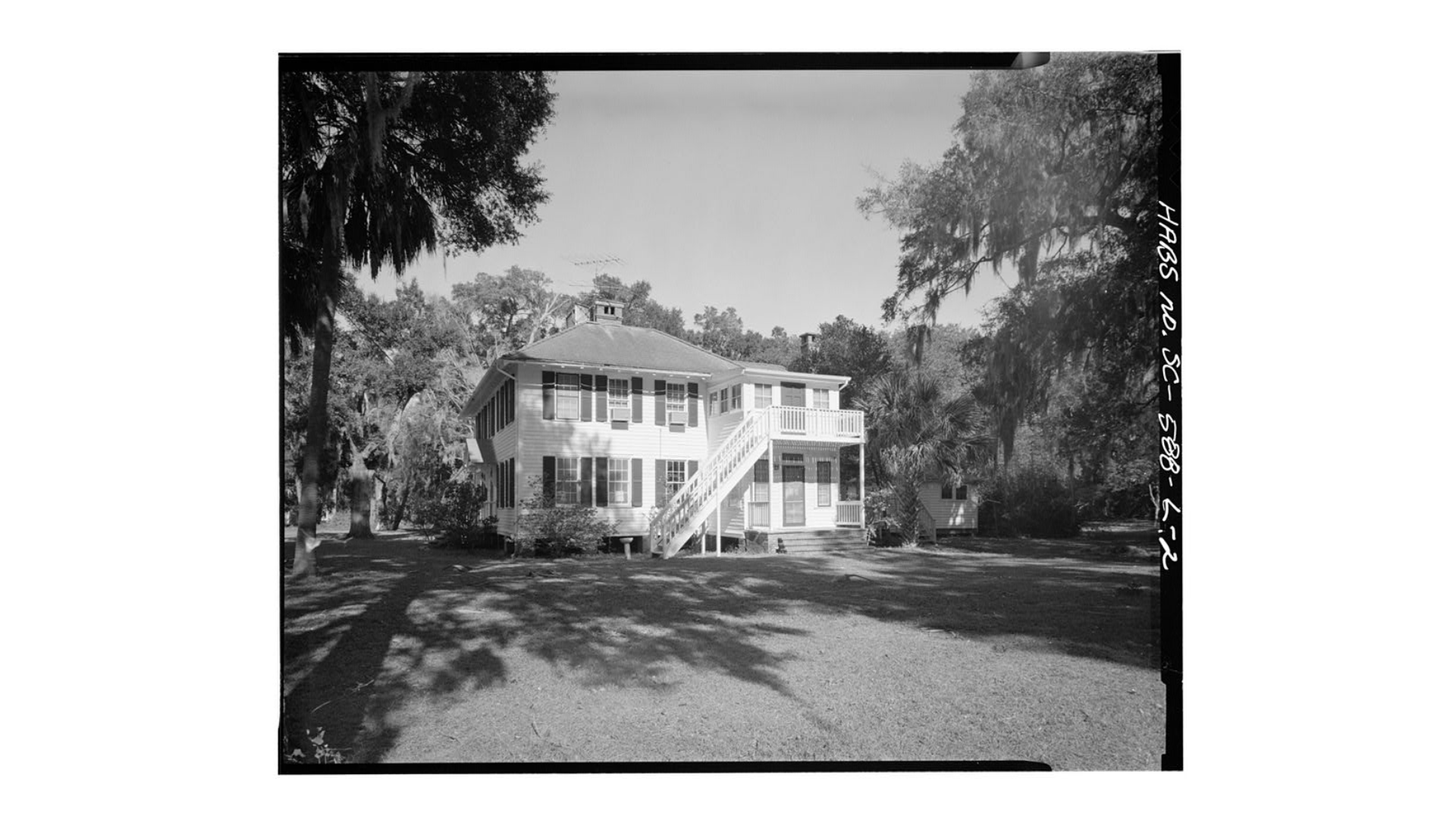
South (front) Elevation - Hampton House

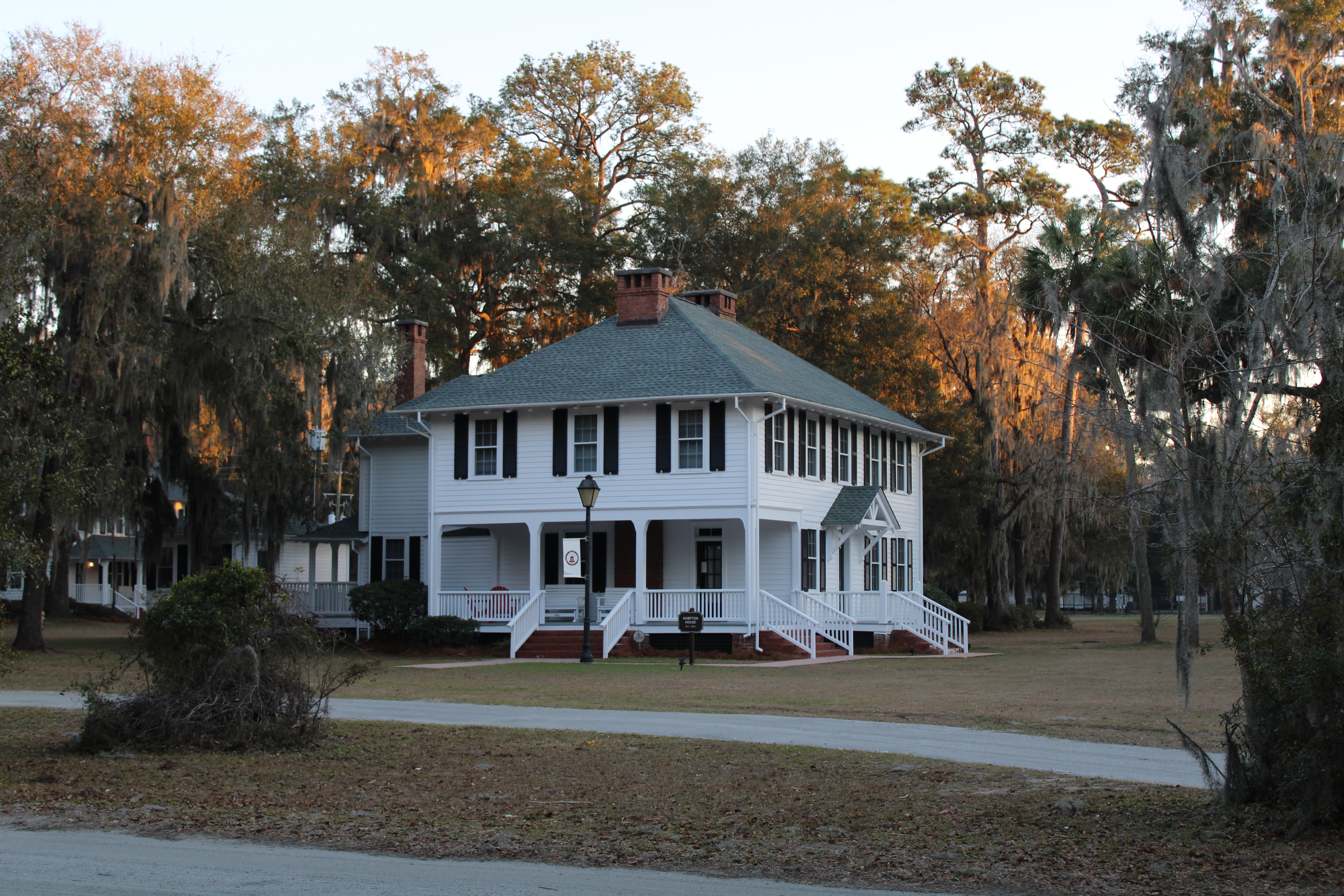
Hampton House

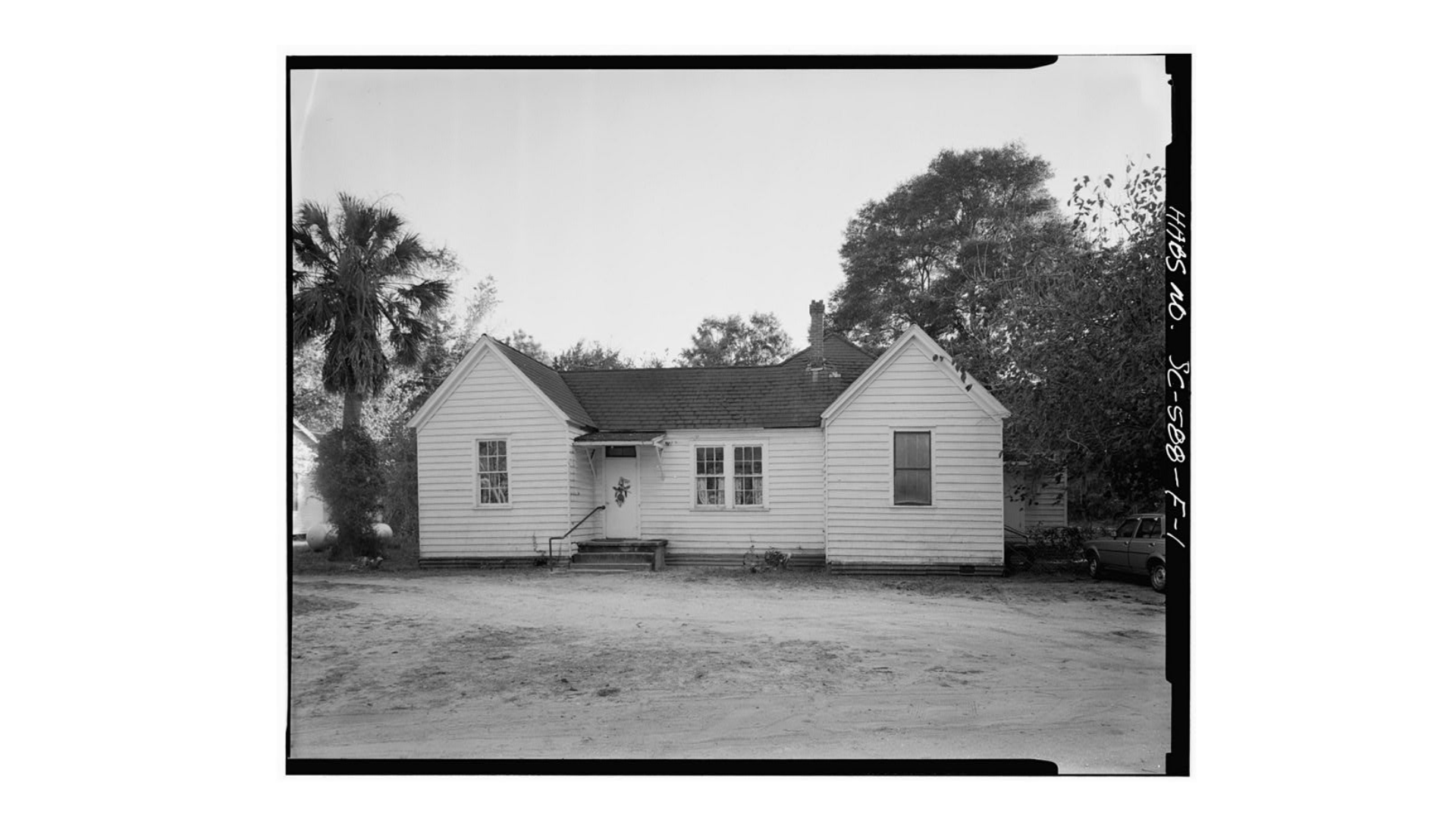
North (front) Elevation - Cedar Cottage

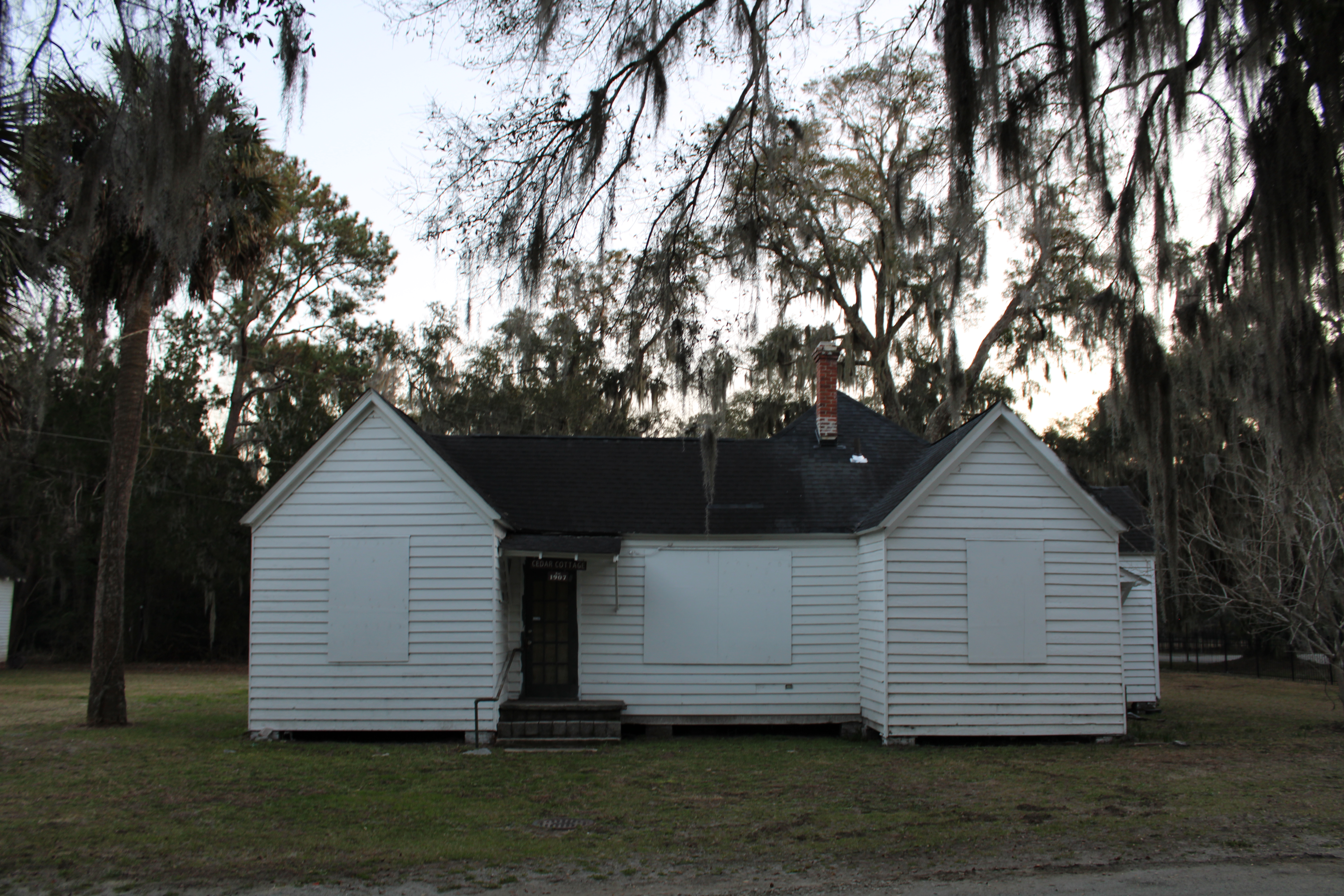
Cedar Cottage

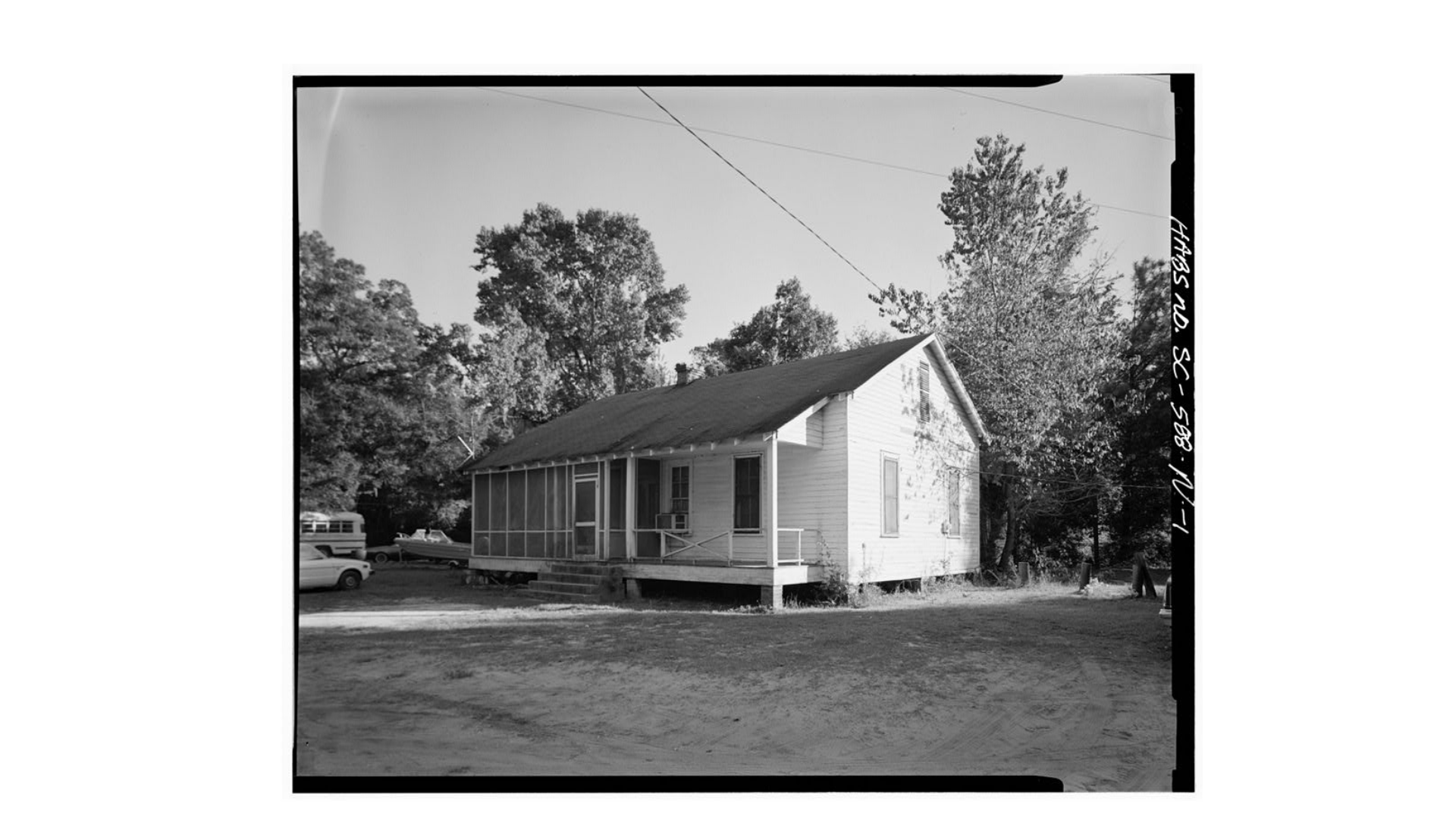
North (front) Elevation - Jasmine Cottage

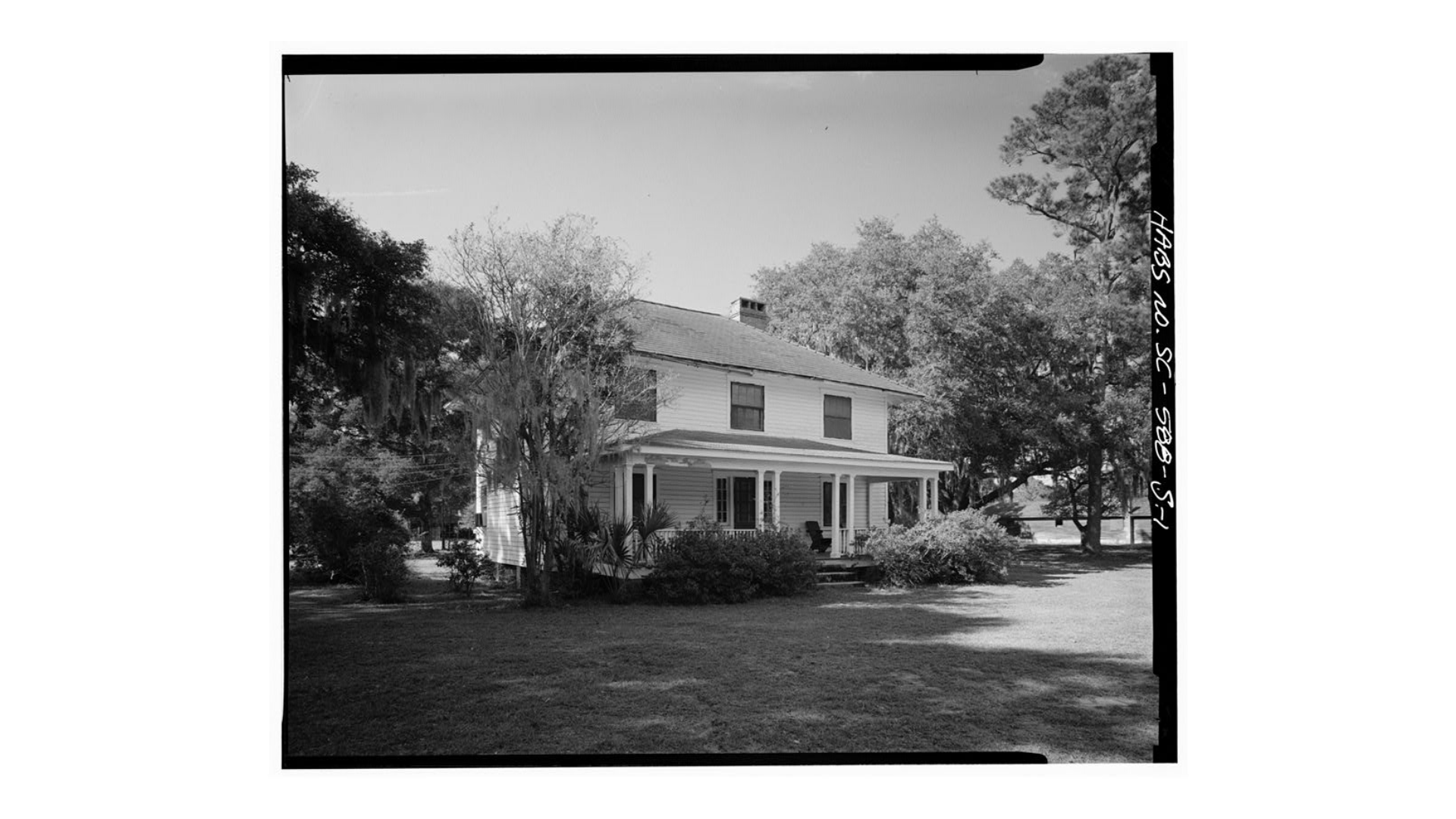
East (front) Elevation - Pine Cottage

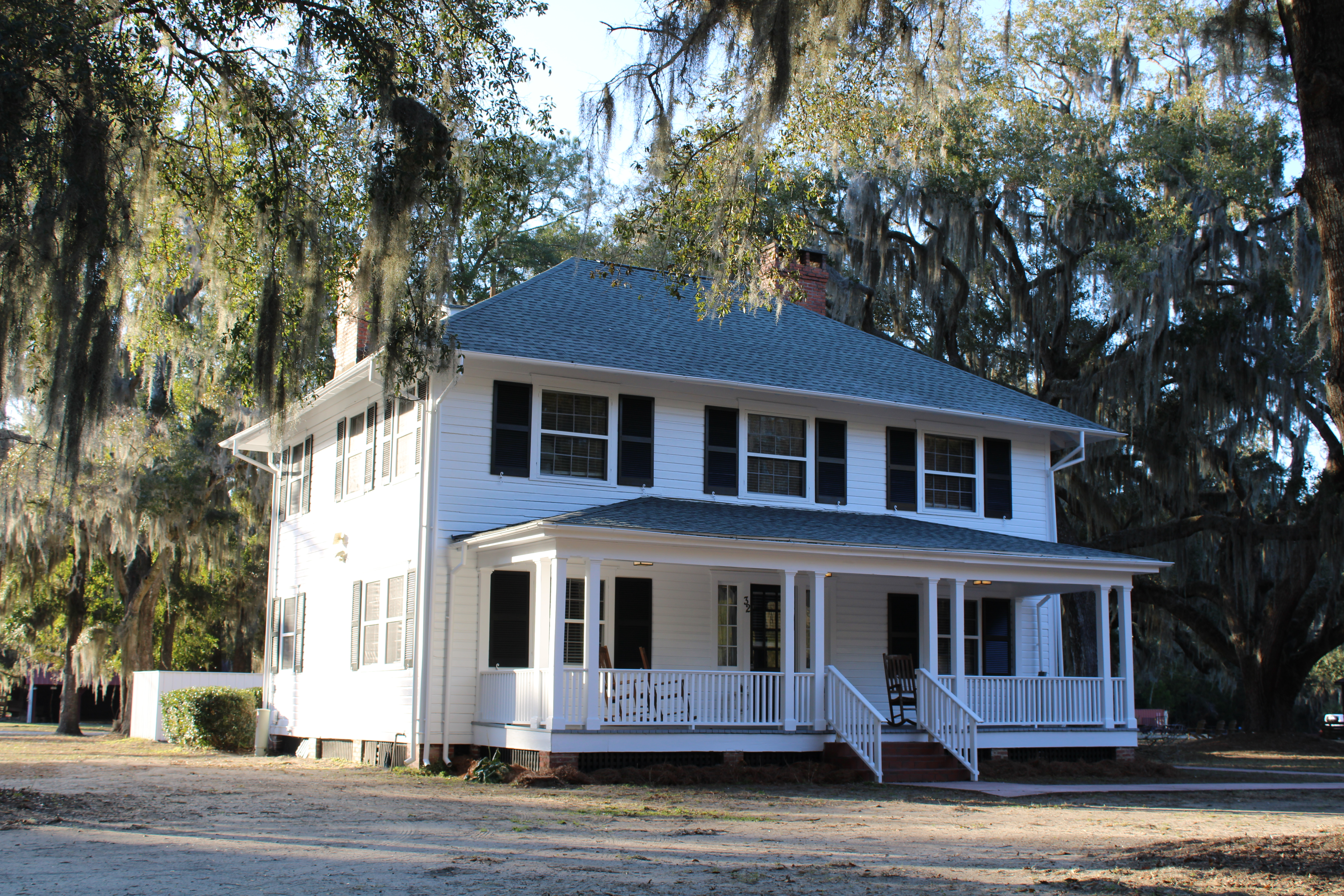
Pine Grove Cottage

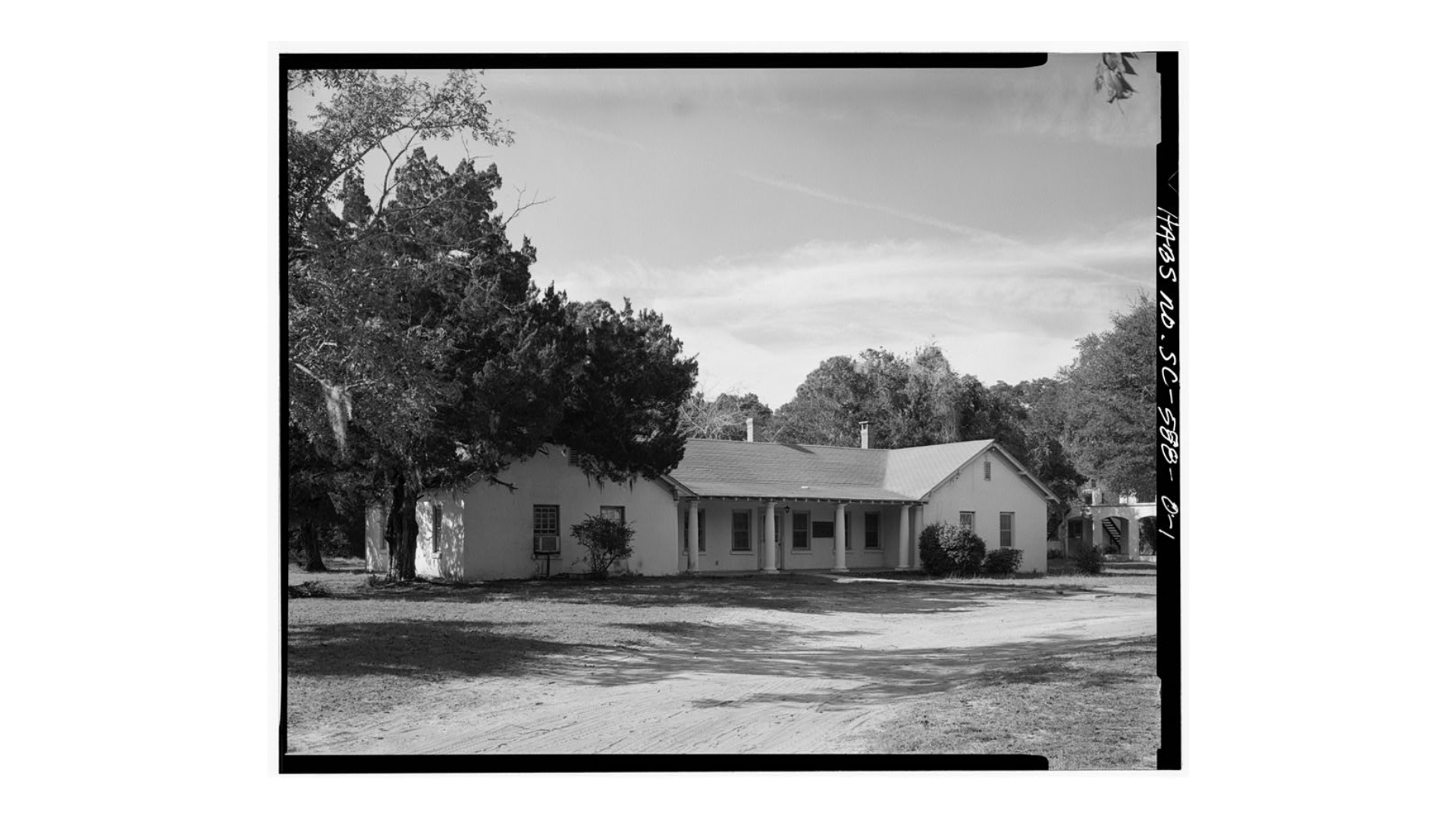
East (front) Elevation - Lathers Dormitory

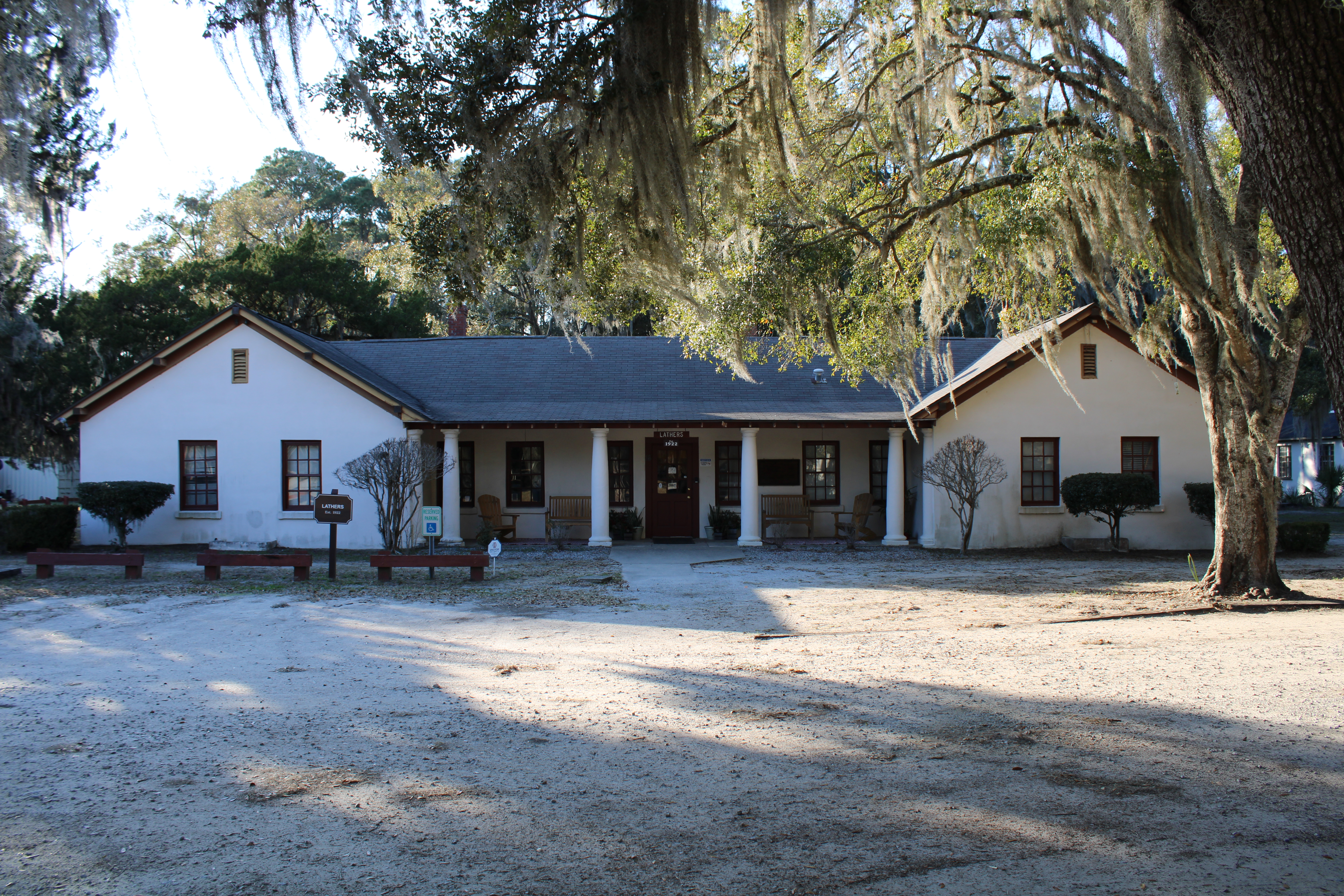
Lathers Dormitory

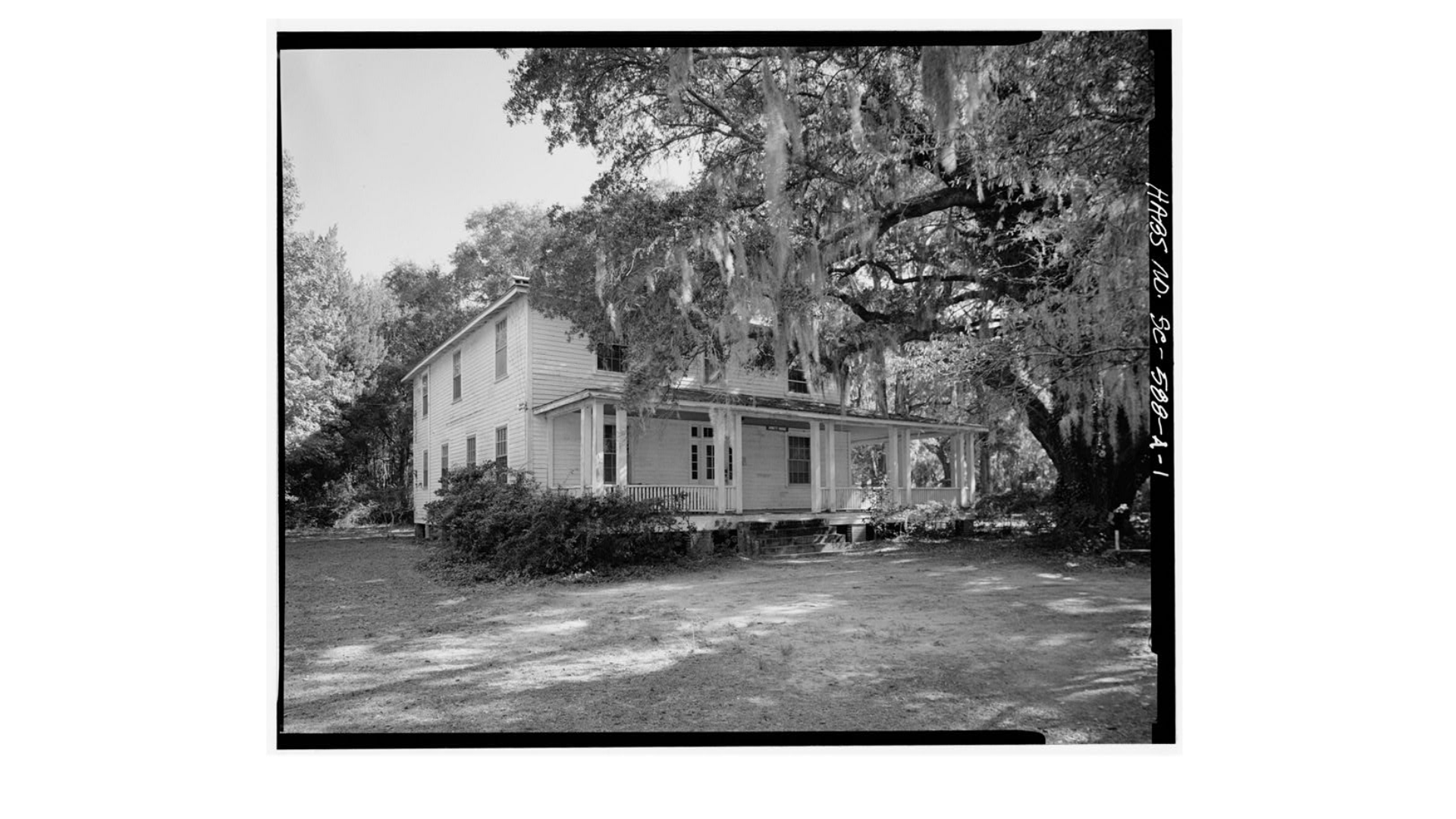
West (front) Elevation - Arnett Cottage

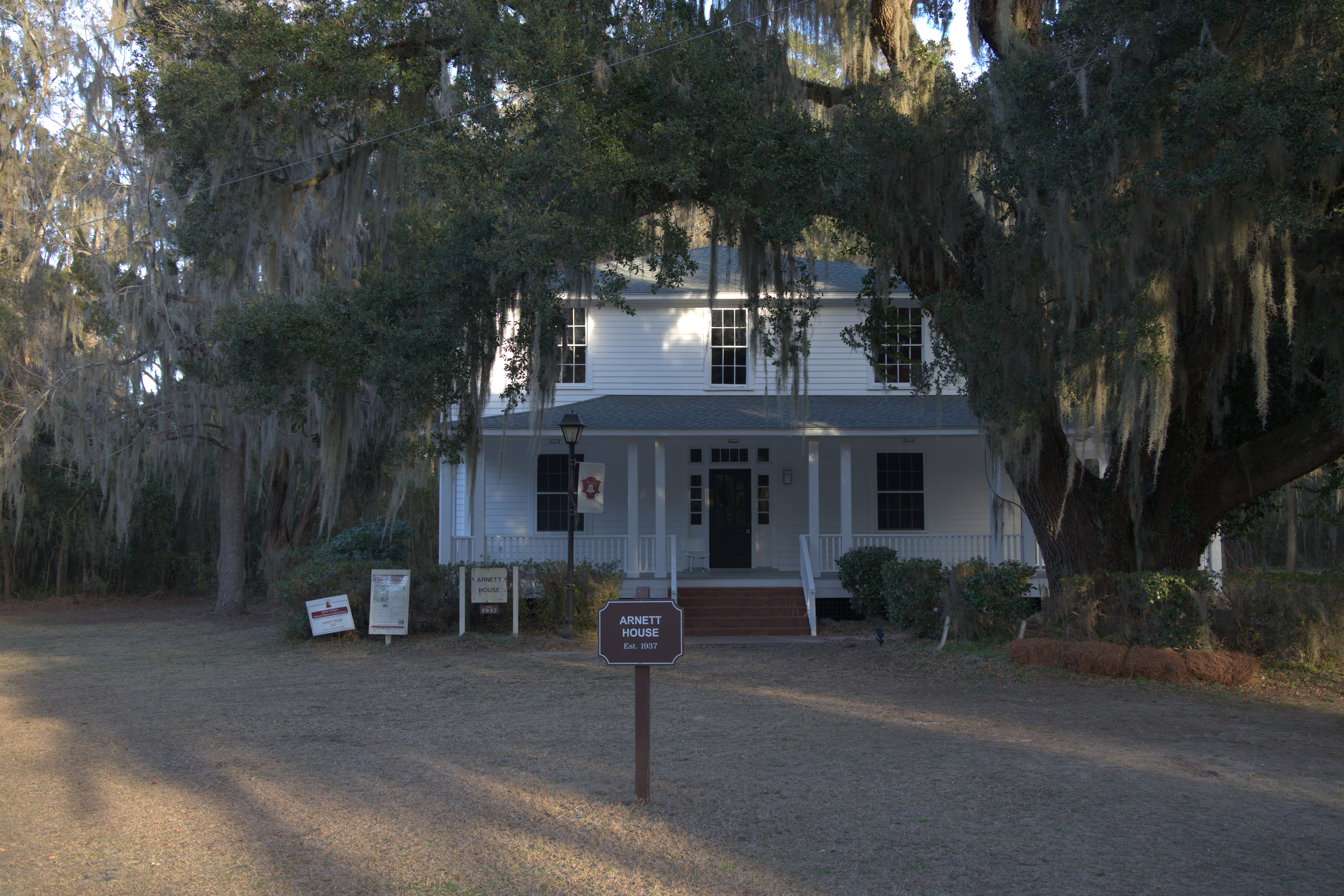
Arnett Cottage

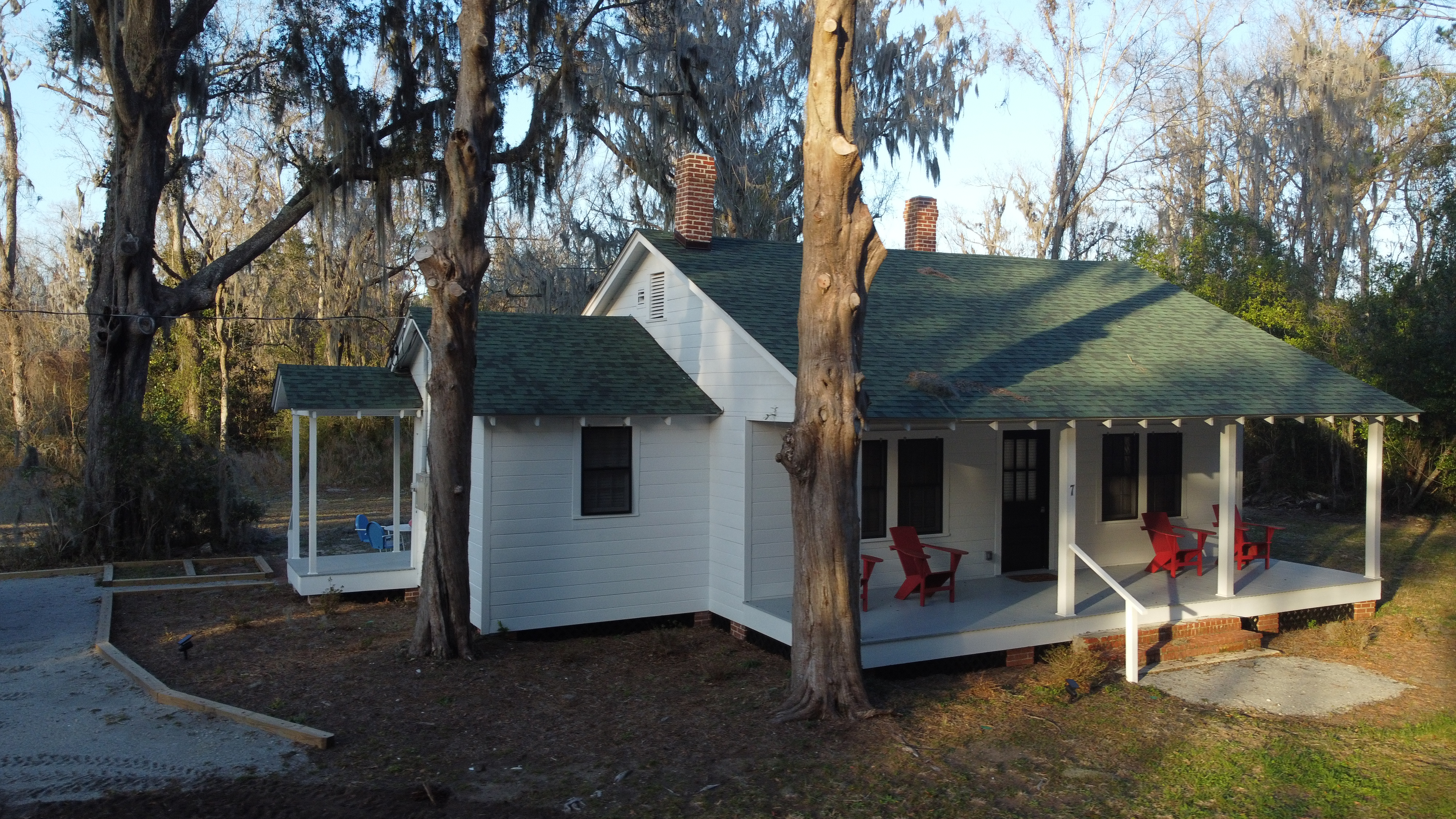
Orchard Cottage

== School Buildings ==
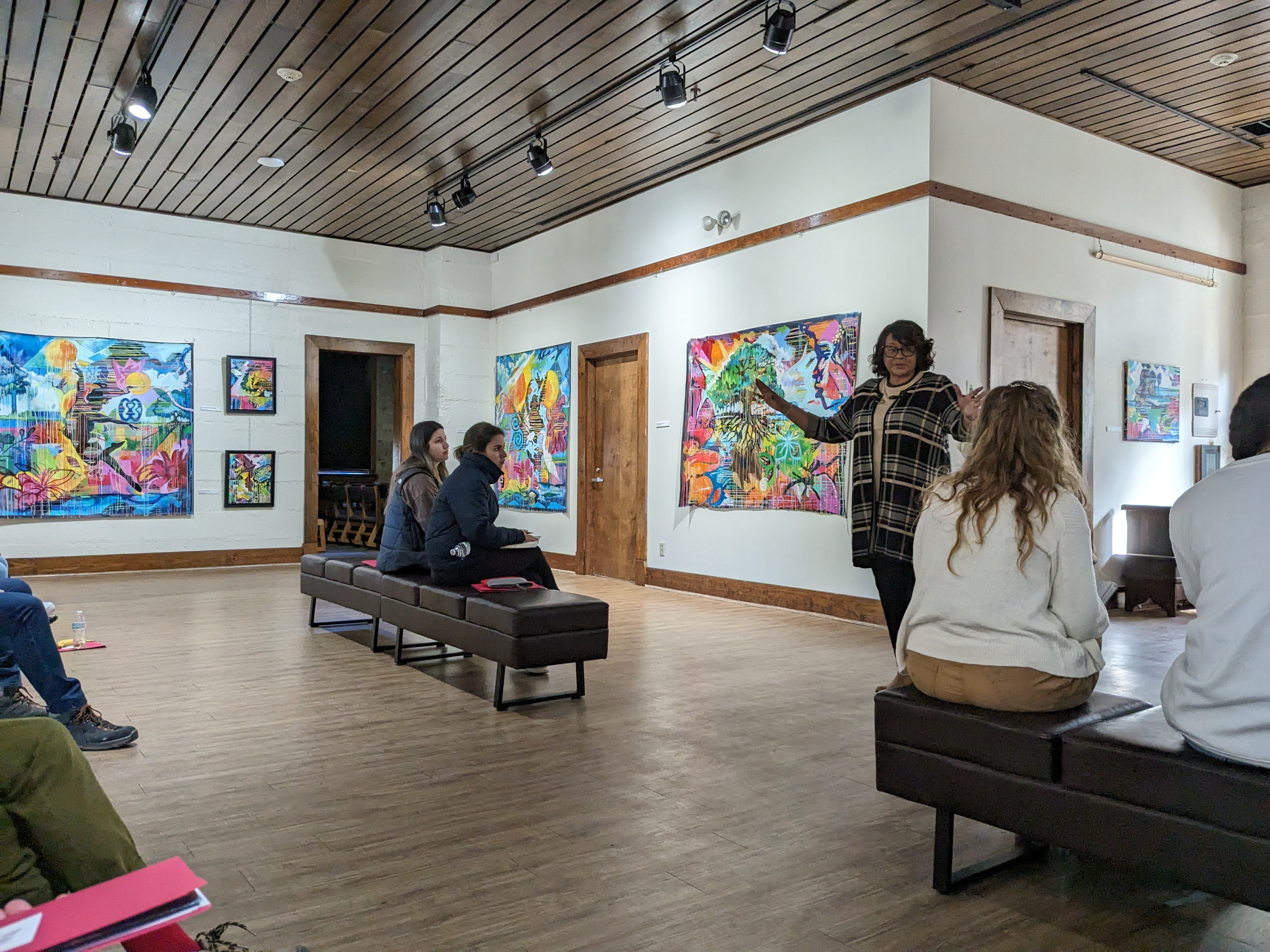
York W. Bailey Museum and Resident Artist Gallery

=== Cope Industrial Shop ===
Originally known as the Boys Industrial Building, The Cope Industrial Shop was built in 1912 following a hurricane after 1911 and financed by the General Education Board as a space for the physical labor industrial and trade classes of Penn School such as black-smithery, basketry, carpentry, cobbling, harness-making, and wheelwrighting. The construction provided relief for Islanders. Cope Industrial Shop is named after Francis Cope who was a Philadelphia Quaker and who served as a trustee to Penn School. The industrial shop was dedicated as Cope on the 50th anniversary of Penn School.

Today, Cope houses the York W. Bailey Museum, which was dedicated in April 1999 in honor of Dr. York W. Bailey who was a graduate of Penn School who studied medicine at Howard University before returning to Saint Helena Island. The museum contains historic artifacts, documents, and photographs related of Penn School and the Sea Islands as well as an resident artist gallery.

=== Emory S. Campbell Dining Hall ===
Originally built for use as a laundry in 1917, and only called "Laundry", it was in the 1940s that the building became a Dining Hall. While still used for Laundry, the female students learned home economics within the building. The original Dining Hall on Penn Center's campus had been abandoned and demolished. With the change, the Laundry eventually bore the name Emory S. Campbell Dining Hall honoring Emory S. Campbell, the executive director of Penn Center from 1980 until 2001. The dining hall was expanded in 1960 and then renovated in 1999.

=== Green Learning Center Rosenwald School ===
Originally known as the Lands End "Rosenwald" School, the school was built in the 1920s via the combined efforts of Saint Helena Islanders and the Rosenwald Fund Committee. The school moved to its current site in 1998. This move was funded by Dennis O. & Katherine F. Green, and the school became known as the Dennis O. & Katherine F. Green Learning Center. The Learning Center is used today by the Program for Academic and Cultural Enrichment (PACE).

=== Butler Building ===
Built in 1931 by students of Penn School, the Butler building commemorated Miss Francis Butler who died shortly after she began her career as a teacher at Penn in 1904. During the 1960s, the Peace Corps and the Conscientious Objectors Program used Butler's second floor to house conscientious objectors of the Vietnam War as they did community service in the place of being enlisted.

Butler Building has also housed the Laura Towne Library which was home to memorabilia and artefacts of Penn School, the Sea Islands, and Gullah Culture. The exterior walkway used to connect the Butler Building to Founders Hall before that building's demolition in 1966.

=== School Buildings Gallery ===
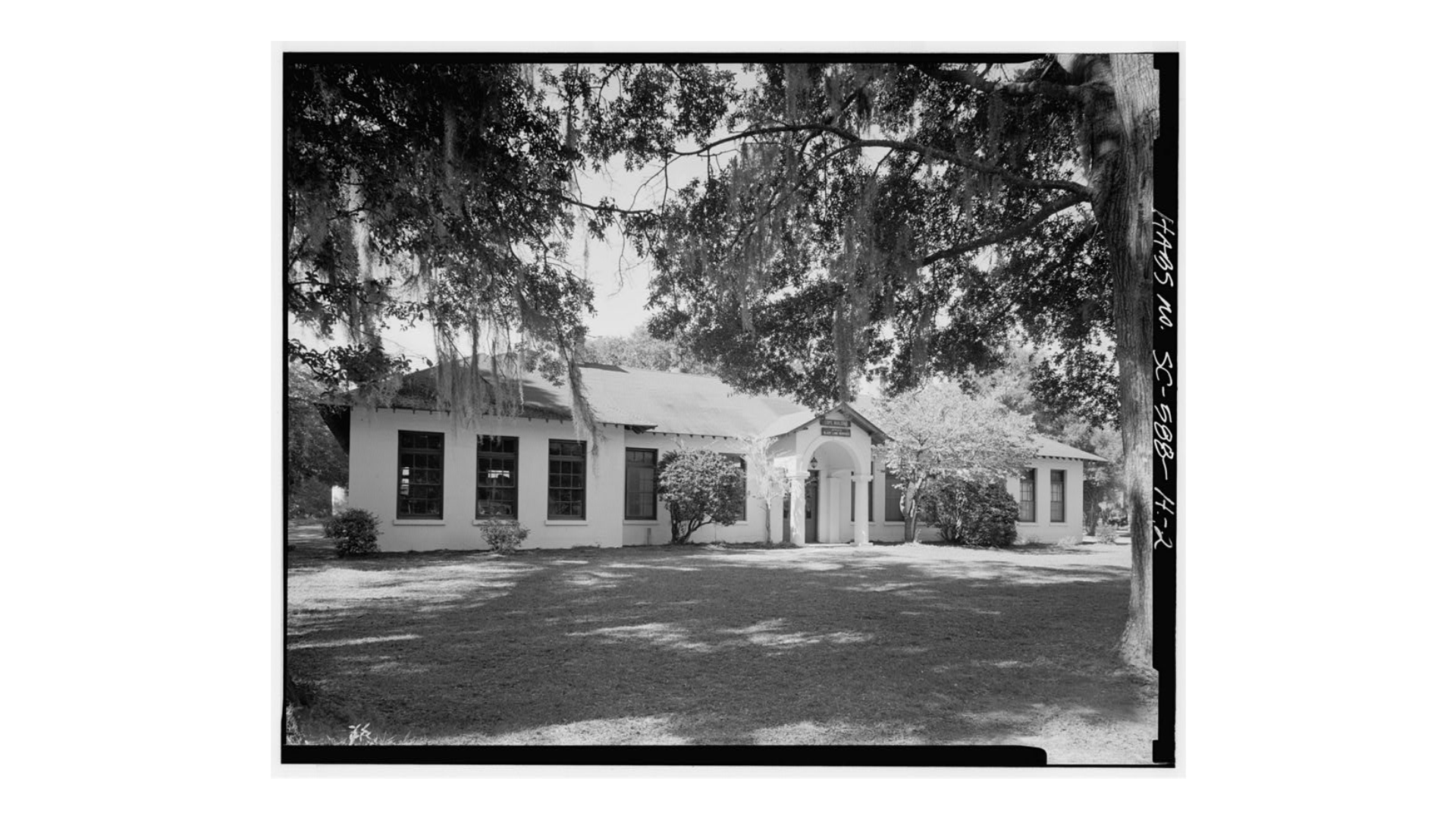
Front Elevation - Cope Building

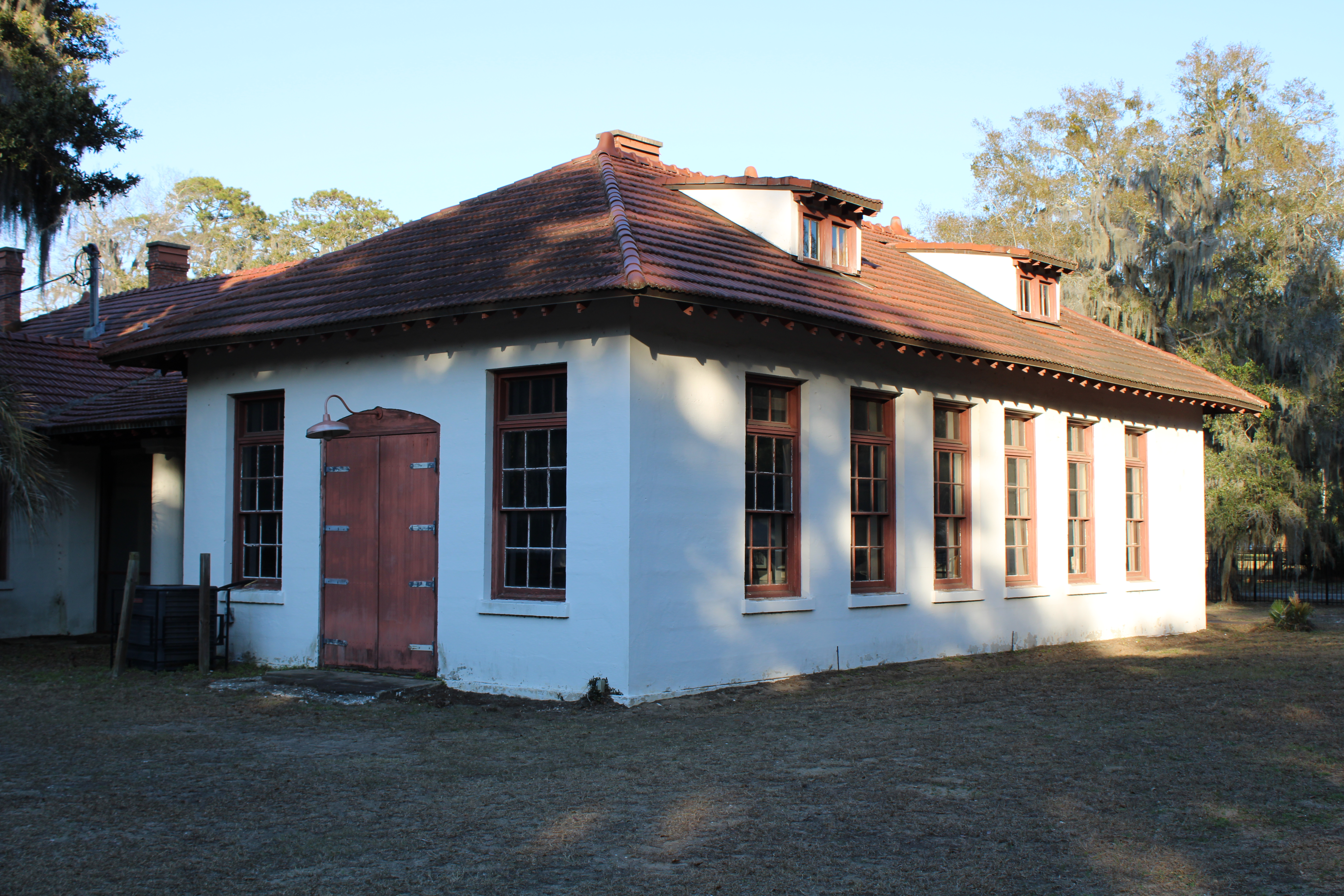
Cope Industrial Building

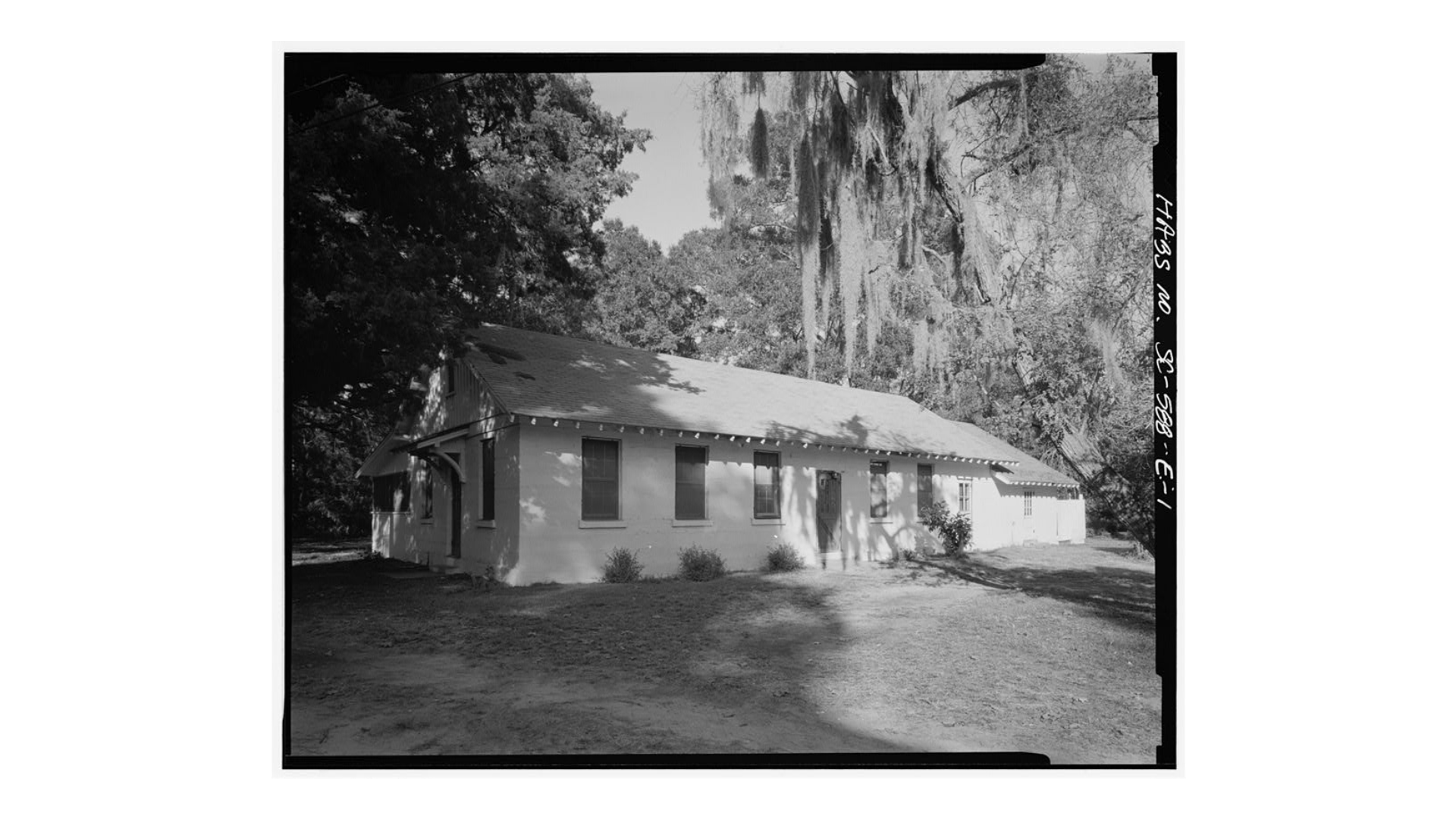
South Side Elevation - Cafeteria

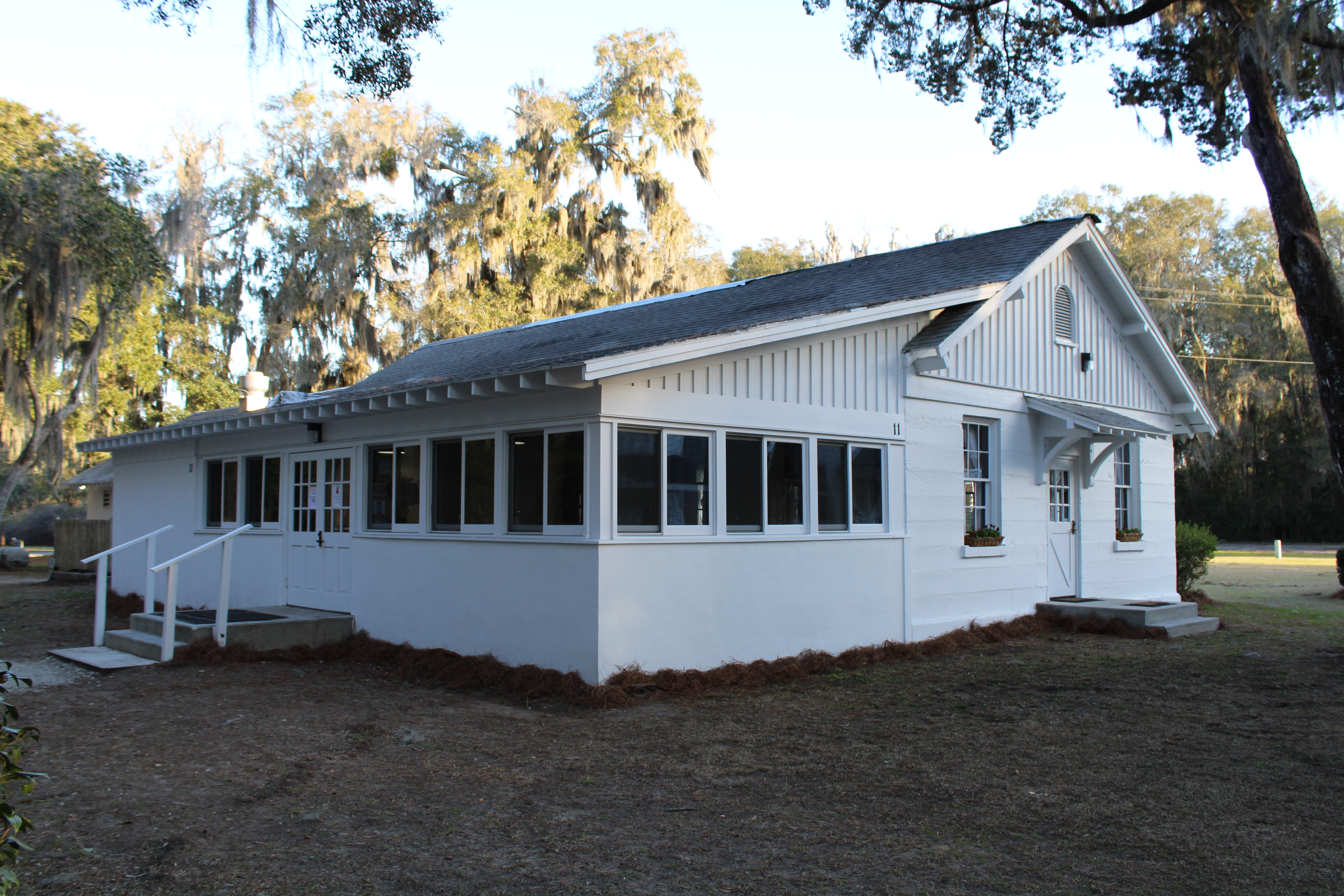
Campbell Dining Hall

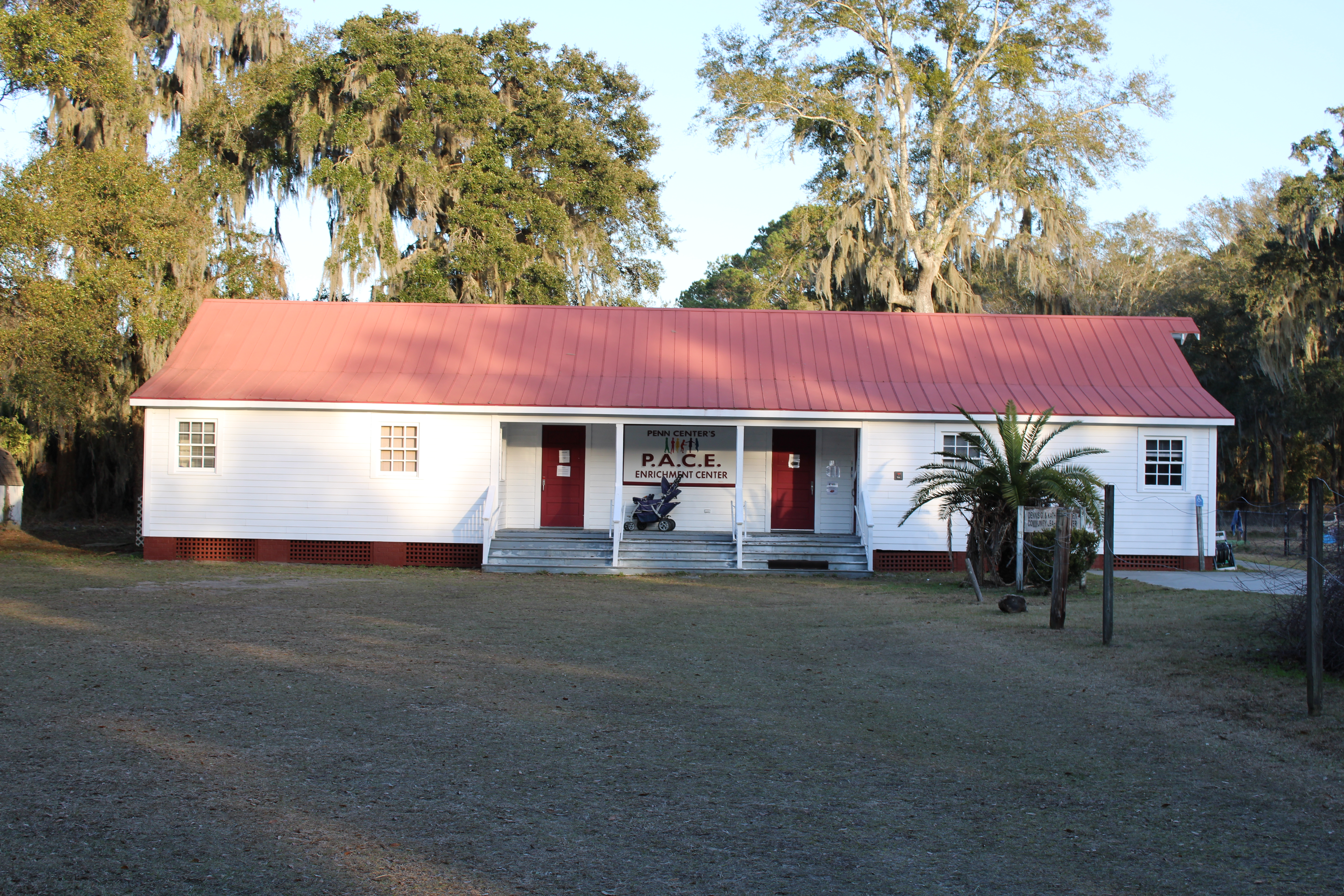
Rosenwald

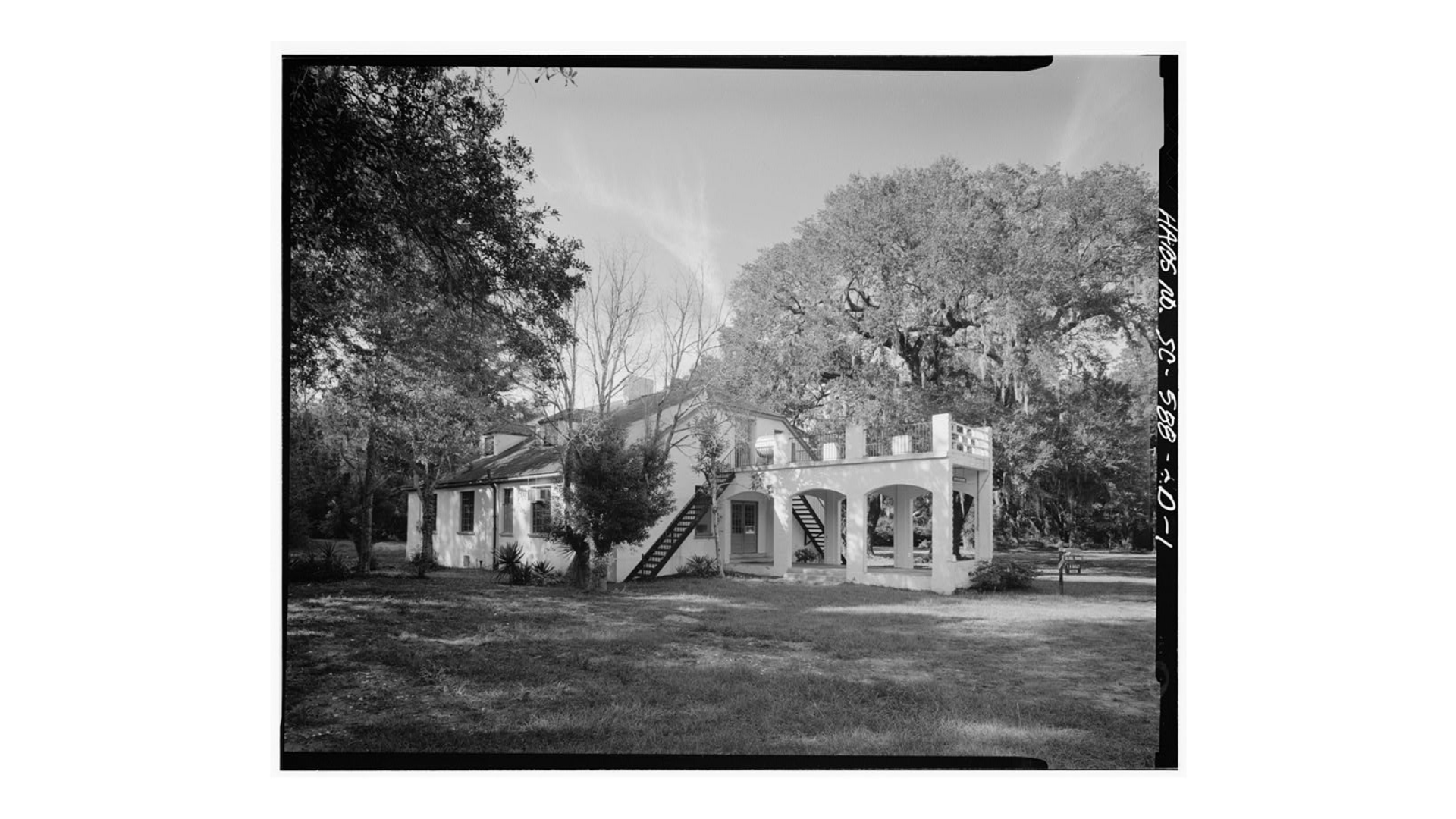
South (front) Elevation - Butler Building

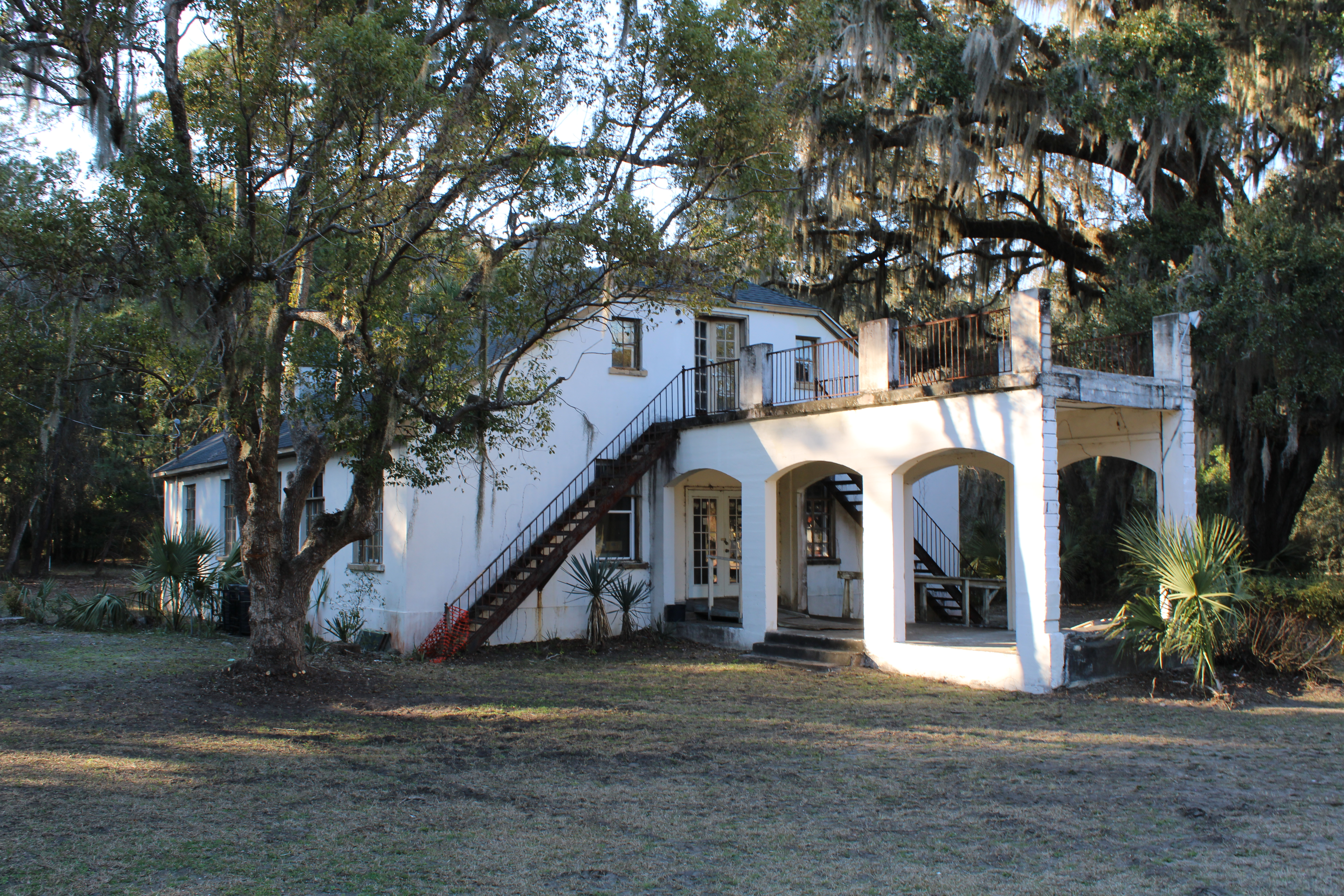
Butler Building

== Community Buildings ==
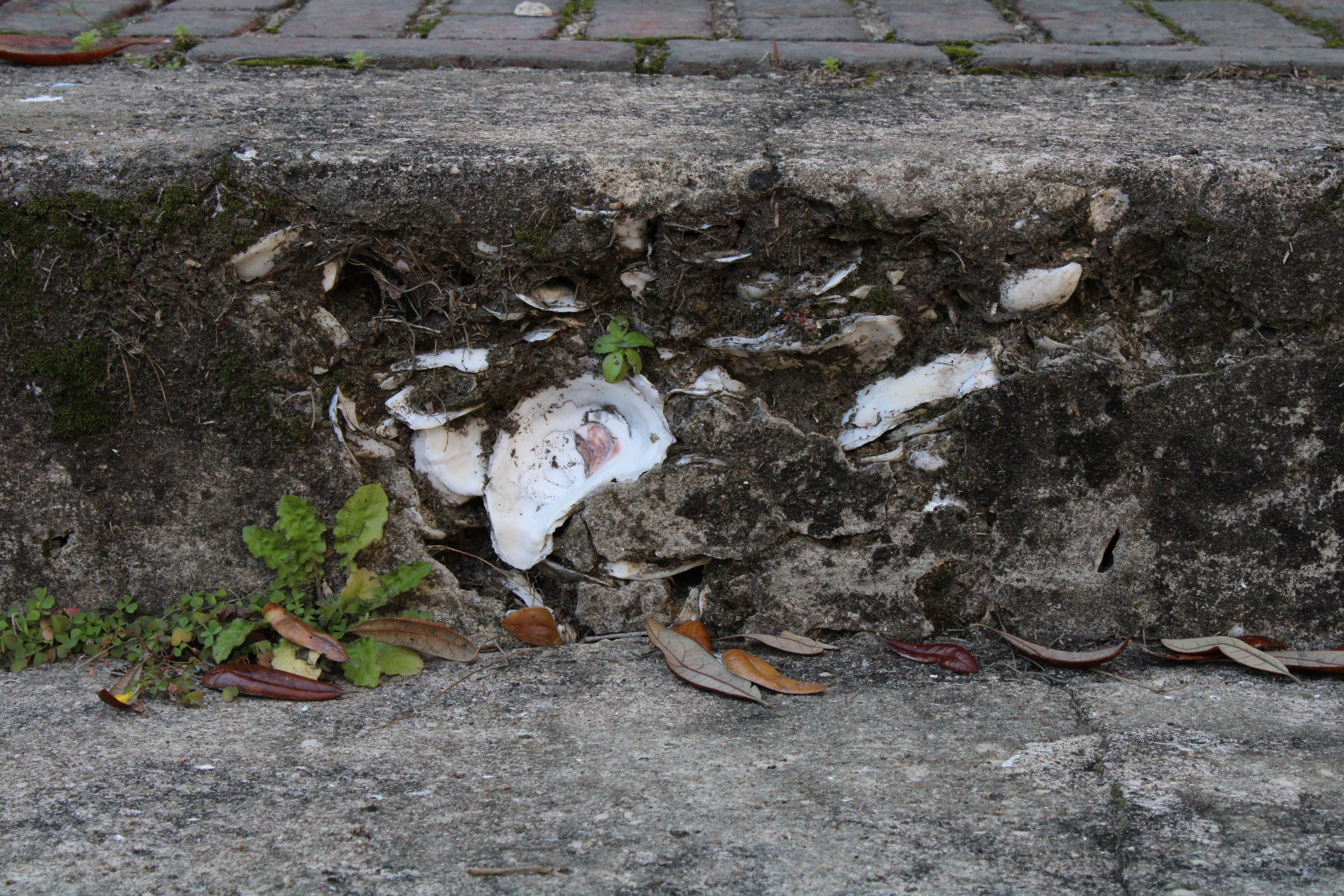
Tabby Construction as seen at Frissell

=== Brick Baptist Church ===
Built in 1855, with a small cemetery next to it, by the enslaved peoples of Saint Helena Island for their masters, Brick Baptist Church in just seven years would come under ownership to the people that built it. Early classes for Penn School were held in Brick Baptist Church by Laura Towne and Ellen Murray, who founded Penn School together, and by Charlotte Forten who was the first African American teacher at Penn School. Brick Baptist Church was utilized as classrooms, despite not being a part of Penn Center's campus today, when Penn School was moving out of Oaks Plantation House due to demand for a larger classroom and into their new school house. Brick Church was dedicated in 2016 as one of the National Reconstruction Era Monuments.

=== Darrah Hall ===
Darrah Hall is the oldest extant building on the Penn Center Campus. It was built in 1903 as a replacement for the 1882 original structure. Funding was provided by Mr. & Mrs. Darrah and was dedicated as a memorial to Sophia Towne Darrah who was the sister of Laura Towne. The original Darrah Hall was used for the community of Penn School and the Saint Helena Island. It was also used by early Penn teachers as the site of the cooking, carpentry, and printing classes and as a library for students. In 1893, the building was used as a shelter during the Hurricane Gracie. It was later in the year of 1893 that the original structure burned down.

The re-built Darrah Hall, still on Penn Center's Campus today, was originally located at the center of the campus. Darrah Hall was rebuilt with the efforts of Mrs. Towne who raised money among the people of Saint Helena Island, and was used for several purposes such as a tomato packing house and the site of morning exercises.

Darrah Hall was used for many community purposes such as all public meetings, Temperance Meetings, the Farmers Fair, and Community Sings. Darrah Hall was moved to its current site, located behind the Potato House. Since then, Darrah Hall has been used for community purposes such as the farmer's conference, wedding receptions, and even as a basketball court.

By the mid-1970s, the hall was used for storage. In the 1990s, interest in the history of Penn School led to the restoration of Darrah Hall, and Darrah Hall was once again used for community events. Today, Darrah Hall is one of the Reconstruction Era Monuments dedicated in 2016 and under the direction of the National Park Service.

=== Alden Sales House ===
The Sales House, originally a milk house, was constructed about 1916. The original building, Alden Sales House, was built around 1900 and located next to Frissell. Alden Sales House eventually housed a secondhand clothing store. In 1937, the Alden Sales House was torn down and replaced, however neither building now remains. The Alden Sales House located on Penn's campus today was built by students.

=== Frissell Community House ===
The Frissell Community House was built in 1925. It is located on the site of Penn's first School house. The Frissell Community House was named to honor Dr. Hollis Burke Frissell. Dr. Frissell was president of the Hampton Institute in Virginia, and helped change Penn School into the Penn Normal, Industrial and Agriculture School.

Frissell Community House has been used for many different purposes such as a library and a kitchen and dining room for Penn School students who did not live on campus. The House was used for parties, plays, and Community Sings, and even for classes. Frissell was also the site where the Southern Christian Leadership Conference (SCLC) trained and held their strategy meetings with Dr. Martin Luther King, Jr. during the 1960s as well as other civil rights gatherings. Frissell Community House is still used as a gathering place for social activities and meetings for the St. Helena Community.

=== Community Buildings Gallery ===
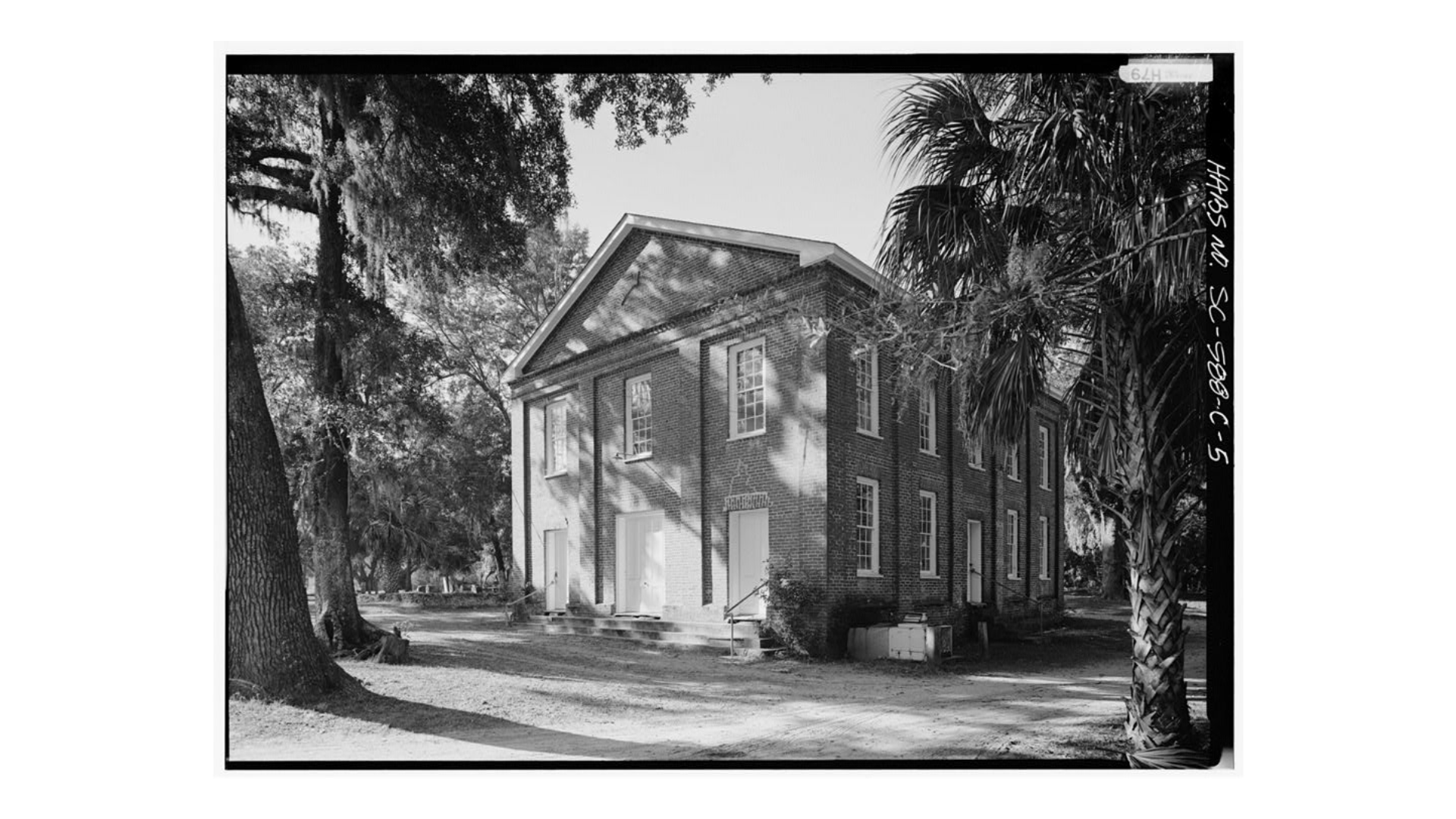
East (front) - Brick Church

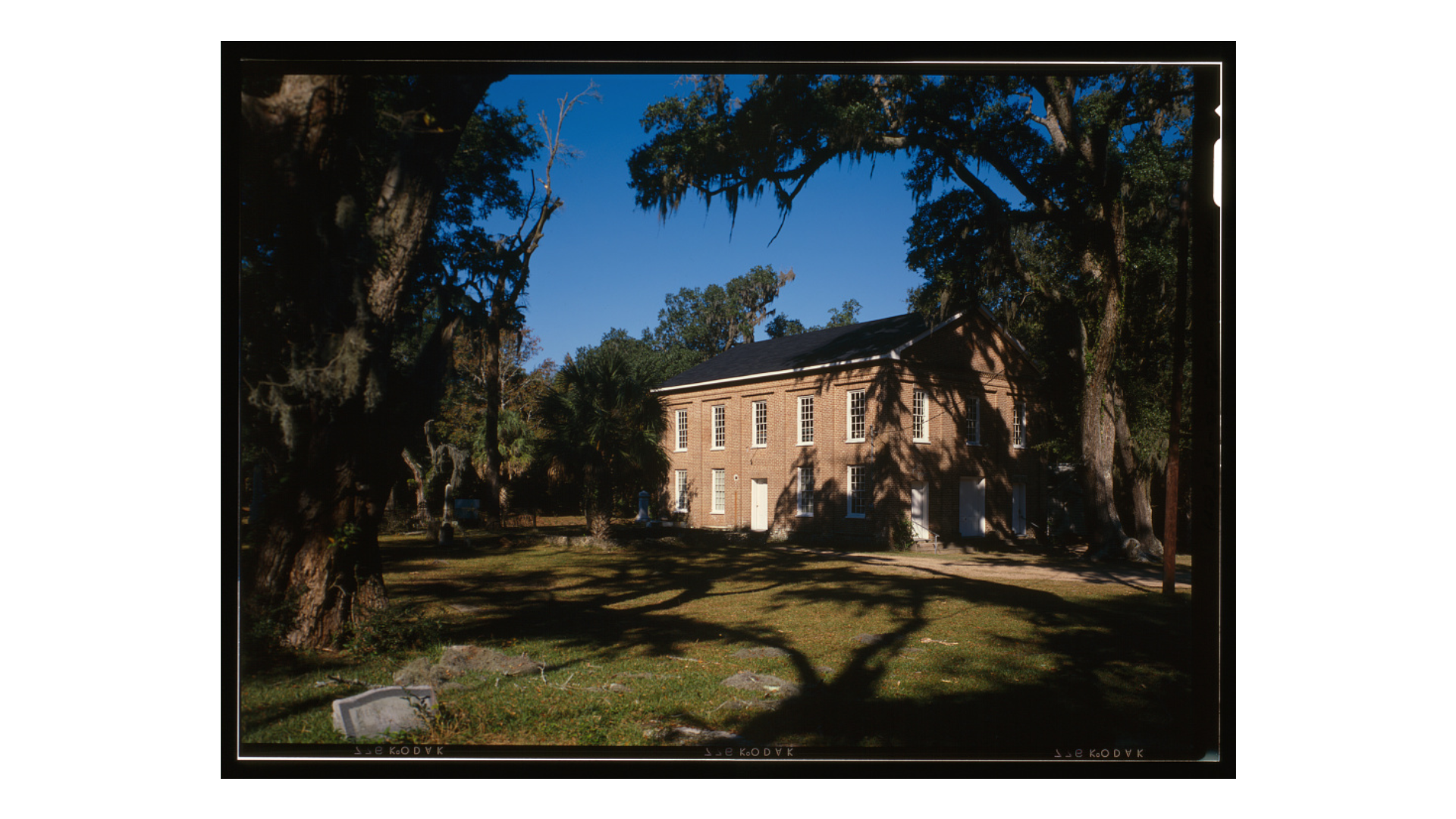
Brick Baptist Church

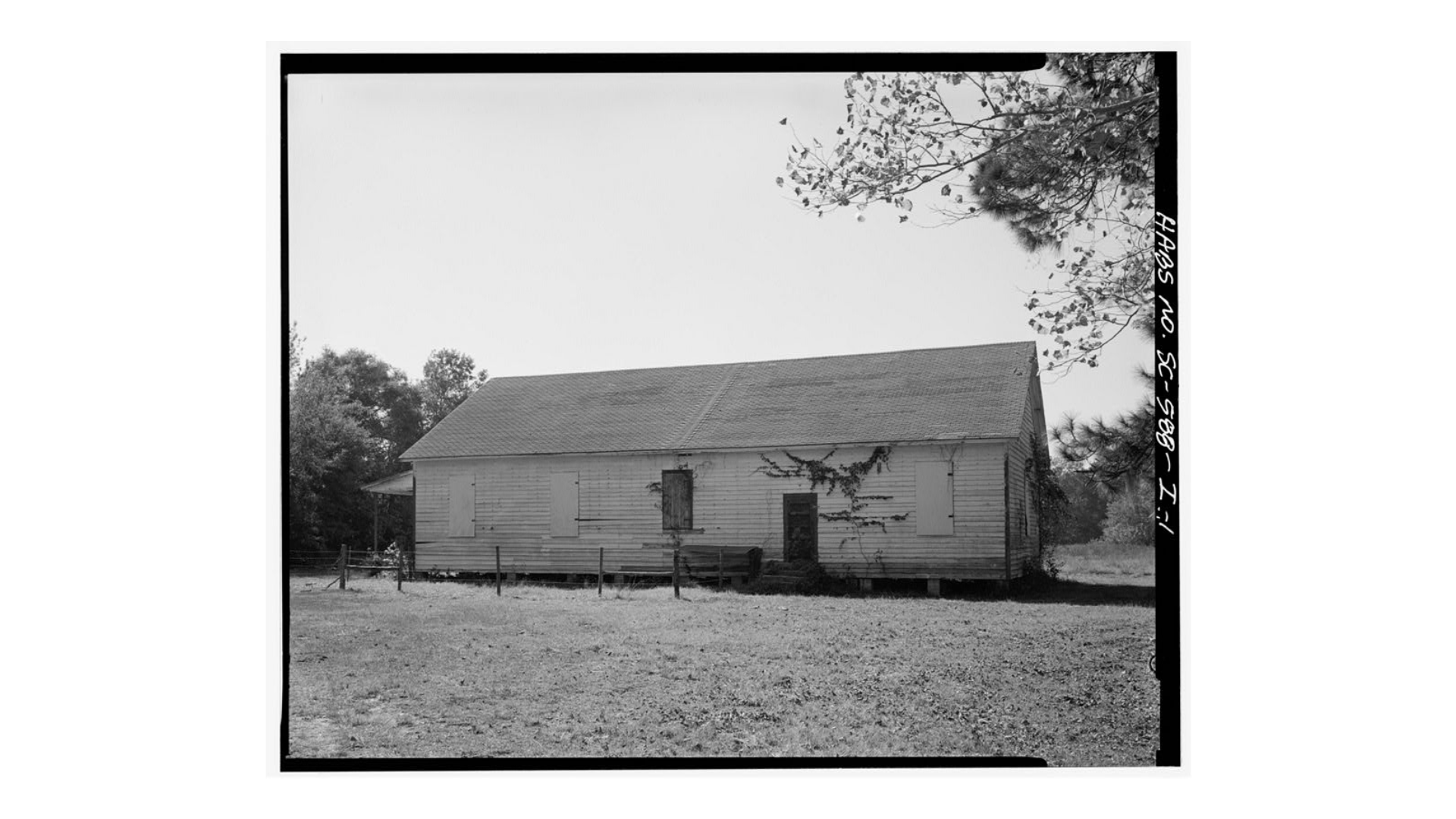
Darrah Building

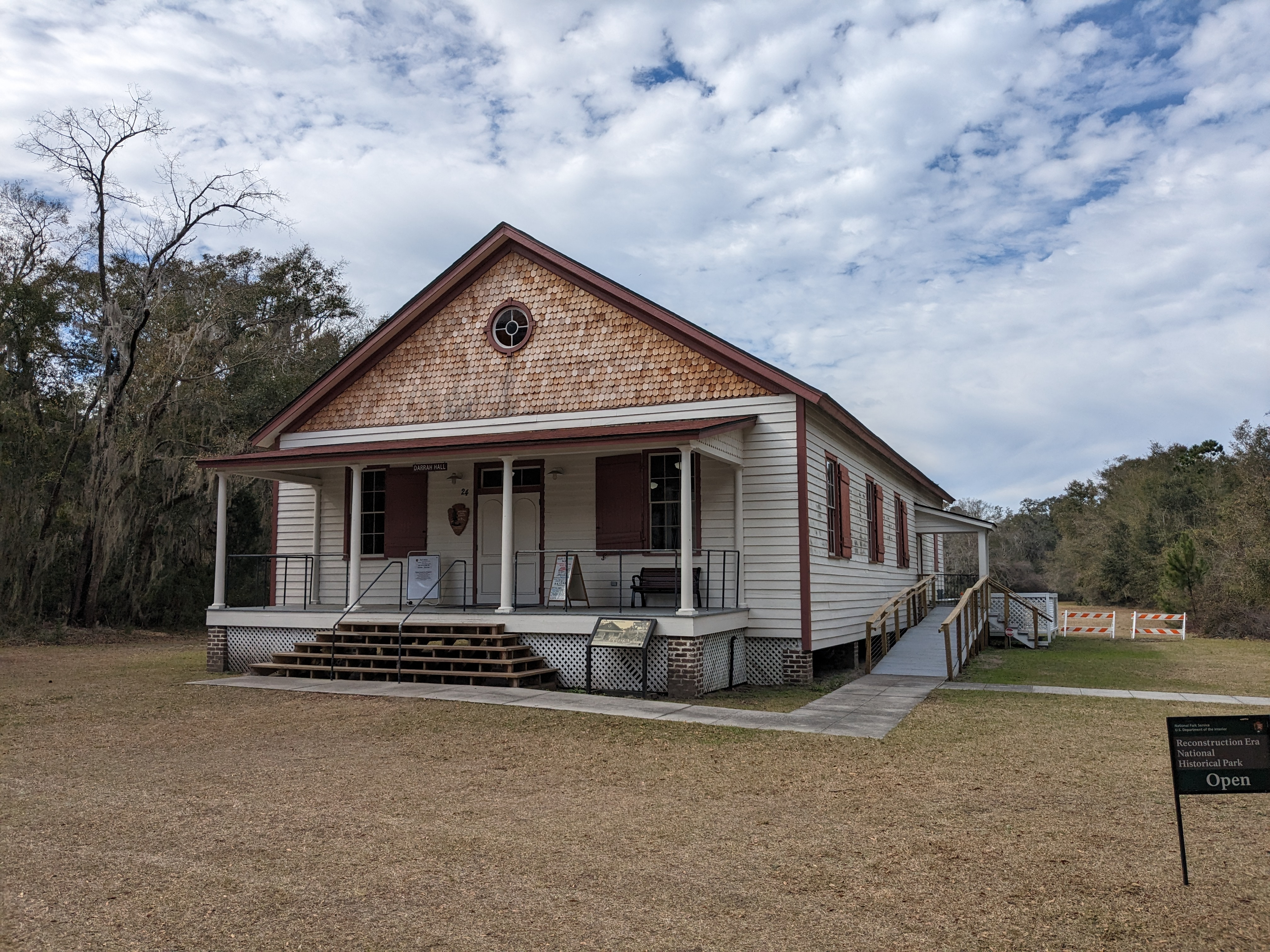
Darrah Hall

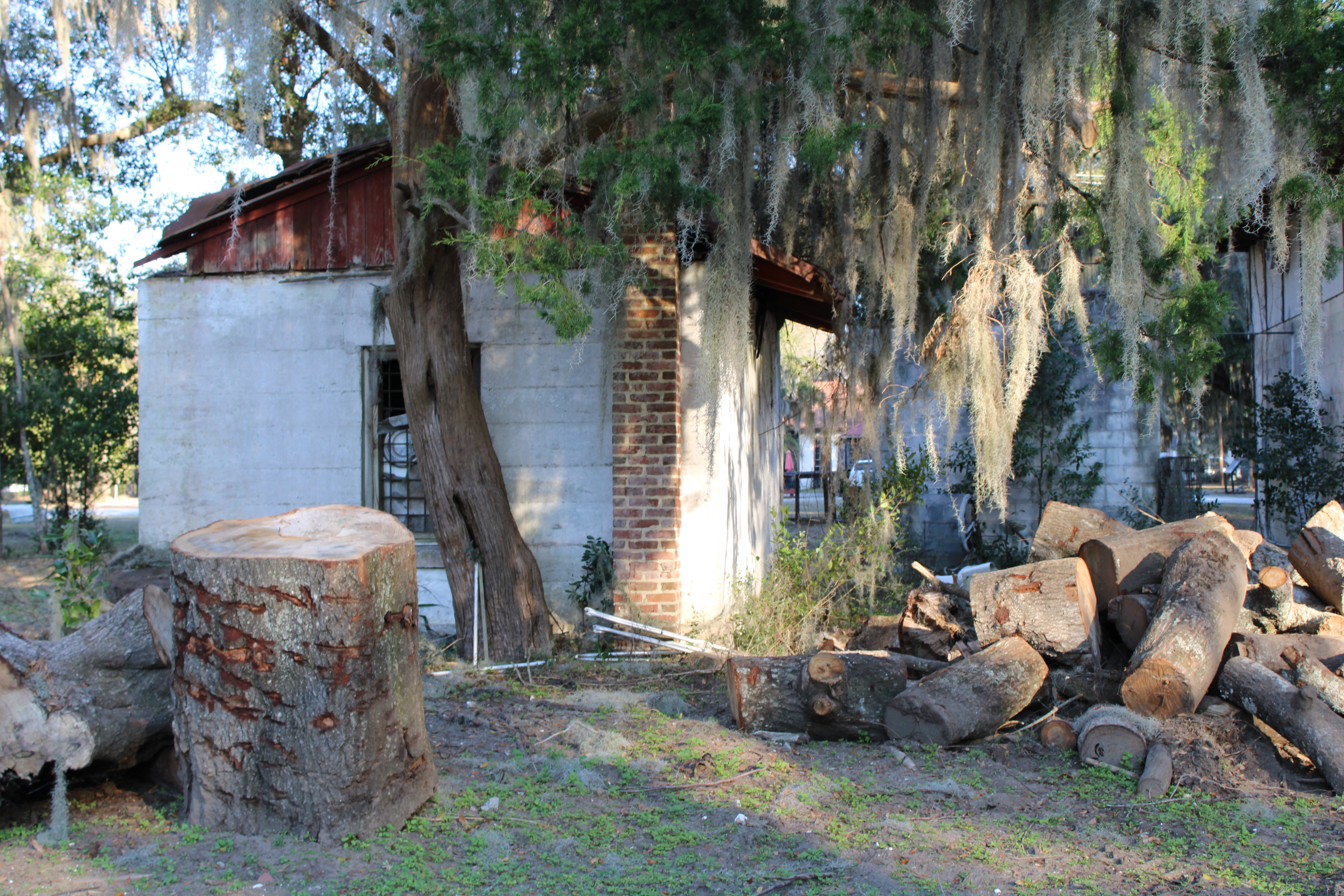
Alden Sales House

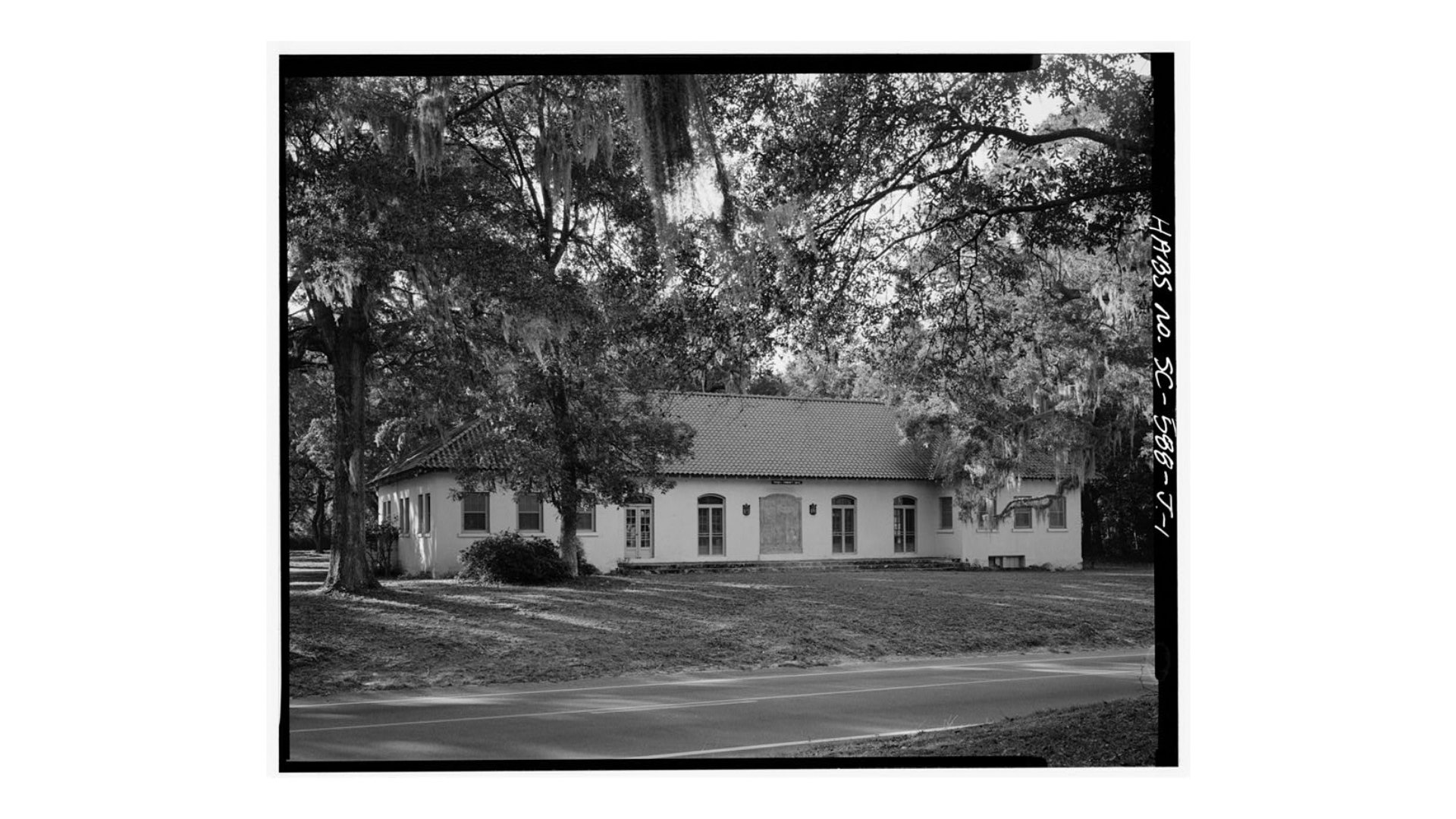
East (front) Elevation - Frissell Community House

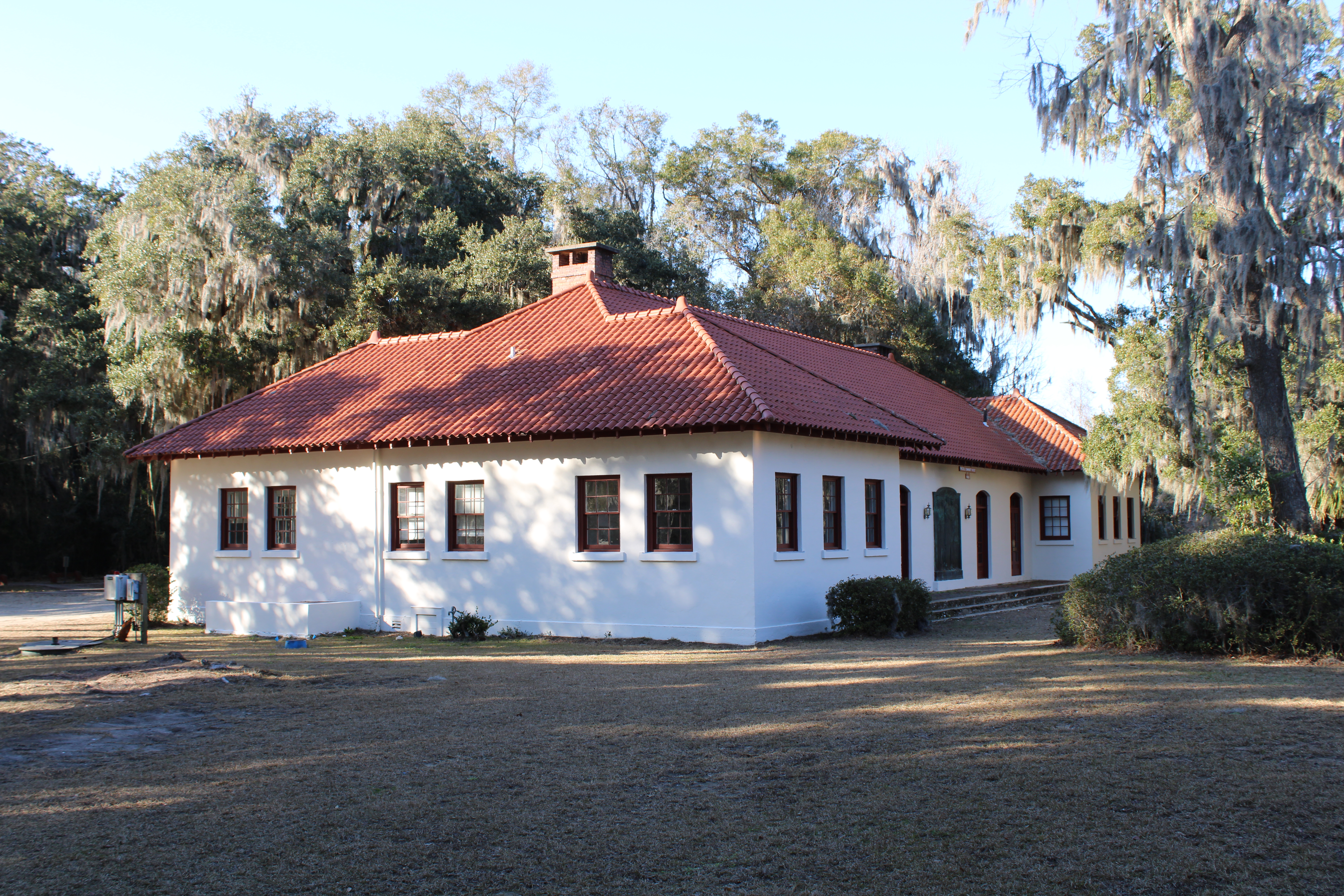
Frissell Exterior

== Farm and Other Buildings ==
=== Bell Tower ===
There are two towers that can be found on Penn Center's Campus, the first of which is the Penn Center Bell Tower. The Bell Tower is located next to the Benezet House and was built in 1865. The Bell tower held a brass bell which was designed after the Philadelphia Liberty Bell at the request of Laura Towne. The Bell was engraved with the inscription, "Proclaim Liberty". The Bell was also held at Founders Hall, moving from the Bell Tower in 1904, before it was moved again when Founders Hall was demolished. The Bell can now be seen on display at the York W. Bailey Museum.

Penn Center's other tower is its water tower completed in 1909 from support from the General Education Board and located behind Brick Baptist Church. The water towers was used to distribute water for Penn School's demonstration farms and provided water to its faculty and students, capable of holding ten thousand gallons of water.

=== The Potato House ===
Built in 1938, the Potato House was used for stacking sweet potatoes so that they could cure. Today, the Potato House is used for storing farm machinery.

=== The Cannery ===
The Cannery, built in 1946, was originally designed as a dairy barn for the purpose of a milking parlor. The students of Penn School mixed and poured the concrete in a method known as Tabby Construction. There, a pure-bred dairy herd was held. During the early 1980s, the Cannery was converted into a tomato canning factory and then used to process Conch by the Coastal Canning Company, while the Silos were used to mix and store livestock feeds. Today, the Cannery is not in use, but the paint imprints of the hands of the Penn Students who built the Cannery can still be seen.

=== Farm and Other Buildings Gallery ===
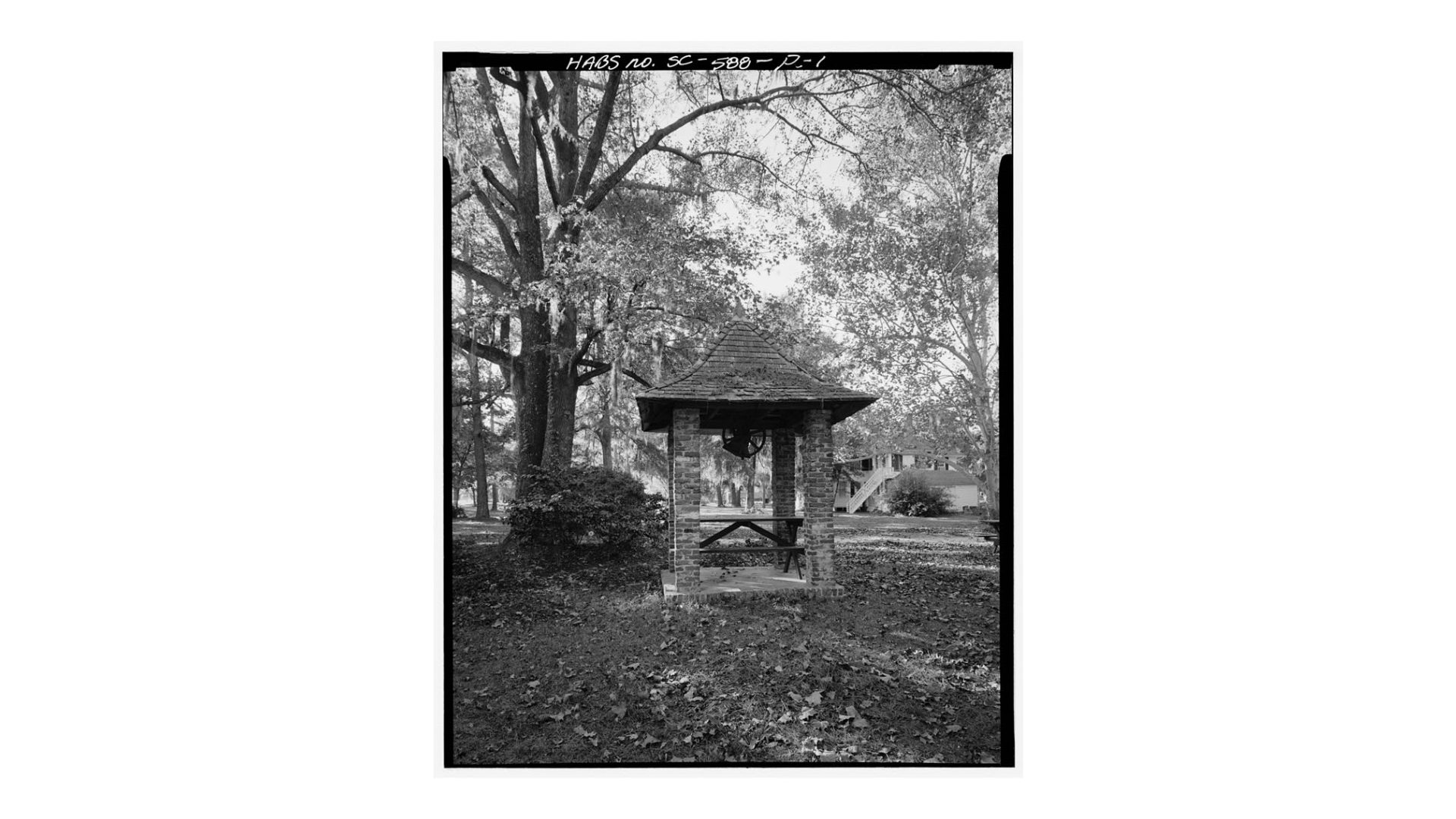
Liberty Bell and Bell Tower

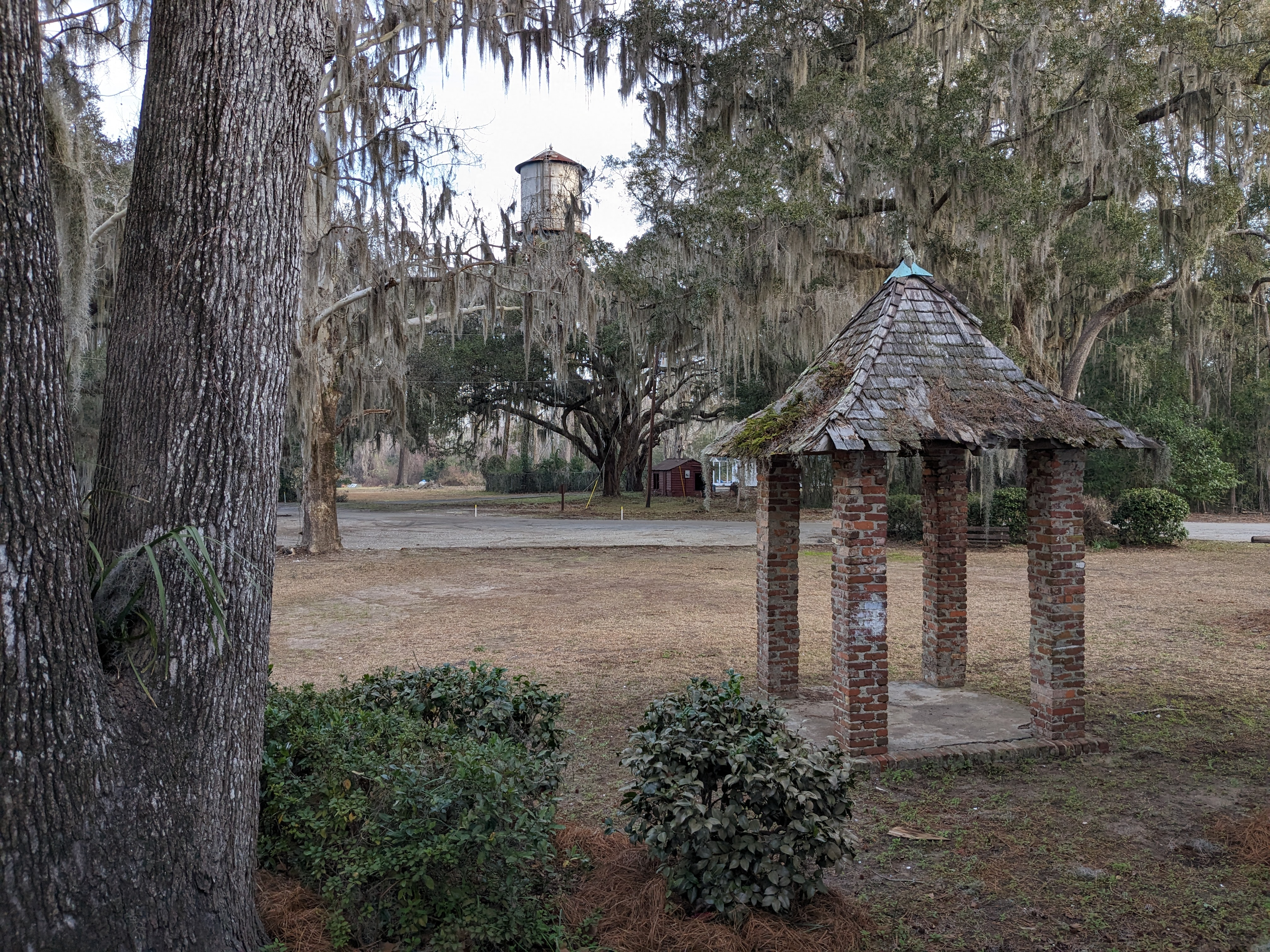
Bell Tower and Water Tower

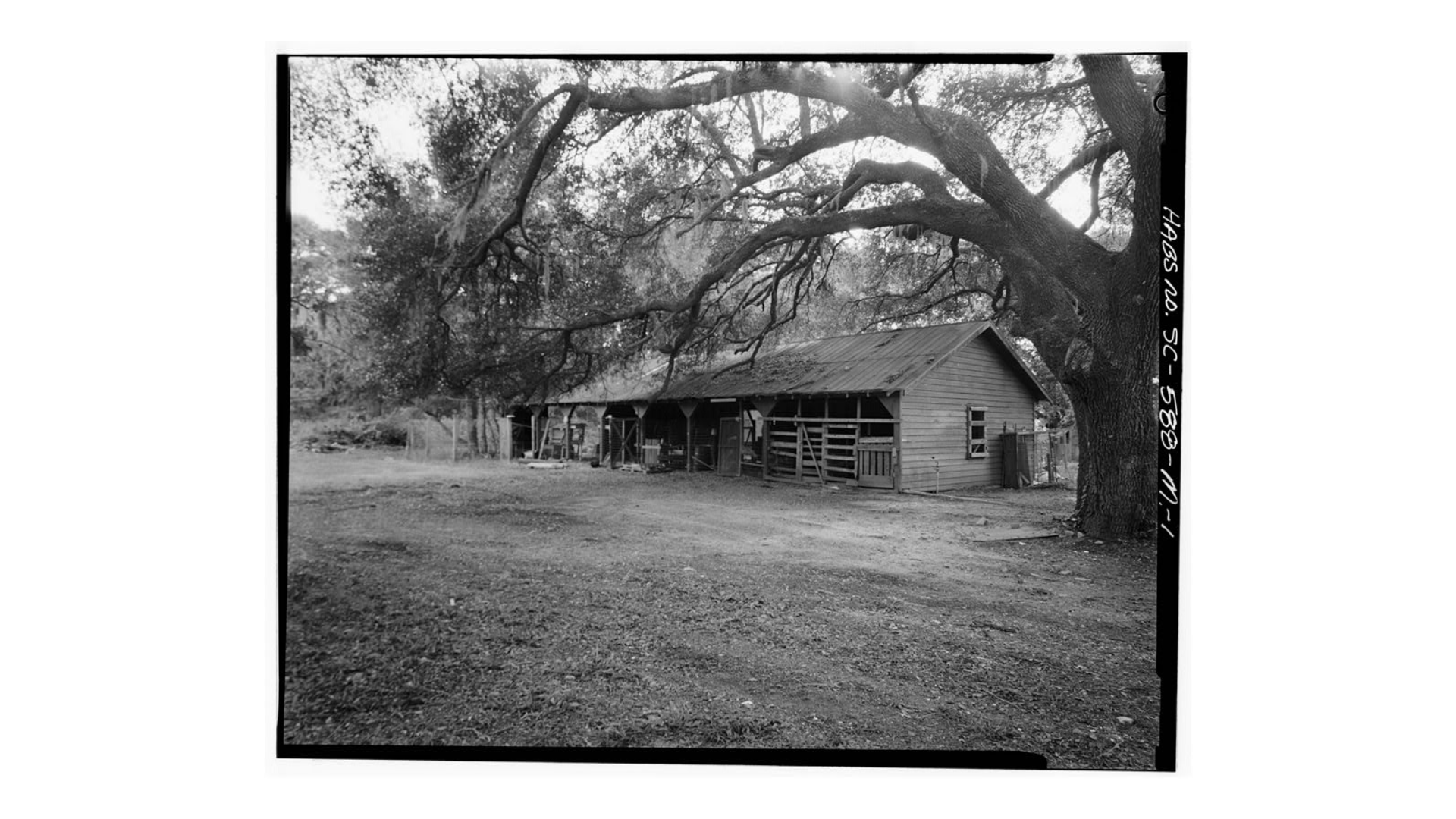
Potato House

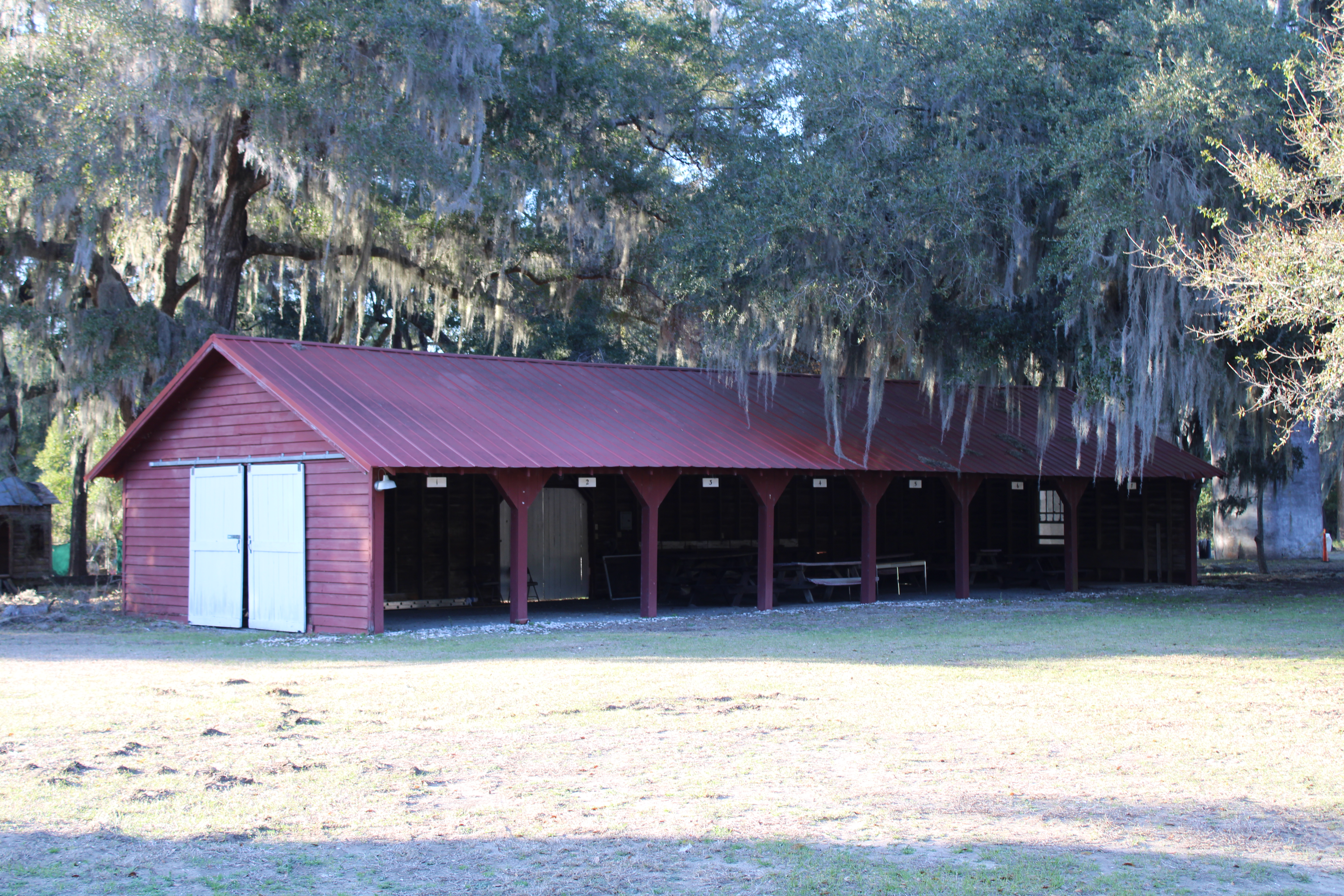
Potato House

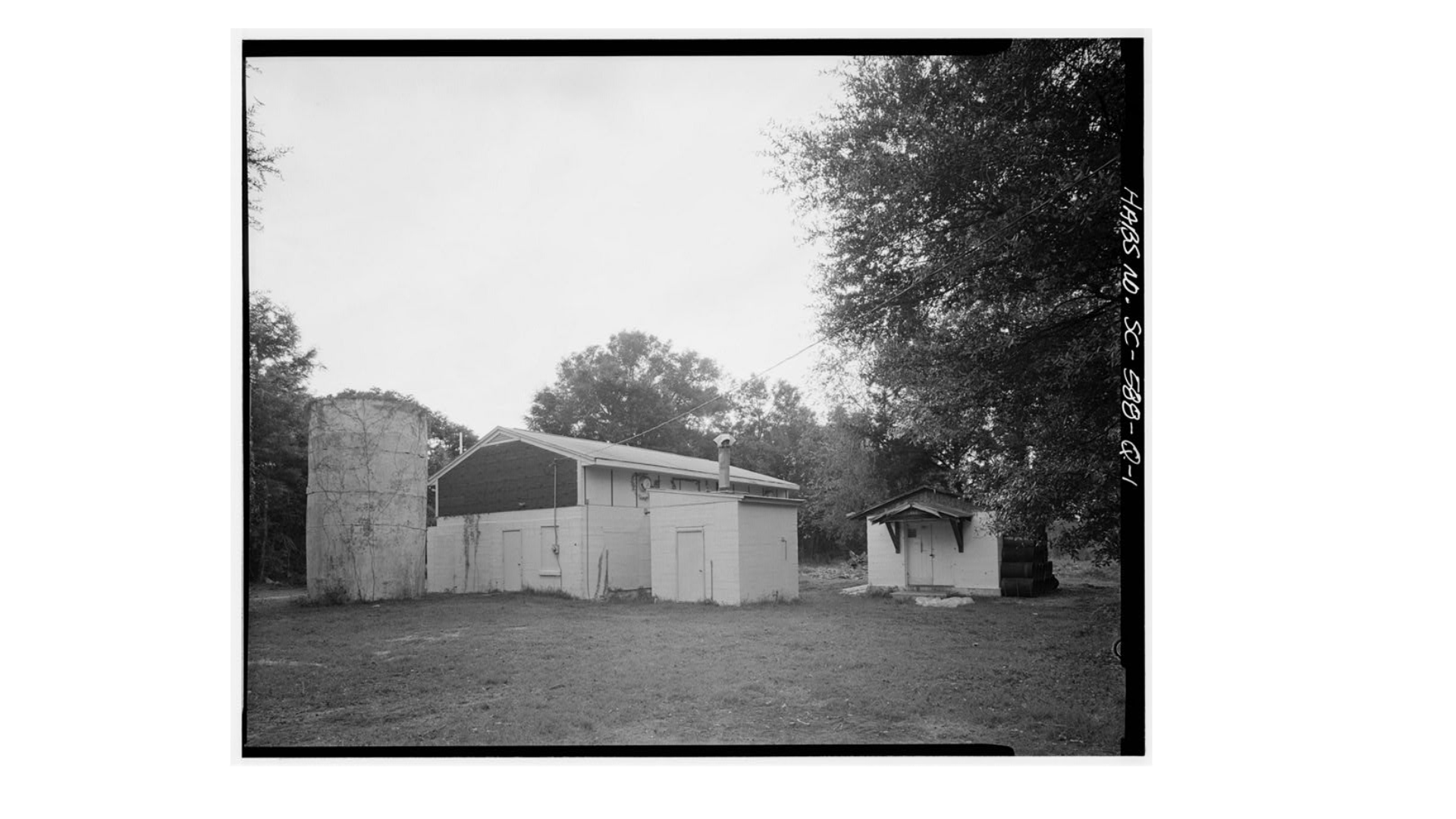
Old Milk Barn

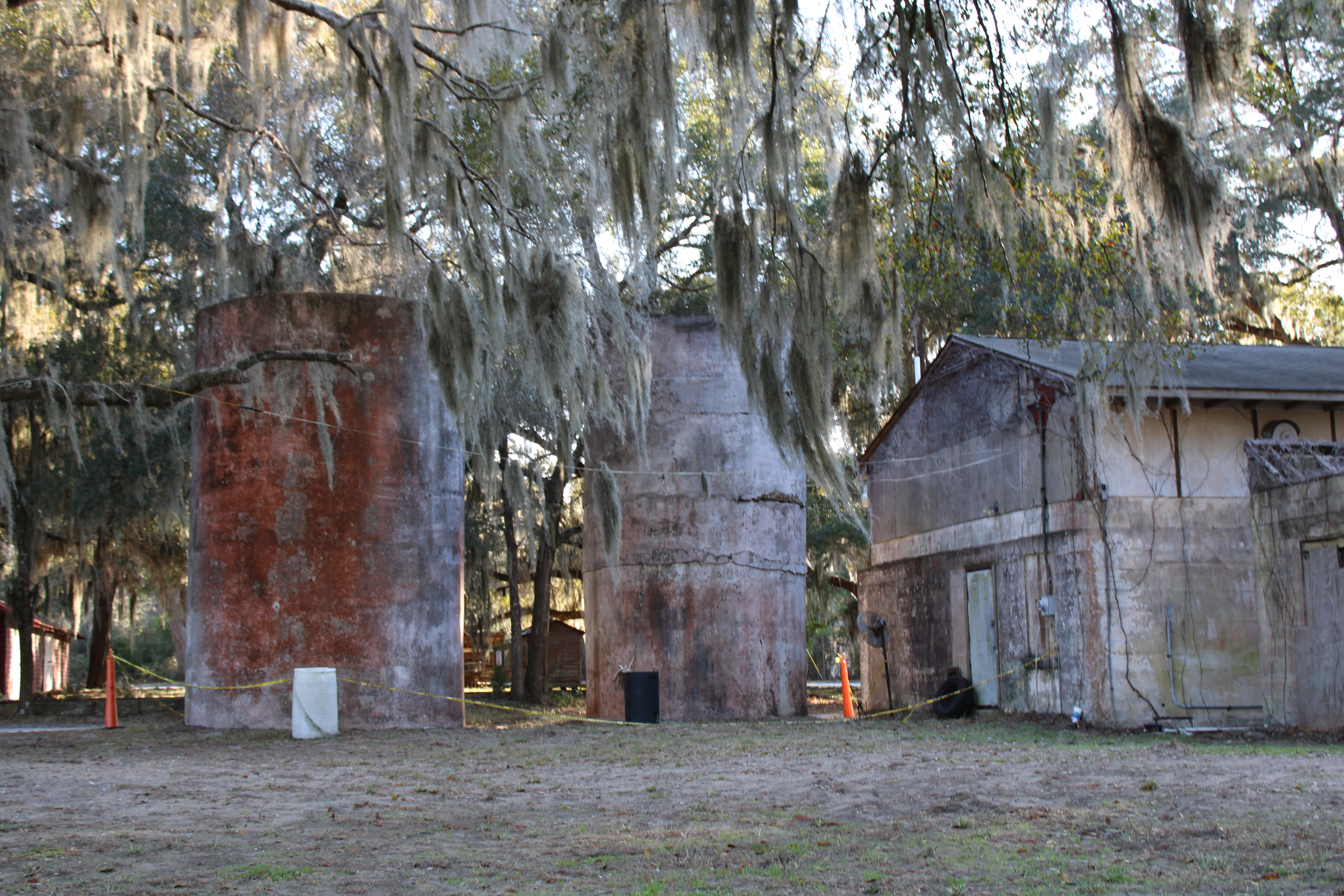
The Cannery

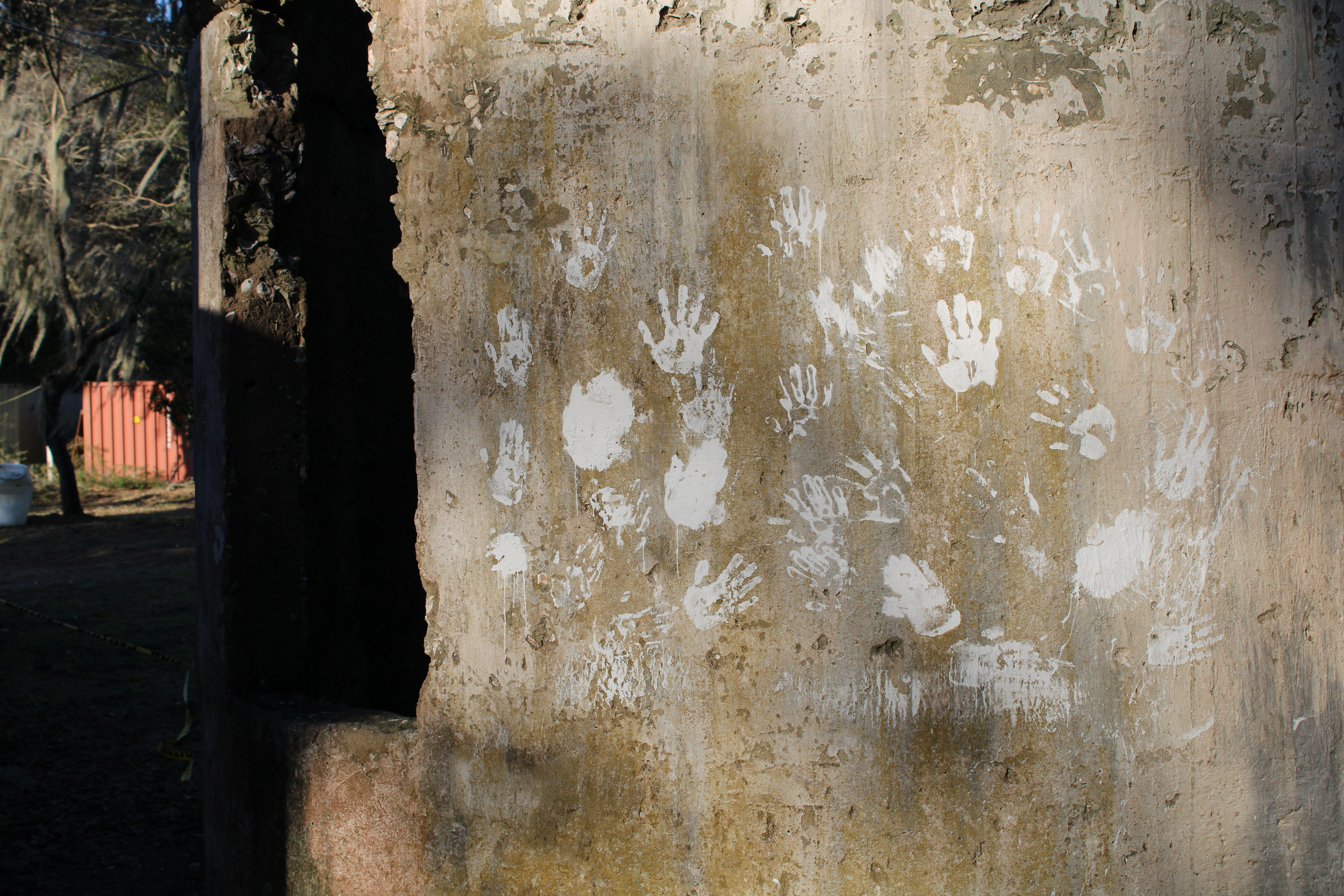
The Cannery and Silo detail

== See also ==
- Reconstruction Era National Monument
- Gullah/Geechee Cultural Heritage Corridor
- List of National Historic Landmarks in South Carolina
- National Register of Historic Places listings in Beaufort County, South Carolina
