= Victory March =

Victory March may refer to:

- Ring shout, a Christian practice associated with the New Birth and Entire Sanctification
- Notre Dame Victory March, the fight song for the University of Notre Dame
