= McIntosh County Shouters =

Ring shout group

The McIntosh County Shouters are a group of traditional Gullah musical performers from the community of Briar Patch in Bolden, Georgia (located in McIntosh County). They have kept the ring shout, one of the oldest continuously practiced African-American traditions, alive.

== Background ==
Music folklorists discovered a group performing Watch Night shouts in 1980. Centered around the Mt. Calvary Baptist Church, these people were descended from former slaves London and Amy Jenkins, who passed down the ring shout tradition.

Smithsonian Folkways released recordings of their performances in 1984 on Slave Shout Songs from the Coast of Georgia, and again in 2017 on Spirituals and Shout Songs from the Georgia Coast.

Founding member Lawrence McKiver (born April 1915) died in 2013. He is credited as a major factor in maintaining the ring shout tradition's continuity.

In 1993, the Shouters received a National Heritage Fellowship from the National Endowment for the Arts.
