= Gullah =

African American ethnic group in the Southern United States

Geechee; Gullah–Geechee
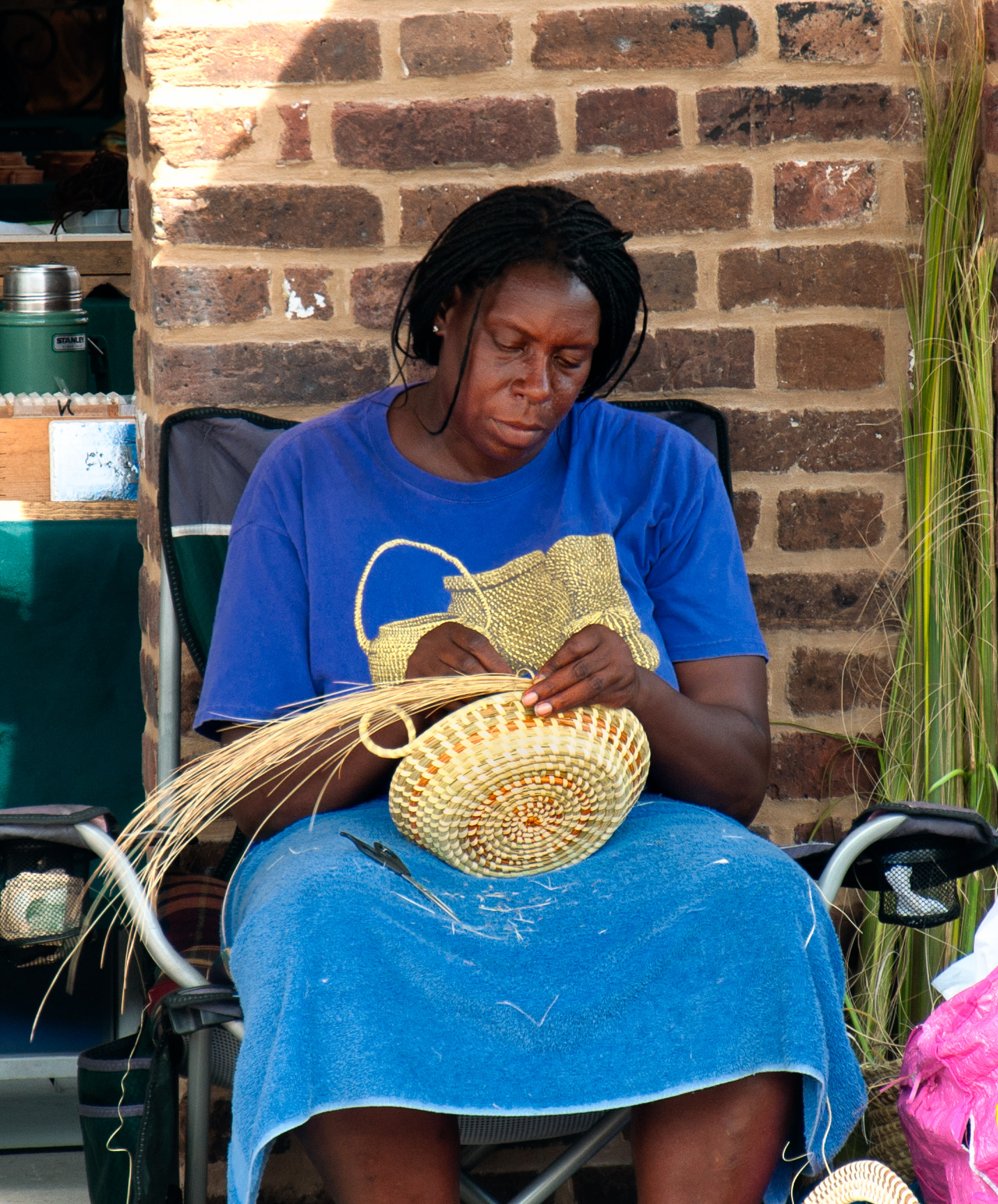
- A Gullah woman makes a sweetgrass basket in Charleston's City Market

Total population
- 200,000

Regions with significant populations
- North Carolina • South Carolina • Georgia • Florida

Languages
- English (Southern American English, African-American English); Gullah

Religion
- Majority Protestant; minorities Roman Catholic and Hoodoo

Related ethnic groups
- African Americans, Afro-Bahamians, Afro-Trinidadians, Haitians, West Africans, Black Seminoles

Gullahs (/ˈɡʌlə/), also known in some areas as Geechees and alternatively as Gullah–Geechees, are an African American ethnic group rooted in the coastal areas of the U.S. states of North Carolina, South Carolina, Georgia and Florida from roughly Pender County, North Carolina to St. Augustine, Florida. Gullahs are descendants of people from West Africa and Central Africa who were enslaved on plantations in the islands, waterways and coasts of this area, now designated the Gullah-Geechee Cultural Heritage Corridor. They have developed a distinctive culture and creole language, also known as Gullah, which have preserved a high volume of Africanisms as a result of their historical geographic isolation.

The Gullahs of the area of Savannah, Georgia are also known as Geechees (/ˈɡiː.tʃi/). The name may be derived from the Kissi people of Sierra Leone, which is the common belief among Gullah-Geechee people. The Georgia communities are distinguished by identifying as either "Freshwater Geechee" or "Saltwater Geechee", depending on whether they live on the mainland or the Sea Islands.

Having gone through a period of relative isolation from whites while working on large plantations in rural areas, Gullahs, who came from a variety of Central and West African ethnic groups, developed a creole culture that preserved much of their African linguistic and cultural heritage; in addition, they absorbed new influences from the region. Their language, an English-based creole, contains many African loanwords and has been influenced by African languages in grammar and sentence structure. Gullah crafts, farming and fishing traditions, folk beliefs, music, rice-based cuisine and story-telling traditions all exhibit strong influences from Central and West African cultures.

== Etymology ==
The origin of the word Gullah can be traced to the Kikongo language of the Congo River basin, from which many Gullah words spoken by Black Americans today come. Some scholars suggest that it may be cognate with the name Angola, where the ancestors of many of the Gullah people originated. Shipping records from the Port of Charleston revealed that Angolans accounted for 39% of all enslaved Africans shipped to the port. The story of Gullah Jack, an enslaved African man who was trafficked from Angola to the United States, further supports the theory that the word Gullah has an origin in Angola.

Some scholars also have suggested that it may come from the name of the Gola, an ethnic group living in the border area between present-day Sierra Leone and Liberia in West Africa, another area of enslaved ancestors of the Gullah people.

The name Geechee, another common name for the Gullah, may derive from the name of the Kissi people, an ethnic group living in the border area between Sierra Leone, Guinea, and Liberia. Another theory derives it from the name of the Ogeechee River in Georgia.

== History ==
=== Origin of the Gullah–Geechee people ===
According to Port of Charleston records, enslaved Africans shipped to the port came from the following areas: Angola (39%), Senegambia (20%), the Windward Coast (17%), the Gold Coast (13%), Sierra Leone (6%), the Bight of Benin and Bight of Biafra (5% combined), Madagascar and Mozambique.

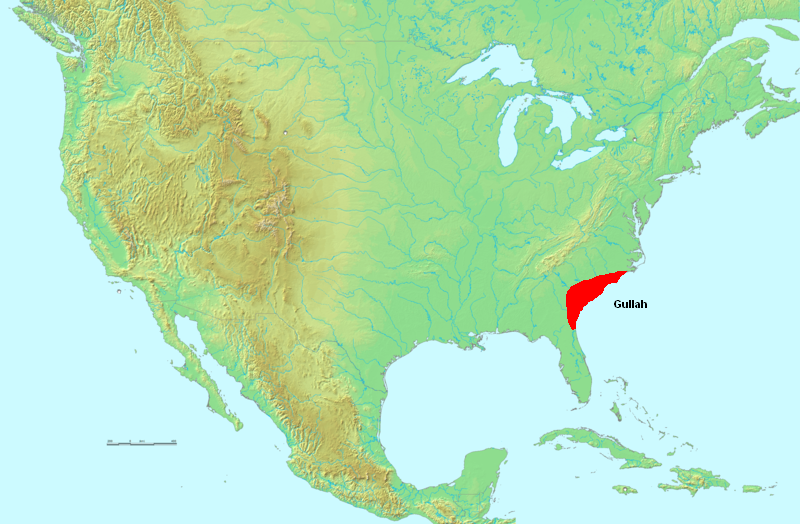
The Gullah region once extended from SE North Carolina to NE Florida

The Gullah people have been able to preserve much of their African cultural heritage because of climate, geography, cultural pride, and patterns of importation of enslaved Africans and Indigenous People. The peoples who contributed to Gullah culture included the Bakongo, Mbundu, Vili, Yombe, Yaka, Pende, Mandinka, Kissi, Fulani, Mende, Wolof, Kpelle, Temne, Limba, Dyula, Susu, Vai, Guale, and the Serer ethnoreligious group and nation from the Senegambia region known for their mixed-farming and fishing expertise. Sapelo Island, the site of the last Gullah community of Hog Hammock, was also a principal place of refuge for Guale people who fled slavery on the mainland.

In 1670, the first English-speaking community was founded on South Carolina's coast. The colonists had little success for the first thirty years, but during the 1700s, they learned that rice, which was brought from Asia, thrived in the Low Country's interior valley swamps. Rice cultivation had a major role in South Carolina's economy during the 1700s. The colony grew and prospered as a result of this product's steady high pricing in England. One of the wealthiest colonies in North America was South Carolina, and its capital and main port, Charlestown (now Charleston), was one of the most affluent and stylish towns in early America. The rice plantation system was later extended farther south to coastal Georgia, where it also flourished, as a result of South Carolina's remarkable success.

Despite their initial lack of knowledge about rice farming, the South Carolina planters quickly realised the benefits of bringing in slaves from West African regions known for producing rice. As a result, compared to planters in other North American colonies, they were generally significantly more interested in the geographic origins of African slaves. Slave dealers in Africa quickly discovered that South Carolina was a particularly lucrative market for slaves from the "Rice Coast," "Windward Coast," "Gambia," and "Sierra Leone" because the South Carolina rice planters were ready to pay higher rates for these captives. Slave dealers were particular about promoting their own auction posters or newspaper ads when they brought slaves from the rice-growing region to Charlestown. When traders brought slaves from other parts of Africa, such as Nigeria, where rice was not usually farmed, to Charlestown, they frequently discovered that their slaves sold for less. They occasionally had to sail away to a different port since they were unable to sell any slaves at all.

In the end, the colonists from Georgia and South Carolina devised a rice-growing system that heavily relied on the technical know-how and work habits of their African slaves. Slaves on rice farms worked in a line through the fields throughout the growing season, hoeing in time and chanting work songs to stay in sync. In order to separate the grain and chaff, the women "fanned" the rice in big round winnowing baskets after processing it with large wooden mortars and pestles that were nearly comparable to those used in West Africa. It's also possible that the slaves helped build the ditches, banks, and sluices that were utilized on the rice plantations in Georgia and South Carolina. Traditionally, West African farmers have grown dry rice on the slopes and wet rice on the flood plains. Travelers in the 1700s observed that West African farmers, particularly the Temne of Sierra Leone, were building complex irrigation systems for rice farming with the Portuguese introduction of superior varieties of paddy rice from Asia in the 1500s. Enslaved people in South Carolina and Georgia merely carried on using many of the rice-growing techniques they were used to in Africa.

By the middle of the 18th century, thousands of acres in the Georgia and South Carolina Lowcountry, and the Sea Islands were developed as rice fields. African farmers from the "Rice Coast" brought the skills for cultivation and tidal irrigation that made slaveholders wealthy in the Sea Islands. The majority of rice produced in the Lowcountry came from Georgetown County, South Carolina.

Georgia and coastal South Carolina have ideal climates for growing rice, but they also proved to be ideal for the spread of tropical diseases. Yellow fever and malaria were introduced by African slaves, and they flourished on the marshy coastal plain, particularly near the flooded rice plantations. Slaves possessed a certain amount of innate resistance to these tropical illnesses, but their owners were at great risk. When fever broke out in the rainy summer and fall, the white planters abandoned their plantations entirely and shifted their homes away from the rice fields. On a daily basis, a small number of white managers oversaw the plantations with the help of several gifted and reliable slaves who served as foremen or "drivers." Although there were still not many white people in the area, as the rice plantation system grew and produced more and more revenue, more African slaves were imported. South Carolina was unique among the North American colonies in that it had a black majority by 1708. In the 1730s, a European visitor to Charlestown made the observation that "Carolina looks more like a negro country than a country settled by white people."

Compared to slaves in other North American colonies, Gullah slaves in coastal Georgia and South Carolina had radically different living conditions. White people and Gullahs did not interact much. On the rice plantations, they lived in a mainly secluded community, and because of their numbers and isolation, they were able to preserve a wide variety of African traditional customs.

These had hundreds of laborers, with African traditions reinforced by new imports from the same regions. Over time, the Gullah people developed a creole culture in which elements of African languages, cultures, and community life were preserved to a high degree. Their culture developed in a distinct way, different from that of the enslaved African Americans in states such as North Carolina, Virginia, and Maryland, where the enslaved lived in smaller groups, and had more sustained and frequent interactions with whites and British American culture.

In late 2024 underwater sonar was used to map 45 previously unknown irrigation devices used to control water flow for rice fields in conjunction with earthen dams and levees, developed by the Gullah–Geechee over an area of 2,000 acres (800 hectares) of the northern end of Eagles Island, North Carolina, US. This provided evidence of the Gullah–Geechee engineering and technological skills used for rice cultivation.

=== Origins of the Gullah language ===
Linguists refer to the Gullah language as an English-based creole language. When individuals from different backgrounds are put together and forced to develop a single language, creoles emerge in the setting of trade, colonialism, and slavery. One perspective holds that creole languages are basically hybrids that include linguistic elements from many diverse sources. Although the majority of Gullah vocabulary comes from the English "target language," which is the speech of the socially and economically dominant group, the African "substrate languages" have influenced the grammar and sentence structure, changed how nearly all English words are pronounced, and contributed a significant portion of the vocabulary. The Gullah language was mistakenly seen by many early researchers as "broken English," as they were unable to acknowledge the powerful underlying impact of African languages. However, Gullah and other creoles are now considered by linguists to be complete languages with their own systematic grammatical systems. An English-based creole spread from Senegal to Nigeria along the West African coast during the 18th century, when the British controlled the slave trade. In addition to being a lingua franca, or common language, among Africans of various tribes, this hybrid language was used as a communication tool between local African traders and British slave traders. Before leaving Africa, some of the slaves sent to America must have been familiar with creole English, and their speech appears to have served as an example for the other slaves on the estates. Numerous linguists contend that this early form of West African Creole English served as the ancestor of the contemporary English-based creoles in West Africa, such as Nigerian Pidgin and Sierra Leone Krio.

=== Civil War period ===
When the U.S. Civil War began, the Union rushed to blockade Confederate shipping. White planters on the Sea Islands, fearing an invasion by the US naval forces, abandoned their plantations and fled to the mainland. When Union forces arrived on the Sea Islands in 1861, they found the Gullah people eager for their freedom. The Sea Islands were the first place in the South where slaves were freed, as part of a Union-administered "experiment" in transitioning the plantations they found from slave to paid labor. This experiment, with the active participation of formerly enslaved Gullah people, resulted in Gullah land ownership, access to education, and new forms of self-organization as paid workers, several years before broader emancipation. Drawn by news of the transformation underway and by a call from the U.S. government for teachers for the former slaves, abolitionists and missionaries from Northern states traveled to the Sea Islands to start schools for newly freed Gullah people. Penn Center, now a Gullah community organization on Saint Helena Island, was founded by Unitarian missionaries from Pennsylvania as the first school for freed slaves. Union army recruiters on the island also found the Gullah eager to defend their new freedom: many Gullah served with distinction in the Union Army's 1st South Carolina Colored Infantry Regiment.

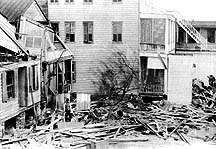
1893 Sea Islands hurricane-damaged houses in Beaufort County.

After the Civil War ended, the Gullahs' isolation from the outside world increased in some respects. The rice planters on the mainland gradually abandoned their plantations and moved away from the area because of labor issues and hurricane damage to crops. Free Black people were unwilling to work in the dangerous and disease-ridden rice fields. A series of hurricanes devastated the crops in the 1890s. Left alone in remote rural areas of the Lowcountry, the Gullah continued to practice their traditional culture with little influence from the outside world well into the 20th century.

=== Since late 20th century ===
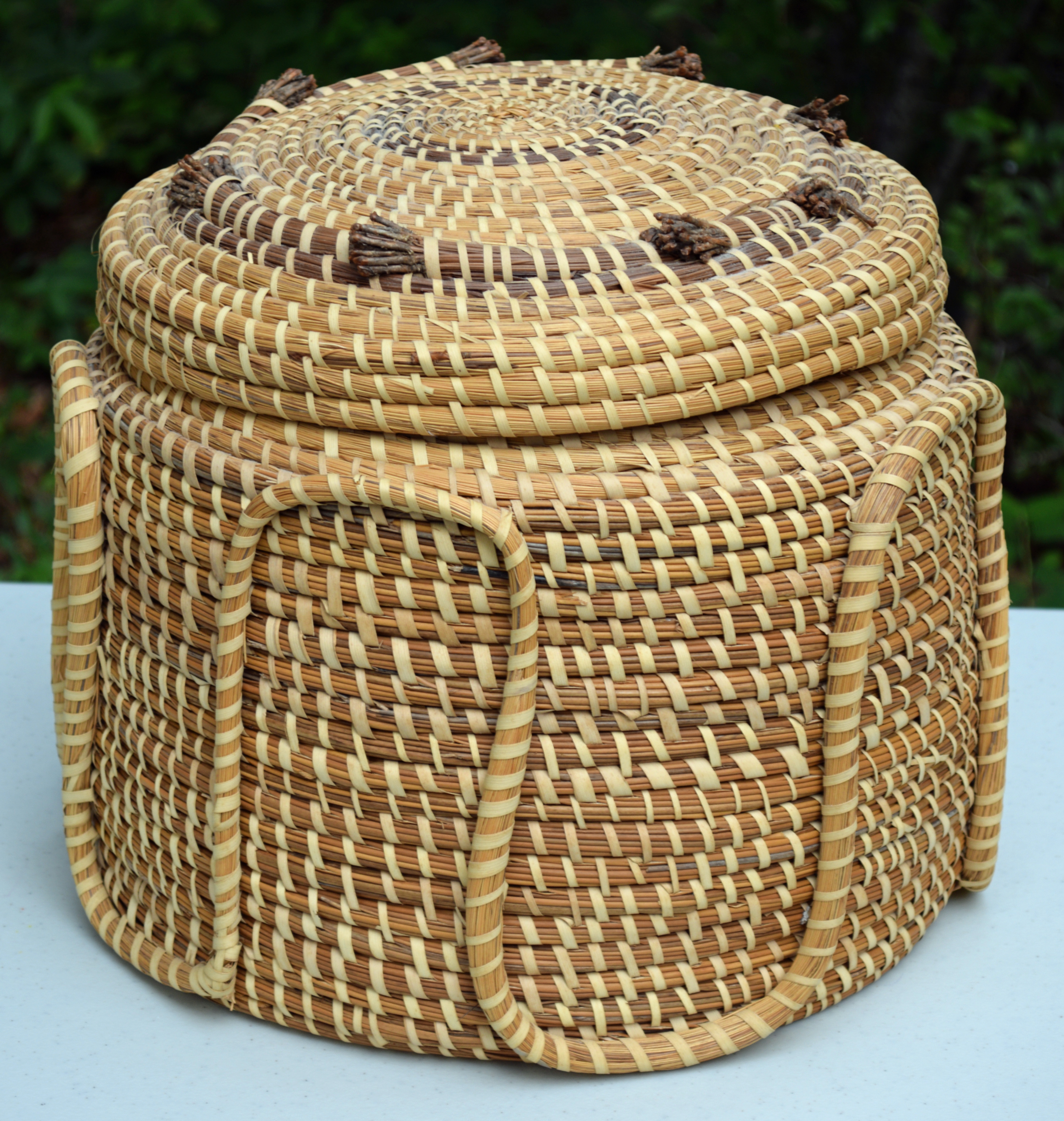
Gullah basket

In the 20th century, some plantations were redeveloped as resort or hunting destinations by wealthy white Americans. Gradually more visitors went to the islands to enjoy their beaches and mild climate. Since the late 20th century, the Gullah people—led by Penn Center and other determined community groups—have been fighting to keep control of their traditional lands. Since the 1960s, resort development on the Sea Islands greatly increased property values, threatening to push the Gullah off family lands which they have owned since emancipation. They have fought back against uncontrolled development on the islands through community action, the courts, and the political process.

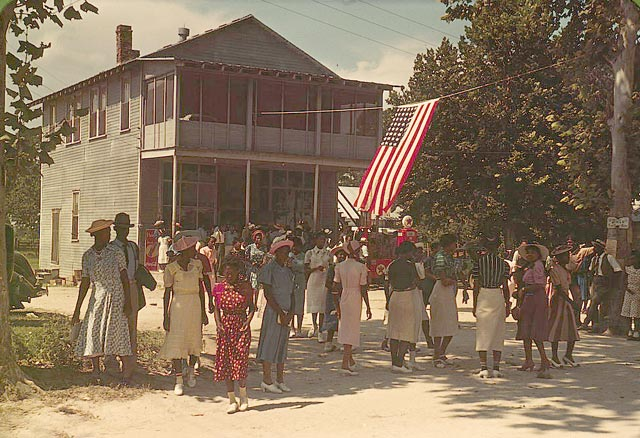
A Fourth of July celebration, St. Helena Island, South Carolina (1939)

The Gullah have also struggled to preserve their traditional culture in the face of much more contact with modern culture and media. In 1979, a translation of the New Testament into the Gullah language was begun. The American Bible Society published De Nyew Testament in 2005. In November 2011, Healin fa de Soul, a five-CD collection of readings from the Gullah Bible, was released. This collection includes Scipcha Wa De Bring Healing ("Scripture That Heals") and the Gospel of John (De Good Nyews Bout Jedus Christ Wa John Write). This was the most extensive collection of Gullah recordings, surpassing those of Lorenzo Dow Turner. The recordings have helped people develop an interest in the culture, because they get to hear the language and learn how to pronounce some words.

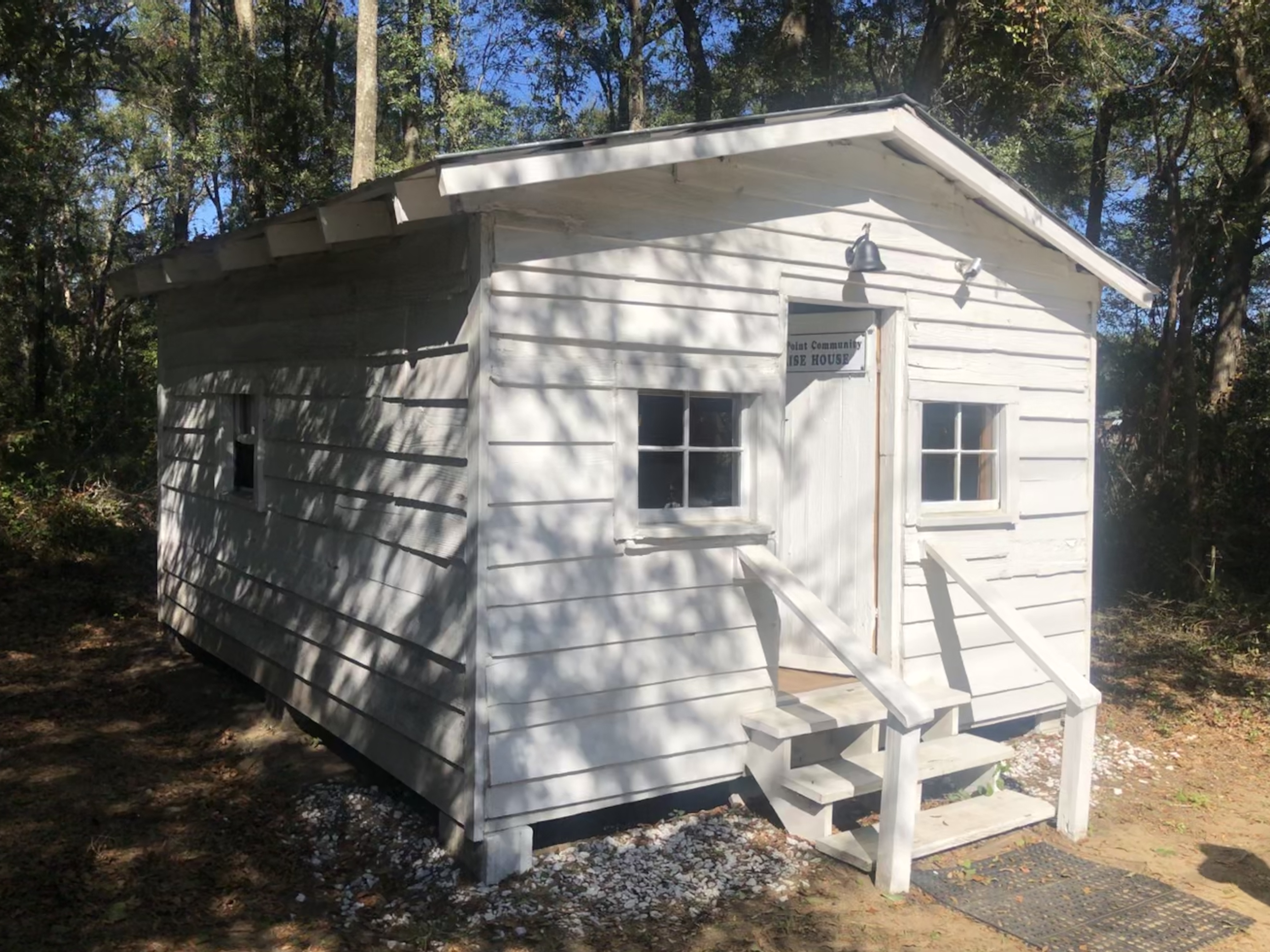
Coffin Point Praise House, 57 Coffin Point Rd, St. Helena Island, South Carolina

The Gullah achieved another victory in 2006 when the U.S. Congress passed the "Gullah/Geechee Cultural Heritage Corridor Act"; it provided US$10 million over 10 years for the preservation and interpretation of historic sites in the Low Country relating to Gullah culture. The Act provides for a Heritage Corridor to extend from southern North Carolina to northern Florida in a project administered by the US National Park Service with extensive consultation with the Gullah community.

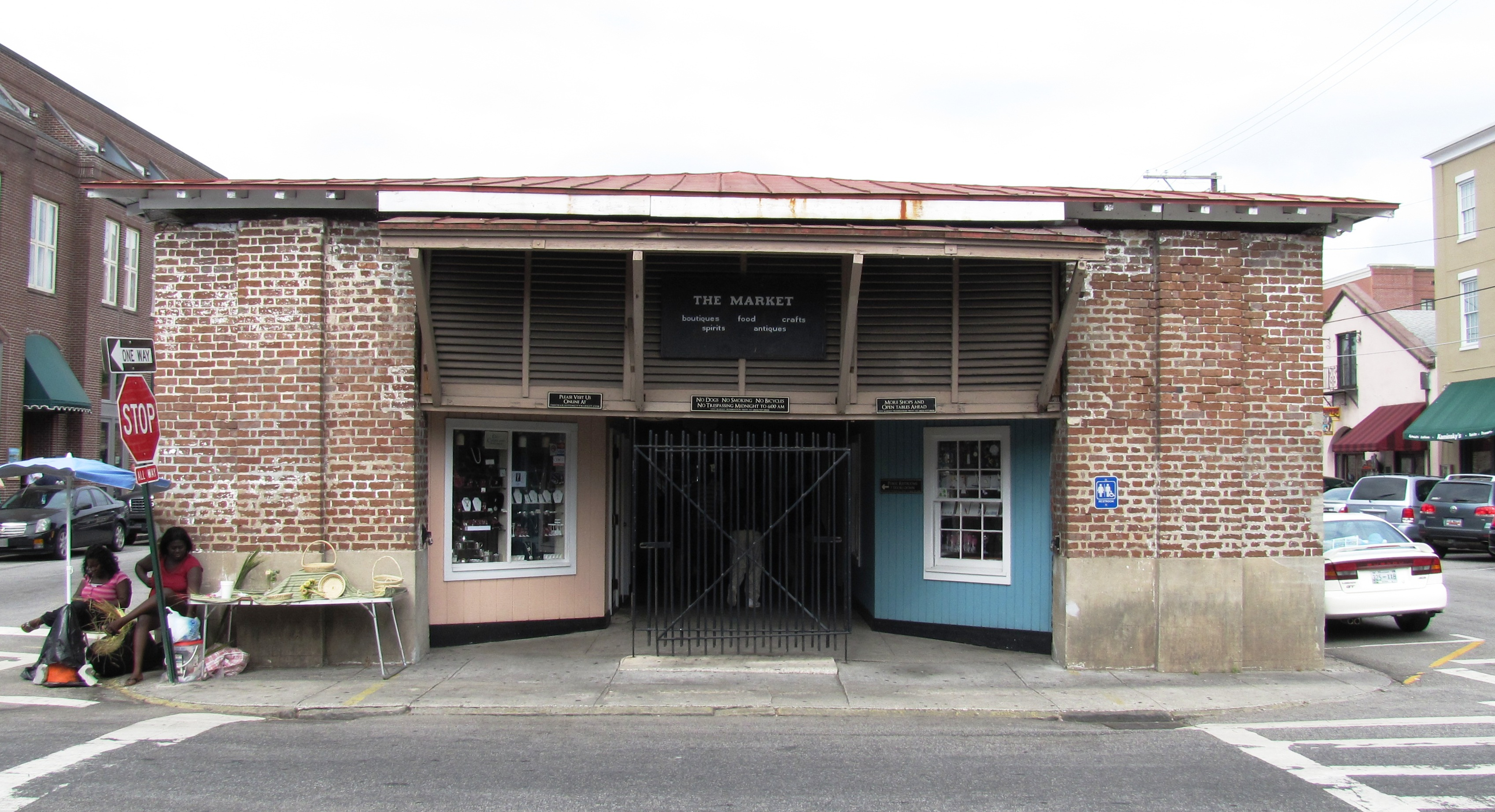
Old City Market shed entrance along Church Street in Charleston. The vendors on the left are selling Gullah sweetgrass baskets. (2010)

The Gullah have also been in contact with West Africa. Gullah groups made three celebrated "homecomings" to Sierra Leone in 1989, 1997, and 2005. Sierra Leone is at the heart of the traditional rice-growing region of West Africa where many of the Gullahs' ancestors originated. Bunce Island, the British slave castle in Sierra Leone, sent many African captives to Charleston and Savannah during the mid- and late 18th century. These dramatic homecomings were the subject of three documentary films—Family Across the Sea (1990), The Language You Cry In (1998), and Priscilla's Legacy.

== Customs and traditions ==
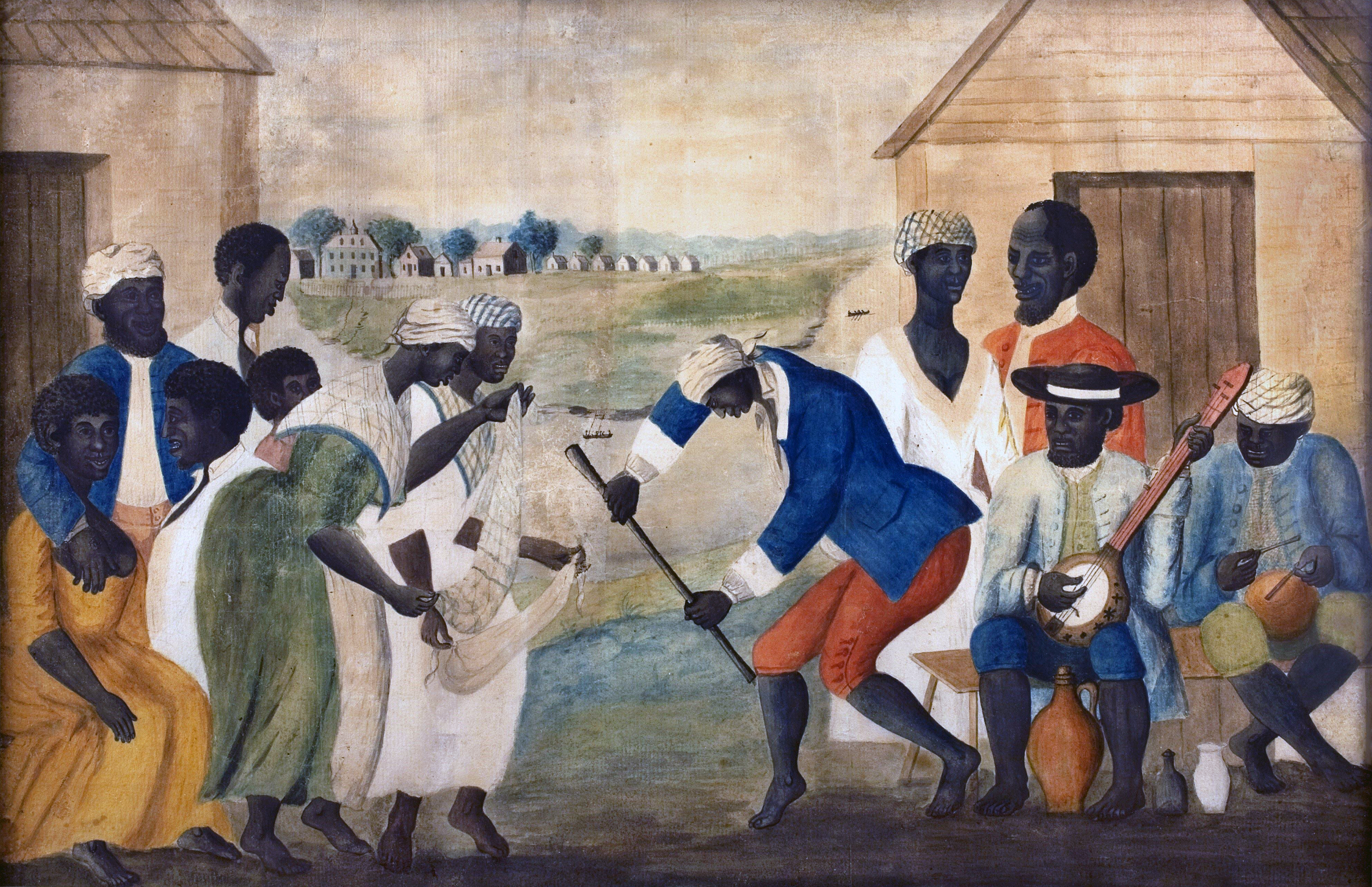
"Old plantation" (1790) demonstrates the cultural retention of Gullah people with aspects such as the banjo and broom hopping.

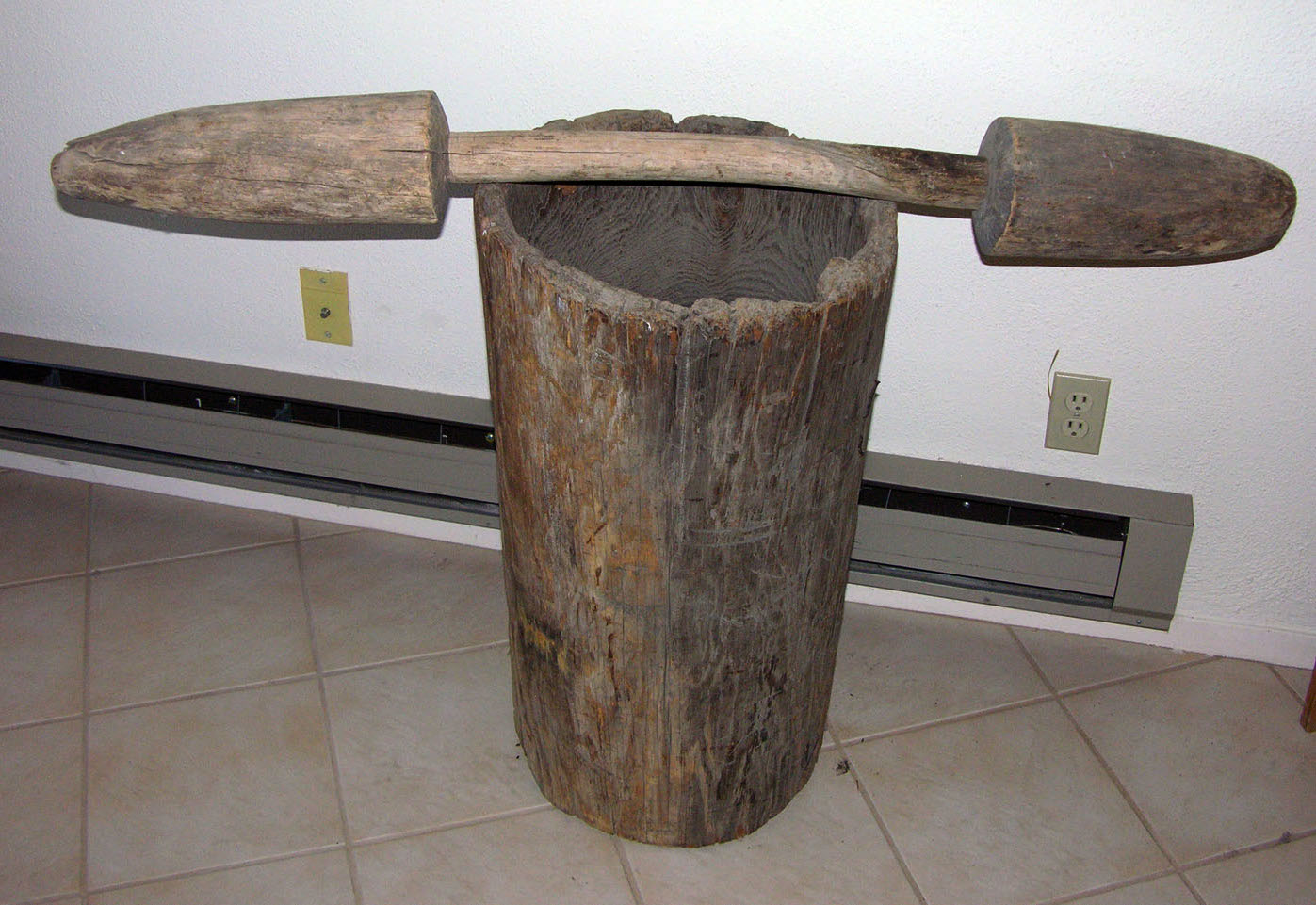
Wooden mortar and pestle from the rice loft of a South Carolina lowcountry plantation

=== African influences ===
- The Gullah word guba (or goober) for peanut derives from the Kikongo and Kimbundu word N'guba.
- The Gullah dishes red rice and okra soup are similar to West African jollof rice and okra soup. Jollof rice is a traditional style of rice preparation brought by the Wolof people of West Africa.
- The Gullah version of "gumbo" has its roots in African cooking. "Gumbo" is derived from the word ngombo meaning okra in several western Bantu languages of the Bakongo and Ambundu people of Angola. It is one of the dish's main ingredients.
- Gullah rice farmers once made and used mortar and pestles and winnowing fanners similar in style to tools used by West African rice farmers.
- Gullah beliefs about "hags" and "haunts" are similar to African beliefs about malevolent ancestors, witches, and "devils" (forest spirits).
- Gullah "root doctors" protect their clients against dangerous spiritual forces by using ritual objects similar to those employed by African traditional healers.
- Gullah herbal medicines are similar to traditional African remedies.
- The Gullah "seekin" ritual is similar to coming of age ceremonies in West African secret societies, such as the Poro and Sande.
- The Gullah ring shout is similar to ecstatic religious rituals performed in West and Central Africa.
- Gullah stories about "Br'er Rabbit" are similar to West and Central African trickster tales about the figures of the clever and conniving rabbit, spider, and tortoise.
- Gullah "sweetgrass baskets" are coil straw baskets made by the descendants of enslaved peoples in the South Carolina Lowcountry. They are nearly identical to traditional coil baskets made by the Wolof people in Senegal.
- Gullah "strip quilts" mimic the design of cloth woven with the traditional strip loom used throughout West Africa. Kente cloth from the Ashanti and the Ewe peoples, as well as Akwete cloth from the Igbo people are woven on the strip loom.
- An African song, preserved by a Gullah family in coastal Georgia, was identified in the 1940s by linguist Lorenzo Turner and found to be a Mende song from Sierra Leone. It is probably the longest text in an African language to survive the transatlantic crossing of enslaved Africans to the present-day United States. Later, in the 1990s, researchers Joseph Opala, Cynthia Schmidt, and Taziff Koroma located a remote village in Sierra Leone where the song is still sung today, and determined it is a funeral hymn. This research and the resulting reunion between a Gullah family and a Mende family that have both retained versions of the song is recounted in the documentary The Language You Cry In (1998).
- Some words coming from other African languages such as Yoruba, Fon, Ewe, Twi, Ga, Mende, and Bini are still used by Gullah people.
- Kperogi reports that Lorenzo Dow Turner recorded Gullah speakers near Darien, Georgia, using Fulfulde-derived numerals from one through nineteen in the 1930s. Kperogi’s examples include go (one), didi (two), je (five), jego (six), sapo (ten), sapo go (eleven), sapo tati (thirteen), and sapo jenai (nineteen).
- The Gullahs’ English-based creole language is strikingly similar to Sierra Leone Krio of West Africa and contains such identical expressions as bigyai ("greedy"), pantap ("on top of"), ohltu ("both"), tif ("steal"), yeys ("ear"), and swit ("delicious").

=== Cuisine ===
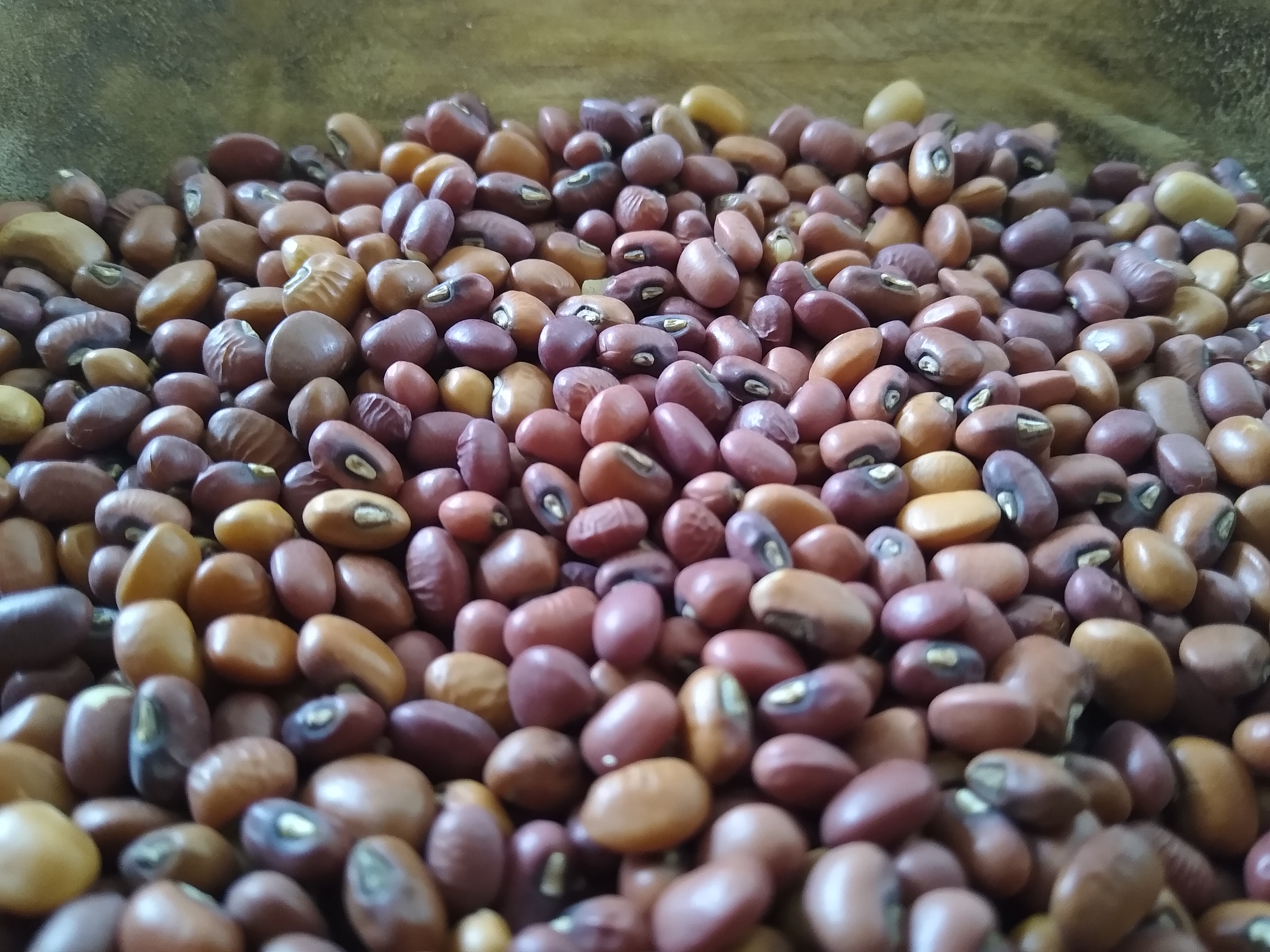
Sea Island red peas, an heirloom variety of cowpeas grown by the Gullah

The Gullah have preserved many of their west African food ways growing and eating crops such as Sea island red peas, Carolina Gold rice, Sea island Benne, Sea island Okra, sorghum, and watermelon all of which were brought with them from West Africa. Rice is a staple food in Gullah communities and continues to be cultivated in abundance in the coastal regions of Georgia and South Carolina. Rice is also an important food in West African cultures. As descendants of enslaved Africans, the Gullah continued the traditional food and food techniques of their ancestors, demonstrating another link to traditional African cultures.

Rice is a core commodity of the Gullah food system: a meal was not considered complete without rice. There are strict rituals surrounding the preparation of rice in the Gullah communities. First, individuals would remove the darker grains from the rice, and then hand wash the rice numerous times before it was ready for cooking. The Gullah people would add enough water for the rice to steam on its own, but not so much that one would have to stir or drain it. These traditional techniques were passed down during the period of slavery and are still an important part of rice preparation by Gullah people.

The first high-profile book on Gullah cooking was published in 2022 by Emily Meggett, an 89-year-old Gullah cook.

=== Music ===
Gullah culture has a rich musical tradition, owing to their relative isolation and strong cultural links. Much of their music follows a call-and-response structure common in African musical traditions. The most well-known proponents of Gullah music are the Georgia Sea Island Singers, a group founded in the early 1900s on St. Simon's Island. Lead mostly by Bessie Jones, they have released many albums, were recorded by Alan Lomax, and performed at venues such as Carnegie Hall and the Newport Folk Festival.

=== Celebrating Gullah culture ===
Over the years, the Gullah have attracted study by many historians, linguists, folklorists, and anthropologists interested in their rich cultural heritage. Many academic books on that subject have been published. The Gullah have also become a symbol of cultural pride for black people throughout the United States and a subject of general interest in the media. Numerous newspaper and magazine articles, documentary films, and children's books on Gullah culture, have been produced, in addition to popular novels set in the Gullah region. In 1991 Julie Dash wrote and directed Daughters of the Dust, the first feature film about the Gullah, set at the turn of the 20th century on St. Helena Island. Born into a Gullah family, she was the first Black American woman director to produce a feature film.

Gullah people now organize cultural festivals every year in towns up and down the Lowcountry. Hilton Head Island, for instance, hosts a "Gullah Celebration" in February. It includes "De Aarts ob We People" show; the "Ol’ Fashioned Gullah Breakfast"; "National Freedom Day," the "Gullah Film Fest", "A Taste of Gullah" food and entertainment, a "Celebration of Lowcountry Authors and Books," an "Arts, Crafts & Food Expo," and "De Gullah Playhouse". Beaufort hosts the oldest and the largest celebration, "The Original Gullah Festival" in May. The nearby Penn Center on St. Helena Island holds "Heritage Days" in November. Other Gullah festivals are celebrated on James Island, South Carolina, and Sapelo Island, Georgia.

Gullah culture is also being celebrated elsewhere in the United States. The High Art Museum in Atlanta has presented exhibits about Gullah culture. The Black Cultural Center at Purdue University in West Lafayette, Indiana conducted a research tour, cultural arts festival, and other related events to showcase the Gullah culture. The Black Cultural Center Library maintains a bibliography of Gullah books and materials, as well. Metro State College in Denver, Colorado, hosted a conference on Gullah culture, called The Water Brought Us: Gullah History and Culture, which featured a panel of Gullah scholars and cultural activists. These events in Indiana and Colorado are typical of the attention Gullah culture regularly receives throughout the United States.

VOA report about an exhibit about Gullah culture

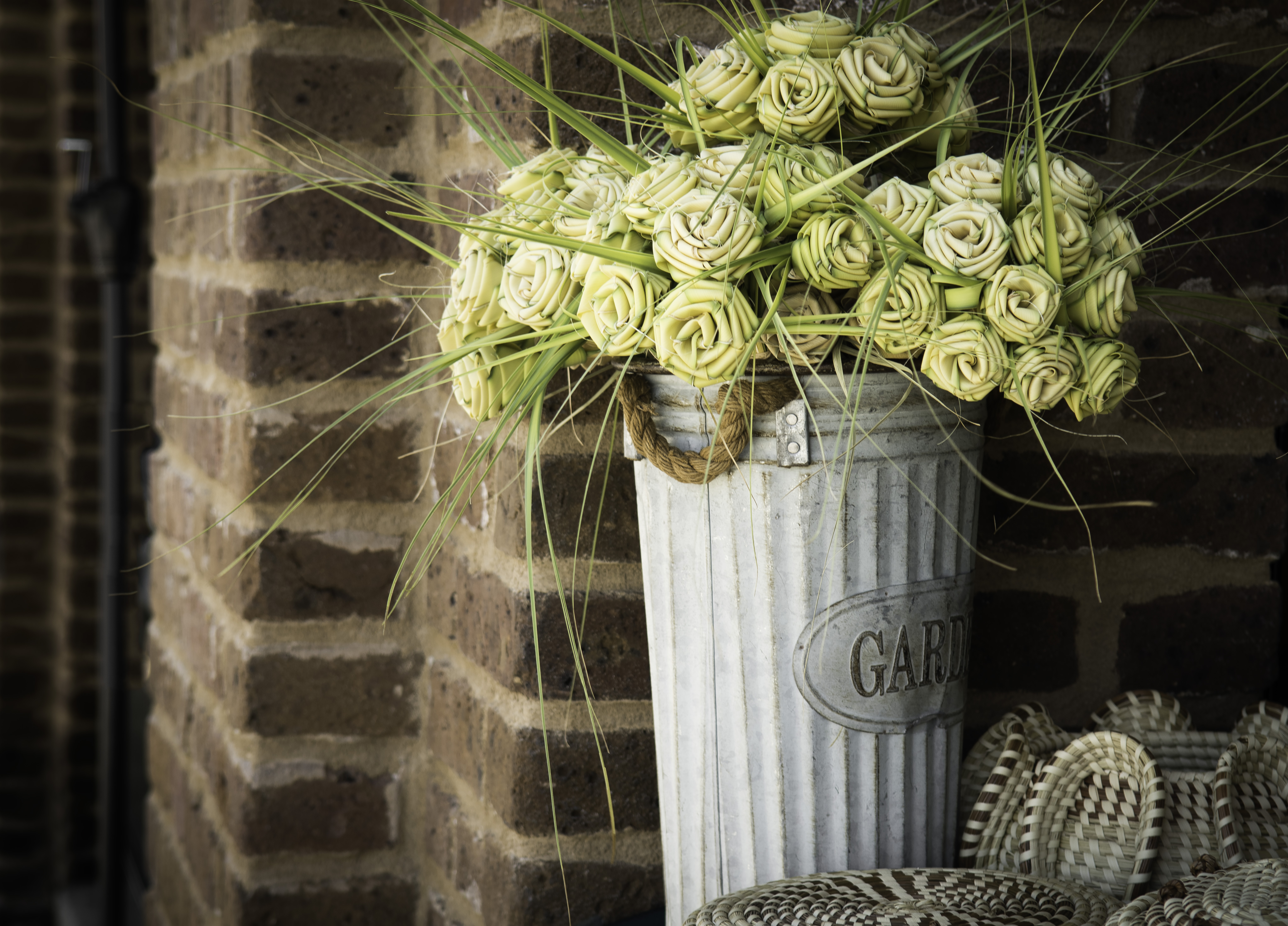
Sweet grass baskets made and sold by the African American Gullah community can be found throughout City Market.

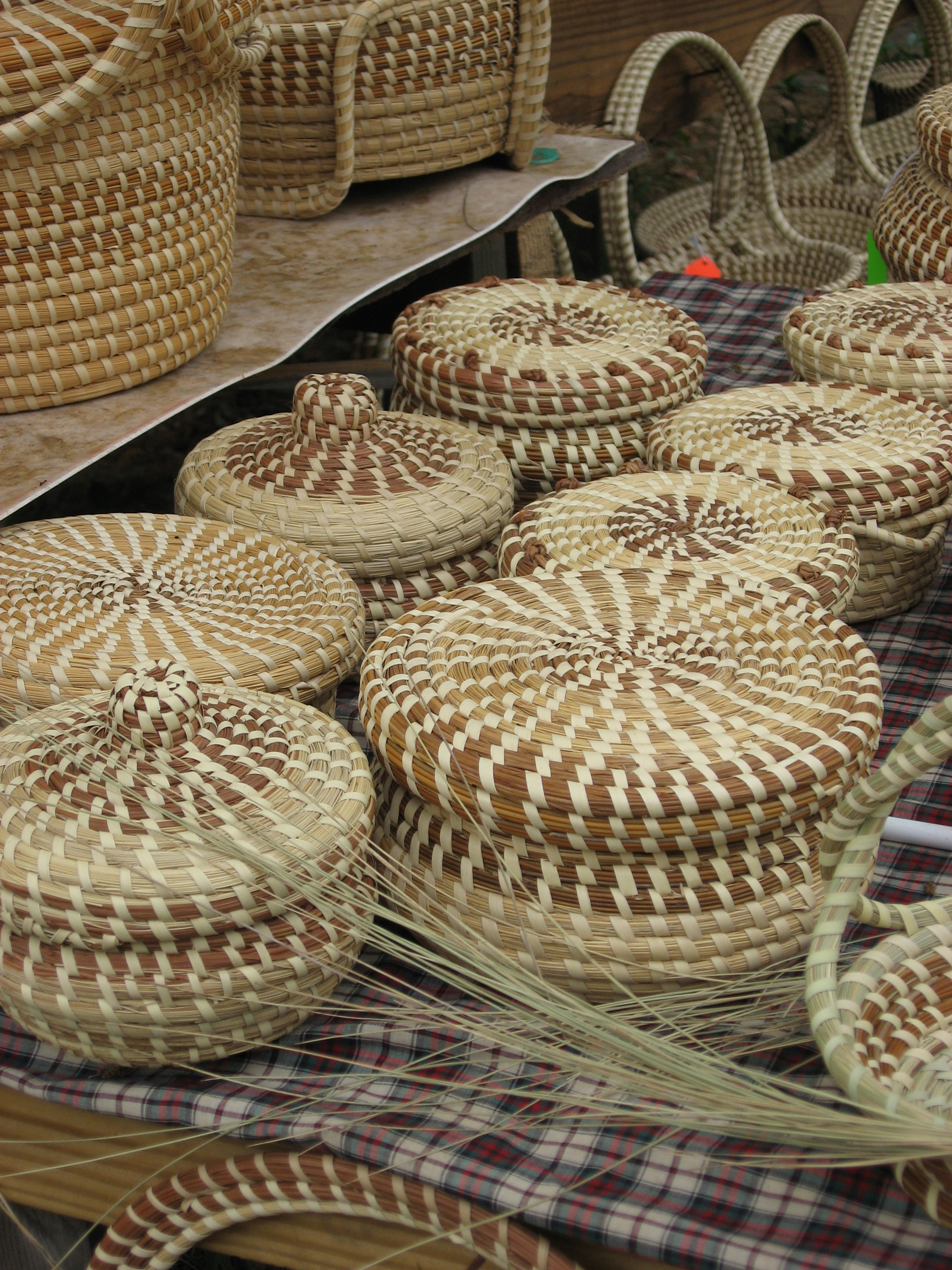
Gullah sweetgrass baskets from Edisto island

=== Cultural survival ===
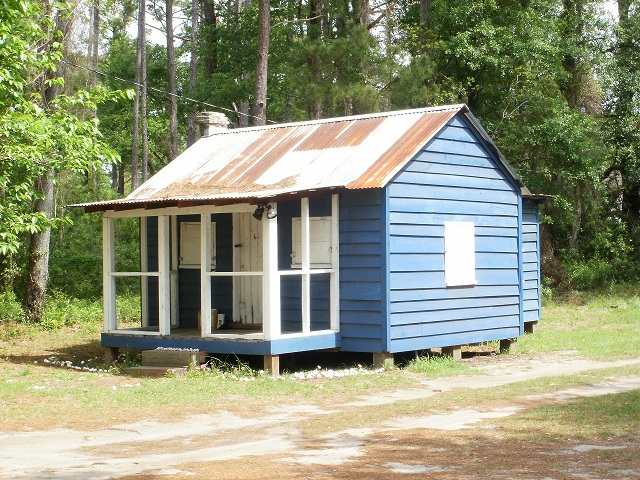
A Gullah house painted in the color of haint blue

Gullah culture has proven to be particularly resilient. Gullah traditions are strong in the rural areas of the Lowcountry mainland and on the Sea Islands, and among their people in urban areas such as Charleston and Savannah. Gullah people who have left the Lowcountry and moved far away have also preserved traditions; for instance, many Gullah in New York, who went North in the Great Migration of the first half of the 20th century, have established their own neighborhood churches in Harlem, Brooklyn, and Queens. Typically they send their children back to rural communities in South Carolina and Georgia during the summer months to live with grandparents, uncles, and aunts. Gullah people living in New York frequently return to the Lowcountry to retire. Second- and third-generation Gullah in New York often maintain many of their traditional customs and many still speak the Gullah language. Gullah–Geechee people brought the ring shout to northern African American communities in Harlem and the ritual dance evolved to include jazz piano.

The Gullah custom of painting porch ceilings haint blue to deter haints, or ghosts, survives in the American South. It has also been adopted by White Southerners.

== Representation in art, entertainment, and media ==
Gullah Gullah Island is an American musical children's television series that was produced by and aired on the Nick Jr. programming block on the Nickelodeon network from October 24, 1994, to April 7, 1998. The show was hosted by Ron Daise—now the former vice president for Creative Education at Brookgreen Gardens in Murrells Inlet, South Carolina—and his wife Natalie Daise, both of whom also served as cultural advisors, and were inspired by the Gullah culture of Ron Daise's home of St. Helena Island, South Carolina, part of the Sea Islands.

== Notable Gullah people ==
- Emory Campbell, community leader
- Marquetta Goodwine, activist
- Griffin Lotson, historian
- Sunn m'Cheaux, Harvard lecturer and linguistics educator
- Emily Meggett, chef and author
- Sallie Ann Robinson, cook and author
- Eden Royce, author
- Vertamae Smart-Grosvenor, culinary anthropologist

=== Notable people of Gullah descent ===
- Clarence Thomas, attorney and U.S. Supreme Court justice
- Robert Sengstacke Abbott, attorney and publisher
- Cornelia Walker Bailey, writer
- Jim Brown, athlete and actor
- Kardea Brown, cook
- Marion Brown, musician
- Craig Anthony Bullock (DJ Homicide), musician
- Julie Dash, filmmaker
- Sam Doyle, artist
- William Jonathan Drayton Jr. (Flavor Flav), musician
- Edda L. Fields-Black, historian
- Joe Frazier, athlete
- Candice Glover, singer and performer
- Mary Jackson, artist
- James Jamerson, musician
- Bumpy Johnson, organized crime boss
- Earl Manigault, athlete
- Lenard Larry McKelvey (Charlamagne Tha God), radio host
- Amari Middleton (OsamaSon), rapper
- Eric Milligan (The Blixunami), professional mermaid
- Michelle Obama, attorney and former First Lady
- Joseph Rainey, politician
- Philip Reid, artist
- Chris Rock, actor and comedian
- Tony Rock, actor and comedian
- Raven Saunders, athlete
- Philip Simmons, artist
- Robert Smalls, politician
- Eddie Sweat, horse racer
- Lynae Vanee, poet, educator, and social media influencer
- Robert Lee Watt, musician
- Maurice Samuel Young (Trick Daddy), musician
- Trim (American rapper), musician

== See also ==
- African Americans in Florida
- African Americans in Georgia
- African Americans in North Carolina
- African Americans in South Carolina
- Atlantic Creole
- Bilali Document
- Black Seminoles
- Bristol slave trade
- Coastwise slave trade
- Colonial South and the Chesapeake
- First Africans in Virginia
- Virginia Mixson Geraty
- Ambrose E. Gonzales
- Great Dismal Swamp maroons
- Gullah language
- Igbo Landing
- Joseph Opala
- Port Royal Experiment
- Slavery in the colonial history of the United States
- Stono Rebellion
- Peter H. Wood
- Boo hag
