= Ring shout =

African American ritual dance

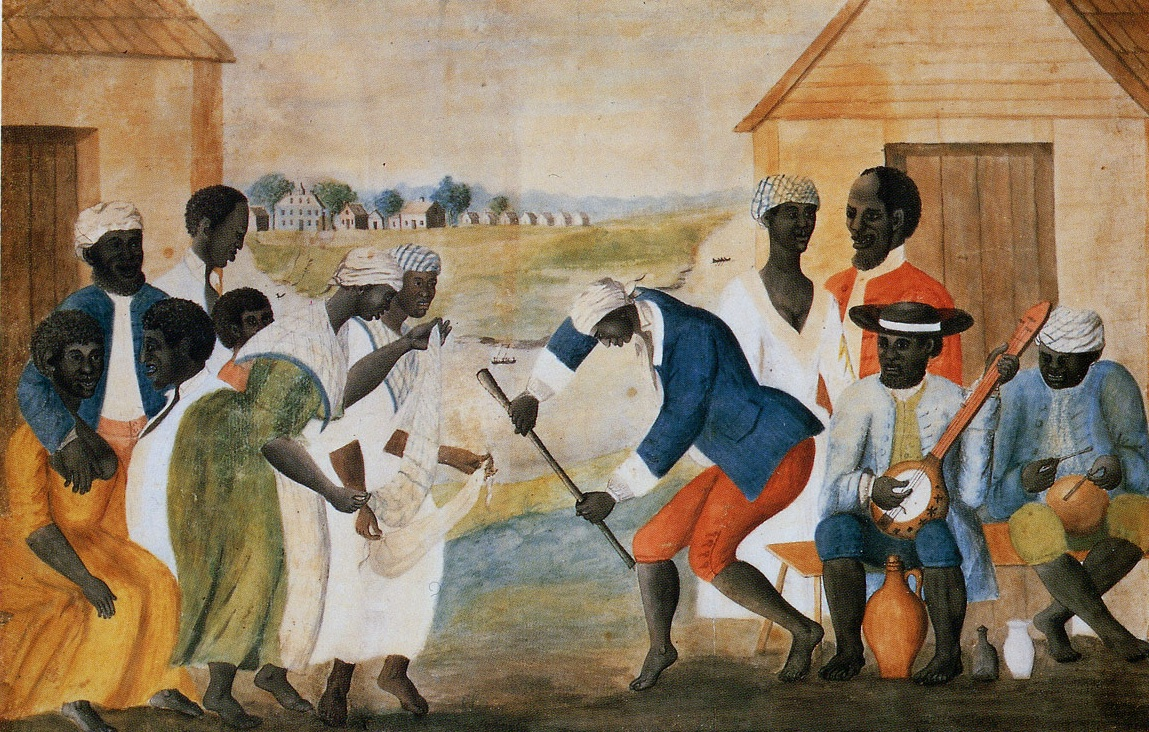
The 18th-century painting The Old Plantation depicts several examples of Africanisms brought to the Carolinas, including musical instruments, headdresses, dance steps, conjure stick, and spiritual traditions.

The ring shout is a distinctive African American ritual dance originating with enslaved Africans in the southern United States where worshippers move in a counterclockwise circle while hand-clapping, foot-patting and shuffling, stick-beating to foreground the rhythm, and call-and-response singing. It is an oral tradition passed down in African American families since the era of slavery. Elders and religious leaders pass down songs and shouts to the younger generation. The practice of sacred circle dancing combines spirituals and rhythmic music, reflecting its Christian and African spiritual and cultural importance. Most scholars agree it is a "Black holy dance" that developed in the living quarters of enslaved African practitioners and Black Christian "praise houses" through a fusion of Central and West African spiritual traditions (like counterclockwise circle dances, polyrhythms, and ancestor veneration), and revivalistic Christian practices in either the eighteenth or nineteenth century. The ring shout is part of the Black musical tradition.

According to silver professor of history and African American studies Michael A. Gomez, "the West Central African use of ring ceremonies was the main source for the development of the ring shout and the minkisi the basis of hoodoo." Though it is not definitively known when the ring shout was first observed, there are several accounts of its existence. Methodist missionaries recorded the ritual in the 1800s. Musicologist and educator Eileen Southern traced the earliest observance of the ring shout to a 1819 observance of the secret African ritual dances that took place later in the Black quarters of Philadelphia after a Christian camp meeting. The ring shout was also observed being practiced among enslaved and free Black Americans during Christian revival services in the 1840s.

Early accounts also highlight that the ring shout was originally rebuked by white Christian clergy who claimed the dance to be "a relic of some African rite". Black clergy were also known to publicly disapprove of the dance in front of white observers but practiced it themselves in Black spaces. In addition to ring shout ceremonies being gatherings where enslaved Africans could seek comfort and relief from their everyday troubles, they were also a place where abolitionists, like Nat Turner, Denmark Vesey, and Gullah Jack, could plot rebellions for freedom. Today, the ring shout continues as a pivotal part of Hoodoo tradition to invoke the ancestors through veneration and spirit possession. The shout is also observed by Black Americans in Christian churches of the Methodist, Baptist and Pentecostal denominations. In these settings, the dance may occur when a congregant experiences the New Birth or became entirely sanctified.

== Description ==
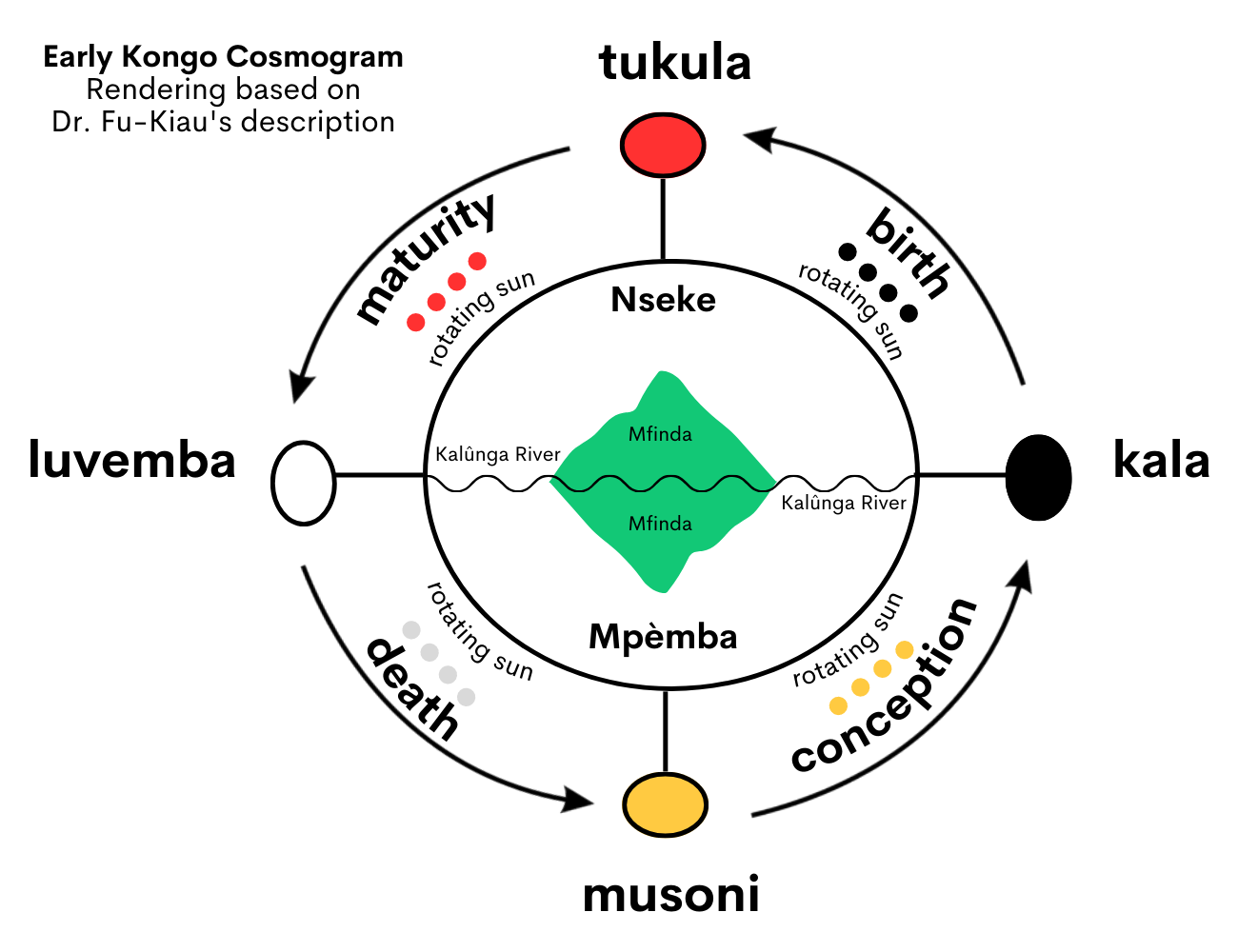
The Kongo cosmogram may have inspired the ring shout in African-American communities. It is a sacred dance performed to become possessed by the Holy Spirit or ancestral spirits.

In African American folk spiritual traditions, a "shout" refers less to vocal volume than to a distinctive way of the spiritual performance. The "shout" can be characterized by collective participation, rhythmic movement, and repetition. Such practices are defined primarily by how they are performed rather than by fixed texts or musical forms. In the traditional ring shout, participants move in a counterclockwise circle with their knees bent while hand-clapping, foot-patting and shuffling, time-keeping, and call-and-response singing with one person standing in the middle of the circle stick-beating to foreground the rhythm.

When describing the ring shout professor of world religion Clive Erricker stated:

The historical origin of tarrying in the United States can be found in the black Christian practice of the ring-shout. The names ranged from Rocking Daniel and the Rope Dance to Ring. It was considered crucial for the invocation of the Holy Spirit in order for the conversion of sinners to occur: 'sinners won't get converted unless there is a ring.' During a ring-shout, a ring is formed arounda group of people who sing, the ring moving in a counter-clockwise direction. For the ring, shouts of encouragement are given to those encircled.

Pointing out the "Africanisms" of the Ring Shout, cultural sociologist and professor Katrina Hazzard-Donald asserted:

The Ring Shout was a counter-clockwise, sacred circle dance that appears to have been done universally among African American bondsmen, and later among freedmen. “The Shout,” as it was known, used subdued stepping and hopping footwork performed with a system of gesture, spirit possession, individualized sacred dancing and specific music, particularly vocal shouting. The music accompanying the Ring Shout was performed by the Shouters themselves. Singing, tapping sticks, hand claps and foot stomps provided the musical backdrop, while subtle jerking motions in the dancers’ bodies provided an additional rhythmic anchor to the Shout. Shouters would later add other instruments as the worship became modernized and adapted to demographic changes in the African American population. The Ring Shout appeared on antebellum plantations, as well as in urban areas. It frequently puzzled whites who often viewed it with suspicion, disgust, fear and misinterpretation.

A white observer of the ring shout wrote his account:

Tonight I have been to a “shout” which seems to me certainly the remains of some old idol worship. The negroes sing a kind of chorus—three standing apart to lead and clap—and then all the others go shuffling ‘round in a circle following one another with not much regularity, turning round occasionally and bending the knees, and stamping so that the whole floor swings. In never saw anything so savage. They call it a religious ceremony, but it seems more like a regular frolic to me.

As described by historians and folklorists Glenn Hinson and William Ferris:

The shout is not just sung; it is danced, and danced with the entire body. The dancers always move counterclockwise in a circle. During the shout, the dancers and singers always sing a song that takes a call-and-response form, with numerous repetitions that foreground the cooperative nature of the singing. These repeated passages favor rhythm over melody in a way that emphasizes the collaborative nature of the event. Finally, the worship continues for a long period and escalates in intensity. As this intensity mounts, the shouters feel the presence of the Spirit in their midst. The ring shout, properly speaking, becomes a physical, aesthetic, and spiritual expression of communion. Eyewitness observers of early ring shouts frequently reported that the shouts took place after the close of formal church services.

Writer and activist James Weldon Johnson, remembering his observances of the ring shout, recounted and claimed:

When there was a "ring shout" the weird music and the sound of thudding feet set the silence of the night vibrating and throbbing with a vague terror. Many a time I woke suddenly and lay a long while strangely troubled by these sounds, the like of which my great-grandmother Sarah had heard as a child. The shouters, formed in a ring, men and women alternating, their bodies close together, moved round and round on shuffling feet that never left the floor. With the heel of the right foot they pounded out the fundamental beat of the dance and with their hands clapped out the varying rhythmical accents of the chant; for the music was, in fact, an African chant and the shout an African dance, whole pagan rite transplanted and adapted to Christian worship. Round and round the ring would go. One, two, three, four, five hours, the very monotony of sound and motion inducing an ecstatic frenzy. Aunt Venie, it seems, never, even after the hardest day of washing and ironing, missed a "ring shout."

In the modern Black Church and in Pentecostal churches, the shout consists of a person dancing a two-step while swinging their arms and sometimes jubilantly leaping into the air intermittently. If one or more people join it, it becomes what is known as a praise break.

=== Method of practice ===
The leader of the ring shout is called the songster who is responsible for calling out the lines for everyone to sing during the shout. Rhythms come from the sticker a person who uses a stick that hits the wooden floors to make a rhythmic sound. The songs sung during the ring shout reference the hardships of slavery and escape to freedom. Women sing what the songster calls out while dancing in a circle counterclockwise clapping their hands and shuffling their feet. Many ring shouters believe while performing this dance the legs and feet should not cross.

== Historical documentation ==
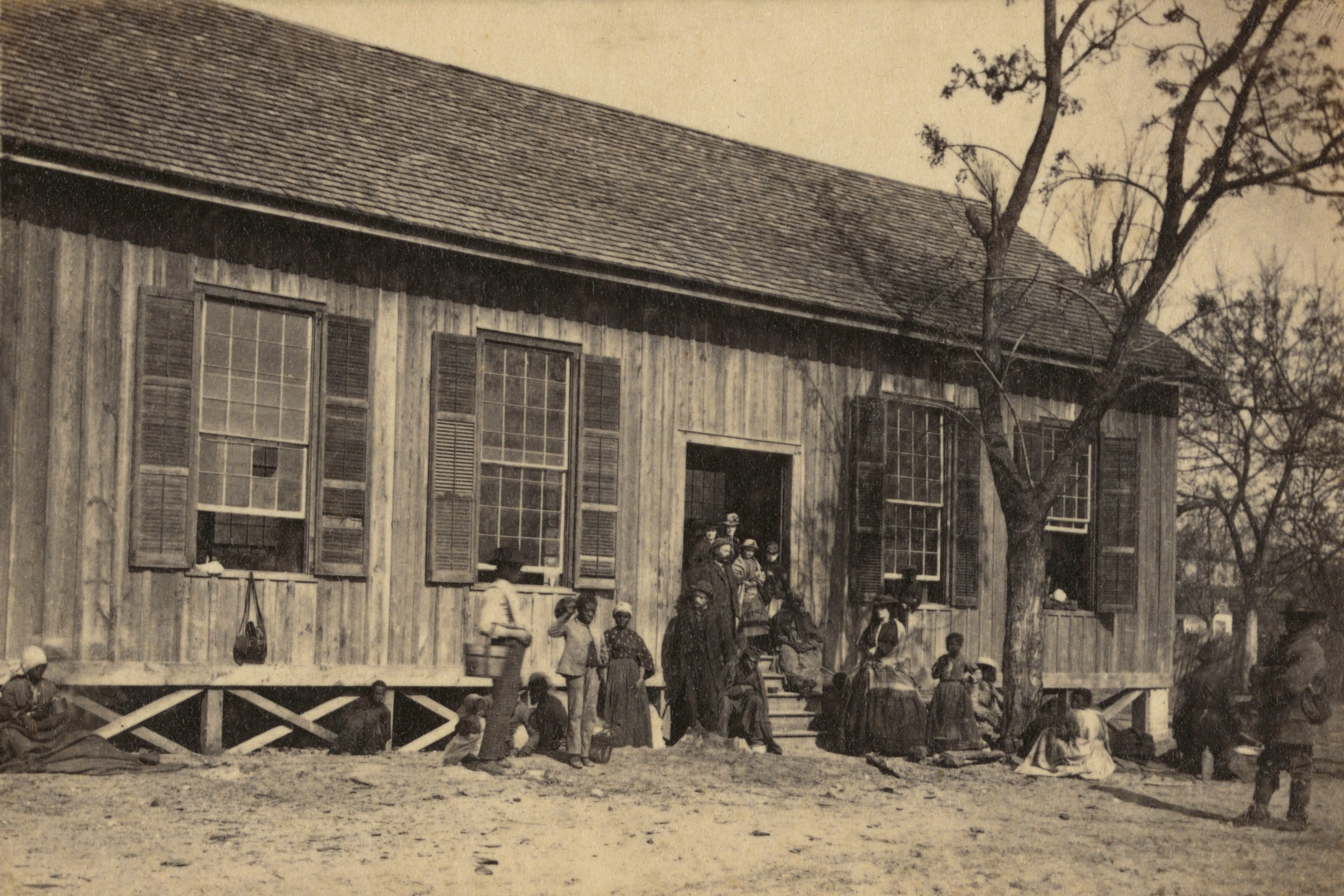
(Freedmen's school, Edisto Island, S.C.) Northern teachers documented the ring shout practiced by their students and local Gullah Geechee residents.

Enslaved people practiced the ring shout in the Southern United States since the colonial period. While enslaved Africans of Igbo and Akan descent were the majority in Virginia and Maryland for a time, farther south in South Carolina and Georgia was dominated by Congo-Angolans, whose complex religious system and circular cosmology greatly influenced the African-based community. According to silver professor of history and African American studies Michael A. Gomez, "the West Central African use of ring ceremonies was the main source for the development of the ring shout and the minkisi the basis of hoodoo." When these ethnic groups learned that their spiritual beliefs echoed those of the Bambara and Temne/Mende groups, especially pertaining to reincarnation, they were able to transcend cultural barriers and form a hybridized Pan-African belief system that encompassed all of the points where their traditional beliefs intersected. Given all of the available evidence, Gomez concluded that "those participating in the [ring] shout during the eighteenth century were overwhelmingly non-Christian."

The enslaved did not document their experiences, as many were illiterate due to anti-literacy laws in the United States that made it crime to teach enslaved people to read and write. Slaveholders, government officials, missionaries, abolitionists, teachers, and Union Civil War soldiers all documented this practice in their writings from the 18th and 19th centuries. According to musicologist and educator Eileen Southern, whose research focused on the history of Black American music, the first written account of the ring shout occurred in 1819 Philadelphia by leading Methodist church father John Fanning Watson who complained that the illiterate Black people of the society were composing and singing their own forms of hymns that he considered "a growing evil." Watson also reported on "a curious activity of the Negroes" that took place later after church services in the Black quarters, where he observed them patting off rhythms against their thighs, doing a "shuffle step" dance and singing. Southern contends that "this is the earliest account of a religious dance ceremony of African origin, the ring shout" that later came to be described by many. Though the ring shout was practiced semi-secretly after institutional church services, this African-derived worship practice remained central to early African American Christianity.

Southern also attested that "during the period when Watson was writing" in the early 1800s, similar ring shouts were also being practiced by enslaved Africans from the Bakongo, Mandinka, Mina, and Fulani ethnic groups in Congo Square (then referred to as Place Congo) in New Orleans, Louisiana. Musicologist Robert Palmer wrote about some accounts of the ring shout that date from the 1840s during the pinnacle of the revival-era in Christianity. Palmer stated that it was a "Black holy dance" that "developed with the widespread conversion of slaves to Christianity during the revival fervors of the eighteenth and early nineteenth centuries." He further wrote that the "earliest accounts date from the 1840s; more vivid descriptions from the twentieth century leave little doubt that the dancing and stamping constituted a kind of drumming, especially when worshipers had a wooden church floor to stamp on." However, there is clear documentation of earlier accounts of the ring shout.

Charlotte Forten was a Black abolitionist teacher from Philadelphia, Pennsylvania who taught freedmen at the Penn School on St. Helena Island in South Carolina from 1862 to 1863 and documented several ring shout experiences in praise houses. Forten wrote she enjoyed the singing and the "shout" from her students and the local residents. In 1862, Laura Towne, an abolitionist teacher from Pennsylvania and founder of the Penn School, also wrote about the ring shout in praise houses but said the practice was "the remains of some old idol worship" and called it savage. Union Civil War soldier, Thomas Wentworth Higginson, commander of the 1st South Carolina Colored Infantry Regiment, documented spirituals and ring shout practices among the 1st South Carolina soldiers at army camps. An 1867 Sea Islands account of the ring shout that was reprinted by W.F. Allen stated "It is not unlikely that this remarkable religious ceremony is a relic of some African dance." Folklorists and musicologists John and Alan Lomax who recorded the parallels of ring shouts performed in Louisiana, Texas, Georgia, the Bahamas, and Haiti said in 1934, "This shout pattern is demonstrably West African in origin." Anthropologist Harold Courlander, another observer, maintained that the "circular movement, shuffling steps and stamping, postures and gestures, the manner of standing, the way the arms are held out for balance or pressed against the sides, the movements of the shoulder, all are African in conception and derivation."

There were a few formerly enslaved persons who documented religious practices of the enslaved they were, Frederick Douglass, William Wells Brown, and Harriet Jacobs. According to research from Professor Jermaine Archer who read the slave narratives of these individuals, circle dancing, shouting, and conjure were practiced in Tennessee, Maryland, and other Southern states in the antebellum era. Harriet Tubman told biographer Sarah Bradford her experience participating in a ring shout ceremony in Gullah Geechee communities in South Carolina. During the American Civil War, Northerners and Union soldiers witnessed the ring shout for the first time. Black Sea Islanders only allowed the Northerners to watch the shout and did not allow them to participate.

=== Oral interviews and ethnographic studies ===
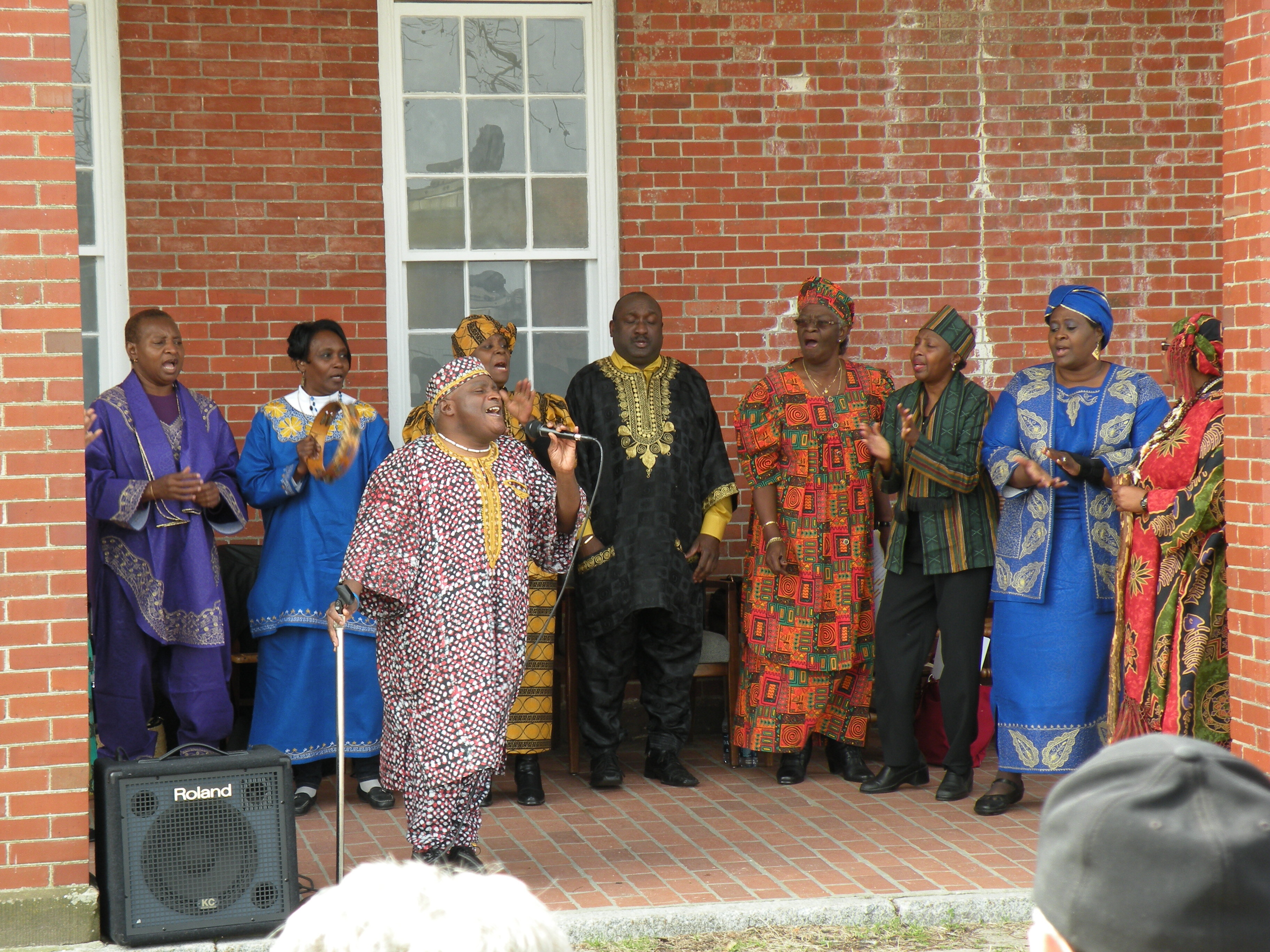
Gullah Geechee people performing traditional song and dance during a special event at Fort Pulaski National Monument.

Shirley Boteler Mock, who is a research fellow and author at the University of Texas at Austin, conducted a study of Black Seminole communities in Mexico and Texas and interviewed African American women. Mock's book was published in 2012 and the women interviewed spoke of their ancestors practicing the ring shout in churches in Brackettville, Texas in the 1930s. The Black Seminole women who practiced the ring shout combined Gullah Geechee spiritual beliefs of rootwork (herbalism) and dream reading.

In 2017, the Smithsonian Institution Folkways Recording conducted interviews in Gullah Geechee communities in the Sea Islands of Georgia. The Mcintosh County ring shouters share their ring shout culture and family history. According to the ring shouters, the songs and dances in the ring shout were taught to them by their grandmothers and elders in the community and that their grandmothers learned the ring shout and songs from their elders and grandparents. Visual artist, Charmaine Minniefield, published her "Praise House Project" in 2022, working with Emory University. This project involved working with African Americans about their experiences within Black families and communities and placing multimedia, site-specific public art in communities, aims to preserve African American histories and address systemic inequities and erasure. Mannifield writes about the praise house as:

Praise houses were small wooden structures, initially on slave plantations, used for gathering and worship. It was in these secret, safe spaces that the Ring Shout was performed, a traditional African American movement practice taught to me by my great-grandmother. The Ring Shout was reborn in the Western hemisphere as resistance to laws intended to dismantle African identity and community. This full-body rhythmic prayer was performed as congregants would stomp, or shout, upon the wooden floors creating a communal drum, secretly preserving their identity and traditions — all while remembering freedom. My work recalls this prayer.

The ring shout was believed to have died out by the mid-20th century, but in the 1980s, music folklorists heard of a community of traditional ring shouters near Eulonia, Georgia that had practiced it for generations. African American ring shouters of Bolden or "Briar Patch" perform the ring shout at Mt. Calvary Baptist Church to bring in the New Year during Watch Night.

=== Continuation ===
Griffin Lotson, whose ancestry traces back to enslaved Africans from Crescent, Georgia, is a slavery ring shout instructor and manager of the Gullah Geechee Ring Shouters. Lotson and the ring shouters travel the United States and the world teaching people about the history of the ring shout and its development in enslaved communities. In a 2018 interview Lotson says this about the rings shout:

We don't try to add to it. We just do it. And now we are going to show that connection in Sierra Leone. We have been talking about it for decades, but this will be the first that you got U.S. citizens, descendants of Africa, that will go back and share the ring shout that was birthed on the plantation and they share that ring shout that originally came from Africa. The beat that we do came from Africa and the dance we do came from Africa. The songs we sing in America came from the plantation … in Africa, they didn't sing the same songs, but we kept that tradition and we added our new found religion, which is the Christian religion...

In 2019, BBC World Service recorded Gullah Geechee people performing the ring shout in Sierre Leone. Black shouters performed the dance in West Africa to return the tradition back to its spiritual origin.

In 2024, to learn about their culture, which stems from the African traditions of enslaved people on the lower Atlantic coast, Gullah Geechee youth connected with ring shout elders. The Winnsboro Easter Rock Ensemble (the Rockers), accompanied by youth participants from Winnsboro, Louisiana, traveled to Darien, Georgia, to perform alongside the Gullah Geechee ring shouters. Future generations experienced the ring shout through this cultural exchange. The Mcintosh County ring shouters continue to teach African Americans the history and development of the ring shout at special events.

== Spiritual and religious meanings ==
=== African spirituality ===
Cultural sociologist and professor Katrina Hazzard-Donald asserts that the "Ring Shout was imported from an intermediary religious form, the old Hoodoo religion: an early Americanization of a number of different African traditional religions. This was an intermediary religious form that developed among North American bondsmen prior to their widespread and in depth Christianization." Hazzard-Donald further compiled a list of eight spiritual traits that "an overwhelming majority of African captives" held when they were imported to the United States: 1) counter-clockwise sacred circle dancing, 2) ancestor reverence, 3) belief in the spiritual cause of malady, 4) water immersion, 5) spirit possession, 6) animal sacrifice, 7) naturopathic medicine, and 8) divination.

Hinson and Ferris described the ring shout as an "African-derived worship practice." They also highlighted that the bended-knee stance in the ring shout was common in African spiritual practices. Likewise, cultural historian Peter H. Wood asserted that the "knee-bone bend" that was observed in ring shouts came from the African belief that the bending of the knees meant that you were alive and that straight legs were for the dead. He further asserted that ring shouts began by enslaved Africans as a way to honor life and bless their labor in the fields. In addition to ring shout ceremonies being gatherings where enslaved Africans could seek comfort and relief from their everyday troubles, they were also a place where abolitionists, like Nat Turner, Denmark Vesey, and Gullah Jack could plot rebellions for freedom.

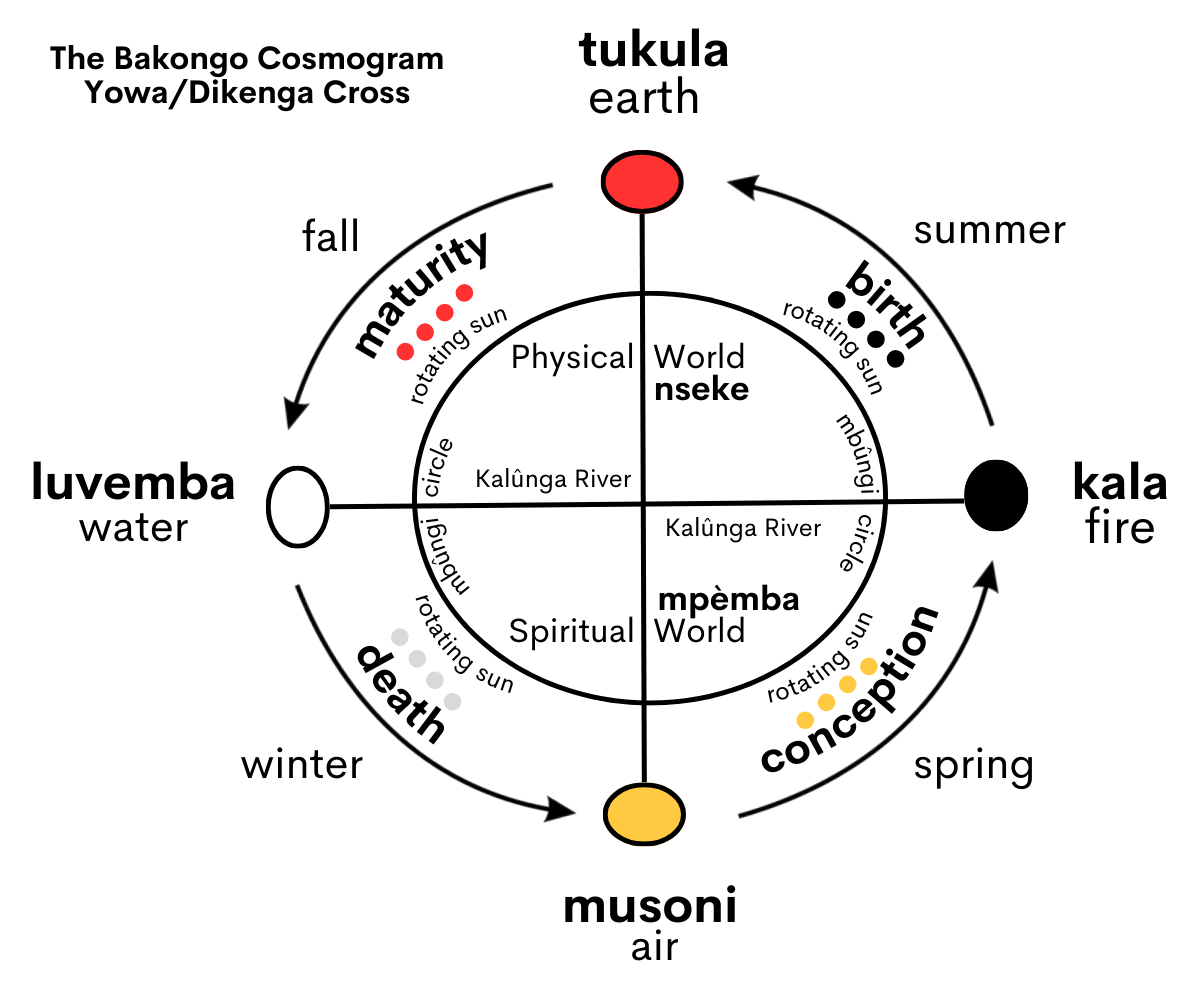
The Kongo cosmogram illustrated the counterclockwise moment of the four moments of the sun.

Some scholars, such as Africanist and art historian Robert Farris Thompson, also assert that the ring shout dance is specifically derived from Kongo counterclockwise dances that were performed in Angola and the Democratic Republic of the Congo to symbolize the sun circling the earth. Thompson further stated that the circle represented "the idea balancing of the vitality of the world of the living with the visionaries of the world of the dead," which also reflected the moving of souls on the Kongo cosmogram. Historian and Smithsonian Museum curator Elaine Nichols suggested that the ring shout developed as a form of "ground-writing," where worshippers drew symbols on the ground with their feet through dance to communicate with God and the ancestors. The circular symbols with four points were believed to be associated "with protective ancestral powers and can be traced back to Kongo religious beliefs, from Central Africa, in the four moments of the soul: birth, life, death, and rebirth." Philosopher and academic yonTande Whitney Vern Hunter described the ring shout as "an eighteenth century worship custom developed and practiced by enslaved Africans in the American South. Historically, the Ring Shout maintains an ancestral lineage connecting to the ring and circle dances of West-Central Africa."

In the 1800s, many observers assumed the ring shout as foreign in origin and not Christian. Black and white Northern teachers and missionaries who visited the Lowcountry during the American Civil War, described the practice as idol worship, savage, and barbaric.

==== Regional variations ====
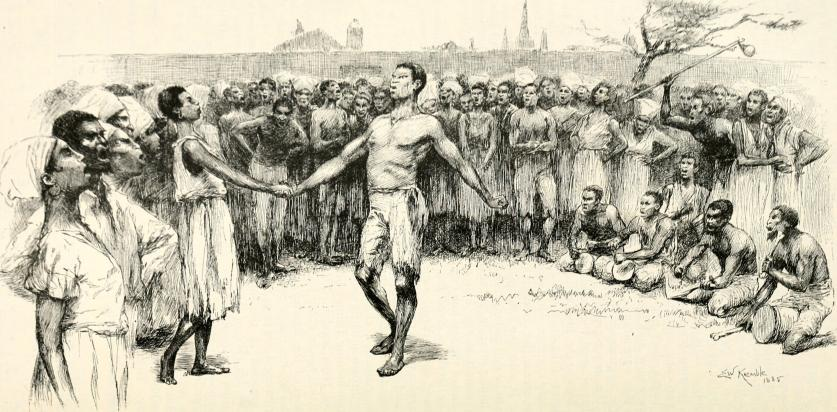
Dancing in Congo Square, 1886

Many scholars point to an African origin of the ring shout, suggesting that enslaved people developed the dance from their traditional African spiritual practices. According to Hazzard-Donald, "Like dance in West Africa, the African American Ring Shout was seen as a sacred enactment performed in a sacred context." Because the earliest accounts of the African American ring shout "do not locate the sacred circle in a Christian context," Hazzard-Donald maintained that it was from the "African sacred circle" that the ring shout was developed by African Americans. She also stated that this counter-clockwise, sacred circle dance "appears to have been done universally among African American bondsmen, and later among freedmen." The ring shout then evolved into various forms throughout the generations.

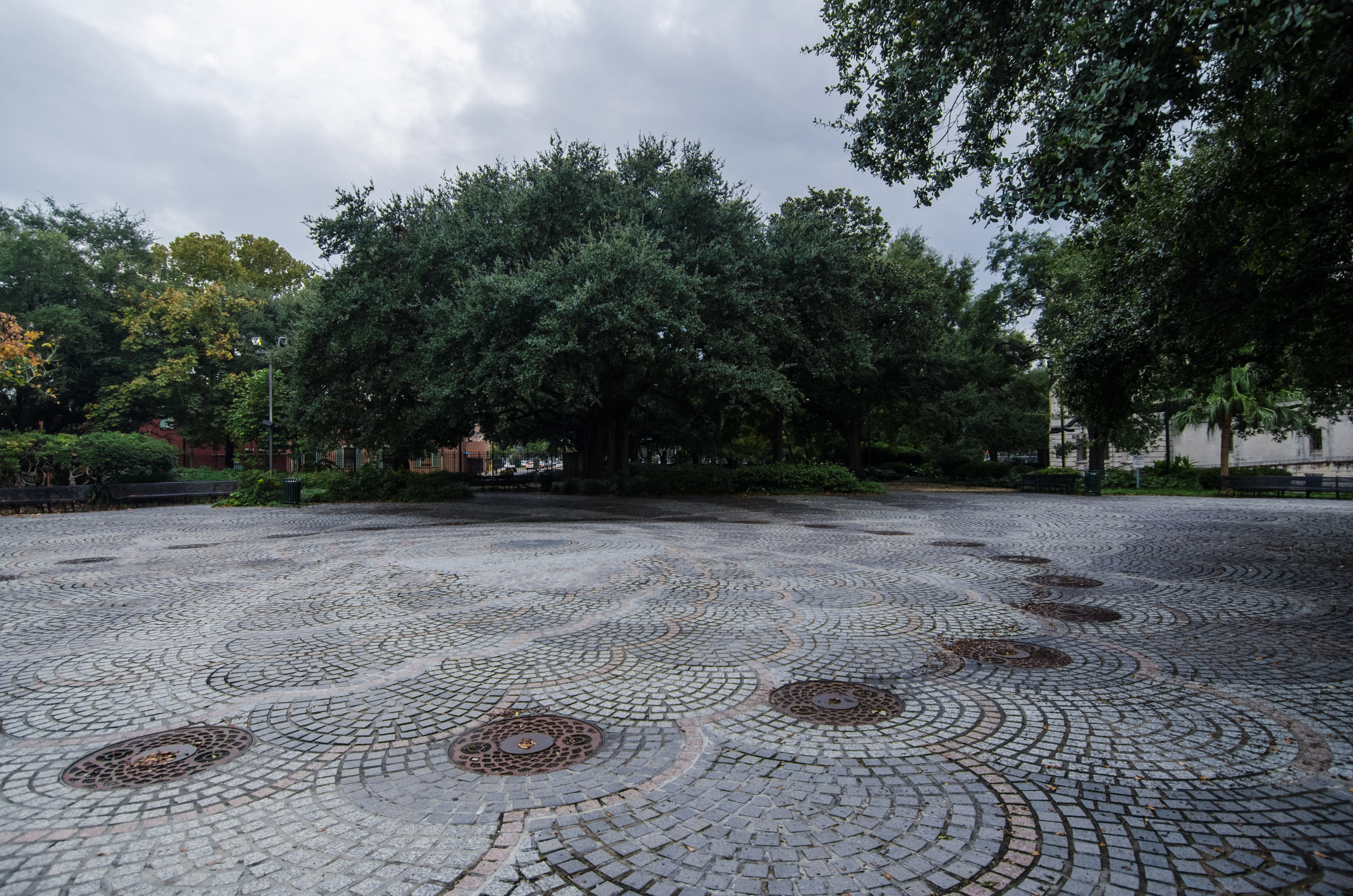
Mardi Gras Indians performed the ring shout at Congo Square.

According to the Louisiana Slave Database, which details the ethnicities and African origins of enslaved people who lived in Louisiana between 1719 and 1820, 35.4 percent of them belonged to the Bakongo and Ambundu ethnic groups from West-Central Africa, 10.9 percent were Mandinka, 7.4 percent were Mina from the Costa da Mina, 7.1 were Wolof from Senegambia, and 5.5 were Bambara people. Despite their cultural differences, they gathered in Congo Square on Sundays for worship, with the ring shout "[bringing] them together, transcending cultural barriers and hastening the creation of a pan-African cultural mix with numerous points of intersection."

Sharing the space of the Square, the "dusky dancers" grouped themselves by ethnicity and formed their own circles to perform the ring shout. "Each circle featured an 'orchestra' of drums, jawbones, and “a peculiar kind of banjo." Louisiana Voodoo rituals were integrated into the ring shout. Practitioners of Hoodoo practice the ring shout to commune with ancestral spirits. Ring shouts were sometimes held in honor of the dead at jazz funerals by the Mardi Gras Indians. Today, ring shouts in New Orleans are accompanied with musical bands which later influenced the second line parades.

During slavery and after emancipation, other African American communities practiced the ring shout during funerals, a tradition that is similar to West African burial rituals in Sierra Leone. Harriet Tubman attended a Black funeral in the South Carolina Lowcountry and they performed the ring shout which Tubman called a "spiritual shuffel." In the Sea Islands, Gullah Geechee people create music during the ring shout using wooden sticks and clapping their hands singing Christian spirituals. They also formed a circle and marched around a grave singing and shaking hands. A formerly enslaved African describes a clandestine funeral rite and the use of the sacred circle:

… I watch ‘em had a fewnul. I gits behine du bush an hide a watch an see wut dey does. Dey do in a long pruhcession tuh duh burryin groun and dey beat duh drums long duh way an deys ubmit duh body tuh duh groun. Den dey dance roun in a ring an dey motion wid duh hans. Dey sing duh body tuh duh brabe and den dey let it down an den dey succle roun in duh dance.

The Great Migration of Black people from the Lowcountry to New York and Chicago influenced culture in Northern African-African communities. Jazz piano and drumming became part of 1950s Harlem ring shouts, substituting the broomsticks that men used to rhythmically beat wooden floors. Authors Molefi Kete Asante and Ama Mazama say this about the different styles:

As the dance survived throughout three generations of enslavement, it took on different forms. There were also several rules established in an effort to keep the ring shout a part of African American culture. The ring shout could be danced in two forms— one form was performed in Georgia and South Carolina and the other in North Carolina and Virginia. The latter type was performed as a solo dance with onlookers doing verbal call-and-response, whereas the first form was performed as a group dance. Very early on the rules were established for the dance. One of the more important rules was the rule against the dancers’ crossing their legs or feet.

The exact meaning of the ring shout practiced by enslaved people is not entirely known as they kept their practices hidden from white observers. The song Steal Away and Pray served as a covert communication for enslaved fieldworkers in Texas, enabling them to organize prayer meetings and shouts discreetly, unseen by enslavers. Enslaved African Americans sang the spiritual Steal Away to Jesus to communicate news of secret prayer meetings and shout services to enslaved individuals on neighboring Georgia plantations. To avoid detection by plantation owners, the enslaved used wash pots to reduce the sound of their secret prayer and shout meetings. According to author Julia Smith, the iron pots were used as a tool for spiritual protection from African gods that correspond with iron.

According to civil rights activists, James Weldon Johnson, he described the ring shout as part of a continued African tradition where similar counterclockwise circle dances have been observed in Black communities in Haiti, the West Indies, and South America. Circle dancing was brought to America by way of the slave trade but underwent a process of diverse development in African diasporic communities in the Americas. Shouting serves as a means for individual and cultural expression.

=== Christian ===
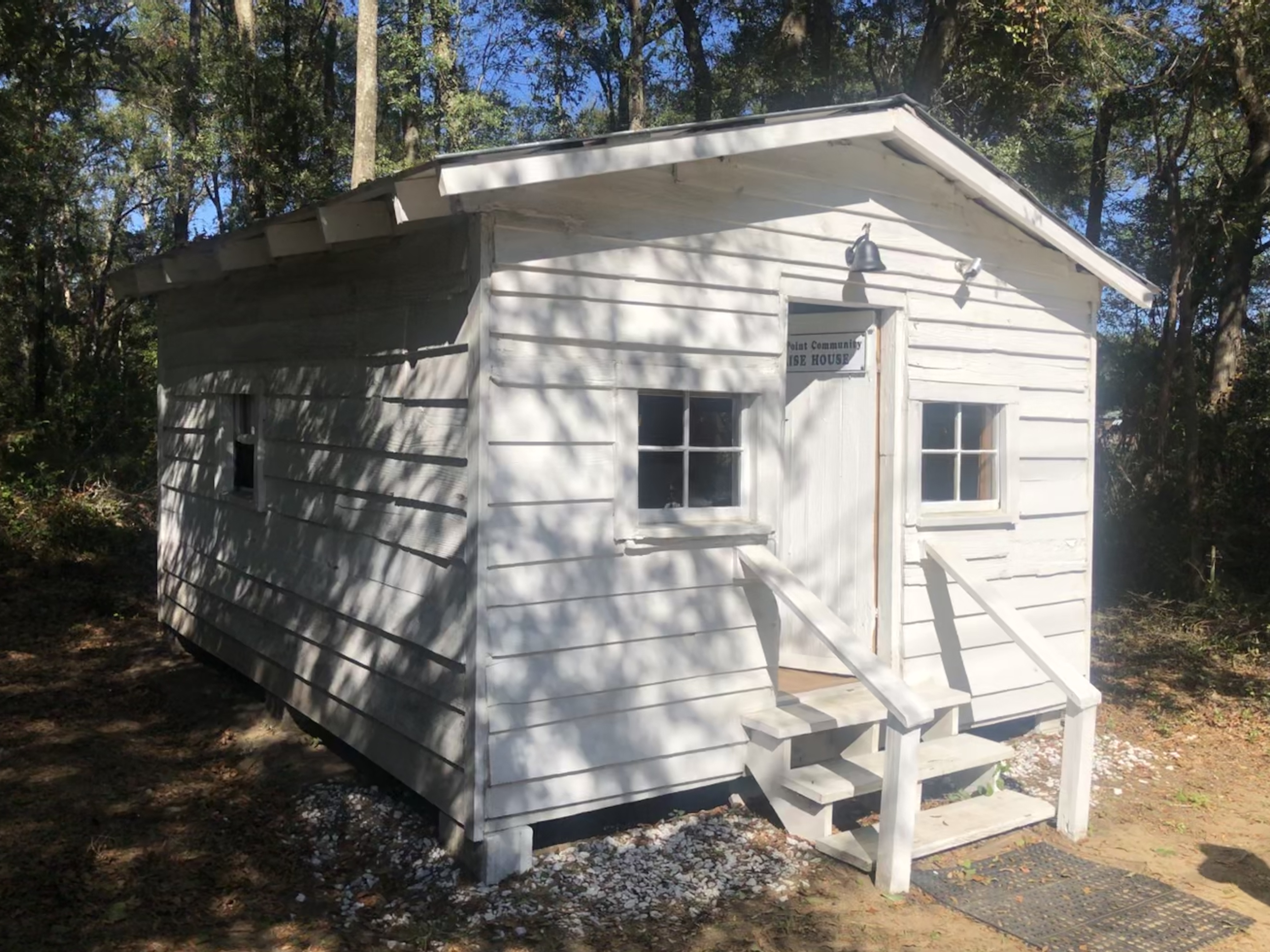
During slavery and after emancipation, ring shouts were practiced in praise houses.

During the antebellum period, enslaved Christians in South Carolina constructed praise houses. Serving as symbols of resistance to the slaveholders’ oppressive Christianity, these small wooden structures demonstrated the religion of the enslaved. Enslaved Christians favored additional space over altars, kneelers, pulpits, and chairs and pews because it provided more room to perform the ring shouts. These shouts have been identified as surviving remnants of African religious rhythm and dance. During the shout, the manifestation of the one God, the Holy Spirit, is brought down into the church. Historian John Blassingame researched through the narratives of former slaves and wrote about the religious beliefs of the enslaved on plantations. Enslaved people performed the ring shout to "have a joyful noise unto the God of their salvation." The Oxford Handbook of Methodist Studies notes the use of the ring shout among Methodists in instances where individuals experienced the New Birth:

The last dimension was the use of hymn singing as part of more complex rituals to create dramatic conversion experiences. One such ritual was the ring shout. Probably beginning in the simple practice of gathering around mourners to pray, the ring shout eventually developed into a form of circular singing, dancing, praying, and shouting (Taves 1999: 99–101). The ring shout was stylized musical ritual used to evoke religious experience. Anglicans in America realized the competition of Methodist hymn singing and sometimes sought to respond by introducing Methodist hymns into parish worship (Cameron 1985: 17).

In other areas of the South, slaves held church services in their praise houses because some Methodist ministers disapproved of enslaved peoples shouts and dances. Although praise houses functioned as places of worship on the plantation, their main purpose was to limit enslaved Africans’ interactions with people from other plantations. The praise house became a local community hub for the enslaved, symbolizing their form of religious and cultural expression. According to historian Joseph Opala, the Gullah Geechee ring shout was created by the enslaved:

The Gullah became Christians, for instance, but their style of worship reflected their African heritage. In slavery days they developed a ceremony called "ring shout" in which participants danced in a ritual fashion in a circle amidst the rhythmical pounding of sticks and then, at the culminating moment, experienced possession by the Holy Spirit while shouting expressions of praise and thanksgiving.

In the present day, professor YaTande Whitney Hunter asserts that "groups that sustain the Ring Shout as 'authentic' to the Gullah-Geechee culture are mostly Christian based in their religious affiliation". According to Johnson, "The continued observance of the ring shout ritual throughout the slave community, especially among those 'converted' to Christianity, demonstrates beyond question the tenacious power and influence of the slaves' African cultural inheritance." Erricker further stated that the Black Pentecostal Church echoed from "the African religious heritage" through the ring shout. That African spiritual connectedness that sprang into existence with practices such as the ring shout influenced the creation of Hoodoo and then the Hoodoo Christian Church, "where Hoodoonized Christianity would flourish among some Black congregations that fused Christianity with Hoodoo rituals."

==== "Seeking Jesus" ====
During slavery and after emancipation, young adults from the Sea Islands took part in a spiritual initiation. Young women and men took part in seeking, with trusted elderly women served as spiritual mothers to guide them on their spiritual journery. In Gullah Geechee communities, only praise house members could take part in the sacred circle dance and adults taught the tradition to their children.

Anthropologist Alonzo Johnson, who referred to ring shouts as "Africa-wide rituals," described an account in 1850 at a Christian camp meeting near Charleston, South Carolina by a European traveler who witnessed circles of enslaved women dancing the holy dance and vast tents "of all imaginable forms and colours" positioned in a circle. In these revivals, Christians would incorporate the act of "seeking Jesus" into existing Gullah-Geechee manifestations of African spiritual cultures like the ring shout, a intricate rite in the developing Black Christian culture.

== Origin and history ==
=== Plantation era ===
According to historian Joseph E. Holloway, the ring shout began as a sacred dance among the Kongo people in Central Africa. The transatlantic slave trade resulted in Congolese and Angolans representing about 39% of the enslaved population of Charleston, South Carolina between 1716 and 1807. Thus, Central Africans played a significant role in the development of Gullah-Geechee culture and spiritual traditions. African ceremonial and religious dances persisted and blended with Christianity during slavery in the American South that was practiced during the colonial period. For enslaved and free African Americans, the ring shout carried different interpretations. For some Black individuals, the ring shout served as a way to commune with ancestral spirits, while for others, it was a way to connect with the Christian deity. Historian Sterling Stuckey says this of the ring shout:

Wherever in Africa the counterclockwise dance ceremony was performed – it is called the ring shout in North America – the dancing and singing were directed towards the ancestors and gods, the tempo and revolution of the cirlce quickening during the course of movement. The ring in which Africans danced and sang is the key to understanding the means by which they achieved onenness in America.

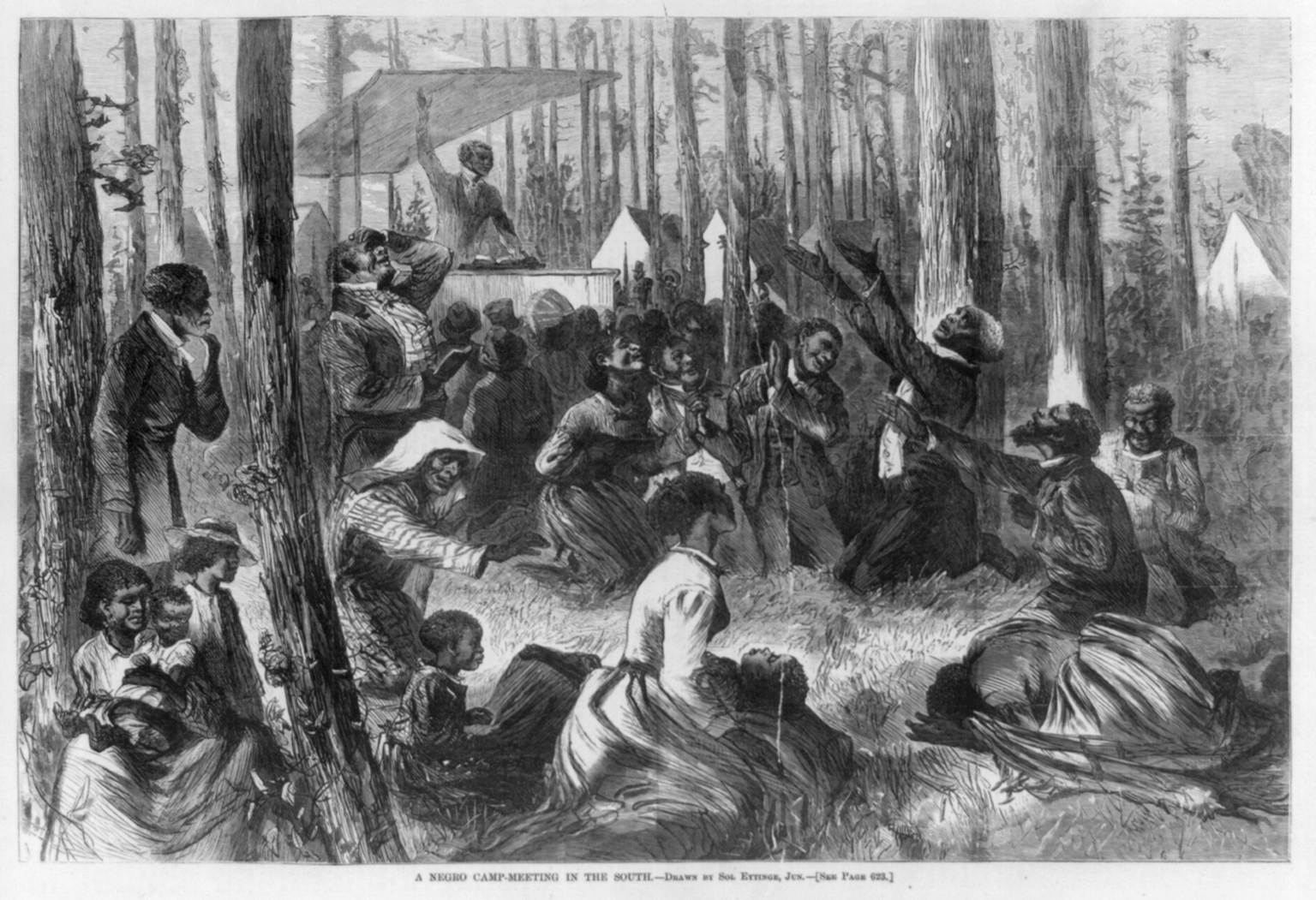
During slavery, enslaved and free African Americans practiced the ring shout in secret locations called hush harbors.

Albert J. Raboteau, a historian who focused on African-American religions, noted that the ring shout was not limited to church camp meetings and was practiced within enslaved communities on South Carolina and Georgia rice and cotton plantations. The ring shout practiced among the enslaved resulted in spirit possession and became a new outlet for African spirit possession, which was reinterpreted through a Christian lens. The ring shout was secretly practiced by the enslaved in locations known as hush harbors during slavery in the Southern United States. Author Bernard E. Powers asserts that the blending of African religious traditions and Christianity resulted in an Africanization of Christianity which white and some Black religious leaders denounced the ring shout as "paganism." White plantation owners and government officials in New Orleans, Louisiana passed slave laws in 1786 and in the 1830s that made it illegal for enslaved people to practice the ring shout and other African-derived dances. White residents of New Orleans feared large congregations of enslaved individuals, suspecting that drumming and dancing might incite a slave revolt. Despite 18th and 19th century slave laws, the practice was observed in Black churches in the 1850s in New Orleans.

Black New Orleanians practiced the ring shout at Congo Square and the shout was mostly secular and not synchronized with Christianity. "There, they played music and danced in the form of a ring shout, with small groups of instrumentalists, singers, and dancers arranging themselves into a circle surrounding a rotating cast of dancers. Historians and musicologists have pointed to the Congo Square dances and their persistence until the eve of the Civil War as crucial to the establishment of Africanized cultural traditions in New Orleans," according to professor and ethnomusicologist Matt Sakakeeny. Onlookers also noted that Black people incorporated Louisiana Voodoo rituals with the ring shout. In his autobiography, A.M.E. Bishop Daniel Alexander Payne observed that some white clergymen referred to the ring shout as a "Voudoo Dance." Author Jason Young suggests that by the 19th century, praise houses and African American religious traditions were perceived by white plantation owners a rebellious practice that inspired the enslaved to resist slavery. Nat Turner’s 1831 slave revolt, which began during a religious service, ended with his capture and death. After the rebellion, many Virginia slaveholders forbade their slaves to gather at praise houses. In North Carolina, former slave Harriet Jacobs wrote in her narrative that after Nat Turner's rebellion, a praise house the slaves attended was demolished, and they were forced to attend the church of their enslaver. As the ring shout became prominent among African Americans, many denounced the ring shout because of its connections to conjuring, because some believed it comes from non-Christian elements.

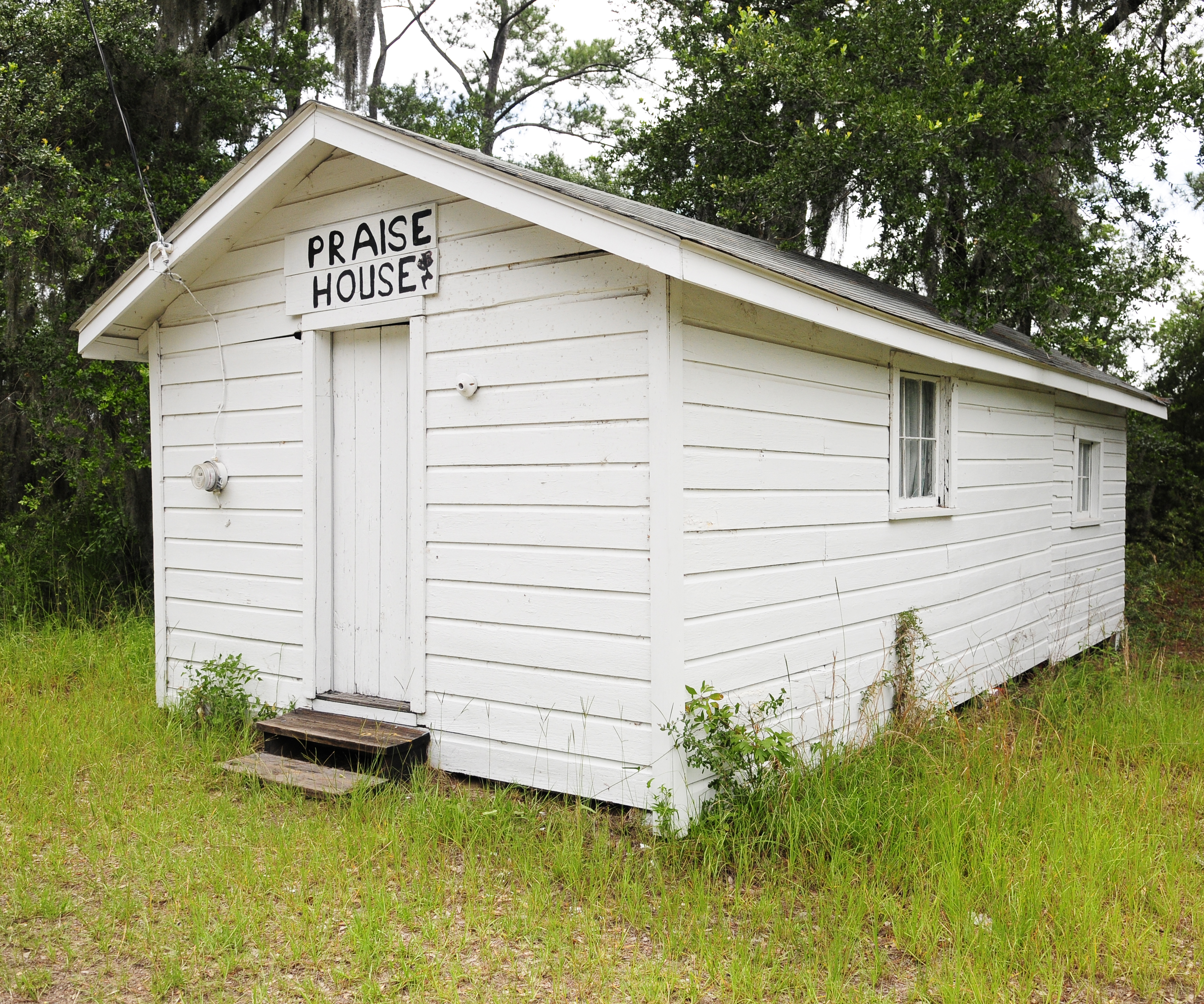
In the South Carolina Lowcountry enslaved Gullah Geechee people practiced the ring shout in praise houses.

Author Gilbert Chase writes that enslaved people modified the ring shout due to disapproval from their slaveholders. Chase writes: "The character of the 'ring shout' could be modified by circumstances. For example, when straightlaced masters in North America forbade their slaves to dance, the latter would move as fast as they could in the 'ring shout' and still give the appearance that they were not dancing.'" Many Protestant churches frowned upon the shout dance. When enslaved people combined African religious practices and Christianity, slaveholders felt they were debasing the religion. The disapproval of the ring shout by slaveholders and the passage of slave codes resulted in enslaved African Americans to conduct the ring shout in secret places called invisible churches or hush harbors. The enslaved were forced to attend the churches of white plantation owners. Sylvia King, an enslaved woman in Texas, recounted how she and other enslaved people would flee into the woods after attending their enslavers’ church services to practice the ring shout in secret. Some slaveholders hid in the woods and watched the enslaved perform the ring shout and misinterpreted what they saw and described the practice as sexual and sinful, while white Christians described the shout as barbaric.

In the ring shout, African cultural elements like call-and-response, hand clapping, and foot shuffling are present, along with its spiritual meaning, all reinterpreted within a Christian context by enslaved and free African Americans. This practice later extended to other Black Christian groups, including Methodists and Baptists. Mardi Gras Indians in New Orleans also practice the ring shout to commune with spirits. African Americans in New Orleans perform the ring shout during funerals and the shout developed into the New Orleans tradition of second lines dancing. Ring shouts were sometimes held in honor of the dead. This custom has been practiced by traditional bands of carnival revelers in New Orleans. Other Black communities practiced the ring shout at funerals, a tradition from West African burial rituals, continued after emancipation.

=== Christian church camp meetings ===
African Americans influenced the worship services in Methodist churches.

Historian Anne Taves theorized the beginning of the ring shout may have been in Holiness Methodist camp meetings. Sandra Jean Graham, a professor of music, notes that "African Americans and some whites shared similarly emotional styles of worship" and referenced Wesleyan Methodist minister John Watson's observations, who noted that "the two groups' worship styles influenced each other". Religion professor Clive Erricker asserted that the ring shout practiced by Black Christians is "a spiritual exercise to prepare people for conversion or another by God. The ring-shout could also be a prayer form resembling the rehearsal of God acts in an enacted prayer; these liturgical re-enactments of biblical events included a Jericho march, a re-enactment of 'Joshua's army marching around the walls Jericho' or an Exodus march, that marching of Israel out of Egypt." A number of camp meetings of the holiness movement were interracial as denominations such as the Church of God taught that entire sanctification freed a person from prejudice. John Watson, who criticized fellow Methodists for "shouting, leaping and jumping, and other outward signs of needless emotions", noted that the ring shout "visibly affected the religious manners of some whites." At the camp meetings, "50 to 60 people crowd into one tent, after the public devotions had closed, and there continue the whole night, singing tune after tune".

On the other hand, authors Sylvia Frey and Betty Woods research asserts that African church members brought a form of the holy dance to Methodist camp meetings which many white Methodists were not familiar with the practice due to the West African origins of hand clapping, shuffling of the feet, and shout songs sung by the enslaved on plantations. The authors write that white Methodist church members disapproval of the Africans incorporating religious and secular songs. Black and white methodists developed different styles of religious worship. Frey and Woods say this of the ring shout: "However, the first motions of the holy dance apparently hand clapping, foot stomping, and leaping, which first appeared during the Virginia revivals. None of these acts were unique to West Africans, but because they were not a regular part of the white aesthetic experience, they were greatly altered or they disappeared from the white repertoires of religious expression once acceptability of such behaviors declined." Taves also noted that the practice of "song, dance, shouting and preaching in syncopated styles, clapping, and falling out slain in the spirit," was influenced by the African members in Methodist churches. The ring shout is believed to have then gained ground among Methodists of the holiness movement.

=== Scholarly research ===
Sociolinguist and researcher Lorenzo Dow Turner theorized that the ritual may have originated among enslaved Muslims from West Africa as an imitation of tawaf, the mass procession around the Kaaba that is an essential part of the Hajj. If so, he proposed that the word shout may come from Arabic shawṭ, which means in this context a single circumambulation of the Kaaba.

== Influence ==
Professor Emeritus of history Sterling Stuckey asserted that ring shout was a unifying element of Africans in the American colonies, from which field hollers, work songs, and spirituals evolved, followed by blues and jazz. Music educator, archivist, and historian Samuel A. Floyd Jr. further contended that many of the stylistic elements observed during the ring shout later laid the foundations of various Black music styles developed during the nineteenth and twentieth centuries. According to Floyd, "...all of the defining elements of black music are present in the ring...".

These basic elements of ring shouts included calls, cries, and hollers; blue notes; call-and-response; and various rhythmic aspects. Examples of Black music that would evolve from the ring include, but are not limited to, Afro-American burial music of New Orleans, the Blues, the Afro-American Symphony, as well as the music that has accompanied various dance forms also present in Afro-American culture.

The ring shout continues today in Georgia with the McIntosh County Shouters.

== In popular culture ==
- Ring Shout, is the title of a historical, Southern Gothic fantasy novella by P. Djèlí Clark.
- In Queen Sugar S7E3 "Slowly and Always Irregularly," Nova organized a traditional ring shout to call upon the souls of the massacred ancestors whose remains were found on her family's farm and honor their lives.

== See also ==
- Engolo
- Joseph Opala
- Juba dance
- Kalunga line
- Maculelê (stick dance)
- Set de flo'
- Stick dance (African American)
- The Shout

== Bibliography ==
- Diouf, Sylviane (1998). Servants of Allah: African Muslims Enslaved in the Americas. New York: New York University Press. ISBN 0-8147-1905-8.
- Floyd, Samuel A. Jr. (2002). "Ring Shout! Literary Studies, Historical Studies, and Black Music Inquiry". Black Music Research Journal. 22 (Supplement): 49–70. doi:10.2307/1519943. JSTOR 1519943.
- Hazzard-Donald, Katrina (2013). Mojo Workin': The Old African American Hoodoo System. University of Illinois Press. ISBN 9780252094460.
- Hunter, yaTande Whitney V. (1 December 2023) [August 2023]. "The "Ring Shout": A Corporeal Conjuring of Black-Togetherness". Dance Research Journal. 55 (2): 44–57 – via Cambridge University Press.
- Parrish, Lydia (1992) [1942]. Slave Songs of the Georgia Islands. Athens, GA: University of Georgia Press. ISBN 9780820313979. OCLC 24107626.
- Raboteau, Albert J. (7 October 2004). Slave Religion: The "Invisible Institution" in the Antebellum South. Oxford University Press. ISBN 9780198020318.
- Turner, Lorenzo Dow (1969) [1949]. Africanisms in the Gullah Dialect. New York: Arno Press. OCLC 6119.
