= Griffin Lotson =

American historian

- Born: Griffin Lotson; Crescent, Georgia, U.S.
- Occupations: Historian; Cultural preservationist; Community leader
- Years active: –present
- Known for: Vice‑Chairman of the Gullah Geechee Cultural Heritage Corridor Commission; Preserving Gullah‑Geechee culture; Managing Geechee Gullah Ring Shouters
- Title: Commissioner (Emeritus), Gullah Geechee Cultural Heritage Corridor Commission

Griffin Lotson (born June 20, 1954) is an African-American historian, born in Crescent, Georgia. He is a seventh-generation Gullah Geechee. He serves as a councilman and the mayor pro-tem in Darien, Georgia. He also manages the Geechee Gullah Ring Shouters. He is the national Federal Government vice-chairman and former treasurer of the federal Gullah Geechee Cultural Heritage Corridor Commission.

== Early life ==
Lotson is a Gullah Geechee African-American descendant. He was born in Crescent, Georgia, and grew up in Darien, Georgia doing ring shout with his grandfather. In his childhood, he attended the congregation of Carneghan Emanuel Baptist Church & Sams Memorial Church Of God In Christ, where he heard people sing "Come by Here" famously known as kumbaya a hymn that was a call to those who are oppressed, sick, or were at the verge of dying.

== Career ==
Lotson got a job in the federal government during his teenage and moved to Washington. At the age of 40, he returned to Georgia after he realized the importance of promoting and preserving his ancestral culture. He dedicated his time to researching Gullah Geechee's history.

He is the manager of Geechee Gullah Ring Shouters, a councilman and the mayor pro-tem in Darien. He also serves as the national vice-chairman and was former treasurer of the federal Gullah Geechee Cultural Heritage Corridor Commission and CEO of Sams Memorial Community Economic Development.

=== Kumbaya ===
Lotson was hired as a consultant for a scene in the History Channel's 2016 "Roots" series. He also frequently leads cultural tours and riverboat cruises. He is deeply involved in the research of the history of "Kumbaya." In 2011, he authored a book about it. He also raises funds to archive the history of his ancestral culture. Lotson suggested Sen. William Ligon to draft a resolution with an emphasis on the song, 'Kumbaya,' after which it was recognized as Georgia's first state historical song.

=== Ring Shouting ===
Griffin Lotson is the manager of Geechee Gullah Ring Shouters. Ring shout is the oldest-known type of black performance in North America. It was a practice among Gullah Geechee where the slaves moved in a circle, making noise. He is trying to make Ring Shouting common among young Americans. In 2011, Lotson arranged a ring shout consisting of 250 people in Washington. It was the highest number of people simultaneously performing a ring shout at a single venue, and it got featured in the Guinness Book of World Records. He also taught this practice to professional dancers. Lotson took the group to Sierra Leone in January 2019. The group also performs in the Carrie Mae Weems exhibit on Gullah culture.
