= Mary Jackson (artist) =

American fiber artist

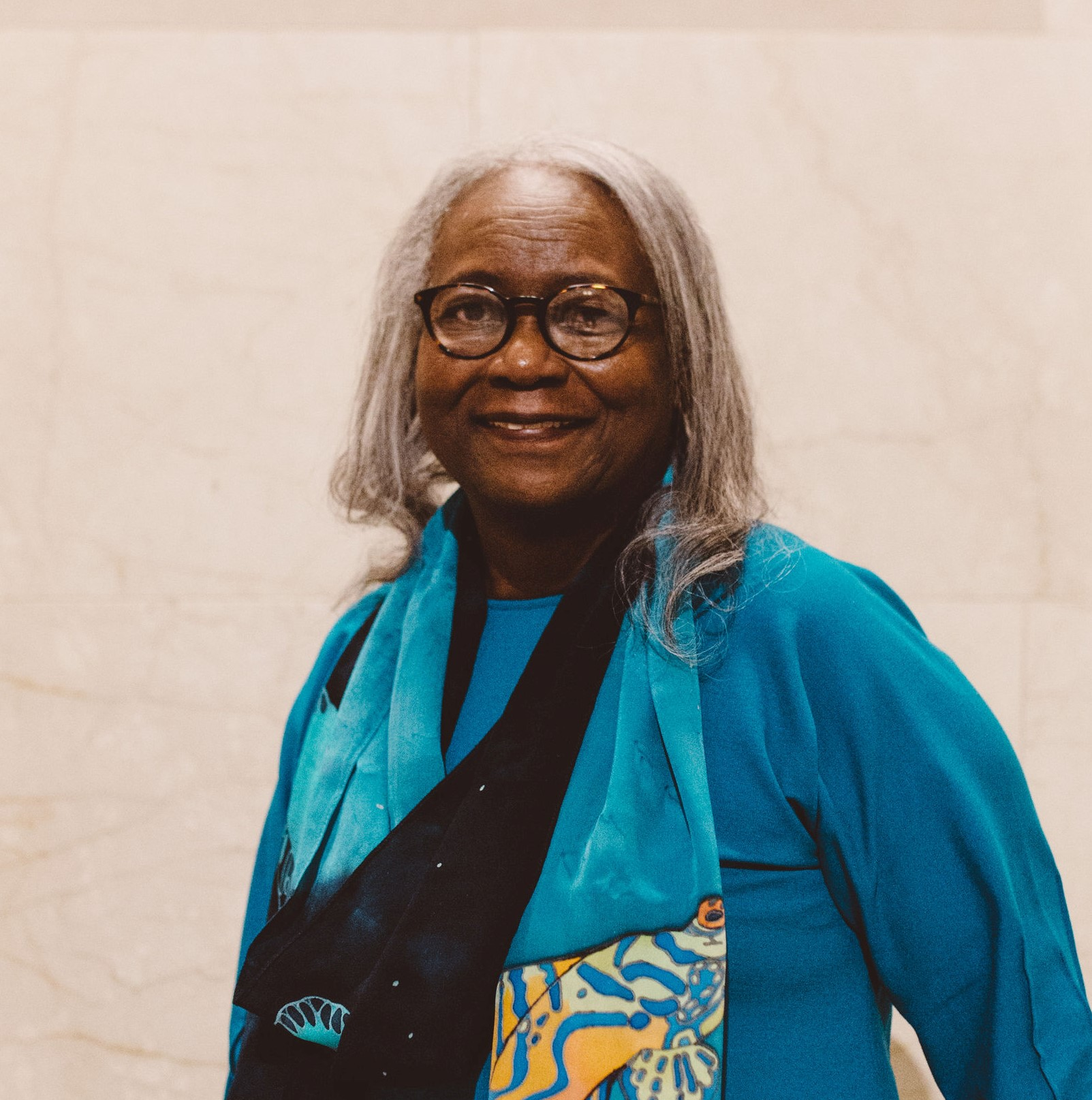
- Jackson in 2018
- Born: February 15, 1945 (age 81); Mount Pleasant, South Carolina
- Known for: Basketmaking, weaving
- Spouse: Stoney Jackson
- Awards: Macarthur Genius Grant (2008)

Mary Jackson (born 1945) is an African American fiber artist. She is best known for her sweetgrass basket weaving using traditional methods combined with contemporary designs. A native of coastal South Carolina and a descendant of generations of Gullah basket weavers, Jackson was awarded a MacArthur Foundation fellowship in 2008 for "pushing the tradition in stunning new directions." Mary Jackson is a recipient of a 2010 National Heritage Fellowship from the National Endowment for the Arts.

== Biography ==
Jackson was born on February 15, 1945. She grew up in the Gullah community of Mount Pleasant, just outside of Charleston, South Carolina. Taught by her mother and grandmother, Jackson started making sweetgrass baskets at the age of four. The tradition and technique of sweetgrass basket weaving has been passed down from one generation to the next, originating with the West African slaves who were brought to coastal South Carolina in the early 1700s.

During her childhood, Jackson, along with her siblings and cousins would gather in her grandmother's yard to help weave baskets. After graduating from high school, Jackson moved to New York City, where she attended secretarial school and went on to work for the Metropolitan Insurance Company. Jackson lived in New York for ten years. While in New York city, she would visit museums and art galleries and started to collect contemporary paintings and sculptures.

Jackson returned to South Carolina in 1972 and continued to work as a secretary. Jackson learned from family and friends that the sweetgrass used in basketmaking was starting to disappear. Through her work at the Charleston Community Center, she was able to get permission from local landowners to allow the harvesting of sweetgrass by local basketmakers on land waiting to be developed.

In the 1970s, Jackson had to stop working to stay home with her eighteen-month-old son who had chronic asthma. While at home, she started to work on baskets again and would sell her baskets at the city market in Charleston. During this time, Jackson started to create her own designs. Using sweetgrass, palmetto, pine needles, and bulrush in her work, Jackson's finely crafted and innovative baskets started to attract attention. She was invited to exhibit her baskets at the Smithsonian Craft Show in 1984. That event became a turning point in Jackson's career.

Jackson is the recipient of numerous awards, including the prestigious MacArthur genius grant in 2008. Her baskets have been exhibited at the Smithsonian American Art Museum, The White House Collection of American Crafts, the Museum of Arts and Design in New York, the Museum of Fine Arts in Boston, the Museum of African American History in Detroit, and the National Museum of African American History and Culture.

As founding president of the Mount Pleasant Sweetgrass Basket Makers Association, Jackson continues to work with local basketmakers, government officials, preservationists, and horticulturalists in salvaging grasses from sites planned for development and replanting them on protected lands.

She is still making Sweetgrass baskets that come out of a tradition that has been passed down from her ancestors. These baskets originated in West Africa, and brought to America by slaves. Jackson is currently living in Charleston with her husband, Stoney. Her studio and showroom is located on Johns Island.

== Awards and honors ==
- 1993 Lifetime Achievement Award from the National Museum for Women in the Arts
- 2008 MacArthur Genius Grant
- 2008 United States Artists Donnelley Fellowship
- 2008 Environmental Stewardship Award of Achievement from the South Carolina Aquarium
- 2009 Honorary Doctorate of Humane Letters, College of Charleston
- 2010 National Heritage Fellowship from the National Endowment for the Arts
- 2018 College of Fellows, American Craft Council
