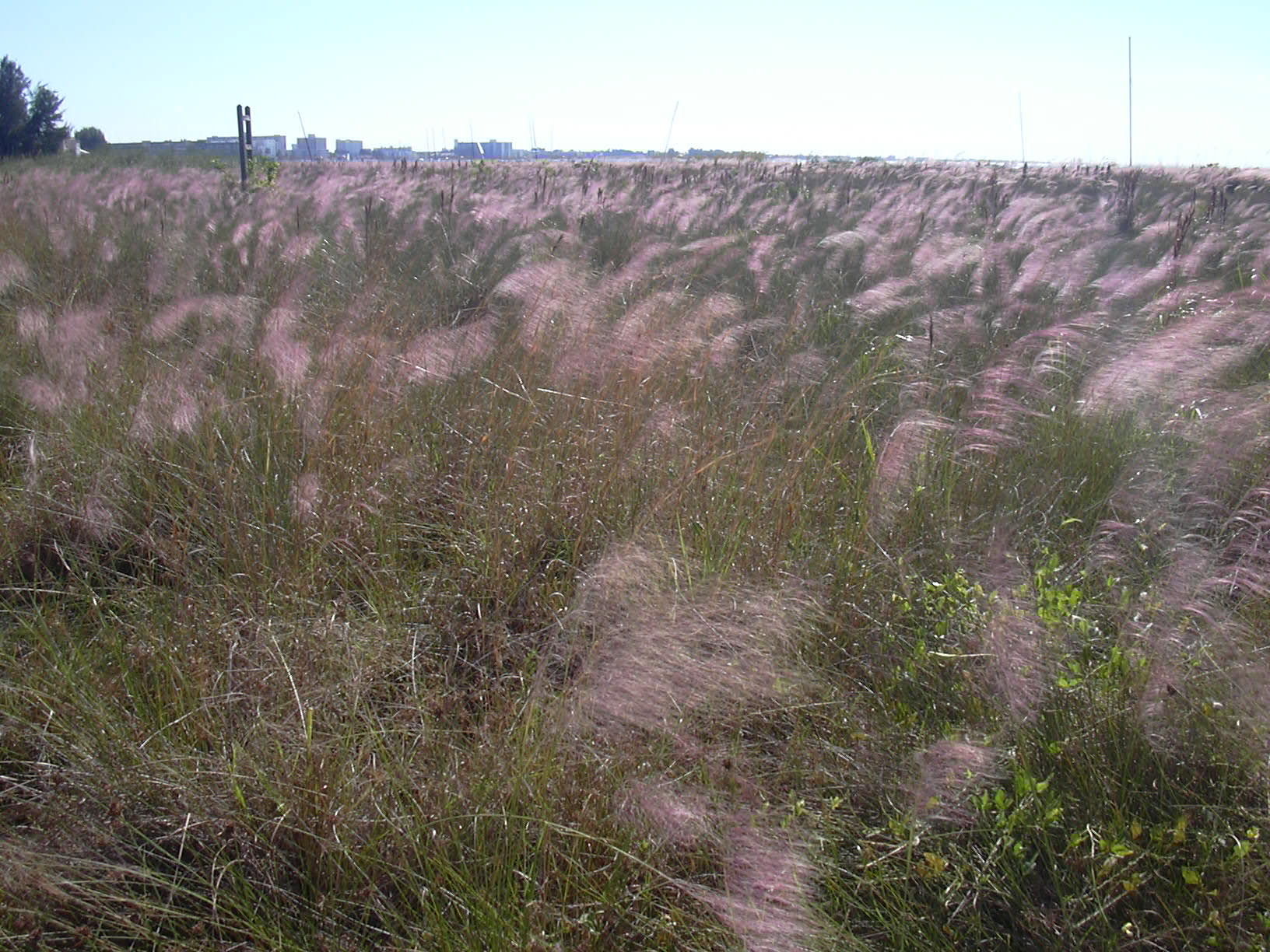

Conservation status
- Secure (NatureServe)

Scientific classification
- Kingdom: Plantae
- Clade: Embryophytes
- Clade: Tracheophytes
- Clade: Spermatophytes
- Clade: Angiosperms
- Clade: Monocots
- Clade: Commelinids
- Order: Poales
- Family: Poaceae
- Subfamily: Chloridoideae
- Genus: Muhlenbergia
- Species: M. sericea

Binomial name
- Muhlenbergia sericea (Michx.) P.M.Peterson

Synonyms
- Agrostis sericea (Michx.) Elliott; Muhlenbergia filipes M.A.Curtis; Podosemum filipes (M.A.Curtis) Bush; Polypogon sericeus (Michx.) Spreng.; Stipa sericea Michx.; Muhlenbergia capillaris var. filipes (M.A.Curtis) Beal

= Muhlenbergia sericea =

Species of flowering plant

Muhlenbergia sericea, synonym Muhlenbergia filipes, known as gulf hairawn muhly or sweetgrass, is a species of grass in the family Poaceae. It is native to the Southeastern United States (Alabama, Florida, Georgia, Louisiana, Mississippi, North Carolina, South Carolina, and Texas).

== Description ==
Sweetgrass is a perennial grass. It grows in clumps, with stems sometimes reaching as high as 120 centimetres (47 in). Most of the growth happens during spring and summer. The foliage is yellow-green. In the autumn, it produces large (30–70 cm long by 20–30 cm wide) effuse inflorescences (clusters on a stalk) of tiny red and purple spikelets (the type of flower seen in grasses). It produces purple seeds weight about a third of a milligram. Propagation is by seed or sprigging.

Sweetgrass is neither shade tolerant or drought tolerant, but it is fire tolerant and salt-tolerant. With a minimum temperature of 7 °F (−14 °C), it can tolerate freezing temperatures.

== Uses ==
=== Seminole basketry ===
Among Florida's Seminole People, sweetgrass was the most commonly used material for basket weaving. These baskets were often sold in tourist gift shops. In recent years, sweetgrass is becoming harder to find in South Florida. It is now only harvested during certain times of the year and in just a few locations.

=== African American arts ===
This grass has historical importance in South Carolina, where it has been used for basket weaving. African Americans from the Gullah tradition in the South Carolina Lowcountry still weave artistic baskets using this native grass.
