= Gullah Jack =

African American folk hero and conjurer

- Born: Date unknown Portuguese Angola
- Died: July 12, 1822; South Carolina, United States
- Status: Deceased
- Penalty: Death by hanging

Gullah Jack (died July 12, 1822), also known as Couter Jack and sometimes referred to as "Gullah" Jack Pritchard, was an African Methodist and Hoodoo conjurer whom Paul Pritchard enslaved in Charleston, South Carolina.

== Background ==
Little is known about his background, except that he was of Angolan origin and was shipped from Zanzibar to America under Zephaniah Kingsley's direction. He was sent first to Florida, to the Kingsley Plantation. However, in 1812 after a Seminole raid on the Kingsley Plantation, he escaped to Charleston, South Carolina, where he was eventually purchased by Paul Pritchard in 1821.

== Role in the 1822 Slave Revolt ==
Gullah Jack is known for his role as a co-conspirator, along with Denmark Vesey, in planning the rebellion that would become known as Denmark Vesey's slave conspiracy in 1822. Both Vesey and Gullah Jack were involved in some capacity with the AME Church in Charleston. It was at the AME Church that Vesey recruited Gullah Jack for his planned uprising in Charleston.

Using his Africa-based influences, Gullah Jack was crucial in recruiting African-born enslaved people as soldiers and provided them with charms as protection against the "buckra" (whites). He is also said to have used his spiritual powers to terrify others into keeping silent about the conspiracy. Historians believe Jack's strong African culture, contrasted against Vesey's preaching, helped attract many of the enslaved people that joined the revolt.

The Vesey plot involved taking over the state armory to arm enslaved people from rural areas and the local sea islands, who would rise and assist the others in revolt. The enslaved people would then kill the whites of Charleston, take the city, and finally use the city's ships to escape, supposedly, to Haiti, where enslaved people had overthrown the white government and now ruled.

Eventually, the Vesey plot was leaked by other enslaved people who were coerced into confession. Gullah Jack was arrested for his part in the plot on July 5, 1822, and was tried for his role in the planning, along with 130 others. Ultimately, South Carolina authorities hanged Vesey, Gullah Jack, and 34 other leading conspirators.

== Bibliography ==
- Rodriguez, Junius P., The Historical encyclopedia of world slavery, Volume 1; Volume 7, ABC-CLIO, 1997, ISBN 0-87436-885-5
