= Retreat House and Dock =

Historic dormitory in the Penn School Historic District

- U.S. National Register of Historic Places
- U.S. Historic district – Contributing property
- U.S. National Historic Landmark District – Contributing property
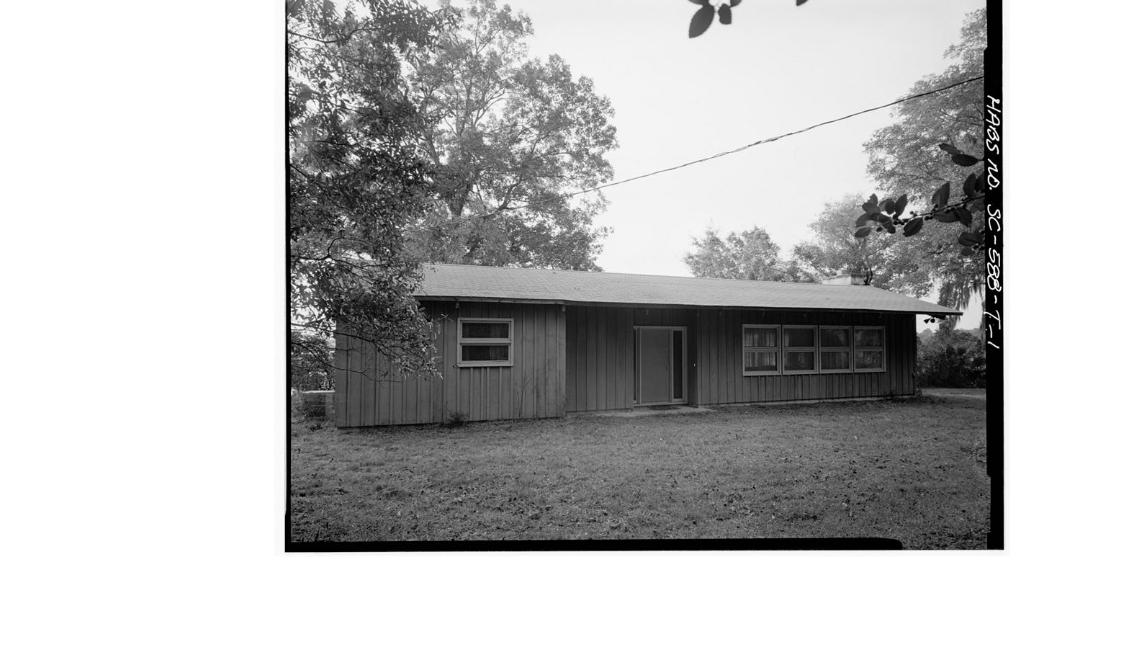
- Retreat House

- Location within South Carolina Location within the United States
- Nearest city: St. Helena Island, South Carolina
- Coordinates: 32.38830°N 80.57530°W
- Area: 47 acres (19 ha)
- Built: 1855
- Part of: Penn School Historic District (ID74001824)
- NRHP reference No.: 74001824

Significant dates
- Designated CP: September 9, 1974
- Designated NHLDCP: December 2, 1974

The Retreat House and Dock of Penn Center, formerly known as Penn School, was built in 1968, the year Dr. Martin Luther King, Jr. was killed. Plans were for him to have his meetings there rather than the smaller Gantt Cottage he had been staying at. It faces a body of water, a cove of Capers Creek, which is a place for meditation and relaxation for Penn Center's guests. The Retreat House replaced the Palmetto Cottage built in 1920 which was formerly located at this site but was destroyed by fire in the 1950s. The Retreat House and Dock was however used by Dr. Martin Luther King, Jr.'s associates during the Charleston Hospital Strike of 1969.

== Gallery ==
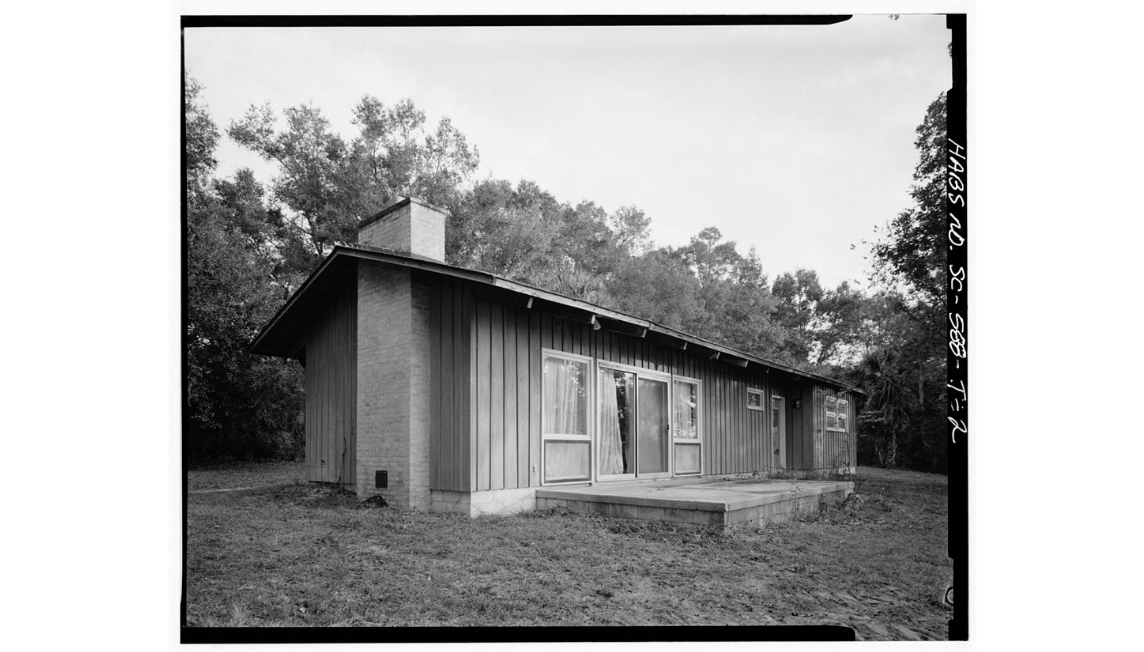
West (Rear, Facing Water Front) and North Side Elevation - Retreat House

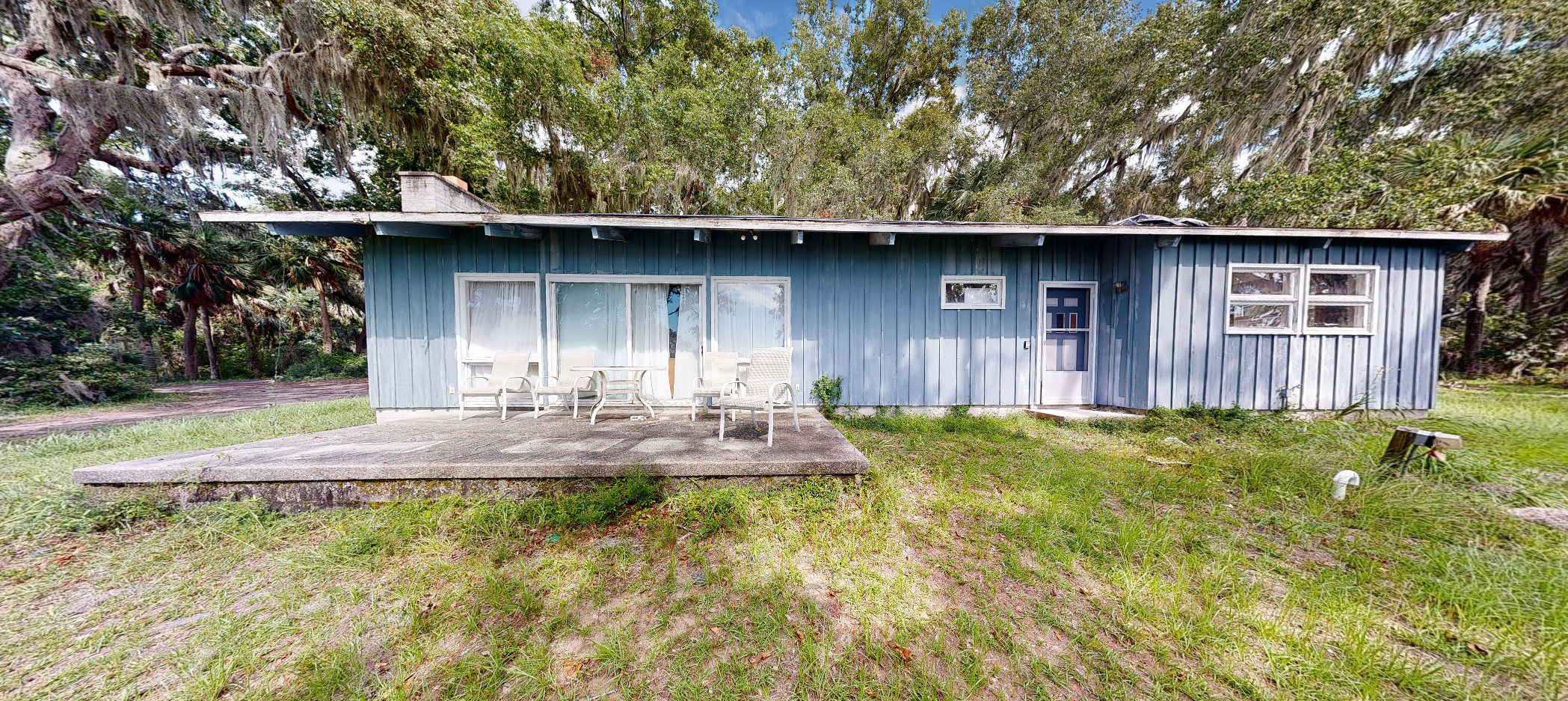
Retreat House Exterior

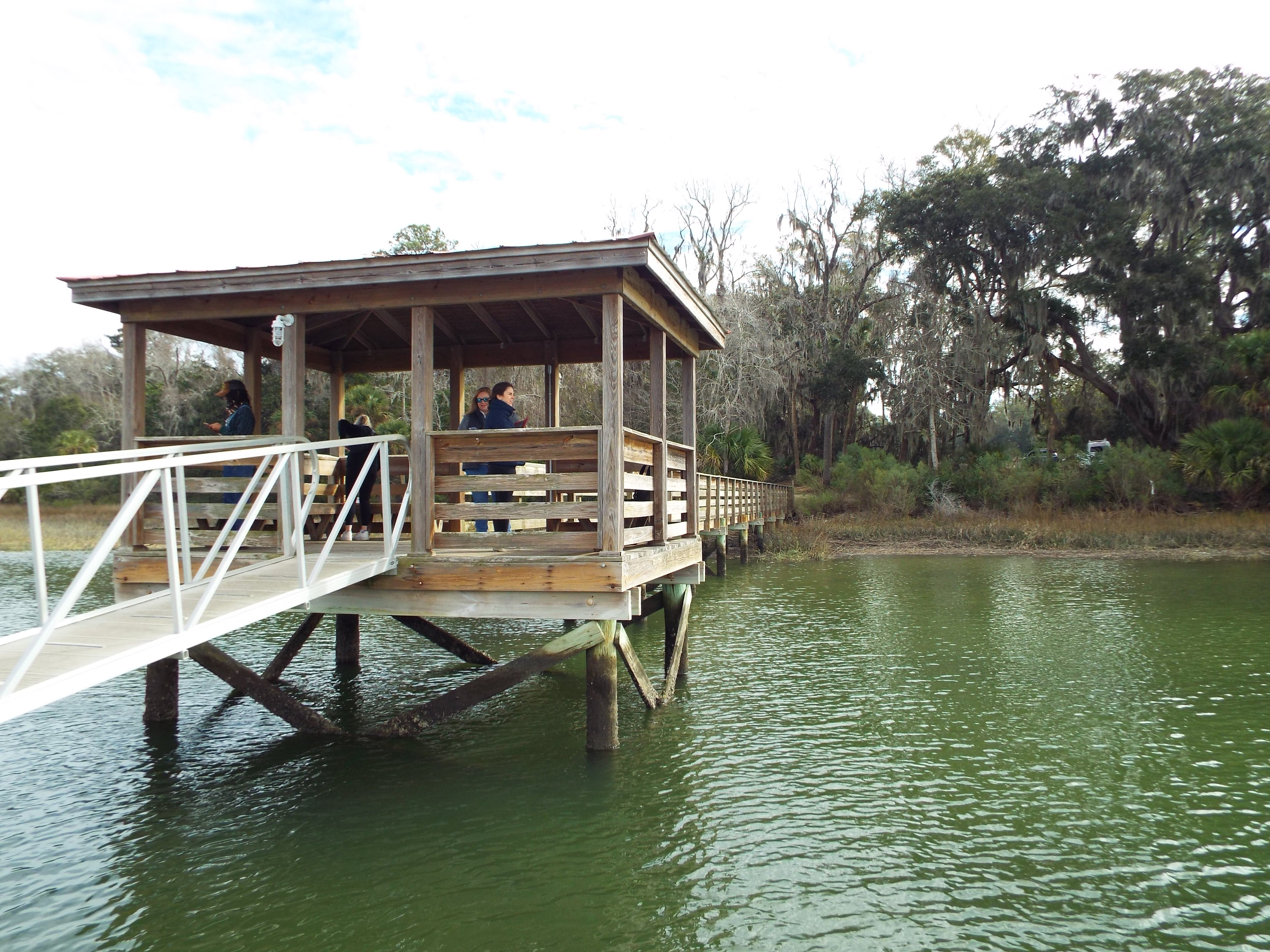
Retreat House Dock

== See also ==
- Reconstruction Era National Monument
- Gullah/Geechee Cultural Heritage Corridor
- List of National Historic Landmarks in South Carolina
- National Register of Historic Places listings in Beaufort County, South Carolina
