= Benezet House =

Historic dormitory at Penn Center

- U.S. Historic district – Contributing property
- U.S. National Historic Landmark District – Contributing property
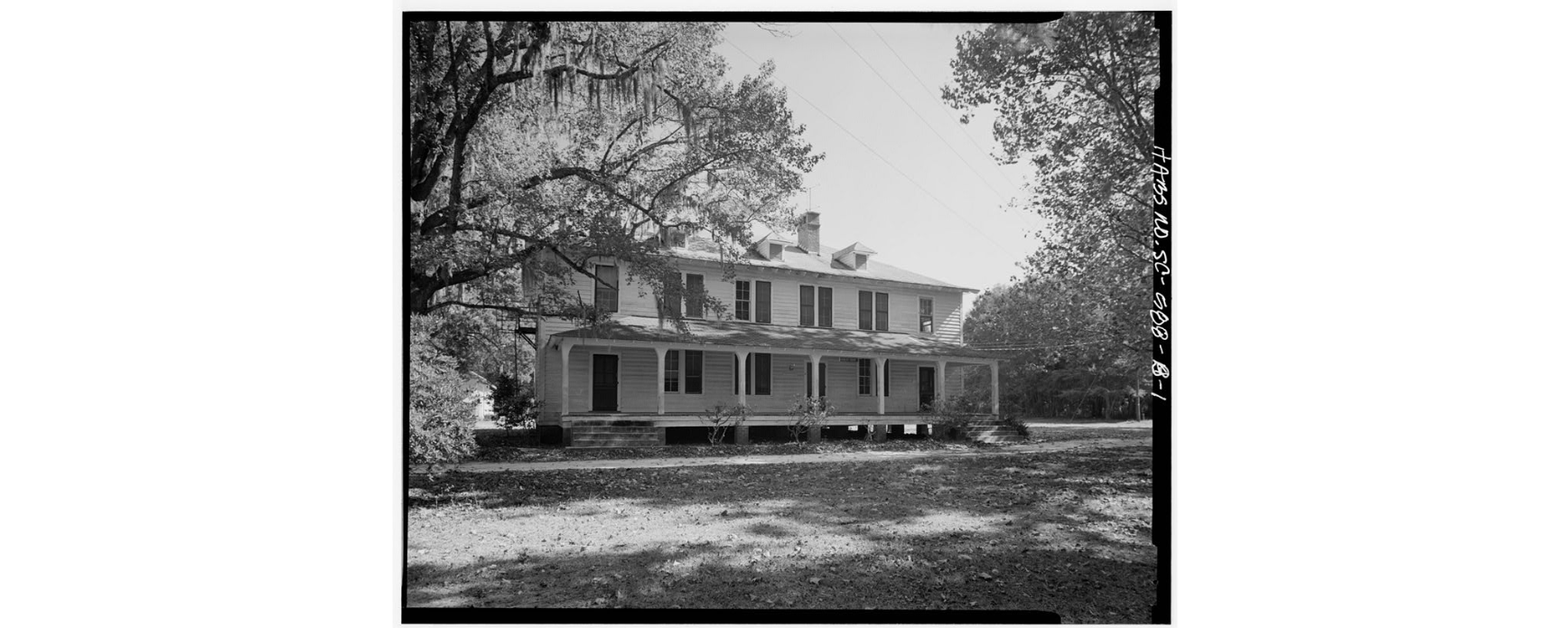
- Benezet House

- Location within South Carolina Location within the United States
- Nearest city: St. Helena Island, South Carolina
- Coordinates: 32.38830°N 80.57530°W
- Area: 47 acres (19 ha)
- Built: 1855
- Part of: Penn School Historic District (ID74001824)

Significant dates
- Designated CP: September 9, 1974
- Designated NHLDCP: December 2, 1974

Benezet House, also known as Benezette House, is an historic dormitory located on the campus of Penn Center. It was erected in 1905 and named after Frenchman, Anthony Benezet, who stood for freedom in the mid- and late-1870's. The female teachers and female boarding students of Penn School were housed here. The mandatory nightly chapel service held in the ground floor lobby was, however, open to both male and female students. This location was the focal point of home economics training for female students, each of whom were required to reside in Benezet before they graduated. Today, Benezet House is used to house overnight guests to Penn Center.

== Gallery ==
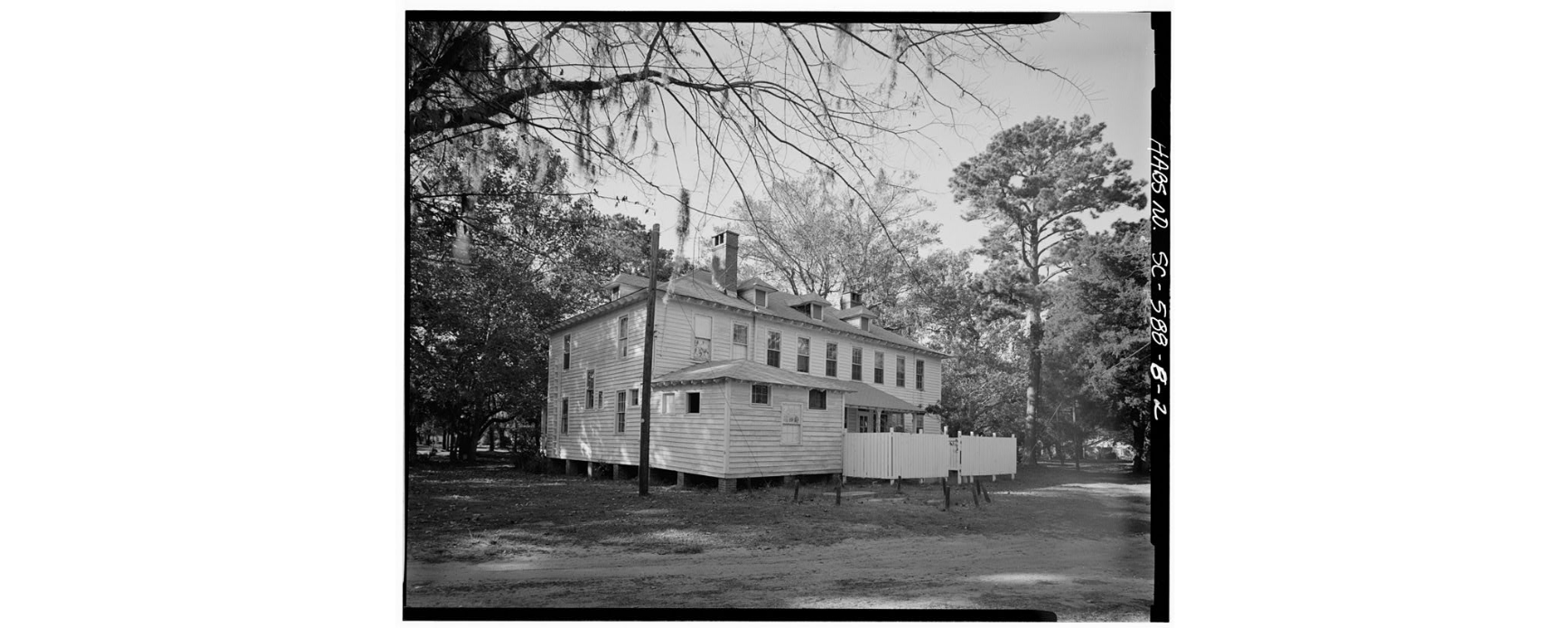
Back of Benezet House

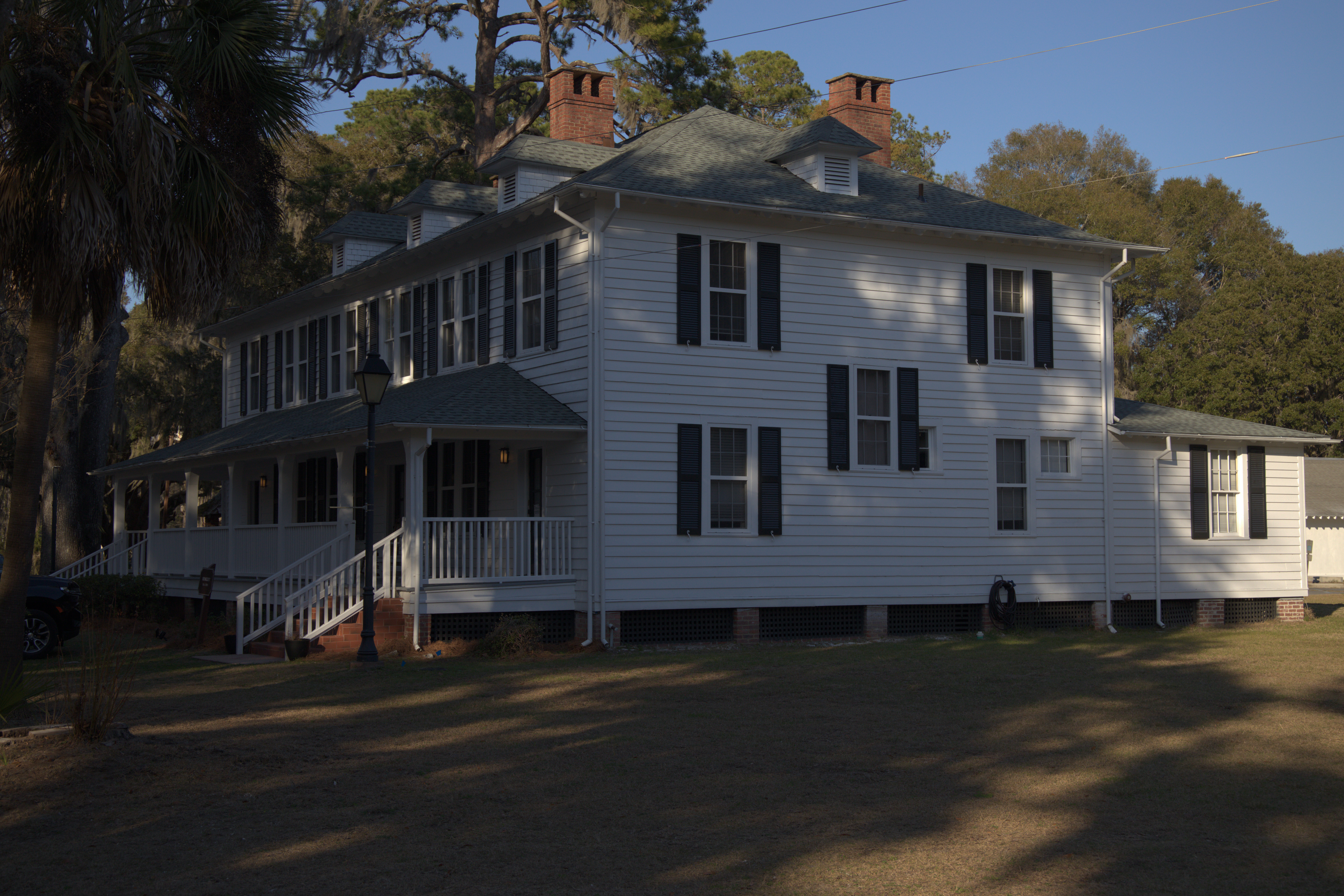
Benezet Dormitory Exterior

== See also ==
- Reconstruction Era National Monument
- Gullah/Geechee Cultural Heritage Corridor
- List of National Historic Landmarks in South Carolina
- National Register of Historic Places listings in Beaufort County, South Carolina
