= Gantt Cottage =

Historic dormitory in the Penn School Historic District

- U.S. Historic district – Contributing property
- U.S. National Historic Landmark District – Contributing property
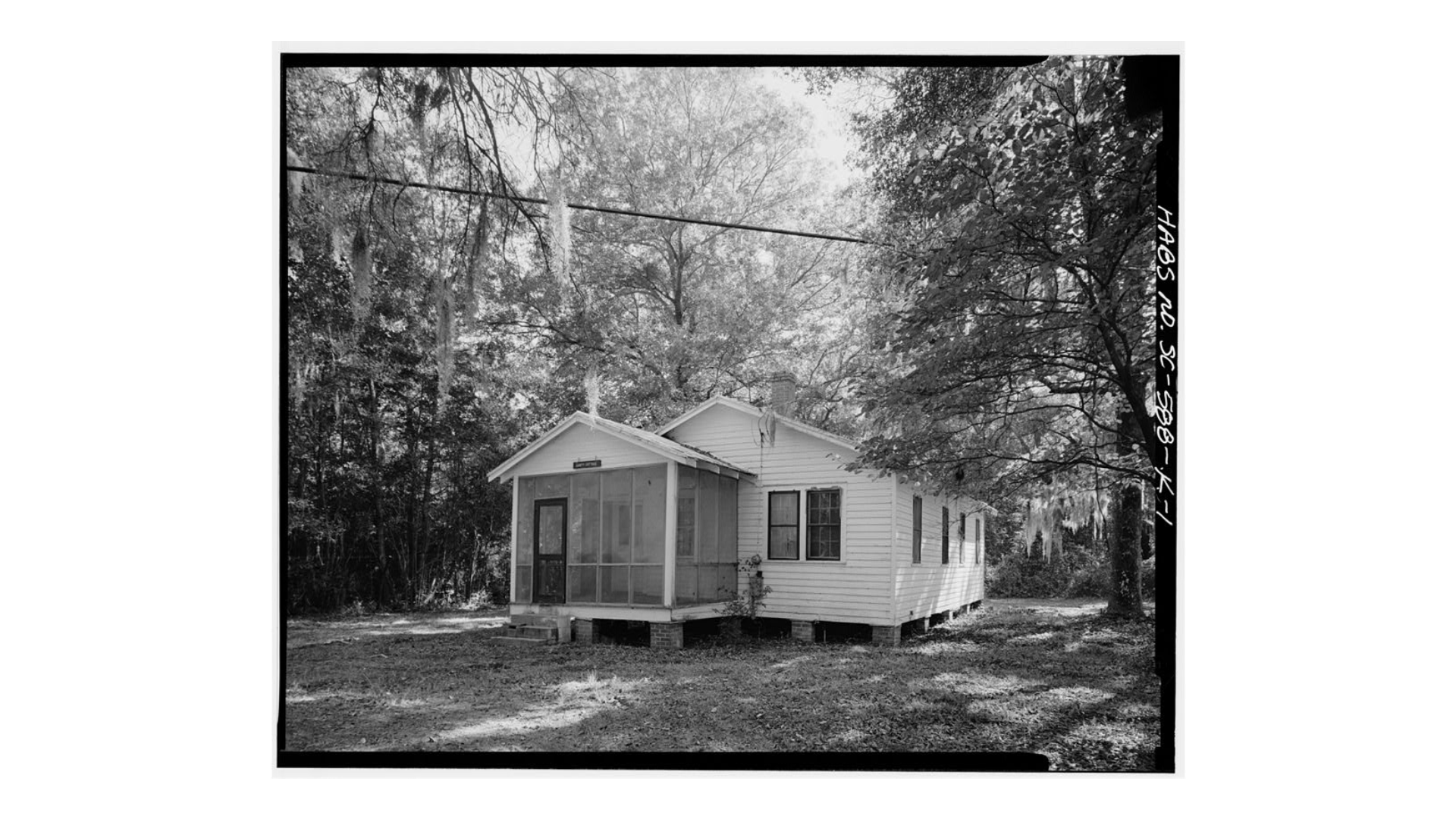
- Gantt Cottage

- Location within South Carolina Location within the United States
- Nearest city: St. Helena Island, South Carolina
- Coordinates: 32.38830°N 80.57530°W
- Area: 47 acres (19 ha)
- Built: 1855
- Part of: Penn School Historic District (ID74001824)

Significant dates
- Designated CP: September 9, 1974
- Designated NHLDCP: December 2, 1974

The original Gantt Cottage located on the campus of Penn School, now known as Penn Center, was named after the ex-enslaved Hastings Gantt, who donated the original tract of land for Penn School to Laura Towne. It was destroyed by fire around 1940. The current house, built by students, is a replacement. Mr. Gantt was a businessman and politician. He served in the South Carolina Legislature as a representative from Beaufort during the Reconstruction period. During the 1960s, Dr. Martin Luther King, Jr. stayed at Gantt. Penn Center was one of the few places in the south where bi-racial groups could meet. Planning for the great Civil Rights “March on Washington” took place here as well as the writing of the "I Have a Dream" speech.

== Gallery ==
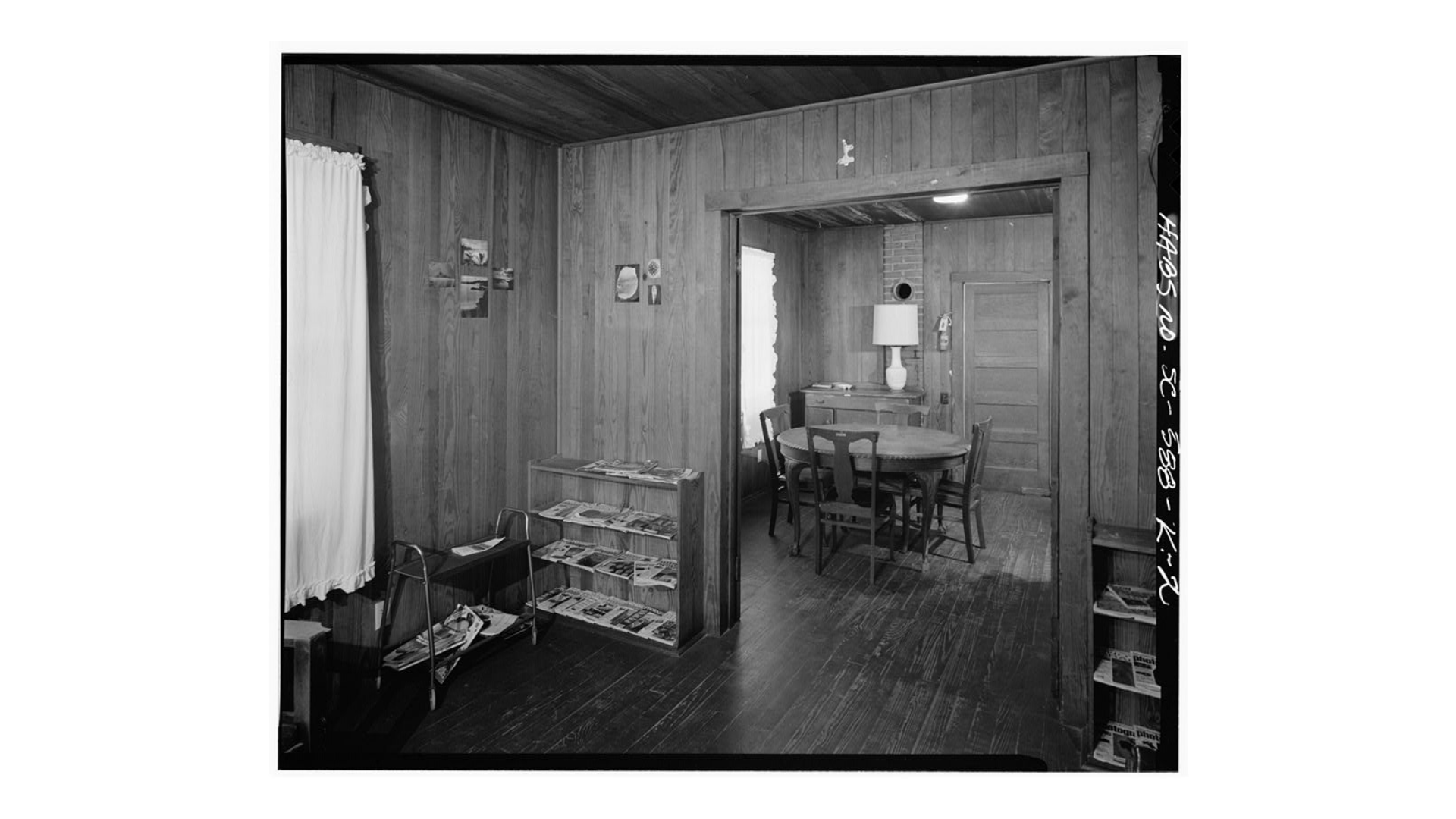
Looking from the Dining Room into the Living Room

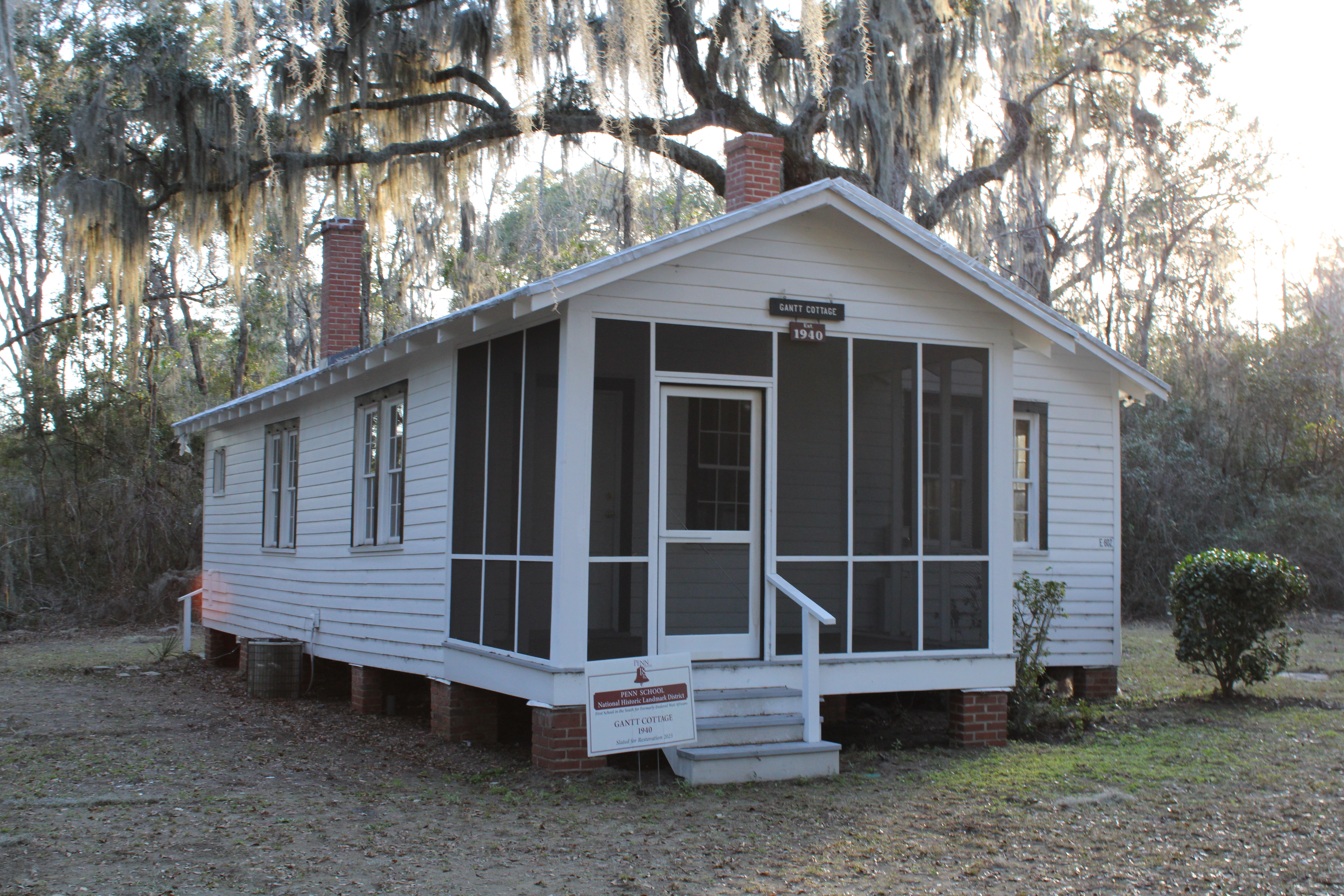
Gantt Cottage

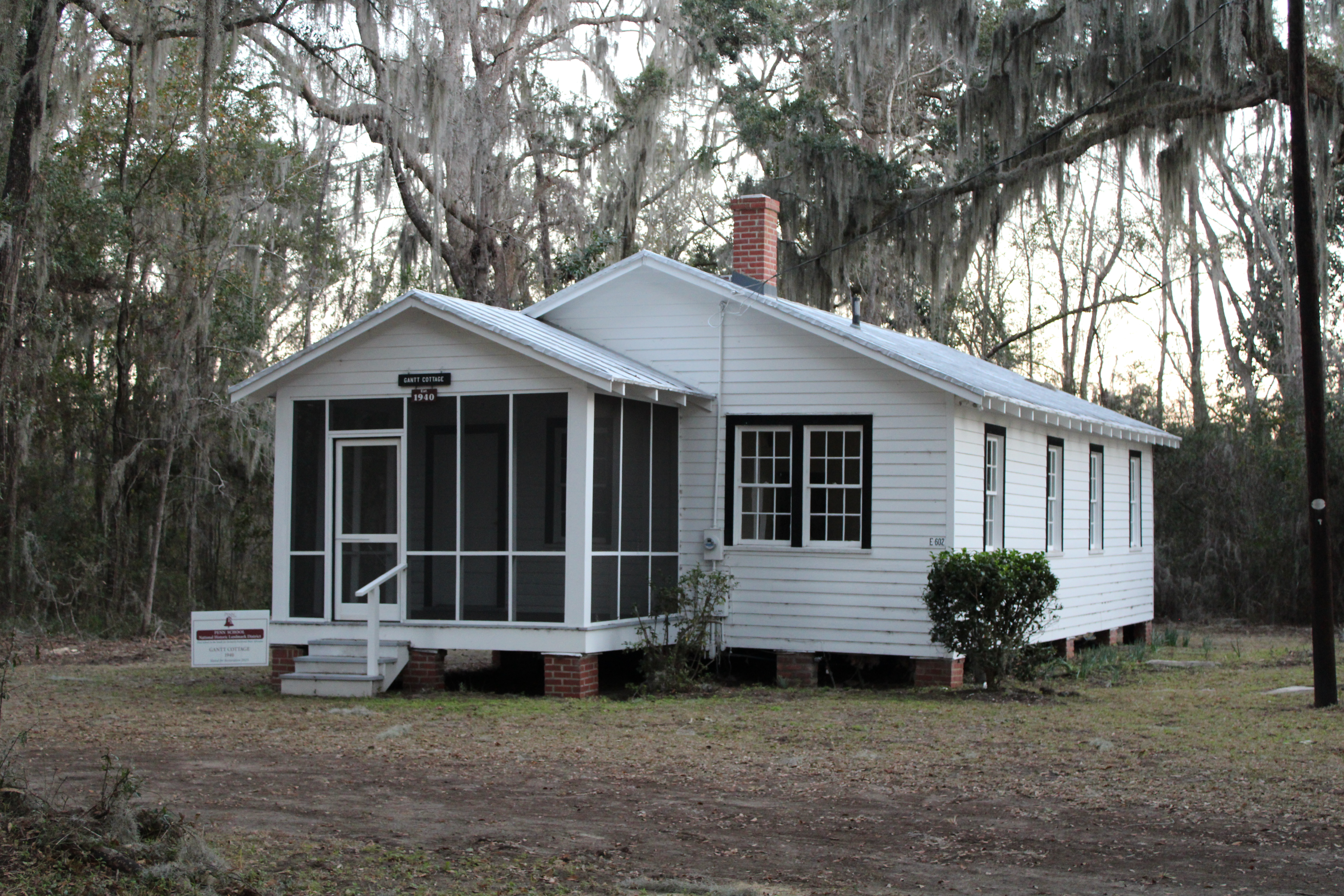
Gantt Cottage Exterior

== See also ==
- Reconstruction Era National Monument
- Gullah/Geechee Cultural Heritage Corridor
- List of National Historic Landmarks in South Carolina
- National Register of Historic Places listings in Beaufort County, South Carolina
