= McCaleb =

McCaleb is a surname. Notable people with the surname include:

- Chris McCaleb (born 1978), American film and television director, producer and editor
- Ella McCaleb (1856–1933), American college dean
- Ellen McCaleb, American woodworker and painter
- Gary D. McCaleb (born 1941), American academic, politician and writer
- Jed McCaleb, American computer programmer and entrepreneur
- Neal McCaleb (1935–2025), American civil engineer and politician
- Theodore Howard McCaleb (1810–1864), American judge

== See also ==
- McCalebb
- Mount McCaleb
