= Ellen Murray (abolitionist) =

American abolitionist (1834–1908)

Ellen Murray was an abolitionist, educator, and founder of the Penn School on St. Helena Island, South Carolina. Murray is remembered for dedicating her time to helping newly freed slaves gain an education and practice self-sufficiency.

== Early life ==
Ellen Murray was born in Saint John, New Brunswick, Canada, on January 13, 1834. Her father, John Thomas Murray, a well-known lawyer and clerk in Saint John, passed away two years after Ellen was born. After his passing, John left behind his fortune to Ellen and her sisters Frances, Elizabeth, and Harriet. Ellen and her sisters were able to obtain an education in Europe, where she became fluent in English, French, and German. She utilized her skills and became a teacher in Newport, Rhode Island, where her family had purchased a home and where her mother died in 1867.

== Occupation ==
Murray began her teaching career at the Oaks Plantation in Newport in 1862. Following this, she began her job at the Brick Church on St. Helena Island, where she taught children. This was where she met her lifelong friend and co-founder of Penn School, Laura M. Towne of Philadelphia. The two first met when Towne arrived in Rhode Island to meet with the Quakers about abolitionists. Laura first arrived in Beaufort, South Carolina in 1862 due to the capture of the Port Royal Sound area by Union Forces in 1861. Towne helped organize relief commissions for about 10,000 former slaves who were left behind. The Penn School was considered a historic freedmen's school, dedicated to teaching former slaves located on St. Helena Island. Murray taught a curriculum that consisted of "reading, spelling, writing, geography, grammar and arithmetic." She devoted some of her time to pursuing writing, as she published her first book in The National Anti-Slavery Standard. Her poem touches on the importance of freedom and equality, where she expresses America's need for the abolition of slavery. Murray highlighted the urgency for moral conviction regarding slavery. In 1865, the Pennsylvania Freedman's Relief Commission sent a building to St. Helena's Island. Murray and Towne became co-founders of the new Penn School after moving their classes there and renaming it. This became St. Helena's first African American school, serving as a school, health agency, and society for African Americans.

== Late life and death ==
The Penn School experienced various financial problems in the late 1800s, and the families of both Ellen and Laura had donated funds to their school. For a short period of time, the two were not able to pay salaries to the teachers in order to keep the school financially stable. Both Ellen and Laura continued to teach up until their last days. Their curriculum stayed firmly in place, allowing the students to learn how to read, write, gain land rights, and obtain medical care. Murray's partner, Laura M. Towne, died in 1901, leaving her in partnership with Towne's second appointed partner, Hollis Burke Frissell. Murray became the principal of the school and continued to refrain from using the new industrial curriculum that Frissell insisted on using. Murray was dedicated to her work and worked up until the day before her death on January 14, 1908. Ellen Murray's memorial service was held on the campus of Penn School three days later, where her students paid their respects. Her burial took place on St. Helena Island, her gravestone marked "Founder, Principal, Teacher." She was remembered as a committed abolitionist and educator who dedicated her time to helping the uneducated.

== List of works ==
Poems

"The Martyr of December 2, 1859" (October 26, 1861)

"Deus Eversor!" (November 16, 1861)

"Our Watchword" (May 10, 1862)

"Tamar's Prayer" (August 2, 1862)

"Half-Way" (October 4, 1862)

"The First Day of January, 1863" (December 27, 1862)

"God with Us" (April 18, 1863)

"Sunset on Edisto Beach" (July 11, 1863)

"Moonlight on Edisto Beach" (July 18, 1863)

"Col. Robert G. Shaw" (August 22, 1863)

"The Workingman" (January 30, 1864)

"The Freed Land" (August 13, 1864)

"Olustee" (December 17, 1864)

"Going Home to Edisto" (March 18, 1865)
