= Rossa Belle Cooley =

American educator (1872–1949)

- Born: October 3, 1872; Albany, New York, U.S.
- Died: September 24, 1949 (aged 76); Greenport, New York, U.S.
- Occupation: Educator
- Known for: Principal, Penn School (1904-1944)

Rossa Belle Cooley (October 3, 1872 – September 14, 1949) was an American educator. She taught at Hampton Institute and was the second principal of the Penn School on Saint Helena Island, South Carolina from 1904 to 1944.

== Early life and education ==
Cooley was born in Albany, New York, the daughter of LeRoy Clark Cooley and Rosa Bella Flack Cooley. Her father was a chemistry professor at Vassar College. She graduated from Vassar in 1893.

== Career ==
Cooley taught at Hampton Institute as a young woman. She taught at the Penn School on Saint Helena Island beginning in 1901, and became the school's principal in 1908, succeeding Laura Matilda Towne. Grace Bigelow House was her vice-principal. She reorganized the school's curriculum along the lines of Hampton Institute's, to emphasize practical skills including carpentry and nursing. She explained, "Our object was to bring island life into the classroom—into the little world of teaching too bound up in the printed word."

Much of her work involved promotion and fundraising. She wrote two books about the school, and several articles. She visited Poughkeepsie often in this work. Her sister Mabel organized a Penn School Club at Vassar, to collect donations from the student body for Cooley's work. Ella McCaleb was president of the Penn School Club at Vassar in 1932.

Cooley was retired from her position in 1944, by the school's trustees. The school closed in 1948.

== Publications ==
- America's Sea Islands (1919)
- Homes of the Freed (1926)
- School Acres: An Adventure in Rural Education (1930)
- "A Day's Work at Penn's School" (1933)
- Education in the Soil (1940)

== Personal life and legacy ==
Cooley lived with her sister in retirement. She died in September 1949, at the age of 76, in Greenport, New York. The Rossa Cooley Health Center was dedicated at the Penn Community Center in 1958. Many of Cooley's papers and photographs are in the Penn School Papers at the Southern Historical Collection, University of North Carolina, Chapel Hill.
