= 1st South Carolina Colored Infantry Regiment =

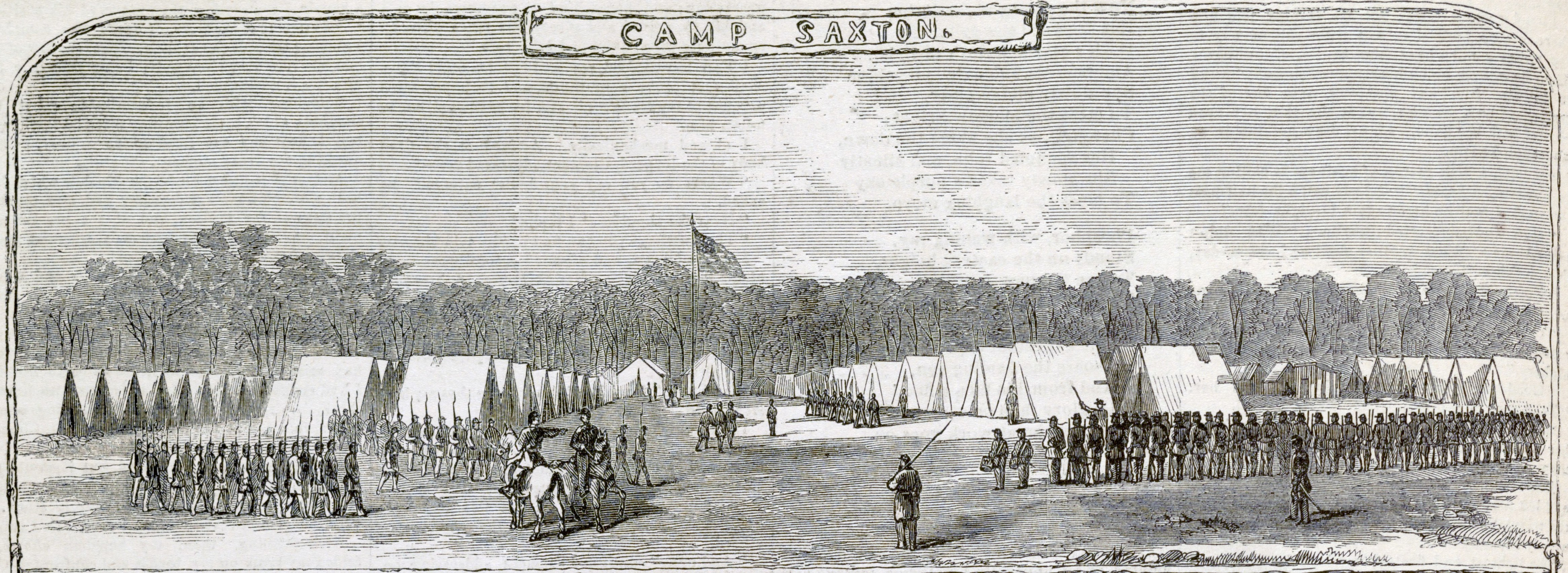
- “We, their officers, did not go there to teach lessons, but to receive them. There were more than a hundred men in the ranks who had voluntarily met more dangers in their escape from slavery than any of my young captains had incurred in all their lives.” — Col. Thomas Wentworth Higginson
- Active: May 1862 to February 9, 1866
- Country: United States
- Allegiance: United States of America; Union
- Branch: Infantry
- Equipment: Rifled muskets

Commanders
- Notable commanders: Col. Thomas Wentworth Higginson

The 1st South Carolina Colored Infantry Regiment was a Union Army regiment during the American Civil War, formed by General Rufus Saxton. It was composed of Gullah Geechee recruits and escaped slaves from South Carolina, Georgia, and Florida. The 1st SC Volunteer Infantry black regiment was formed in 1862 and became the 33rd United States Colored Troops Regiment in February 1864. It has the distinction of being the first black regiment to fight in the Civil War at the Skirmish at Spaulding's on the Sapelo River GA. It was one of the first black regiments in the Union Army. (Note: The 54th Massachusetts Volunteer Infantry, whose exploits are memorialized in the film Glory, was formed afterwards and drew from free Northern blacks.)

== History ==
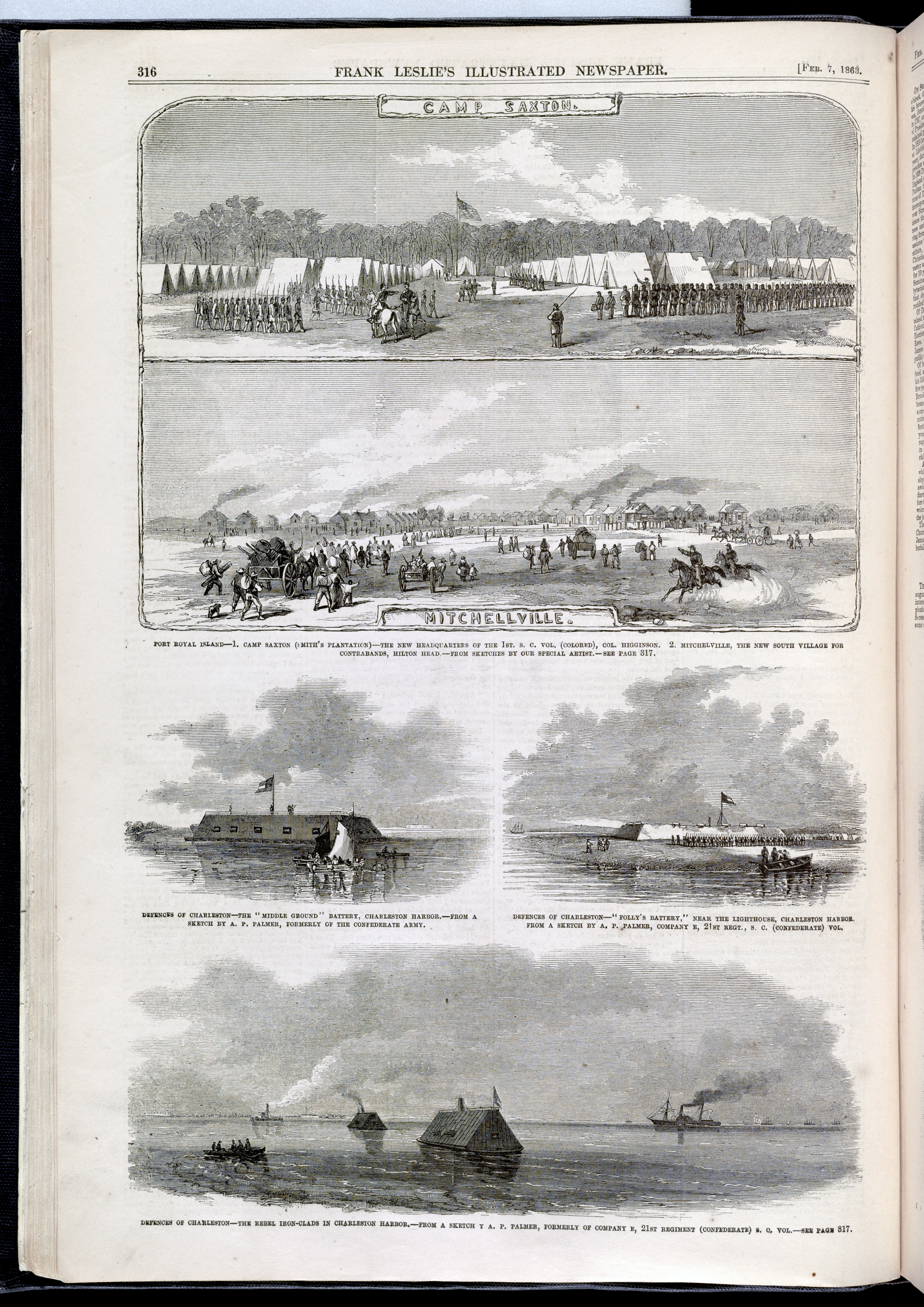
Port Royal Island - 1. Camp Saxton (Smith's plantation)

Most of the slaves in the South Carolina Sea Islands became free after the Battle of Port Royal on November 7, 1861 when many of the white residents and plantation owners fled the area after the arrival of the Union Navy and Army. The 1st South Carolina Volunteer Infantry (Colored) Regiment was organized on Hilton Head Island, South Carolina in May 1862 by General David Hunter who was in charge of the Department of the South. Most of the men in the unit were former Gullah slaves from the South Carolina Sea Islands who spoke Gullah, a Sea Island Creole. This first unit formed under Hunter were called "Hunter's Regiment." Union soldiers were tasked with recruiting Black soldiers, one well-known recruiter was a white New Yorker named Sergeant Charles Trowbridge. Trowbridge looked for people who wanted to join because other Black men were forced to join the Union Army. The first two recruits were William Bronson and Prince Rivers. Trowbridge recruited 50 to 100 men; they were trained and armed and engaged in guerrilla warfare to liberate enslaved people. In August 1862, a company in the regiment went to St. Simons Island, Georgia to liberate the enslaved communities; however previously, African Americans there self-emancipated themselves and had driven their enslavers off. Some of the Geechee people in St. Simons Island joined the 1st South Carolina Volunteer Infantry including Susie King Taylor.

On St. Helena Island, South Carolina other units of the 1st South Carolina were disbanded in August 1862 (except for Trowbridge’s company on St. Simons) under orders from President Abraham Lincoln's administration because Hunter was not authorized by the U.S. War Department to recruit contraband (free Blacks) into the army, and the recruits were involuntarily forced into the regiment "in a manner reminiscent of their days as slaves". Although Hunter disbanded the regiment under orders from the U.S. War Department, Hunter kept 100 soldiers sending the rest home. The company of 100 Gullah soldiers were placed on guard duty at St. Simon's Island. This company of 100 Black soldiers in the 1st South Carolina remained, and the regiment was later reorganized at Camp Saxton (previously called the Smith Plantation) near Beaufort under General Rufus Saxton on August 22, 1862 when U.S. Secretary of War Edwin M. Stanton authorized Saxton to "arm, equip, and receive into the service of the United States such volunteers of African descent as you may deem expedient, not exceeding 5,000".

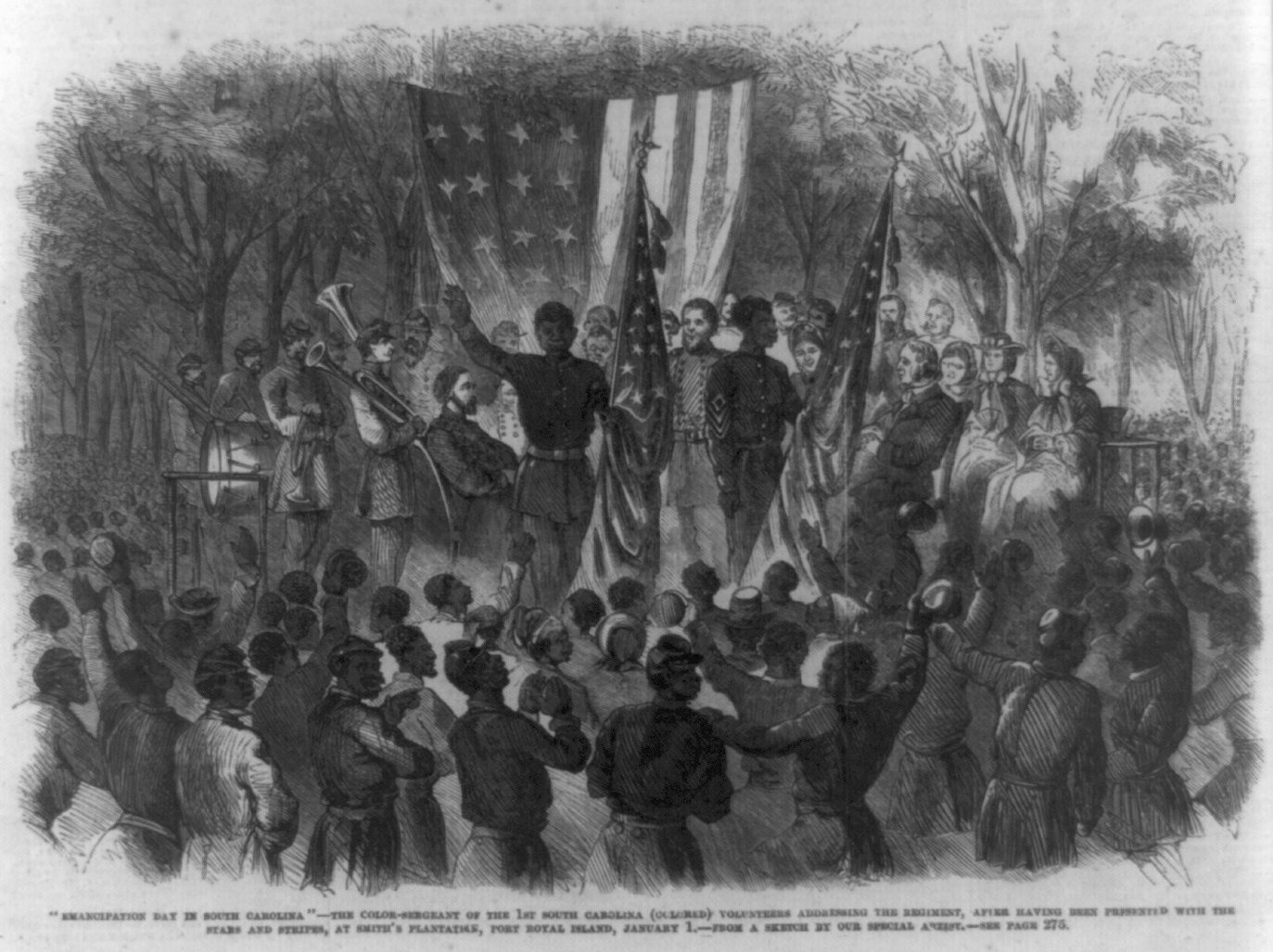
"Emancipation Day in South Carolina" - Soldiers Prince Rivers and Corporal Robert Sutton of the 1st South Carolina (Colored) are presented with the Stars and Stripes at the former John Joyner Smith plantation renamed Camp Saxton

This unit was formed under the second Confiscation Act of 1862. The 1862 Confiscation Act stated properties including slaves belonging to disloyal citizens (supporters of the Confederacy) in the South belonged to the Union (United States). The Union Army were permitted the right to "employ" contraband of war (free Blacks) for use against the Confederacy and recruited formerly enslaved people into the Union Army to fight in the war. In October 1862 Company A of the First South Carolina Volunteer Infantry Regiment was organized with other companies organized soon after. On November 10, 1862 Colonel Thomas Wentworth Higginson assumed command, and by January 31, 1863 the 1st South Carolina was mustered into military service. Gullah soldiers of the 1st South Carolina were trained at Camp Saxton, named after General Rufus Saxton, located in present day Port Royal, South Carolina and occupied the camp from November 1862 to January 1863.

As early as November 3, 1862, sixty-two members from Company A of the regiment under the command of Lt. Colonel Oliver T. Beard conducted raids on saltworks in northeast Florida. During their military operations in Florida, the 1st South Carolina liberated enslaved people and recruited them into the Union Army. The 1st South Carolina Volunteer Infantry regiment did an expedition up the St. Mary's River along the Georgia-Florida state line which lasted from January 23 to February 1, 1863. The regiment captured and occupied Jacksonville, Florida on March 10, 1863 and did other skirmishes along the coasts of South Carolina, Georgia, and Florida. They were particularly effective at conducting raids along the coast of Florida and Georgia, due to the men’s familiarity with the terrain. On July 9–11, 1863 the 1st South Carolina completed an expedition along the Edisto River where they helped to liberate enslaved people in the area fleeing to Union boats. From February 1864 to the end of the Civil War, the 33rd USCT (1st South Carolina Volunteer Infantry) did war operations between the coasts of Charleston, South Carolina and Jacksonville, Florida and were mustered out of service on February 6, 1866 at Fort Wagner on Morris Island.

=== Legacy and influence ===
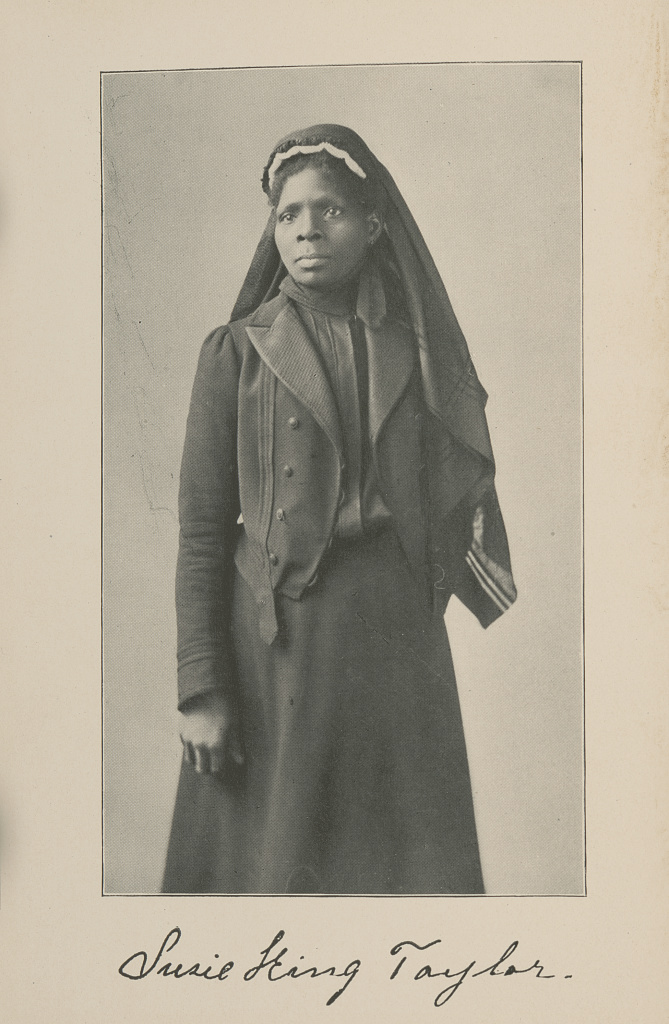
Susie King Taylor, known as the first African American Army nurse

The regiment was a step in the evolution of Union thinking towards the escaped slaves who crossed their lines. Initially they were returned to their owners. Next they were considered contraband and employed as laborers. Finally the legal fiction that they were property was abandoned and they were allowed to enlist in the Army, although in segregated units commanded by white officers. As a holdover from the "contraband" days, black privates were paid $10 per month, the rate for laborers, rather than the $13 paid to white privates. The men served as the precedent for the over 170,000 "colored" troops who followed them into the Union Army. Harriet Tubman served with these men as a nurse in Hunter's regiment.

Susie King Taylor was born enslaved in Liberty County, Georgia and escaped from slavery in the summer of 1862 during the Civil War and fled to St. Simon's Island, Georgia where there was a Union encampment, and encountered Company A of the 1st South Carolina Infantry. Taylor followed the 1st South Carolina back to Camp Saxton in Port Royal in October 1862. She served as a laundress and nurse for the men and married Edward King who was a sergeant in the 1st South Carolina. During Taylor's time with the regiment she taught men in Company E how to read from spelling books. Susie K. Taylor learned how to read when she was enslaved in Georgia in a secret school operated by two free Black women. Taylor remained with the regiment from August 1862 until they mustered out of service on February 9, 1866 at Fort Wagner located on Morris Island, South Carolina. After her service, Taylor returned to Savannah, Georgia with her husband and opened a school for Black American children. She dedicated her life with the Woman’s Relief Corps, a national organization for female Civil War veterans.

Black military service during the Civil war may have been the catalyst to grant citizenship to African Americans and women under the 14th amendment, as both groups served in the war as soldiers or nurses. Frederick Douglass who was a 19th century civil rights activist believed Black Americans deserved citizenship because of their military service in the Union Army. He said: "Once let the black man get upon his person the brass letter, U.S., let him get an eagle on his button, and a musket on his shoulder and bullets in his pocket, there is no power on earth that can deny that he has earned the right to citizenship".

The National Park Service has a list of soldiers that served in the 1st South Carolina Volunteer Infantry (Colored) Regiment. The Reconstruction Era National Historical Park provides a brief summary of notable people in the 1st South Carolina Volunteers.

=== Officers ===
The regiment’s first commander was Col. Thomas Wentworth Higginson, a minister, author and abolitionist. He wrote of his men, “We, their officers, did not go there to teach lessons, but to receive them. There were more than a hundred men in the ranks who had voluntarily met more dangers in their escape from slavery than any of my young captains had incurred in all their lives.”

During the war Higginson documented the Gullah dialect spoken by some of the men and made a record of the spirituals that they sang. Higginson later wrote a book about his experiences titled Army Life in a Black Regiment. In 1867, Higginson published the first collection of African American spirituals in the Atlantic Monthly. During the Civil war, Higginson, northern teachers, and Union soldiers in the South Carolina sea islands heard Gullah spirituals for the first time and Higginson brought Gullah spirituals to national attention in his publication. Higginson explained the lyrics were religious and about triumph.

Major Seth Rogers was regimental surgeon and wrote extensive wartime letters. His nephew, Captain James Seth Rogers, previously of the 51st Massachusetts, was captain of Company B.

=== Notable people ===
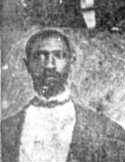
Prince Rivers

Some of the soldiers who served in the 1st SC volunteers became historical figures in the Black community. Prince Rivers was born enslaved in a coastal town in Beaufort, South Carolina and escaped from slavery when the Sea Islands of South Carolina was occupied by the Union Navy and Army. With his freedom he joined the 1st South Carolina Volunteers Colored Infantry and became the sergeant and held the position of provost of the guard. Rivers was also present at the Emancipation Day celebration at Camp Saxton and received the colors of the First South Carolina Volunteers. After the war, Rivers served as a delegate to the 1868 South Carolina Constitutional Convention, represented Edgefield County in the state House of Representatives, and served as a representative in the House of Aiken County in 1874.

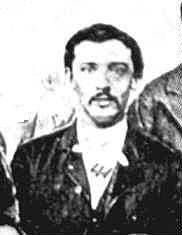
Henry E. Hayne

Henry E. Hayne was born free on December 30, 1840, in Charleston, South Carolina to a white man, James Hayne, and a free Black woman named Mary. In Charleston, Henry Hayne received an education and worked as a tailor. "When the Civil War broke out, local tradition holds that he was white passing enough to join the Confederate army, with the sole purpose of trying to get close enough to Union lines where he could escape." Hayne later joined the 1st South Carolina Volunteer Infantry Regiment (later called the 33rd United States Colored Troops) in mid 1863. In 1866 he was discharged and moved to Marion County, South Carolina. Hayne was hired by the Freedmen's Bureau to be the principal of Madison Colored School. In 1867, Hayne served on the Republican state executive committee and represented Marion County in the 1868 state constitutional convention. During Reconstruction, he became active in the Republican Party, which had supported citizenship and suffrage for free Black Americans. In 1868 to 1872, he represented Marion County in the state Senate and from 1872 to 1877 was South Carolina’s secretary of state. Hayne became the first Black student at the University of South Carolina, enrolling in their medical school, but he left before receiving his degree. He desegrated the University of South Carolina.

Another notable historic person who served with the 1st South Carolina Infantry was Corporal Robert Sutton. Robert Sutton was born enslaved on the Alberti Plantation along Florida’s northeastern boundary near Georgia. During his years enslaved, he sailed up and down the Saint Mary’s River transporting lumber and his enslavers. Sutton escaped from slavery on a canoe he built sailing upriver that emptied out into the Atlantic Ocean. He eventually reached Camp Saxton and enlisted into the 1st South Carolina Volunteer Black regiment. On January 1, 1863 there was an Emancipation Day celebration at Camp Saxton and Corporal Sutton was presented the flag.

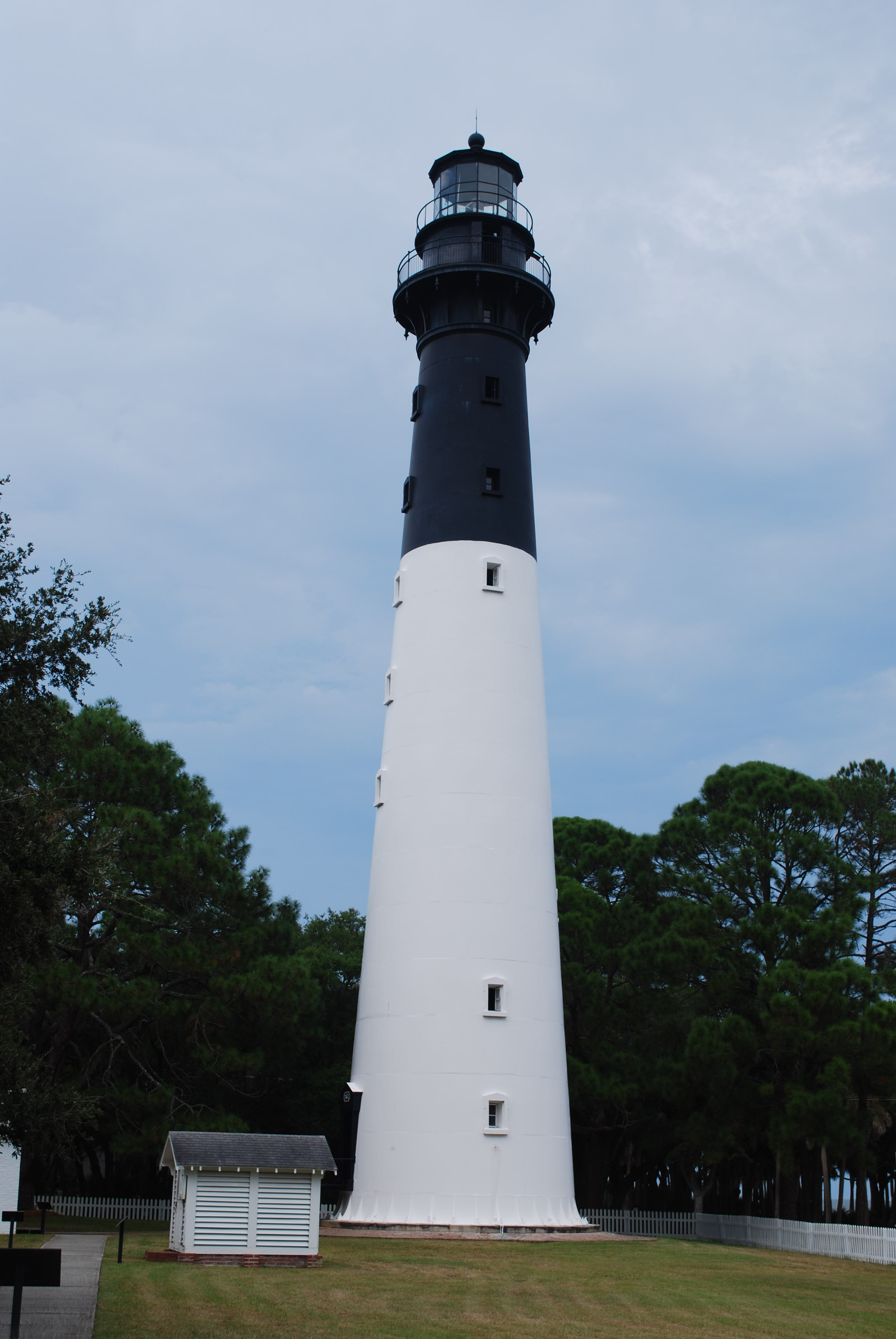
Louden Langley worked as an Assistant Lighthouse Keeper at Hunting Island Lighthouse.

Many of the 1st South Carolina Volunteer Infantry were from South Carolina, Georgia, and Florida's Gullah Geechee communities; however, Louden Langley a free Black man from Vermont joined the regiment. Louden Langley was born free in Huntington, Vermont in the late 1830s. When he was a teenager, his family helped freedom seekers (runaway slaves) escape from slavery on the Underground Railroad by hiding them in their home. In 1854, Langley wrote in a newspaper enslaved people had the right to rebel against slavery through war. During the Civil War in 1863, Langley joined the United States Army and hoped to join the 1st South Carolina Volunteer Infantry but was assigned to the 54th Massachusetts Infantry due to a recruiting error. By 1864 the recruiting was corrected, and he was transferred to the 33rd United States Colored Troops (1st South Carolina Volunteers). He served in the regiment as the Sergeant Major until he was mustered out in 1866. After his military service, he stayed in Beaufort County, South Carolina. Langley became involved in politics during Reconstruction and represented the District of Beaufort during the 1868 South Carolina Constitutional Convention in Charleston and advocated for free and equal education in the state of South Carolina. After the convention, he served as the School Commissioner of Beaufort County. South Carolina had a majority Black legislature, and many local politicians were Black American; however, white legislatures and violent factions removed many Black office holders including Langley. This ended Langley's political career. He moved his family to St. Helena Island and worked as an Assistant Lighthouse Keeper at the Hunting Island lighthouse located in present day Hunting Island State Park. Langley died at age 43 and is buried at the Beaufort National Cemetery.

== Redesignation ==
The regiment was re-designated the 33rd United States Colored Infantry Regiment on February 8, 1864.

== See also ==
- 1st Kansas Colored Infantry Regiment
- 1st Louisiana Native Guard (United States)
- Liberty Billings, second in command of the regiment
- List of Union South Carolina Civil War Units

== Other sources ==
- Stephen V. Ash, Firebrand of Liberty: The Story of Two Black Regiments That Changed the Course of the Civil War (W. W. Norton & Company 2008).
- Higginson, Thomas Wentworth, Army Life in a Black Regiment, 1869.
