= McCalebb =

McCalebb is a surname. Notable people with the surname include:

- Bo McCalebb (born 1985), American-Macedonian basketball player
- Howard McCalebb (born 1947), American sculptor
- Onterio McCalebb (born 1989), American footballer

== See also ==
- McCaleb
