= Penn Center (Saint Helena Island, South Carolina) =

- Penn School Historic District
- U.S. National Register of Historic Places
- U.S. National Historic Landmark District
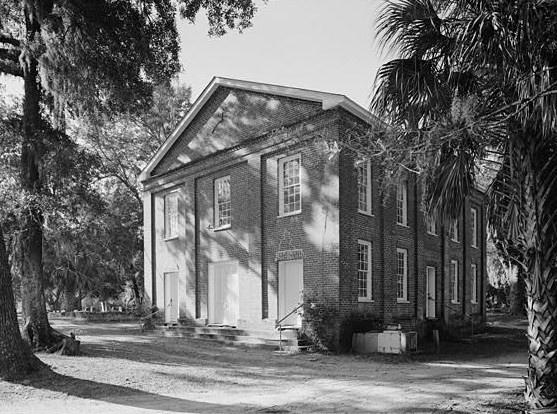
- Brick Baptist Church

- Location within South Carolina Location within the United States
- Nearest city: St. Helena Island, South Carolina
- Coordinates: 32.38830°N 80.57530°W
- Area: 47 acres (19 ha)
- Built: 1855
- NRHP reference No.: 74001824

Significant dates
- Added to NRHP: September 9, 1974
- Designated NHLD: December 2, 1974

The Penn Center, formerly the Penn School, is an African-American cultural and educational center in the Corners Community on Saint Helena Island. Founded in 1862 by Quaker and Unitarian missionaries from Pennsylvania, it was the first school founded in the Southern United States specifically for the education of African-Americans. It provided critical educational facilities to Gullah slaves freed after plantation owners fled the island, and continues to fulfill an educational mission.

The campus was designated a National Historic Landmark District in 1974. Darrah Hall and the Brick Baptist Church on the campus were declared part of Reconstruction Era National Monument in January 2017. In 2019, it became the Reconstruction Era National Historic Park, along with Fort Sumter.

== Location ==
The Penn Center is located about one mile south of Frogmore on Dr. Martin Luther King Jr. Boulevard. The 47-acre (19 ha) campus is divided by the road, and includes a number of historic buildings related to the original function as a school, including classrooms, living spaces for students, teachers, and administrators. The oldest building on the campus is the 1855 Brick Church, built by the plantation owners of the island. St. Helena is one member of the ‘sea islands,’ which is an island chain that comprises around 100 islands off of the southeastern United States. The isolated nature of St. Helena Island contributed to the development of the unique Gullah/Geechee culture, which is being preserved through establishments like the Penn Center.

== History ==
=== American Civil War and Reconstruction Era ===
In 1861, after the first shots of the American Civil War at Fort Sumter, Union Army forces captured St. Helena Island, prompting the local plantation owners to flee. Union General Thomas W. Sherman directed the beginning of what would become known as the Port Royal Experiment, the goal of which was to establish hospitals and schools for former slaves through which to pursue education and careers, which could enable them to buy land in the Lowcountry around Port Royal, South Carolina. The military administration of the island partitioned the old plantations, giving the land to the former slaves who lived there. The confiscation of land by the government for sale also enabled white northerners to take advantage of the situation and buy thousands of acres of land throughout the sea islands.

The Penn School was established in 1862 by Laura Matilda Towne as a school for former slaves on St. Helena Island and the surrounding areas. Towne was born and raised in Salem, Massachusetts, but later moved to Philadelphia, Pennsylvania, where she was introduced to the abolitionist movement. Towne named Penn School in honor of William Penn, a Quaker champion for human liberty and the founder of Pennsylvania. For many years the work was financed by Philadelphia Quaker abolitionists. Ellen Murray, a Quaker teacher, joined Towne at the Penn School in late 1862. Charlotte Forten, born into a wealthy free black family in Philadelphia, joined Towne and Murray as the school's first black teacher, though she left in 1864. The Brick Church was used as an early meeting, educational, and administrative space. In 1864, the school's first dedicated educational building was constructed from prefabricated parts shipped from Pennsylvania, which were donated by the Philadelphia Freedmen's Association. A black resident of St. Helena donated the tract of land where the new schoolhouse was to be built.

=== Late 19th century ===
Once Penn School was established, and the American Civil War came to an end, Laura Towne and Ellen Murray began enacting their long-term plans. The pair considered education to be the foundation of advancement for former slaves, and began to implement a traditional northern curriculum in the classroom. This curriculum emphasized the importance of English over the Gullah dialect as well as teaching arithmetic and science. Books such as The Second Reader of the School and Family Series by Marcius Willson and The Common School Speller by William Fowle were used daily at the school. The school became renowned throughout the community and attracted students from other Lowcountry Sea Islands, as far away as Edisto (around 50-75 miles depending on the type of transportation,) who wanted to receive an education.

When northern support for Penn's mission began to wane in the 1870s, Towne used her business skills to mitigate challenges, the biggest one being the school's finances and funding. During times of greater financial stress in the 1870s, Towne and Murray both declined a salary from the school, however, they continued to receive financial support from their families who remained affluent in the northern United States. Financial assets were left to Towne after her brother Henry's death in 1875. Towne and Murray valued continuing the cycle of education, which led them to start a teacher training program. The first round of teacher training began in 1868 and concluded in 1870. The first cycle of training produced several teachers who went on to be hired by South Carolina as public school educators.

=== Early 20th century ===
In the last decade of the 19th century, Penn School was reorganized to include a board of trustees who were primarily wealthy northerners. When Towne died in February 1901, Murray took over many of her administrative roles until her death in 1908. Hollis Burke Frissell, a trustee on the board, led the search for Towne's replacement while Murray filled in during the interim. Eventually, Rossa Belle Cooley (1872–1949) was chosen to be Towne's successor. Grace Bigelow House (1877–1965) became the Vice Principal of Penn School in 1904. Cooley and House agreed with the school curriculum's emphasis on English, but they also decided to focus more on the needs of the community instead of implementing a strict northern education. Additionally, the pair implemented a year-long academic schedule. Several students of the school took high-school level classes and graduated, some pursuing further education. In 1948, the school was transferred to the authority of the state of South Carolina. Three years later in 1951, the institution became the Penn Center. The institution then became the Penn Center, with directors including Howard Kester, Courtney Siceloff, John Gadson, Joe McDomick and Emory Campbell, and continued an educational mission for the island's citizens. The center's directors were also responsible for maintaining a museum, cultural center, and conference meeting space.

=== Civil Rights Movement and the late 20th century ===
In 1950, the Penn Campus was used as a conference site for midwifery. At the time, 25% of South Carolina births involved a midwife and more than 50% of births in Beaufort County involved a midwife. Co-sponsored with the State Board of Health, the conference was held at Penn Campus from 1950 to the 1970s.

Penn Center was one of the few places in the Jim Crow South where interracial groups could meet, leading the campus to have an important role in the Civil Rights Movement. Dr. Martin Luther King and his staff of the Southern Christian Leadership Conference held retreats here in the 1960s. Dr. King stayed at Gantt Cottage on the Penn Campus. A Retreat Center on the water was planned as a safer place for Dr. King to stay, but it was not completed before his death in 1968. It was, however, used by his associates, Rev. Andrew Young and Rev. James Bevel, during the Charleston Hospital Strike of 1969. Notable South Carolina figures in the civil rights movement, including Septima Clark, James McBride Dabbs, Esau Jenkins, and James Clyburn all had connections to Penn Center.

=== 2000s to present ===
With the creation of the Reconstruction Era National Monument (which in spring 2019 was elevated as an National Historic Park), Brick Baptist Church is protected by the National Park Service. Darrah Hall, which includes an adjacent parking area, has also been deeded over to the National Park Service.

The Penn Center Campus remains a place of historical preservation and educational operations. In January 2001, the Sea Island Reconstruction Heritage Partnership began. The group included members such as the City of Beaufort, the Town of Hilton Head, Beaufort County, and University of South Carolina Beaufort. The goal of the partnership was to preserve the Civil War, Reconstruction, and Civil Rights Movement history of the Lowcountry.

Penn Center was also added to the ‘Unesco Network of Places of History and Memory’ in 2024. The network's goal is to provide resources for the advancement of the center's preservation and educational mission as part of a five-year initiative.

== Penn Center buildings ==
- Brick Baptist Church (1855) (32.389754917802804°N 80.57606867793497°W), Although not part of Penn's Campus, the Brick Church on the northeast border has always fulfilled a significant role in Penn's History. Brick Church housed classes as Penn School moved from Oaks Plantation into their dedicated schoolhouse.
- Penn Center Bell Tower (1865), located next to the Benezet House, the Bell Tower housed a brass bell modeled after the Liberty Bell and bearing the inscription "Proclaim Liberty". The bell is now on display at Penn Center's museum.
- Darrah Hall (1882), the oldest building on Penn Center's campus, Darrah Hall has been a community nexus for over a hundred years.
- Alden Sales House (1900), built by the students, Alden Sales House has been used as a thrift shop and milk house.
- Hampton House (Penn Center) (1904) (32.388710°N 80.575835°W), was used as on-site housing for teachers and guests.
- Benezet House (1905) (32.388332°N 80.575288°W), the female teachers and students used Benezet House as their on-campus residence and this house was the center of home economics training.
- Cedar Cottage (1907), built to house Penn's single female teachers and nurse offices. Cedar Cottage is named after the abundant trees found on St. Helena Island.
- Jasmine Cottage (1911), built by Penn's carpentry students to house teachers.
- Cope Industrial Shop (1912) (32.387897°N 80.576541°W), this building housed all of the harness-making, wheelwrighting, blacksmith, basketry, carpentry, and cobbling classes. The building today houses Penn Center's York W. Bailey Museum.
- Emory S. Campbell Dining Hall (1917) (32.388493°N 80.575187°W), originally built as a laundry, the Dining Hall accommodates up to a hundred people and provides a variety of local Gullah-Style foods to Conference Center guests.
- Green Learning Center Rosenwald School (1920's), the learning center is utilized by the Program for Academic and Cultural Enrichment (PACE) as a daycare program.
- Pine Grove Cottage (1921), built by students as housing for the school's superintendent, Pine Cottage is used today to house guests of Penn Center.
- Lathers Memorial Dormitory (1922), was a memorial to Agnes Lathers, one of the early teachers at Penn. It was originally a dormitory for male students and teachers and is used today as administrative offices.
- Frissell Community House (1925) (32.389411°N 80.576675°W), built on the site of the original Penn Center schoolhouse, Frissell has been and is still used as a community gathering place, having even been used by the Southern Christian Leadership Conference for training and strategy meetings.
- Butler Building (Penn Center) (1931), built by Penn students, the Butler Building originally served as the place of the home economics departments, the graduates’ meeting room, the boy's clubhouse, exhibits, and the band room.
- Arnett House (1937), was used as housing for students and teachers from South Carolina State University working in the county schools. It is currently used for conference guests.
- The Potato House (1938), was used to stack sweet potatoes for curing. The Potato House is now fenced in and used for storage of farm machinery.
- Gantt Cottage (1940), the current Gantt Cottage was built by Penn students as a replacement to the original. During the 1960s, Martin Luther King, Jr. stayed at Gantt Cottage as he visited Penn Center for meetings and there wrote his "I Have A Dream" speech.
- Orchard Cottage (1942), built as a teacher's residence.
- The Cannery (Penn Center) (1946), originally built as a dairy barn, the cannery has been used for canning tomato and processing Conch.
- Retreat House and Dock (1968), built during the year of Martin Luther King, Jr.'s death, the Retreat House was planned as a more scenic and meditative place for his meetings over the smaller Gantt Cottage.

== Gallery ==
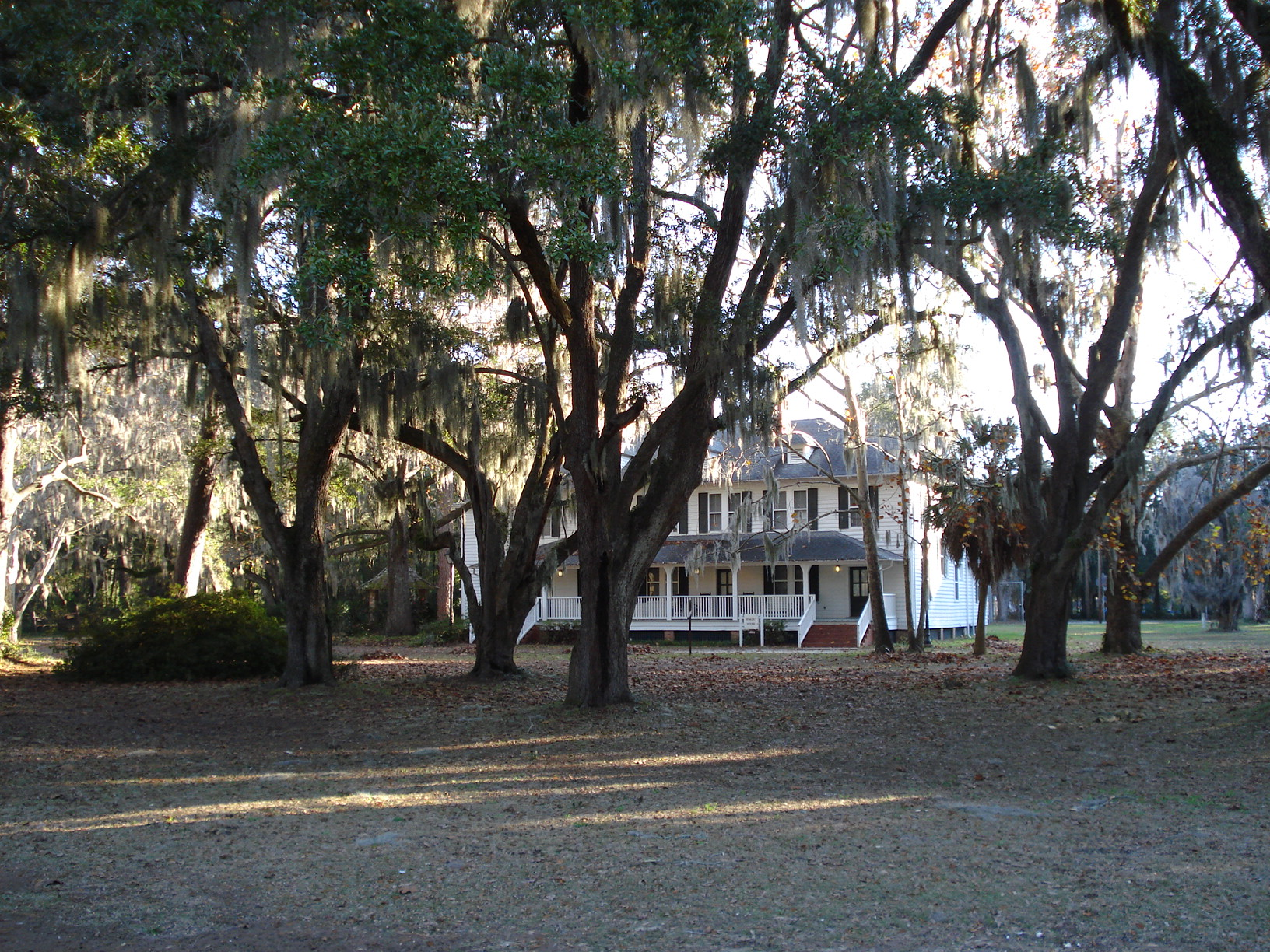
Benezet House

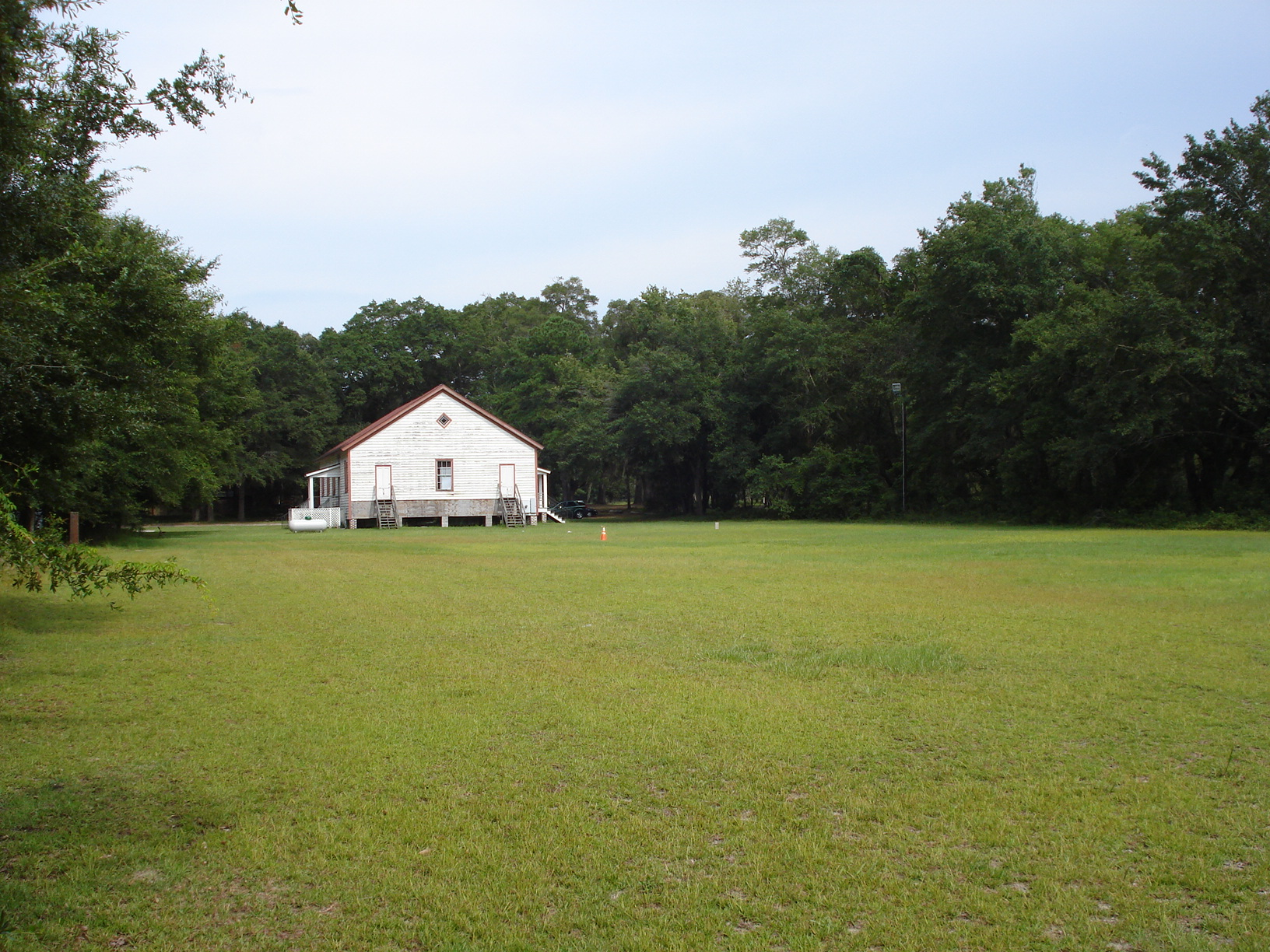
Back view of Darrah Hall

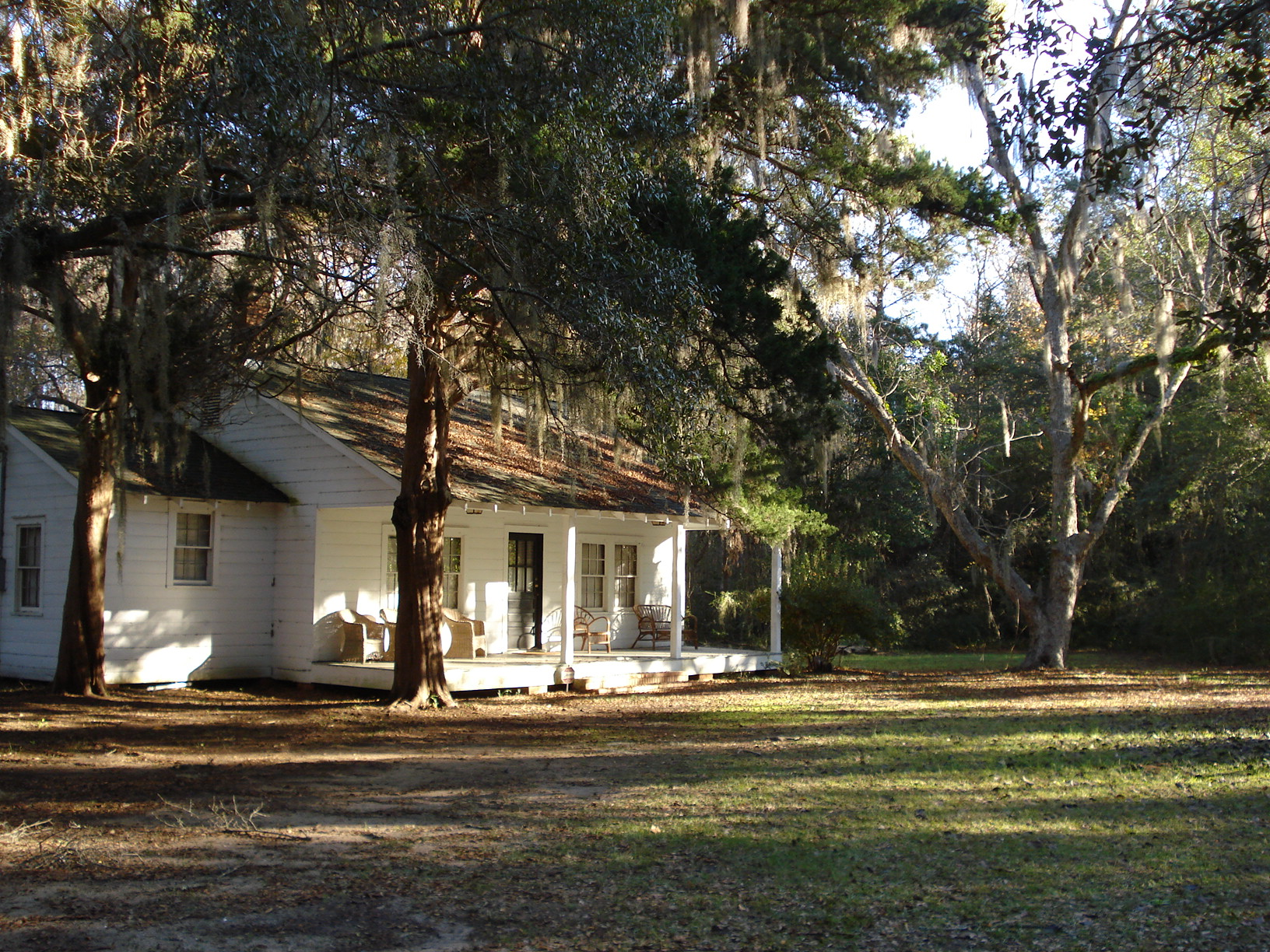
Orchard Cottage

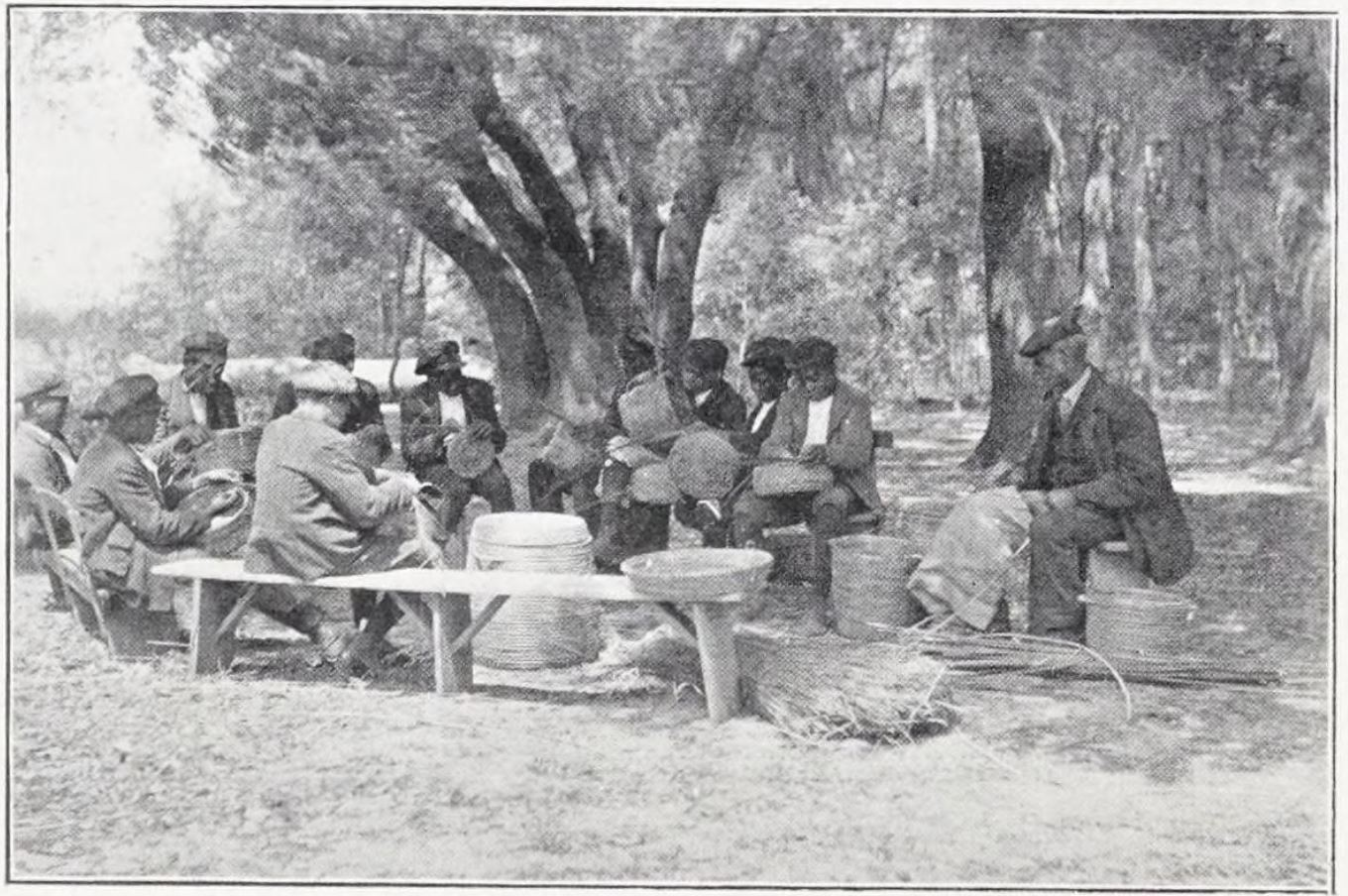
Basket making class

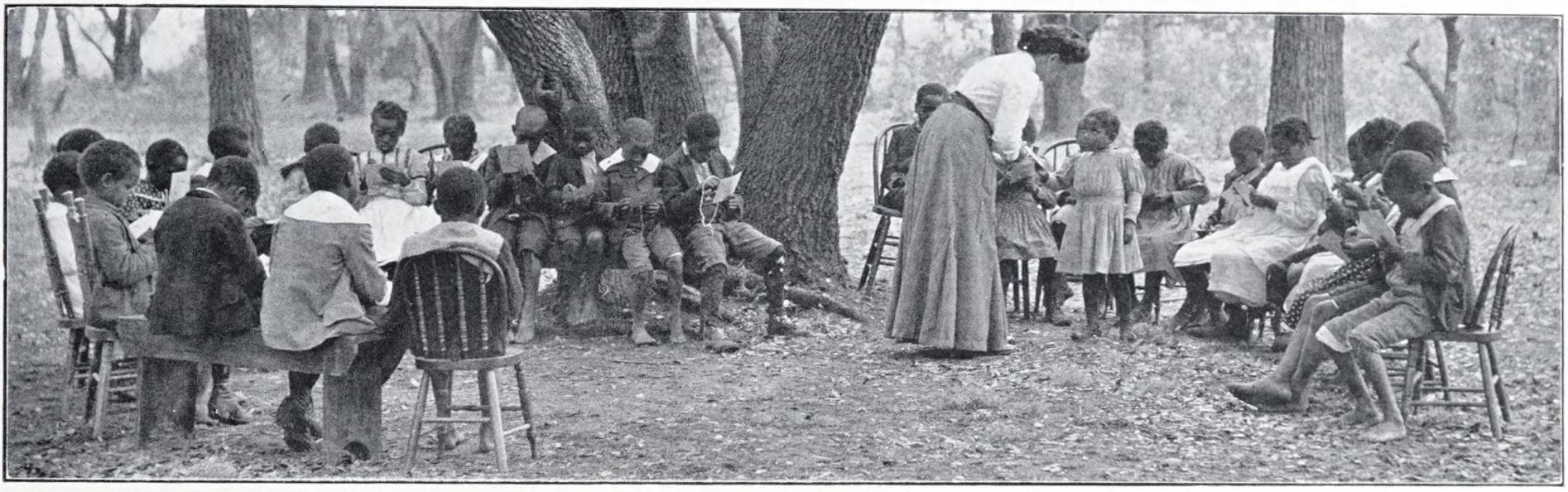
Sewing class

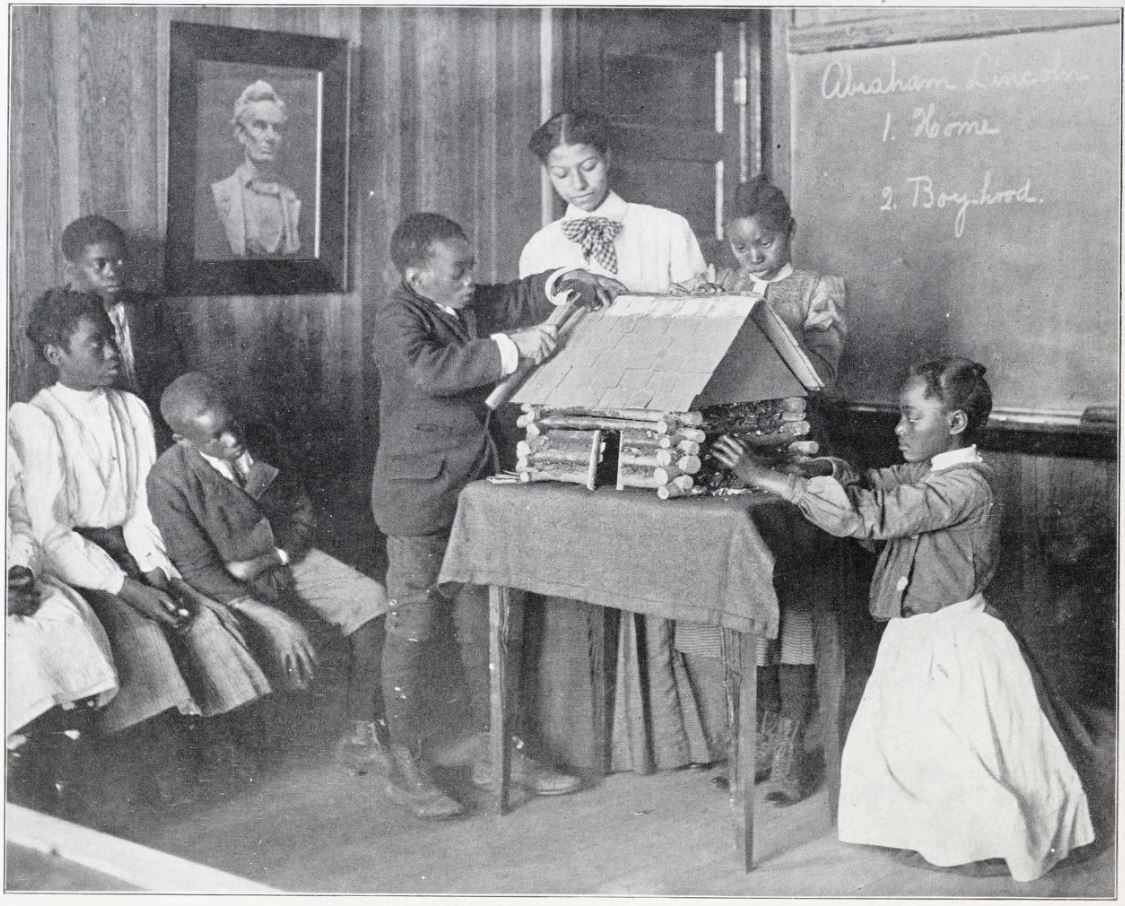
History class

== See also ==
- Reconstruction Era National Monument
- Gullah/Geechee Cultural Heritage Corridor
- List of National Historic Landmarks in South Carolina
- National Register of Historic Places listings in Beaufort County, South Carolina
