= Ella McCaleb =

American college dean (1856–1933)

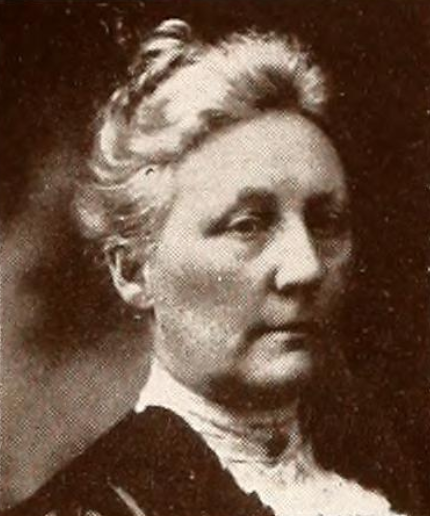
- Ella McCaleb, from the 1917 yearbook of Vassar College
- Born: April 23, 1856; Mount Pleasant, Pennsylvania, U.S.
- Died: January 9, 1933 (age 76); Poughkeepsie, New York, U.S.
- Occupation: College dean

Ella McCaleb (April 23, 1856 – January 9, 1933) was an American academic administrator. In 1913, she became the first dean of Vassar College, and she was the college's secretary during the presidencies of James Monroe Taylor and Henry Noble MacCracken.

== Early life and education ==
McCaleb was born in Mount Pleasant, Pennsylvania, the daughter of John Dicky McCaleb and Sarah Beidler Sherrick McCaleb. She graduated from Vassar College in 1878.

== Career ==
McCaleb taught school in New York and Detroit as a young woman. She was secretary to the acting president of Vassar College, James Ryland Kendrick, from 1885 to 1893, and secretary of the college from 1893 to 1913. Her position was renamed "dean" in 1913, making her the first dean of Vassar College. Her responsibilities included student discipline, scheduling classes, and alumnae relations. She defended the graduates of women's college from accusations of frivolity. She refused to condemn short skirts, short hair, makeup, and other women's fashions of the 1920s, as irrelevant to the intellect or morality of the wearer. "That she uses rouge indicates no spiritual deficiency," she commented in 1922.

McCaleb visited Vassar alumnae teaching in other states, including a stay with Rossa Belle Cooley at Penn School on Saint Helena Island, South Carolina, in 1921, and a visit with Annie Orton in Pasadena in 1928.

McCaleb retired from Vassar College in 1923, but continued to live on campus and participate in campus life. She represented Vassar College at the annual convocation of the University of the State of New York in 1924. In 1928 she attended the class of 1878's fiftieth reunion with her classmate, Harriot Stanton Blatch. In 1930 she officiated at a ceremony unveiling a memorial her former colleague, James Monroe Taylor.

== Personal life ==
McCaleb died in 1933, at the age of 76, at the campus home she shared with her sister, Effie McCaleb. Her papers are in the Vassar College archives.
