= Camp Saxton Site =

Archaeological site in South Carolina, United States

- U.S. National Register of Historic Places
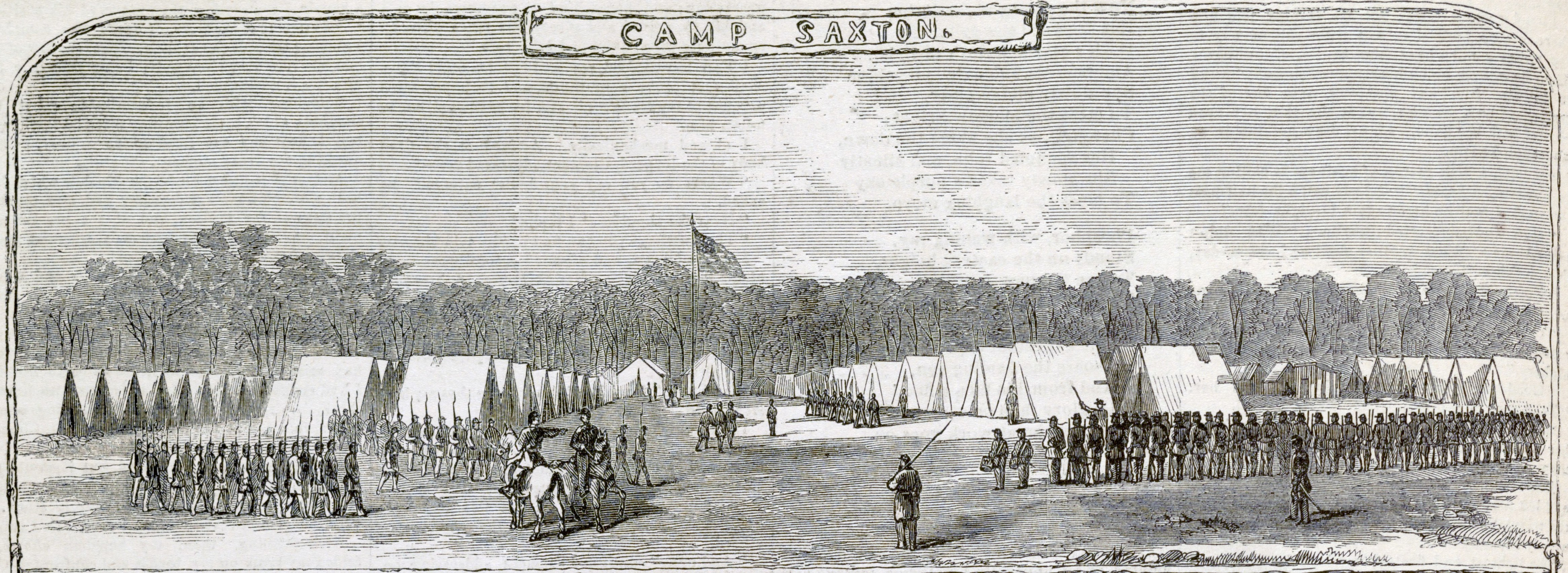
- Nearest city: Port Royal, South Carolina
- Area: 6 acres (2.4 ha)
- Built: 1862
- NRHP reference No.: 94001581
- Added to NRHP: February 2, 1995

The Camp Saxton Site is a 6-acre (24,000 m^{2}) property located in Port Royal, South Carolina. It was listed in the National Register Historic Places on February 2, 1995.

== Location and History ==
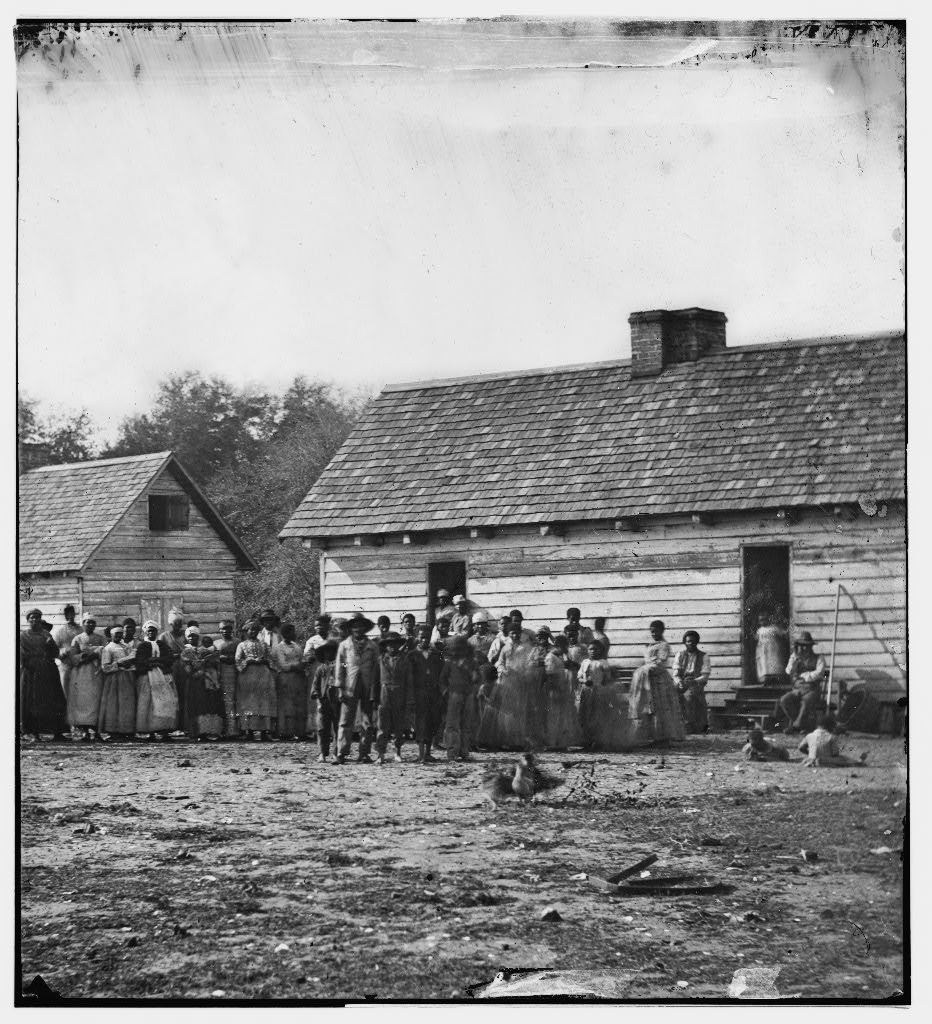
John Joyner Smith's Plantation, Beaufort, South Carolina, 1862 and Gullah contraband of war

Camp Saxton was previously the plantation of a slaveholder named John Joyner Smith. After the Battle of Port Royal on November 7, 1861, many of the white residents and plantation owners including Smith and his family fled the Sea Islands after the arrival of the Union Navy and Army. Union soldiers set up camp at the Smith plantation and renamed it Camp Saxton after Union General Rufus Saxton who was in charge of the military district in the area. Camp Saxton is situated along the Beaufort River, it is bounded on the east by the river, on the west by the United States Naval Hospital Beaufort complex, on the north by the boat basin off the Beaufort River and on the south by the ruins of the Fort Frederick Heritage Preserve.

The site contains an intact portion of the U.S. Union Army camp occupied from early November 1862 to late January 1863 by the 1st South Carolina Colored Infantry Regiment. The camp was the site of the Emancipation Proclamation ceremonies on January 1, 1863.

In January 2017, the Camp Saxton Site became part of the newly created Reconstruction Era National Monument, established by President Barack Obama.
