= Rufus Saxton =

American Civil War general (1824–1908)

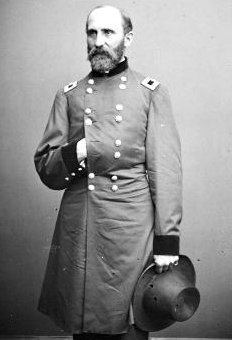
- Saxton possibly during the Civil War
- Born: October 19, 1824; Greenfield, Massachusetts, U.S.
- Died: February 23, 1908 (aged 83); Washington, D.C., U.S.
- Burial place: Arlington National Cemetery
- Military career
- Allegiance: United States (Union)
- Branch: U.S. Army (Union Army)
- Service years: 1849–1888
- Rank: Brevet Major General
- Conflicts: American Civil War
- Awards: Medal of Honor

Rufus Saxton (October 19, 1824 – February 23, 1908) was a Union Army brigadier general during the American Civil War who received America's highest military decoration, the Medal of Honor, for his actions defending Harpers Ferry during Confederate General Jackson's Valley Campaign. He was appointed military governor of the Department of the South in May 1862 and was involved with the Port Royal Experiment.

After the war, Saxton was a strong advocate for the enfranchisement of African Americans and served as the Freedmen's Bureau's first assistant commissioner. He was removed from his position in the government agency by President Andrew Johnson. Saxton died in Washington, D.C. in 1908.

== Early life ==
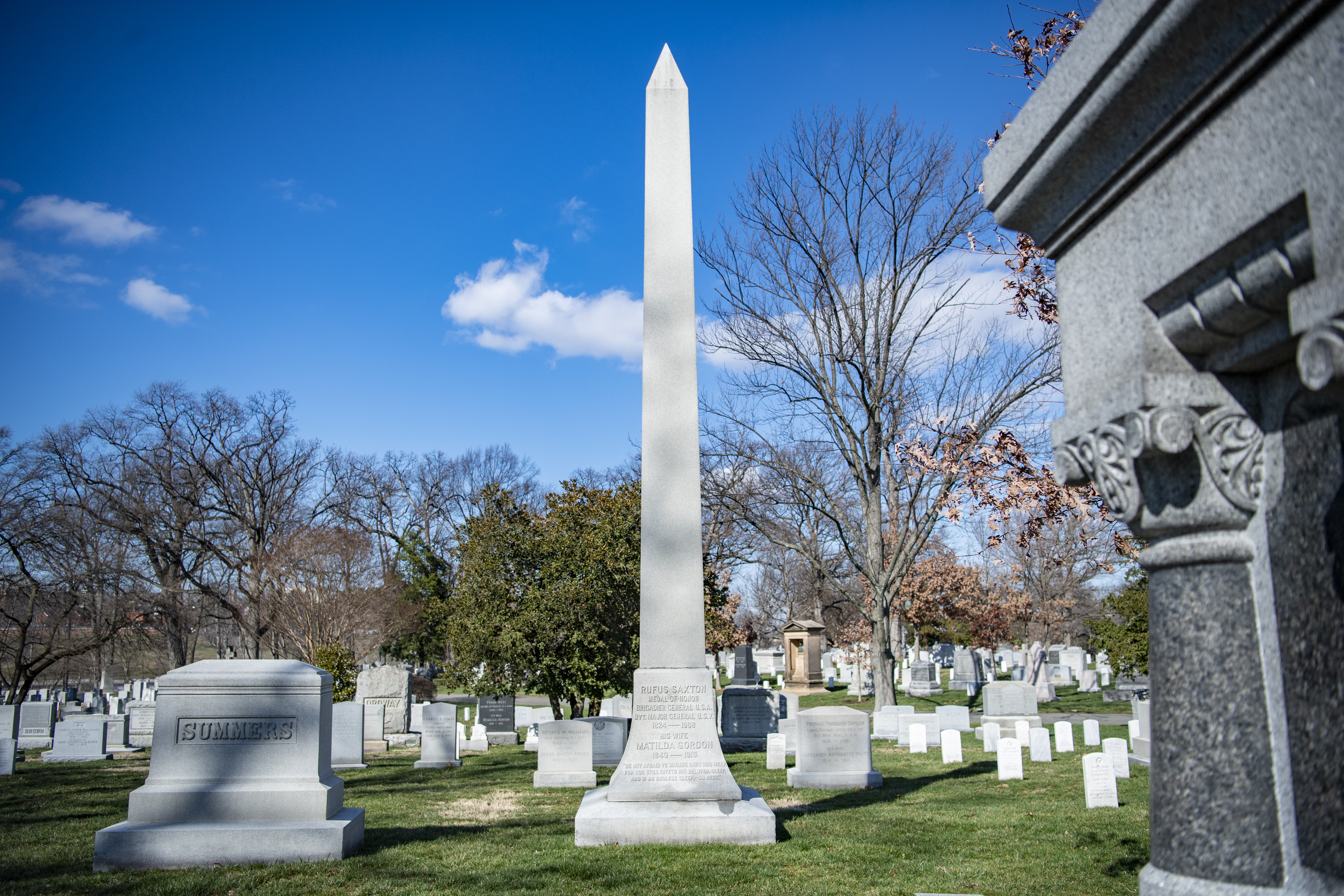
Grave at Arlington National Cemetery

Saxton was born in Greenfield, Massachusetts, to Jonathan and Miranda Saxton. His father was a Unitarian and a Transcendentalist whose feminist and abolitionist writings were heard on the lyceum circuit. He descended from a family of Unitarian ministers (Ashley, Williams, Edwards). His father attempted to secure a place for Rufus Saxton at Brook Farm in West Roxbury, Massachusetts, a transcendentalist community started by George Ripley and attended by Nathaniel Hawthorne. Rufus Saxton's brother Samuel Willard "Will" Saxton attended Brook Farm in his stead, learning the printing trade for the Farm's publication The Harbinger.

Rufus Saxton was educated at the United States Military Academy at West Point, graduating in 1849. His antebellum career included posts fighting Seminoles in Florida, teaching artillery tactics at West Point, surveying the uncharted Rocky Mountains on George B. McClellan's staff in advance of the Northern Pacific Railroad (1853), and map work for the Coastal Survey. He was promoted to first lieutenant in March 1855.

Rufus Saxton married a Philadelphian missionary, Mathilda Thompson, who had come South to teach the newly freed blacks with her newspaper journalist brother.

His brother Will joined Rufus Saxton in South Carolina as his aide-de-camp and printer during the Port Royal Experiment.

== Civil War ==
As the Civil War broke out, Saxton served as a quartermaster and ultimately a brigadier general for the Union forces. During the war, he commanded the Union defenses at Harpers Ferry and he was awarded the Medal of Honor for his "gallant service" there in May and June 1862. In an April 22, 1893 report about Saxton's award, The New York Times stated that "So far to only two other general officers have been awarded the medals, Gens. Schofield and Miles." In 1862, he was appointed quartermaster of the South Carolina Expeditionary Corps based at Hilton Head during much of Union occupation of the Island and was in charge of supplying contraband colonies in the region including on Edisto Island and at Port Royal He was appointed military governor of the Department of the South in May 1862 and was headquartered in Beaufort, South Carolina. As the military governor, he directed the recruitment of the first regiments of black soldiers called the First South Carolina Volunteer Infantry (33rd USCT) who fought in the Union army. Saxton recruited Gullah men from the surrounding South Carolina Sea Islands and other contrabands from Georgia and Florida. The recruitment and training of the 1st South Carolina took place at the Smith plantation that was renamed Camp Saxton after him.

== Postbellum career ==
In 1865, Saxton gave a speech at a black church in Charleston, South Carolina.

I want the colored men in this department to petition the president of the United States and congress for the right to exercise the elective franchise—the right to vote for those who are to rule over them.

Nobody can say a word in this department against the colored men signing a petition and sending it to the President of the United States. I want to see 150,000 colored men voting in South Carolina. I want to see the black man in the future save a nation's honor.

Your petition will have to be sent to President Johnson and to the congress, and congress will insure the right of the black man to vote in this country. I cannot see how it can be otherwise. I want you now to elect and choose a committee to draft this petition. Have it clearly, strongly worded, with good reasons why you should vote, and get every colored man to sign it. I can get 3,000 at Beaufort to sign it. But I want it started here in the city of Charleston, the leading city of the rebellion. I want it to lead off in the movement to insure your political equality.

Saxton later served as assistant commissioner for the Freedmen's Bureau, where he pursued the policy of settling freed slaves in land confiscated from white landowners in the Sea Islands, until he was removed from his position by President Andrew Johnson.

After the Civil War, Saxton remained in the Army, serving in the Quartermaster Corps.

He retired in 1888 as a colonel and assistant quartermaster general and lived in Washington, D.C. until his death. He was a member of the Military Order of the Loyal Legion of the United States and the Sons of the American Revolution.

He is interred in Arlington National Cemetery.

== African-American relations ==
Saxton was an abolitionist and proponent for greater civil rights for blacks. According to an account by his close personal friend, author Thomas Wentworth Higginson, Saxton "had been almost the only cadet in his time at West Point who was strong in anti-slavery feeling, and who thus began with antagonisms which lasted into actual service."

In 1866, Saxton testified before Congress's Joint Committee on Reconstruction, saying "I think if the Negro is put in possession of all his rights as a citizen and as a man, he will be peaceful, orderly, and self-sustaining as any other man or class of men, and that he will rapidly advance." Saxton also spoke in Congress against widespread confiscation of firearms owned by African-Americans, stating such actions were "clear and direct violation of their personal rights" as described in the Second Amendment.

Saxton appointed his friend, author and abolitionist Thomas Wentworth Higginson, colonel of the 1st South Carolina Volunteers, the first official black regiment. Rufus Saxton figures prominently in Higginson's book Army Life in a Black Regiment (1870). On the anniversary of the Emancipation Proclamation, Higginson and Saxton were both presented with engraved silver ceremonial swords by the freedmen.

== Namesake ==
The Saxton School established to educate African Americans in Charleston was named for him. Battery Barlow-Saxton at Fort MacArthur is named in his honor.

== Medal of Honor citation ==

Rank and Organization:

Brigadier General, U.S. Volunteers. Place and date: The Shenandoah Valley Campaign at Harpers Ferry, Virginia, 26 to May 30, 1862. Entered service at: Deerfield, Massachusetts Birth: Greenfield, Massachusetts Date of issue: April 25, 1893.

Citation:

Distinguished gallantry and good conduct in the defense.

== See also ==
- List of Medal of Honor recipients
- List of American Civil War Medal of Honor recipients: Q–S
- List of American Civil War generals (Union)
- List of Massachusetts generals in the American Civil War
