= Laura Matilda Towne =

American educator (1825–1901)

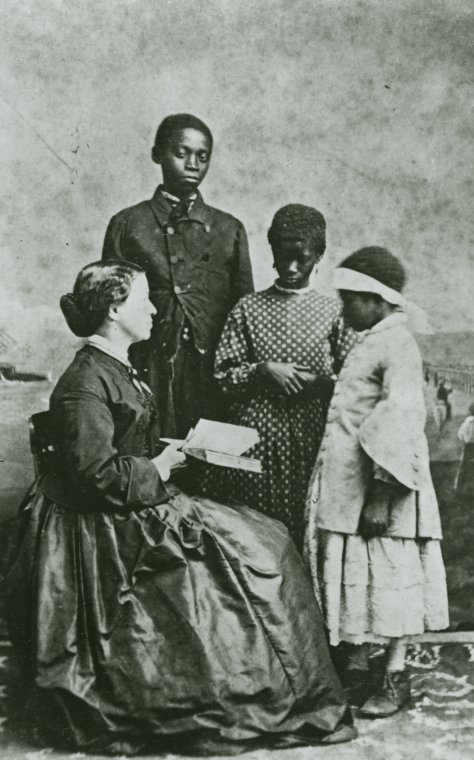
- Portrait of teacher Laura M. Towne with students Dick, Maria and Amoretta
- Born: May 3, 1825; Pittsburgh, Pennsylvania, U.S.
- Died: February 22, 1901 (aged 75); Saint Helena Island, South Carolina, U.S.
- Resting place: Laurel Hill Cemetery, Philadelphia, Pennsylvania, U.S.
- Occupation: Educator

Laura Matilda Towne (May 3, 1825 – February 22, 1901) was an American abolitionist and educator who founded the first school in the United States for the education of freedmen, the Penn School, in 1862 on Saint Helena Island, South Carolina. The school was established as part of the Port Royal Experiment during the American Civil War.

== Early life and education ==
Towne was born on May 3, 1825, in Pittsburgh, Pennsylvania, to John Towne and Sarah Robinson.

She was raised in Philadelphia by her father after her mother's early death. She was educated in Boston and Philadelphia. She studied homeopathic medicine privately under Dr. Constantine Hering and at the Female Medical College of Pennsylvania. She enrolled in Penn Medical University but there is no record of her receiving a degree.

== Career ==
She was raised in Philadelphia and was influenced by sermons about the abolition of slavery by William Henry Furness at the First Unitarian Church of Philadelphia. She volunteered in several charity schools in the late 1850s and at the start of the American Civil War in 1861, she was working as a teacher at a school in Newport, Rhode Island. After the Union Army captured Port Royal, South Carolina, and the Sea Islands, the slave-owning plantation owners fled and abandoned over 10,000 slaves. The former slaves soon began to suffer from hunger and disease. Salmon P. Chase, the secretary of the United States Treasury, appointed abolitionist Edward L. Pierce to solve the suffering of the slaves and salvage the valuable cotton crops. He developed the Port Royal Experiment where freed slaves continued to work the land abandoned by slave owners.

Towne volunteered to educate the freed slaves and sailed there in April 1862. Her initial role was as housekeeper and secretary to Pierce, but her role evolved to providing medical services and teaching. With the help of her Quaker friend Ellen Murray they founded the Penn School on Saint Helena Island, the first school for newly freed slaves in the United States.

The school started with nine students and operated out of a back room of the Oaks plantation house. In September 1862, as enrollment increased, they moved the location to the Brick Church. Towne and Murray were joined by Charlotte Forten, the first African American teacher in the area, and they implemented a classical school curriculum similar to the schools they had attended in Boston and Philadelphia. Laura Towne and Murray spent the next forty years of their lives ministering to the freed slaves, developing their trust, providing them with medical care, teaching them to read and write, and fighting for their land rights.

After the Civil War, the Penn School was the only secondary school available on the Sea Islands to African Americans. Towne worked to maintain the school and funded teacher's salaries with her own money. She also worked as a public health official and supported the temperance organization Band of Hope.

She took care of the school for the rest of her life and eventually gave up practicing medicine. She planned to have the school taken over by Hollis B. Frissell of the Hampton Normal and Industrial Institute. However, after Towne's death, new management took over the school and Murray's role in the school was limited. The school was renamed the Penn Normal, Industrial, and Agricultural School and the curriculum was changed by its second principal, Rossa Belle Cooley, to emphasize agriculture and carpentry for boys, and nursing and home economics for girls. The Penn School became a part of the South Carolina public school system in 1948.

In 1867, Towne and Murray purchased and lived on a former plantation on Saint Helena Island named Frogmore. She died at Frogmore on February 22, 1901, due to influenza and was interred in Laurel Hill Cemetery in Philadelphia. A monument was erected in the Brick Church graveyard on Saint Helena Island in her memory.
