= Reconstruction Era National Historical Park =

National Historical Park of the United States in South Carolina

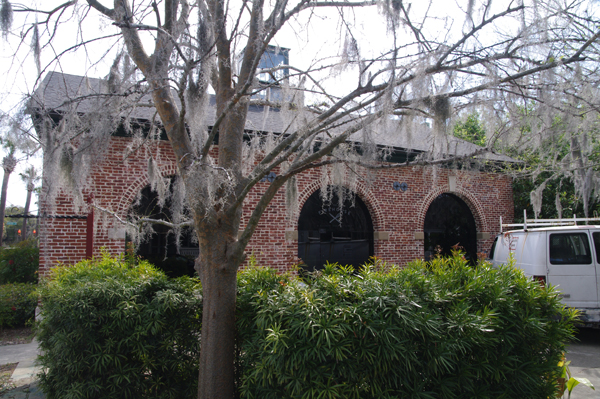
- The Old Beaufort Firehouse, site of Reconstruction Era National Historical Park Visitor Center, March 2011

- Location within South Carolina Location within the United States
- 32°25′57″N 80°40′14″W
- Location: Beaufort County, South Carolina

Site notes
- Area: 64.99 acres (26.30 ha)
- Visitors: 23,206 (in 2025)
- Website: Reconstruction Era National Historical Park

U.S. National Monument
- Designated: January 12, 2017

The Reconstruction Era National Historical Park, formerly Reconstruction Era National Monument, is a United States National Historical Park in Beaufort County, South Carolina established by President Barack Obama in January 2017 to preserve and commemorate activities during the Reconstruction Era that followed the American Civil War. The monument was the first U.S. National Monument dedicated to the Reconstruction Era. The John D. Dingell Jr. Conservation, Management, and Recreation Act, signed March 12, 2019, by President Donald Trump, re-designated it as a national historical park. It is administered by the National Park Service.

== Creation of the monument ==
The campaign to create a Reconstruction Era National Monument spanned fifteen years, beginning in the final days of the Bill Clinton administration, when outgoing Interior Secretary Bruce Babbitt visited the Beaufort area, accompanied by historian Eric Foner, author of the book Reconstruction: America's Unfinished Revolution, 1863-1877. The initial effort to create the national monument failed in Congress amid opposition from the Sons of Confederate Veterans. In 2004, when the creation of a Beaufort Reconstruction History Park was being considered, the Sons of Confederate Veterans organized a campaign to persuade U.S. Representative Joe Wilson (who then represented the area of the proposed park) to oppose it. After receiving letters from the group's members and meeting with the group, Wilson told the National Park Service that he would not support the park.

The proposal was revived in 2015, however, after two historians commissioned by the Park Service — Gregory Downs of the University of California, Davis and Kate Masur of Northwestern University—undertook a field study of sites associated with the Reconstruction era and issued a report entitled National Historical Landmark Theme Study on the U.S. Reconstruction Era, 1861–1898. At an April 2016 symposium entitled "The Reconstruction Era: History and Public Memory" in Columbia, South Carolina, sponsored by Historic Columbia and the University of South Carolina History Center, Downs, Masur, and others spoke. At that symposium, a Park Service official indicated that opposition to the proposed national monument from the Sons of Confederate Veterans had softened.

Two U.S. Representatives from South Carolina, Democrat Jim Clyburn and Republican Mark Sanford (whose district has included Beaufort since redistricting in 2010), were major champions of the monument's designation and had sought to create the monument via an act of Congress. A proposal to create the Reconstruction Era National Monument through executive action received overwhelming support at a public meeting held by Clyburn and the Park Service in December 2016. The great-great-grandson of Robert Smalls—a freed slave who rose to become a member of Congress from South Carolina during Reconstruction—was a supporter of the monument's designation.

The Reconstruction Era National Monument, created in the final days of President Obama's term, was established on the same day as two National Monuments honoring the American civil rights movement: the Freedom Riders National Monument and the Birmingham Civil Rights National Monument. Obama created the monuments using his executive authority under the Antiquities Act, which confers upon the president the unilateral authority to create most national monuments.

A public dedication ceremony was held in March 2017. The monument's dedication was also celebrated at that year's annual Original Gullah Festival.

== Sites that are part of the historical park ==
The monument includes four locations in and near Beaufort, South Carolina. The Beaufort area came under the control of the Union Army in November 1861. As a result, it was one of the first places in the United States where emancipated slaves "voted, bought property and created churches, schools and businesses." The four sites that are part of the park are:

- Darrah Hall at Penn Center (originally Penn School): Founded in 1862, this was an early school in the South for freed slaves. In 1864, it moved to its current location (now part of the monument) on Saint Helena Island. Even before the national monument was declared, Penn Center was part of a National Historic Landmark District. It is significant not only for its association with Reconstruction and civil rights, but also as a center of Gullah cultural heritage.
- Brick Baptist Church: Located next to Penn Center, this church building was constructed in 1855 "by slaves who were relegated to its balcony out of the sight and presence of white worshipers." In 1861, after the Battle of Port Royal, some 8,000 freed slaves took control of the church. It is the oldest church on Saint Helena Island.
- The Old Beaufort Firehouse (706 Craven Street) in downtown Beaufort, near other historically significant sites. The old firehouse, which is also part of the 304-acre Beaufort National Historic District, now houses the visitor center for the national historic park.
- Camp Saxton Site/Emancipation Grove at Port Royal — this is the location where Union Army General Rufus Saxton publicly read the Emancipation Proclamation to a gathering of 3,000 slaves from the surrounding Sea Islands on New Year's Day 1863. Additionally, it was the site where some of the first African-Americans were mustered into the U.S. Army, as enlisted soldiers in the 1st South Carolina Volunteers. The Emancipation Oak, an oak tree, is located in a nearby grove. The area is now part of Naval Hospital Beaufort. The official building for the Camp Saxton site is located at the Naval Heritage Park. A small white church, called Pinckney Porter's Chapel, houses the exhibits for Camp Saxton.

The Reconstruction Era National Historic Network is an organization run by the National Park Service that includes national parks and community places such as colleges, churches, and museums. It connects historical sites, archives, and educational programs across the United States related to the Reconstruction era.

== See also ==
- African-American history
- History of South Carolina
- National Register of Historic Places listings in Beaufort County, South Carolina
