= Gullah-Geechee Cultural Heritage Corridor =

Federal National Heritage Area in the United States

Coordinates: 32.4327°N 80.6704°W

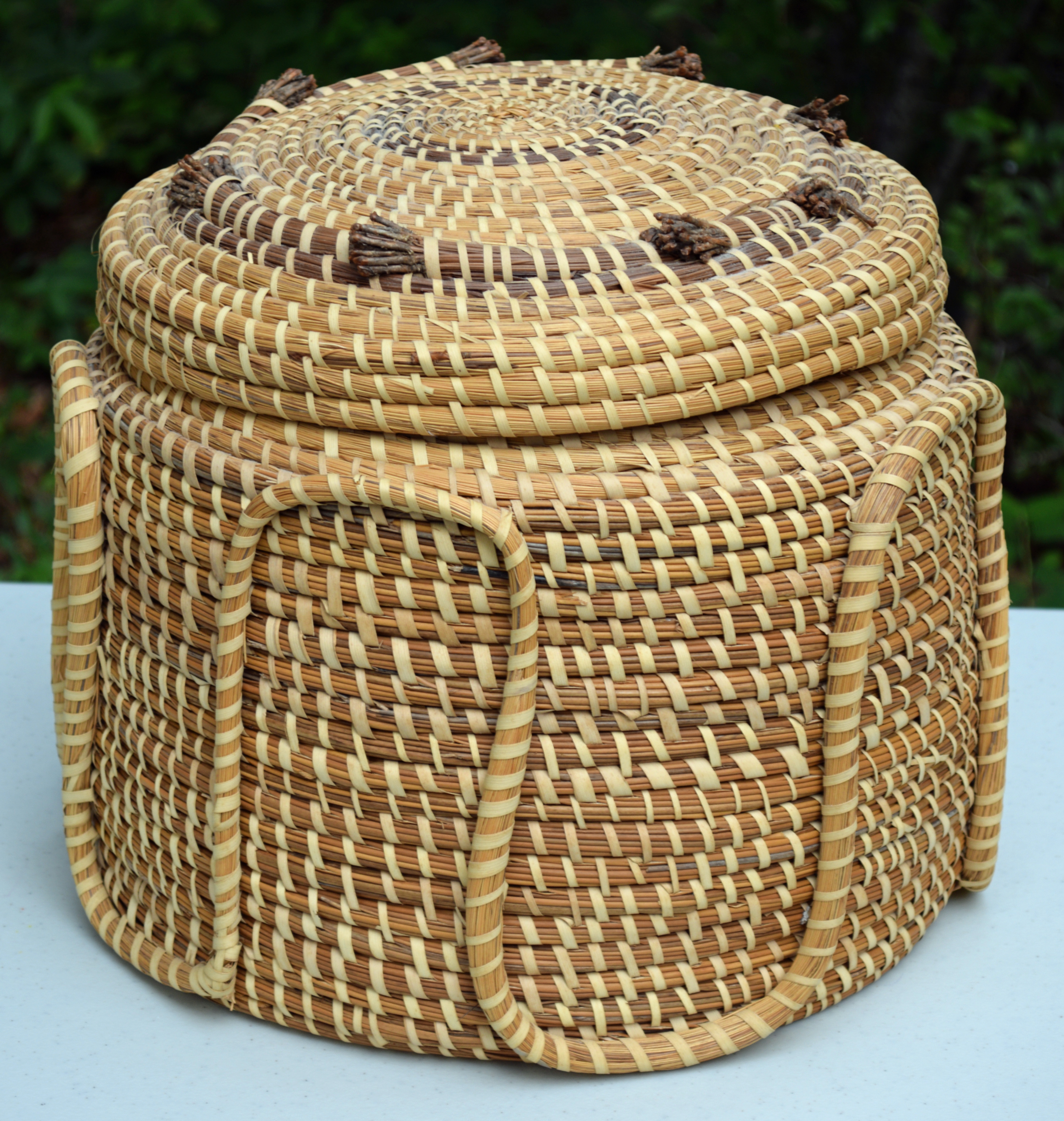
Sweetgrass basket made by the Gullah culture of coastal Georgia or South Carolina

The Gullah-Geechee Cultural Heritage Corridor is a federal National Heritage Area in the United States along its southeastern coast, stretching from North Carolina to Florida. The intent of the designation is to help preserve and interpret the traditional cultural practices, sites, and resources associated with Gullah-Geechee people. Gullah-Geechee Cultural Heritage Corridor, and the federal Gullah-Geechee Cultural Heritage Corridor Commission established to oversee it, were designated by an act of Congress on October 12, 2006, through the National Heritage Areas Act of 2006.

The Gullah-Geechee Cultural Heritage Corridor was the result of more than 15 years of research of a Gullah-Geechee descendant Derek Hankerson, Kristopher Smith, Diane Miller and others. They established the Gullah-Geechee Cultural Heritage Corridor, spanning from Pender County, NC, to St. Johns County, FL in 2006 and helped raise Fort Mose in St. Augustine as both a national historical site and part of the corridor.

The Gullah-Geechee Cultural Heritage Corridor extends along the coast of the southeastern United States through North Carolina, South Carolina, Georgia and Florida in recognition of the Gullah-Geechee people and culture. Gullah-Geechee are direct descendants of West African slaves brought into the United States around the 1700s. They were forced to work in rice paddies, cotton fields and indigo plantations along the South Carolina-Georgia seaboard where the warm and moist climate conditions helped them to preserve many African traditions. After the abolition of slavery, Gullah-Geechee people settled in remote villages around the coastal swath, where, thanks to their relative isolation, they formed strong communal ties and a unique culture that has endured for centuries.

The corridor is administered as a National Heritage Area in partnership between the National Park Service and local governments and cultural and tourism authorities.

The corridor is specifically focused on 79 Atlantic barrier islands within the designated area and their African-American inhabitants, and adjoining areas within 30 miles (48 km) of the coastline. The corridor includes Charles Pinckney National Historic Site, from which it is administered.
