= African American Christianity during Slavery =

The establishment, growth and development of African American Christianity during slavery goes from the colonial period until emancipation. While some African slaves had a prior exposure to Christianity—particularly Catholicism from the Congo Delta—or Islam, almost all first encountered Protestant Christianity in North America. Over time, African American Christianity became a distinctive form of Christian practice that combined evangelical teachings with African religious traditions.

Anglican missionaries such as the Society for the Propagation of the Gospel in Foreign Parts were often the first to preach the Gospel, with limited success. Starting in the 1730s, the First Great Awakening leading to the rise of Methodists and Baptists in the South brought evangelical preaching to enslaved communities, appealing to them through messages of spiritual equality and deliverance. Black worshippers often faced restrictions: they were segregated from white congregants and often prohibited from leadership roles. Nevertheless, clandestine gatherings known as hush harbors and the formation of "invisible churches" allowed slaves to worship freely, and adapt Christian teachings to their own experiences, and incorporate African rhythms and traditions into worship.

By the early 19th century, African Americans established independent black churches and congregations, often led by freedmen, such as the African Methodist Episcopal Church founded by Richard Allen in 1816. These churches became centers of resistance and community support. Christianity also played a complex role in the ideology of slavery : slaveholders used biblical passages to justify enslavement and enforce obedience, while slave preachers and communities drew upon biblical narratives like the Exodus for inspiration in seeking freedom and equality.

== Early conversions ==
Some slaves were already Christian before colonization, as the Bakongo people of Central-Africa had converted to Catholicism shortly after Portuguese contact in the late-15th century. Others were Muslim from West-Africa, such as the Mandinka, Fulani, and Wolof. Edmund Ruffin believed that slaves who came from Africa rarely became Protestant Christians, and the significant numbers of conversions started with the first generation born in America.

Protestant Christianity was the dominant religion of Colonial America and then the United States, including the slaveholding areas and the individual planters. Slaves learned about Western Christianity by attending services led by a white preacher or supervised by a white person. Slaveholders often held prayer meetings at their plantations. In the South, until the Great Awakening, most Christian slaveholders were Anglican. In praise settings where whites supervised by worship and prayer, they used Bible stories that reinforced people's keeping to their places in society, urging slaves to be loyal and to obey their masters. In the 19th century, Methodist and Baptist chapels were founded in many of the smaller communities and common planters.

The Anglican Society for the Propagation of the Gospel in Foreign Parts which was founded in 1701, concentrated more on slaves within the West Indies, which had a certain amount of success in South Carolina. Leadership roles for slaves were often restricted in Episcopalian churches. "Episcopal congregations accepted slaves and free African-Americans as subordinate members, kept African-Americans segregated, and saw black members as suitable objects for mission work but unsuitable for leadership. Abolitionist propaganda portrayed low rates of church participation by slaves, although W. E. B. Du Bois used church records to estimate that about one in six slaves was owned to a denomination, which was about equal to Southern white participation.

Following slave revolts in the early 19th century, including Nat Turner's Rebellion in 1831, Virginia passed a law requiring African American congregations to meet only in the presence of a white minister. Other states similarly restricted on exclusively African American churches or large groups of Black Americans in large groups unsupervised by white individuals. Nevertheless, Black Baptist congregations in cities grew rapidly, and their members numbered several hundred each before the American Civil War. While mostly led by freedmen, most members were slaves.

== Great Awakening ==
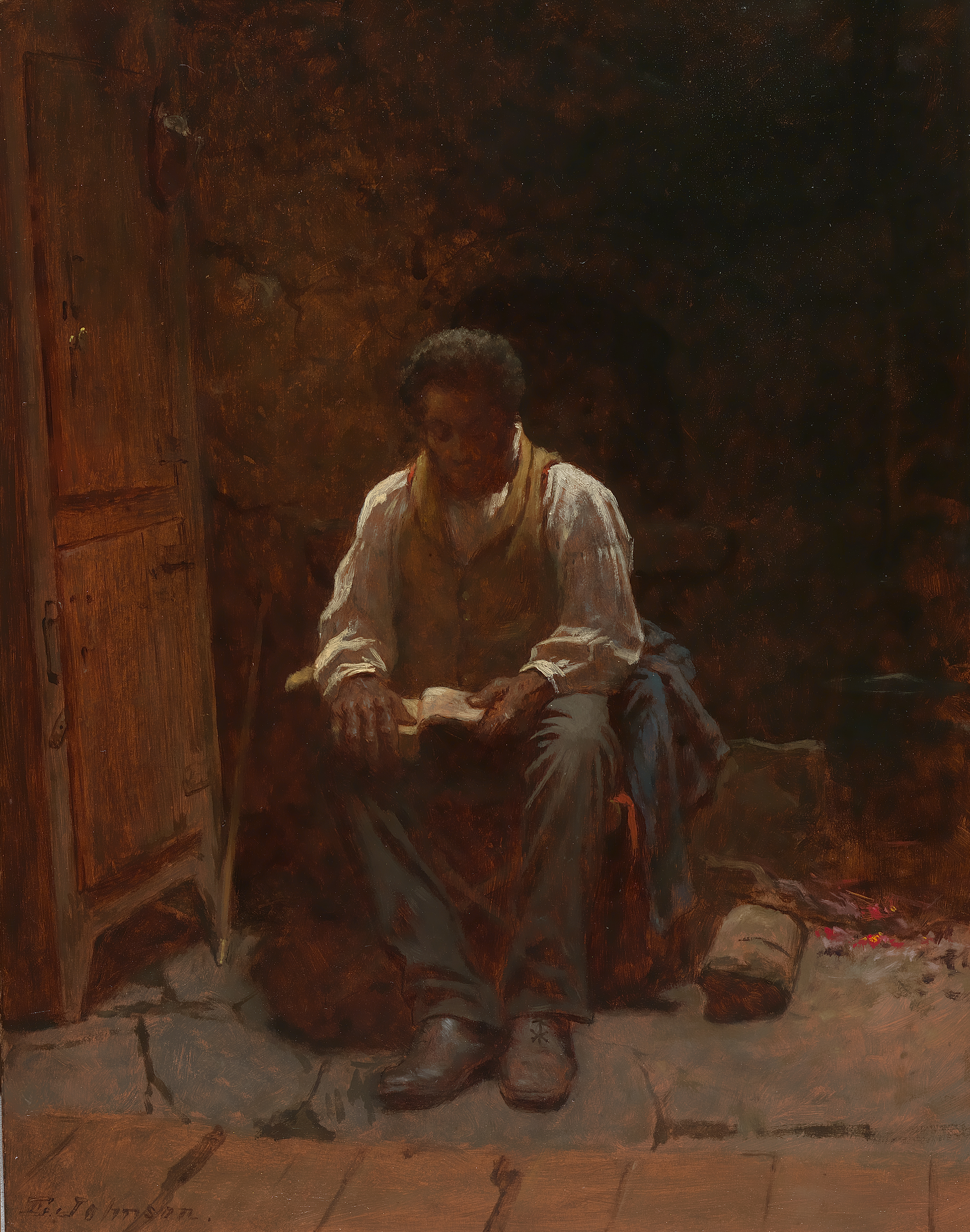
Eastman Johnson's 1863 oil painting painting The Lord is My Shepherd (Smithsonian American Art Museum 1979.5.13)

The First Great Awakening in the late 18th century led to changes in Americans' understanding of God, themselves, the world around them, and religion. In the southern Tidewater and Low Country, northern Baptist and Methodist preachers converted both white and black people -both free and enslaved. These new members were appealed to directly and a few thousand were converted and they were welcomed into white churches, with their religious experiences. While also admitting them to active roles in congregations as exhorters, deacons, and even preachers, although the last was a rarity.

The message of spiritual equality appealed to many enslaved people, and, as African religious traditions continued to decline in North America, black people accepted Christianity in large numbers for the first time.

Evangelical leaders in the southern colonies had to deal with the issue of slavery more frequently than those in the North. Although in the early years of the First Great Awakening, Methodist and Baptist preachers argued for manumission of slaves and abolition, by the early decades of the 19th century, they often had found ways to support the institution.

George Whitefield's sermons reiterated an egalitarian message but only translated into spiritual equality for Africans in the colonies, who mostly remained enslaved. Whitefield was known to criticize slaveholders who treated enslaved people cruelly and those who did not educate them, but he had no intention to abolish slavery. He lobbied to have slavery reinstated in Georgia and proceeded to become a slaveholder himself. Whitefield shared a common belief held among evangelicals that, after conversion, slaves would be granted true equality in heaven. Despite his stance on slavery, Whitefield became influential among many Africans.

The Presbyterian Samuel Davies was noted for preaching to African enslaved people who converted to Christianity in unusually large numbers, and he is credited with the first sustained proselytization of enslaved people in Virginia. Davies wrote a letter in 1757 in which he refers to the religious zeal of an enslaved man whom he had encountered during his journey. "I am a poor slave, brought into a strange country, where I never expect to enjoy my liberty. While I lived in my own country, I knew nothing of that Jesus I have heard you speak so much about. I lived quite careless what will become of me when I die; but I now see such a life will never do, and I come to you, Sir, that you may tell me some good things, concerning Jesus Christ, and my Duty to GOD, for I am resolved not to live any more as I have done."

Davies became accustomed to hearing such excitement from many black people who were exposed to the revivals. He believed that black people could attain knowledge equal to that of white people if given an adequate education, and he promoted the importance of allowing slaveholders to permit enslaved people to become literate so that they could become more familiar with the instructions of the Bible.

The emotional worship of the revivals appealed to many Africans, and African leaders started to emerge from the revivals in substantial numbers soon after they converted. These figures paved the way for the establishment of the first black congregations and churches in the American colonies.

== Invisible Church ==
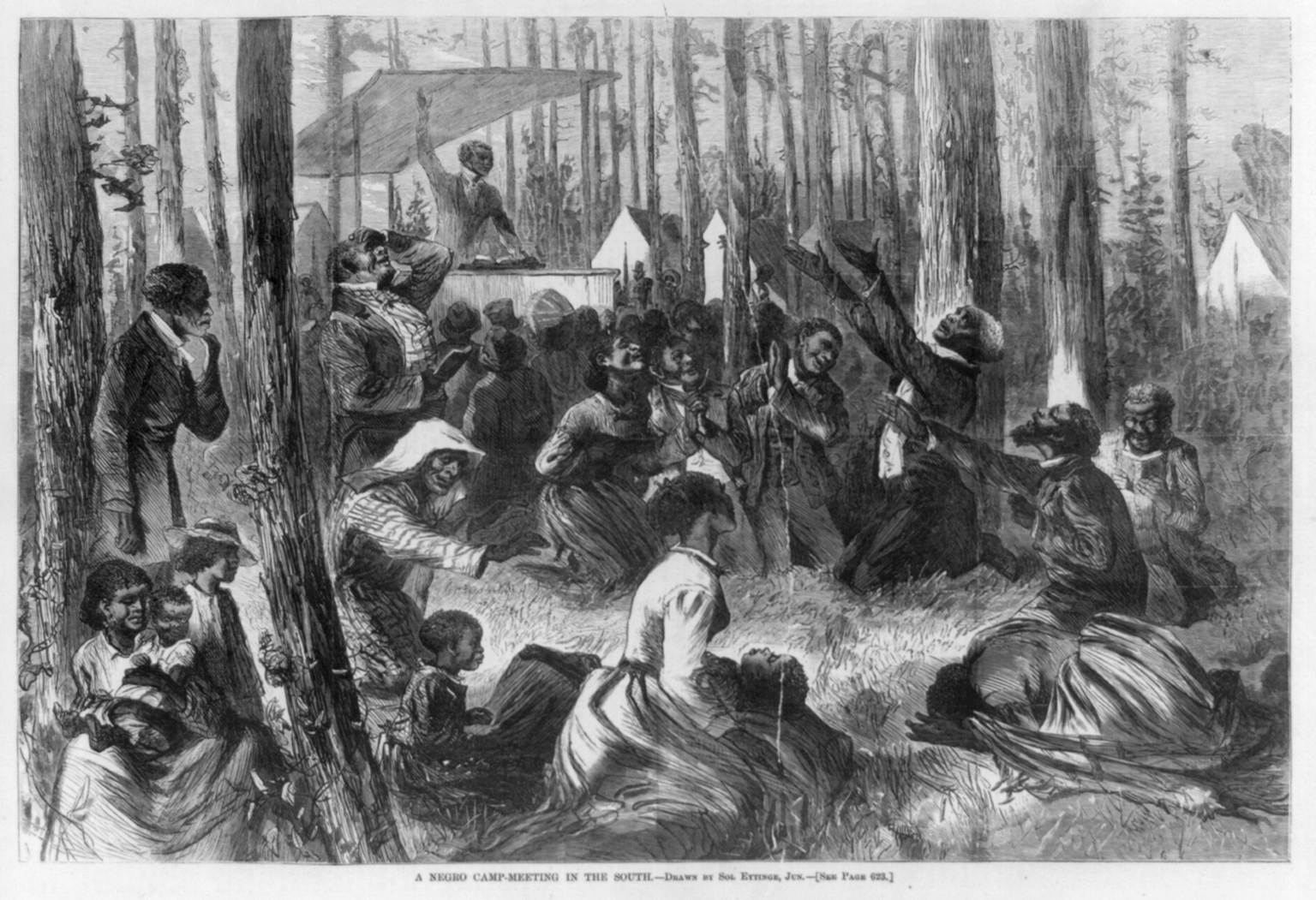
During slavery, African American churches commonly assembled in secret places known as the hush harbors.

During this era, there is evidence of Christian practice and "specific dedicated places for worship called praise houses from before the first organized African American Christian denominations.

In plantation areas, slaves organized underground churches and hidden religious meetings, the "invisible church", where slaves were free to mix Evangelical Christianity with African beliefs and African rhythms. With the time, many incorporated Wesleyan Methodist hymns, gospel songs, and spirituals. The underground churches provided psychological refuge from the white world. The spirituals gave the church members a secret way to communicate and, in some cases, to plan a rebellion.

== Christianity in the ideology of slavery ==
Christianity played a complex and often contradictory role in the lives of slaves. During the era of slavery in the United States, many slave owners strategically used Black churches and Black preachers to propagate messages of obedience, submission, and compliance among enslaved people. This was part of a larger system of control that sought to use religion as a tool to maintain the institution of slavery, although Christian teaching as well as maintaining the social order also brought in concepts such as equality before God and spiritual freedom that were corrosive to master-slave relations.

Slave owners often introduced Christianity to enslaved Africans, selectively emphasizing biblical teachings that they believed justified slavery and encouraged submission to masters. Scripture verses such as (Colossians 3:22 Ephesians 6:5) ("Slaves, obey your earthly masters with respect and fear...") were frequently cited to reinforce the idea that slavery was divinely sanctioned.

During the early decades of the 19th century, they used stories such as the Curse of Ham to justify slavery to themselves. They promoted the idea that loyal and hard-working slaves would be rewarded in the afterlife. Slaves who were literate tried to teach others to read, as Frederick Douglass did while still enslaved as a young man in Maryland.

Many slaves, of Kongo origin, retained and continued to practice their traditional religion, which had been syncretised with Catholicism in Africa. These include belief in the Kongo Cosmogram, which they inscribed on the Church floors and expressed through the Ring Shout.

As they listened to readings, slaves developed their own interpretations of the Scriptures and found inspiration in stories of deliverance, such as the Exodus out of Egypt. Nat Turner, a slave and a Baptist preacher, was inspired to guide an armed rebellion against slavery, in an uprising that killed about 50 white people in Virginia.

== Underground Railroad ==
Free Black communities in Indiana, Illinois, Ohio, Philadelphia, Pennsylvania, and New York helped freedom seekers escape from slavery. Black Churches were stops on the Underground Railroad, and Black communities in the North hid freedom seekers in their churches and homes. Harriet Tubman was one of the most famous “conductors” of the Underground Railroad, personally leading hundreds of enslaved people to freedom without ever being captured. Historian Cheryl Janifer Laroche explained in her book, Free Black Communities and the Underground Railroad: The Geography of Resistance that: "Blacks, enslaved and free, operated as the main actors in the central drama that was the Underground Railroad."

Along with white churches opposed to slavery, free black people in Philadelphia provided aid and comfort to slaves who escaped and helped all new arrivals adjust to city life.

== Independent churches ==
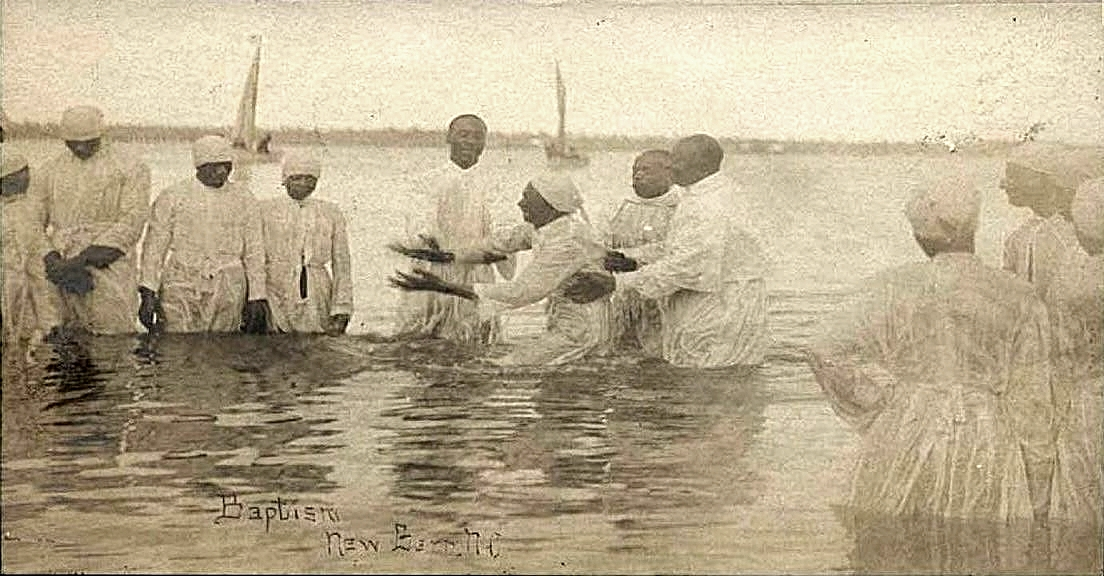
"Wade in the water." A postcard of a river baptism in New Bern, North Carolina, around 1900.

Free black Americans in both Northern and Southern U.S. cities formed their own congregations and churches before the end of the 18th century. They organized independent African American congregations and churches to practice religion apart from white oversight.

In 1787 in Philadelphia, the black church was born out of protest and revolutionary reaction to racism. Resenting being relegated to a segregated gallery at St. George's Methodist Church, Methodist preachers Absalom Jones and Richard Allen, and other black members, left the church and formed the Free African Society.

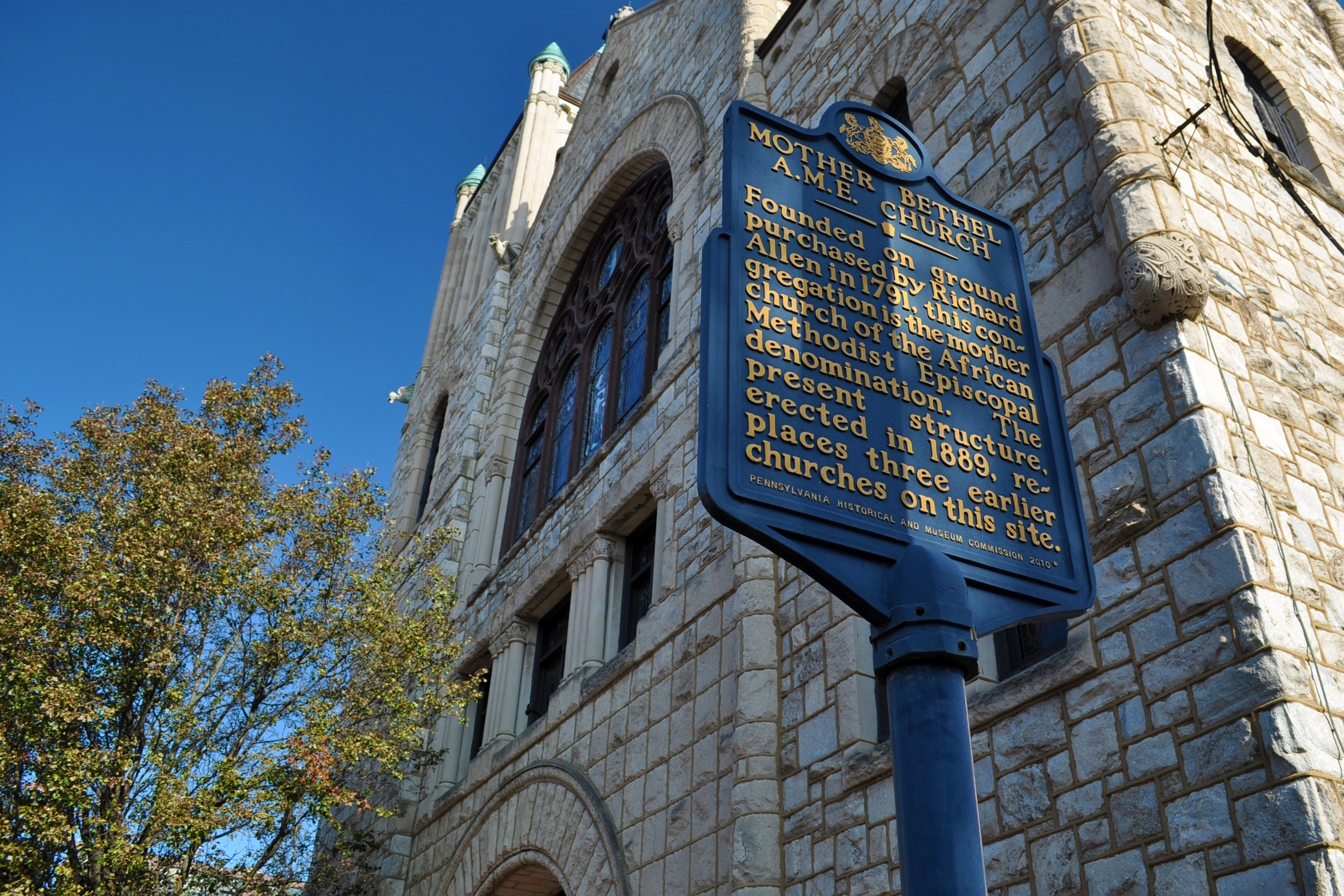
Mother Bethel A.M.E. Church, Philadelphia, Pennsylvania

Richard Allen, a Methodist preacher, wanted to continue with the Methodist tradition. He built a congregation and founded the Bethel African Methodist Episcopal Church. By July 29, 1794, they also had a building ready for their worship. The church adopted the slogan: "To Seek for Ourselves." In recognition of his leadership and preaching, in 1799 Bishop Francis Asbury ordained Allen as a Methodist minister.

Petersburg, Virginia, had two of the oldest black American congregations in the country, both organized before 1800 as a result of the Great Awakening: First Baptist Church (1774) and Gillfield Baptist Church (1797). Each congregation moved from rural areas into Petersburg into their own buildings in the early 19th century. Their two Black Baptist congregations were the first of that denomination in the city and they grew rapidly.

In Savannah, Georgia, a Black Baptist congregation was organized by 1777, by George Liele. A former slave, he had been converted by ordained Baptist minister Matthew Moore. His early preaching was encouraged by his master, Henry Sharp. Sharp, a Baptist deacon and Loyalist, freed Liele before the American Revolutionary War began. Liele had been preaching to slaves on plantations, but made his way to Savannah, where he organized a congregation. After 1782, when Liele left the city with the British, Andrew Bryan led what became known as the First African Baptist Church. By 1800 the church had 700 members, and by 1830 it had grown to more than 2400 members. Soon it generated two new black congregations in the city.

The slaves Peter Durrett and his wife founded the First African Church (now known as First African Baptist Church) in Lexington, Kentucky about 1790. The church's trustees purchased its first property in 1815. The congregation numbered about 290 by the time of Durrett's death in 1823. Before 1850 the church grew to 1,820 members, making it the largest congregation in that state. This was under its second pastor, Rev. London Ferrill, a free black, and occurred as Lexington was expanding rapidly as a city. First African Baptist was admitted to the Elkhorn Baptist Association in 1824, where it came somewhat under oversight of white congregations. In 1856, First African Baptist built a large Italianate church, which was added to the National Register of Historic Places in 1986. By 1861, the congregation numbered 2,223 members, and was the largest congregation in Kentucky.

The First African Baptist Church had its beginnings in 1817 when John Mason Peck and the former enslaved John Berry Meachum began holding church services for African Americans in St. Louis. Meachum founded the First African Baptist Church in 1827. It was the first African American church west of the Mississippi River. Although there were ordinances preventing African Americans from assembling, the congregation grew from 14 people at its founding to 220 people by 1829. Two hundred of the parishioners were slaves, who could only travel to the church and attend services with the permission of their owners.

In 1841, Saint Augustine Catholic Church was established by the Creole community of New Orleans. This church is the oldest black Catholic parish in the United States.

There were also Black Baptist congregations founded in Savannah, Georgia and South Carolina before 1800.

Religious expression and cultural legacy

African American Christianity not only provided spiritual comfort but also became a foundation for cultural creativity, community leadership, and social resistance. The development of spirituals, or “sorrow songs,” expressed both deep religious faith and a yearning for freedom, often using biblical themes such as the Exodus as symbols of liberation. As historian Albert J. Raboteau (2004) explains, these songs “were simultaneously expressions of religious faith and acts of protest against slavery” (p. 262). The Black church also became a powerful institution for organizing social life, offering education, leadership training, and political activism. Many prominent abolitionists and early Black leaders, including Frederick Douglass and Sojourner Truth, drew on the moral authority and rhetorical style of the pulpit. After emancipation, the church continued to anchor African American communities, fostering literacy, collective identity, and social progress that later influenced movements for civil rights.

== Sources ==
- Brooks, Walter Henderson (2000) [1910]. The Silver Bluff Church: A History of Negro Baptist Churches in America (electronic ed.). University of North Carolina at Chapel Hill.
- Butler, Jon; Wacker, Grant; Balmer, Randall (2003). Religion in American Life: A Short History. Oxford University Press. ISBN 978-0-19-983269-9.
- Frost, J. William (1998). "Christianity and Culture in America". In Kee, Howard Clark (ed.). Christianity: A Social and Cultural History. Upper Saddle River, NJ: Prentice Hall. ISBN 978-0-13-578071-8.
- Genovese, Eugene (1974). Roll, Jordan, Roll: The World the Slaves Made.
- Kidd, Thomas S. (2007). The Great Awakening: The Roots of Evangelical Christianity in Colonial America. Yale University Press. ISBN 978-0-300-11887-2.
- Kidd, Thomas S. (2008). The Great Awakening: A Brief History with Documents. Bedford Series in History and Culture. Bedford/ St. Martin's. ISBN 978-0-312-45225-4.
- Lambert, Frank (Winter 2002). "'I Saw the Book Talk': Slave Readings of the First Great Awakening". The Journal of African American History. 87 (1): 12–25. doi:10.1086/JAAHv87n1p12. JSTOR 1562488. S2CID 142221704.
- Raboteau, Albert J. (2004). Slave religion: the "invisible institution" in the antebellum South (Updated ed.). Oxford; New York: Oxford University Press. ISBN 978-0-19-517413-7.
- Smedley, R. C. (1883). History of the Underground Railroad: In Chester and the Neighboring Counties of Pennsylvania. Stackpole Books. p. 106. ISBN 978-0-8117-3189-8.
