= Mary Jenkins =

Mary Jenkins may refer to:

- Mary Jenkins (conspirator) (1823–1865), American woman convicted of taking part in the conspiracy to assassinate Abraham Lincoln
- Mary Jenkins (writer) (born 1944), Welsh-Canadian historical romance novelist

== Fictional characters ==
- Mary Hurley Jenkins, in the US sitcom TV series 227, played by Marla Gibbs

== See also ==
- Mary Jenkins Community Praise House, historic church in South Carolina
- Jenkins (surname)
