= History of African American Christianity =

The History of African American Christianity traces the development of Christian faith and practice among African Americans from the colonial period through the modern era. Beginning in the era of slavery, Christianity was promoted to emphasize obedience but it was adapted by slaves to their own spiritual and communal needs. They blended African traditions with Christian beliefs, creating clandestine "invisible churches" as well as churches attached to the plantations. Biblical narratives of liberation, such as the Book of Exodus, became central to Black religious life, inspiring both spiritual endurance and acts of resistance, including slave rebellions led by preachers like Nat Turner.

As free Black communities grew African Americans established independent congregations and denominations, such as the African Methodist Episcopal Church and the National Baptist Convention. During the Reconstruction era, Black churches became hubs of education, social services, and political activism, maintaining this role through the Civil Rights Movement of the 20th century producing leaders such as Martin Luther King Jr. and Ralph Abernathy.

== Slavery ==
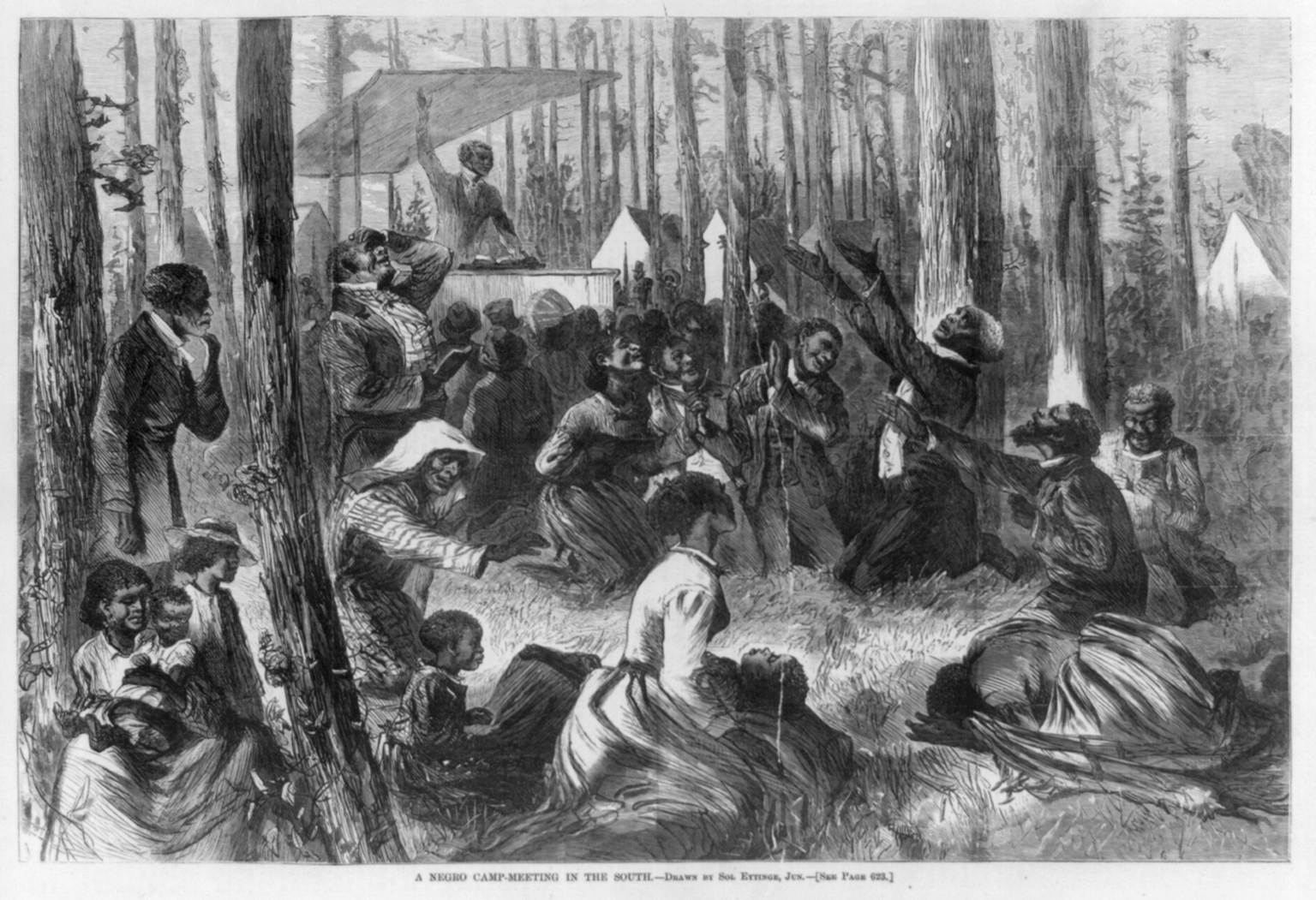
African American churches during slavery were held in secret locations called hush harbors.

While some slaves arrived with prior exposure to Christianity - particularly Catholicism from the Congo - or Islam, almost all first encountered Protestant Christianity in North America. Over time, African American Christianity became a distinctive form of Christian practice that combined evangelical teachings with African religious traditions, creating spiritual and communal spaces under conditions of slavery.

Early efforts at conversion were often led by Anglican missionaries and groups like the Society for the Propagation of the Gospel in Foreign Parts, with limited success. The First Great Awakening in the 18th century and the rise of Methodists and Baptists in the South brought evangelical preaching to slave communities, appealing to them through messages of spiritual equality and deliverance and offering some leadership roles although in some congregations black worshippers could face restrictions and segregation. Nevertheless, clandestine gatherings known as hush harbors and the formation of "invisible churches" allowed slaves to worship freely, and adapt Christian teachings to their own experiences, and incorporate African rhythms and traditions into worship.

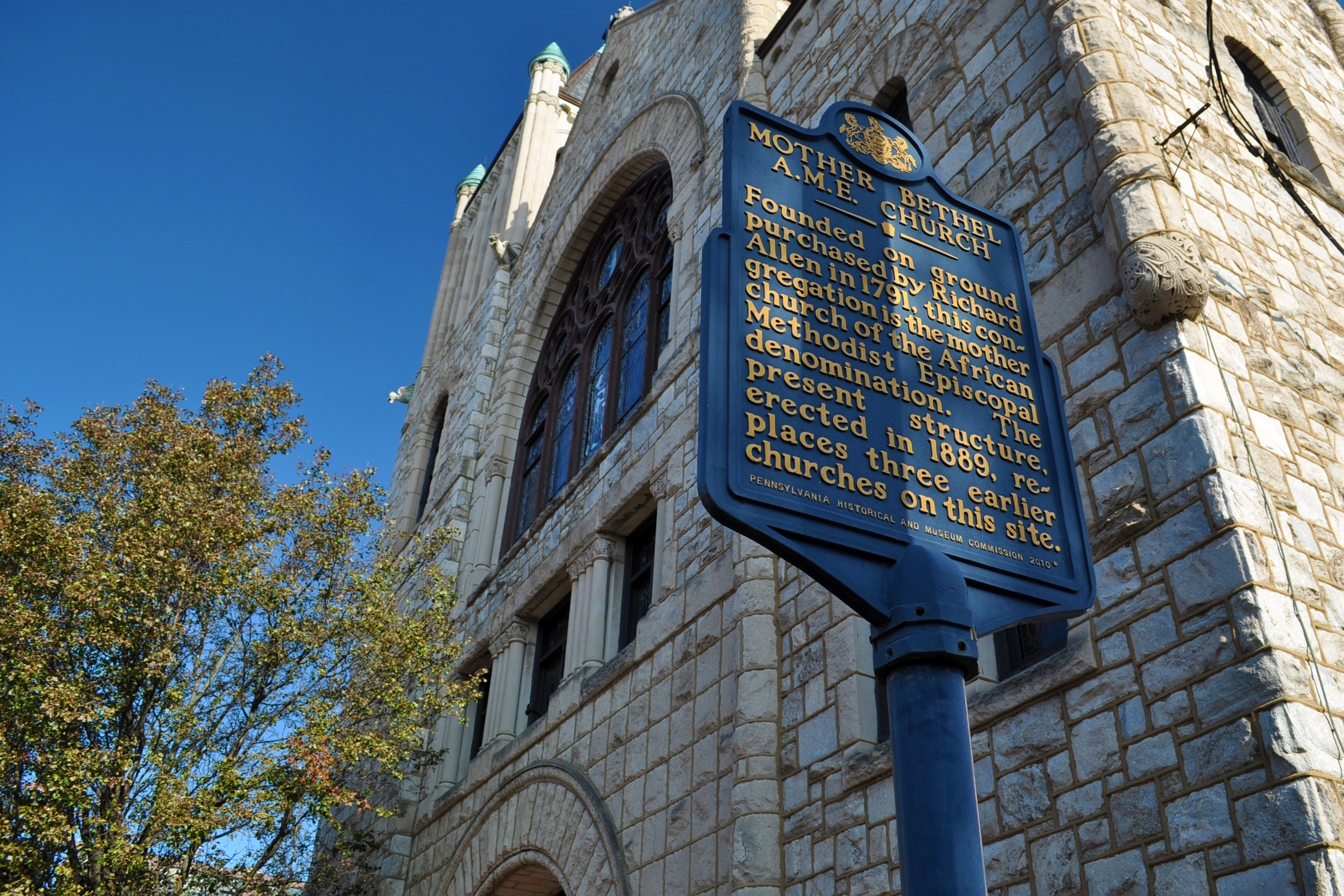
Mother Bethel A.M.E. Church, Philadelphia, Pennsylvania

By the early 19th century, African Americans established independent black churches and congregations, often led by freedmen, such as the African Methodist Episcopal Church founded by Richard Allen in 1816. These churches became centers of resistance and community support, including being active in the underground railroad.

Richard Allen and Absalom Jones, free men from enslaved backgrounds, became the religious and civic heads of the free black community. Jones went on to become America's first African American Episcopal priest. Richard Allen more explicitly founded the Bethel Church, the head church of the African Methodist Episcopal denomination. These church positions allowed both men to become vocal religious and civil authorities in Philadelphia's black community.

Christianity also played a complex role in the ideology of slavery: slaveholders used biblical passages to justify enslavement and enforce obedience, while slave preachers and communities drew upon biblical narratives like the Exodus for inspiration in seeking freedom and equality.

== Reconstruction ==
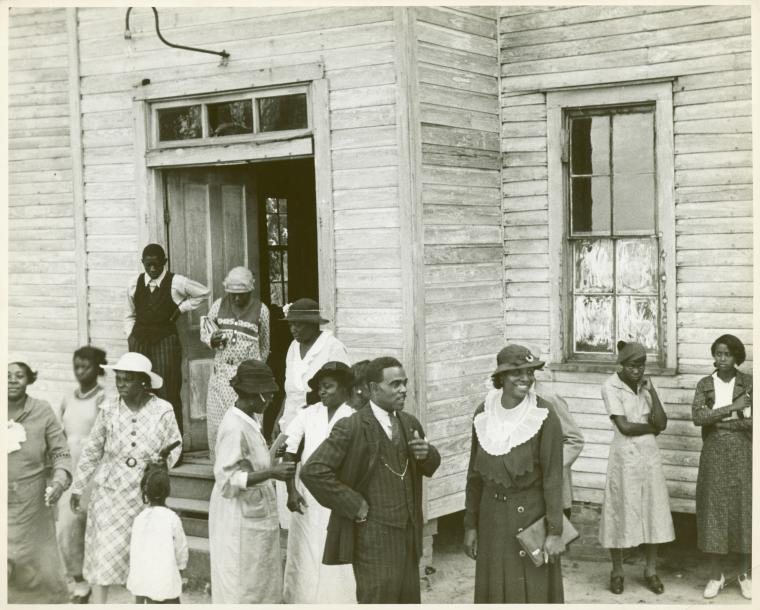
Outside of a black church in Little Rock, Arkansas, 1935

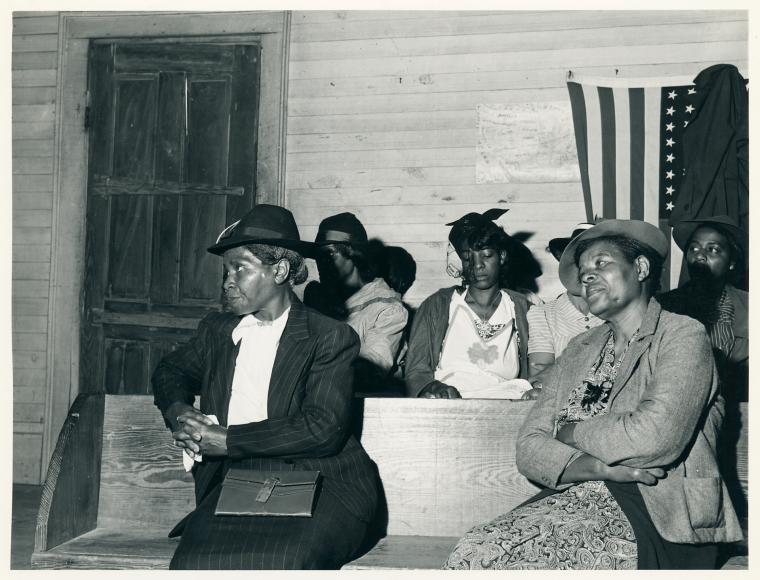
Church goers in Heard County, Georgia, 1941

After emancipation, Northern churches founded by free black people, as well as those of predominantly white denominations, sent missions to the South to minister to newly freed slaves, including to teach them to read and write. For instance, Bishop Daniel Payne of the AME Church returned to Charleston, South Carolina in April 1865 with nine missionaries. He organized committees, associations and teachers to reach freedmen throughout the countryside. In the first year after the war, the African Methodist Episcopal Church gained 50,000 congregants.

By the end of Reconstruction, AME congregations existed from Florida to Texas. Their missioners and preachers had brought more than 250,000 new adherents into the church. While it had a northern base, the church was heavily influenced by this growth in the South and incorporation of many members who had different practices and traditions. Similarly, within the first decade, the independent AME Zion church, founded in New York, also gained tens of thousands of Southern members. These two independent black denominations attracted the most new members in the South.

In 1870 in Jackson, Tennessee, with support from white colleagues of the Methodist Episcopal Church, South, more than 40 black Southern ministers, all freedmen and former slaves, met to establish the Southern-based Colored Methodist Episcopal Church (now Christian Methodist Episcopal Church), founded as an independent branch of Methodism. They took their mostly black congregations with them. They adopted the Methodist doctrine and elected their first two bishops, William H. Miles of Kentucky and Richard H. Vanderhorst of South Carolina. Within three years, from a base of about 40,000, they had grown to 67,000 members, and more than ten times that many in 50 years.

The Church of God, with its beginnings in 1881, held that "interracial worship was a sign of the true Church", with both white people and black people ministering regularly in Church of God congregations, which invited people of all races to worship there. Those who were entirely sanctified testified that they were "saved, sanctified, and prejudice removed." When Church of God ministers, such as Lena Shoffner, visited the camp meetings of other denominations, the rope in the congregation that separated white people and black people was untied "and worshipers of both races approached the altar to pray". Though outsiders would sometimes attack Church of God services and camp meetings for their stand for racial equality, Church of God members were "undeterred even by violence" and "maintained their strong interracial position as the core of their message of the unity of all believers".

At the same time, Black Baptist churches, well-established before the American Civil War, continued to grow and add new congregations. With the rapid growth of black Baptist churches in the South, in 1895 church officials organized a new Baptist association, the National Baptist Convention. This was the unification of three national African American conventions, organized in 1880 and the 1890s. It brought together the areas of mission, education and overall cooperation. Despite founding of new black conventions in the early and later 20th century, this is still one of the largest black religious organizations in the United States. These churches blended elements from underground churches with elements from freely established black churches.

The postwar years were marked by a separatist impulse as black people exercised the right to move and gather beyond white supervision or control. They developed black churches, benevolent societies, fraternal orders and fire companies. In some areas they moved from farms into towns, as in middle Tennessee, or to cities that needed rebuilding, such as Atlanta. Black churches were the focal points of black communities, and their members quickly seceding from white churches demonstrated their desire to manage their own affairs independently of white supervision. It also showed the prior strength of the "invisible church" hidden from white eyes.

Black preachers provided leadership, encouraged education and economic growth, and were often the primary link between the African American and white communities. The black church established and/or maintained the first black schools and encouraged community members to fund these schools and other public services. For most black leaders, the churches always were connected to political goals of advancing the race. There grew to be a tension between black leaders from the North and people in the South who wanted to run their churches and worship in their own way.

Since the male hierarchy denied them opportunities for ordination, middle-class women in the black church asserted themselves in other ways: they organized missionary societies to address social issues. These societies provided job training and reading education, worked for better living conditions, raised money for African missions, wrote religious periodicals, and promoted Victorian ideals of womanhood, respectability, and racial uplift.

== Civil rights movement ==
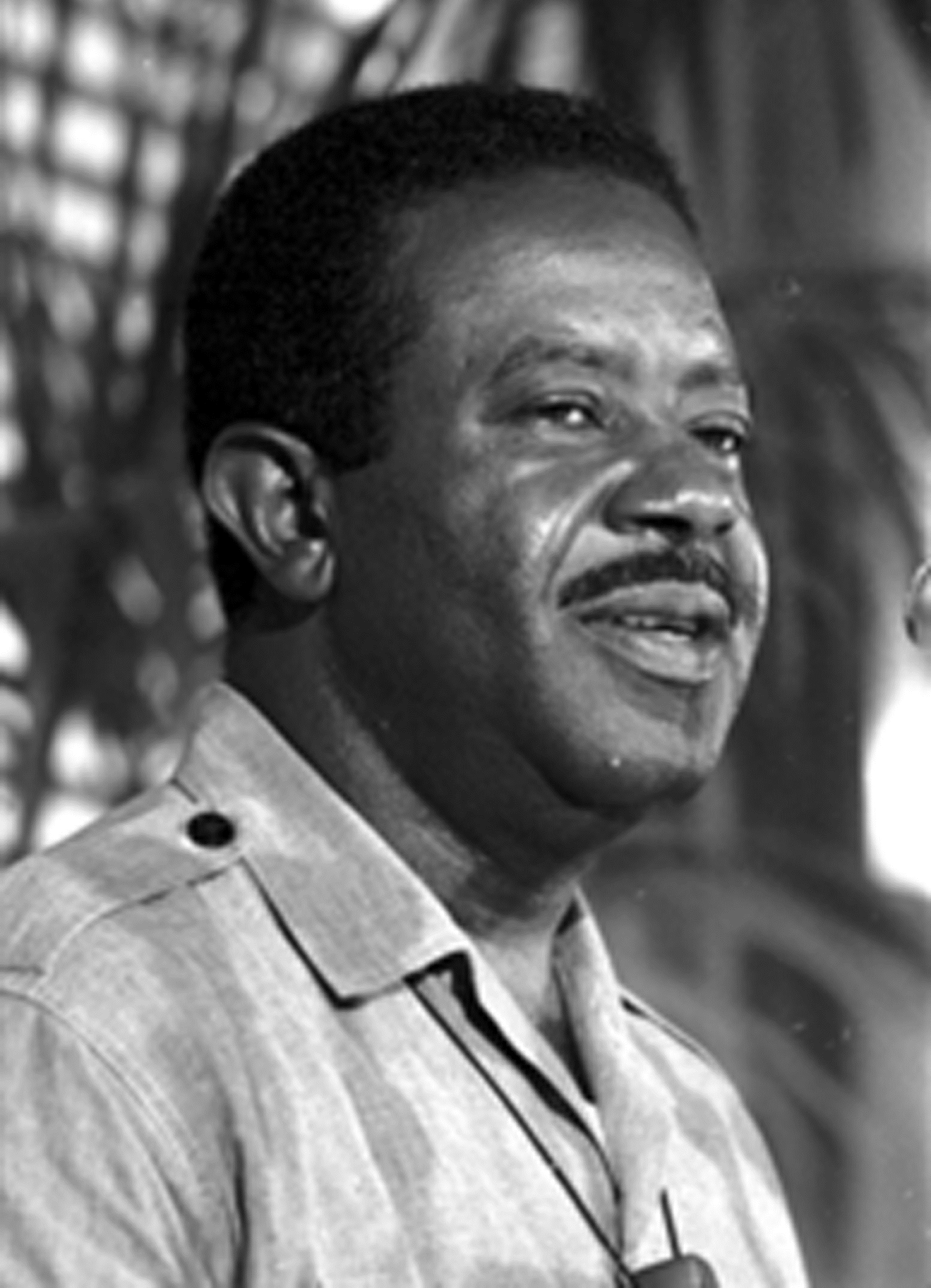
Ralph David Abernathy was a Baptist minister involved in the American Civil Rights Movement.

Black churches held a leadership role in the American civil rights movement. Their history as centers of strength for the black community made them natural leaders in this moral struggle. In addition they had often served as links between the black and white worlds. Notable minister-activists of the 1950s and 1960s included Martin Luther King Jr., Ralph David Abernathy, Bernard Lee, Fred Shuttlesworth, Wyatt Tee Walker, C. T. Vivian, and Fr. Ted Hesburgh, who would later be recruited by President Johnson to help craft the legislation that would later become the 1964 Civil Rights Act. During this movement, many African American Baptists split over using black churches as political centers alongside spiritual centers; this led to the formation of the Progressive National Baptist Convention.

== Black Power movement ==
After the assassination of Dr. King in 1968, by James Earl Ray, African American Catholics began organizing en masse, beginning with the clergy that April. A Black Catholic revolution soon broke out, fostering the integration of the traditions of the larger (Protestant) Black Church into Black Catholic parishes. Soon there were organizations formed for Black religious sisters (1968), permanent deacons, seminarians, and a brand-new National Black Catholic Congress organization in 1987, reviving the late 19th-century iteration of the same. This era saw a massive increase in Black priests, and the first crop of Black bishops and archbishops.

Black Catholics are still in a relatively small number in the United States. The first black American cardinal Wilton Gregory, the archbishop of Washington D.C., attained the cardinal position in 2020. Being a Black Catholic provides a different experience compared to being a Black Protestant. Black protestants are not a minority in the black community. 68% of black protestants claim that they worship with other Black church attendees compared to the just 25% of Black Catholics who report that worship with other black church attendees.
