= Racial segregation of churches in the United States =

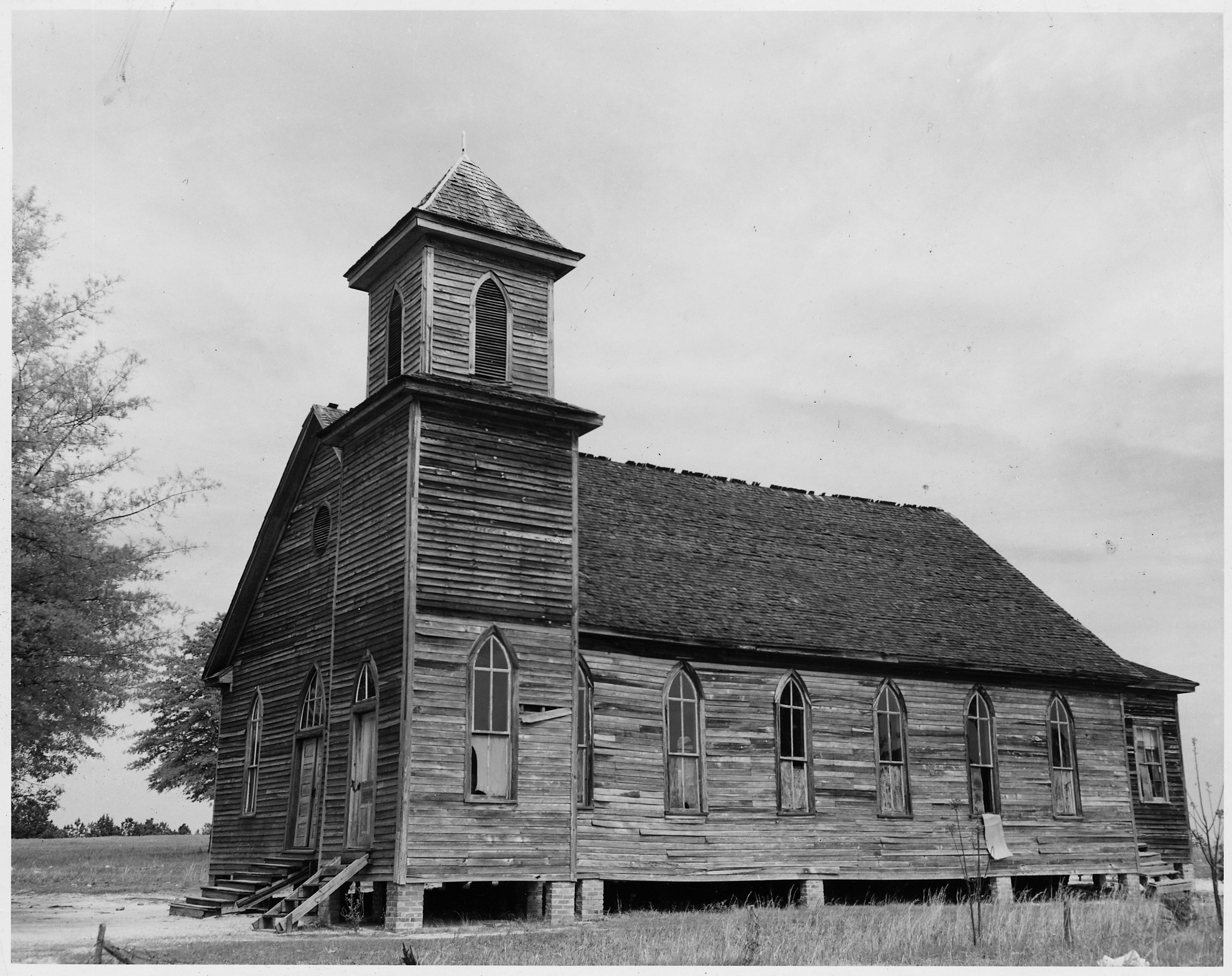
View of an African-American church in a thinly populated area of Newberry County, South Carolina.

Racial segregation of churches in the United States is a pattern of Christian churches maintaining segregated congregations based on race.

Racially segregated churches have existed within the United States since before it became a country, and they lasted through the post-slavery era and well into the modern age.

There are many reasons for the history and the continued prevalence of racial segregation in U.S. churches, including widespread and systemic racism as well as geographic and denominational differences across branches of various religions. This segregation affects society both on an individual level and as a whole, consequently causing increased racism and segregation outside of the church as well. However, segregated black churches have also become a positive space for community issues like civil rights, in addition to offering a respite for black individuals from the racism they face in integrated society.

== History ==
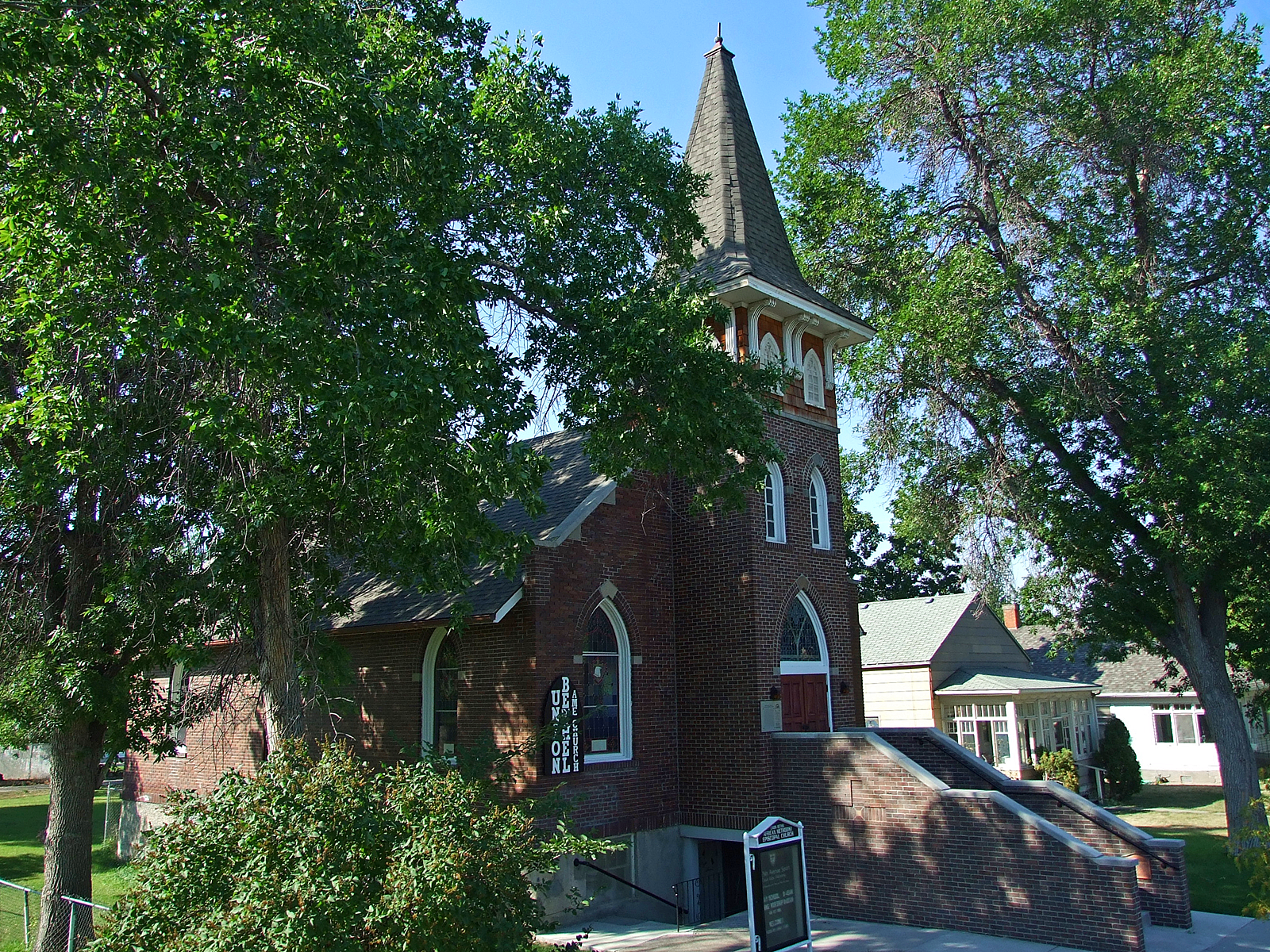
Union Bethel African Methodist Episcopal Church (2012) – Cascade County, Montana

=== Pre-Civil War era ===
Before the American Civil War, many churches in both the Northern and Southern United States were segregated, both socially and legally although the First Great Awakening did result in the conversion of many slaves into mixed congregations. The first black church was founded in 1773 in South Carolina. In the 19th century, both the African Methodist Episcopal Church and the African Methodist Episcopal Zion Church were founded by African Americans, and they were led by African Americans in addition to exercising control over their own properties.

==== Northern states ====
By the 1830s, many Northern white Christians had become abolitionists. Many of them felt that slavery contradicted the ideals that they had fought for in the American Revolutionary War. However, while many Northern Christians began to speak out against slavery, they did not speak out against racism for fear of "miscegenation", since they felt that interracial relationships were unchristian. Due to this fear, church leaders frequently called for the establishment of segregated congregations and resisted initiating black people into the church leadership or designating them as elders.

In addition to the segregation of black people, the spread of Christianity in the Northern States also affected Native Americans in seventeenth-century New England, referred to as Praying Indians. Puritans viewed Praying Indians as inferior and forced them to abandon their culture in favor of the former's concept of civilization. Ministers like John Eliot defended this technique by stating that Native Americans should adopt the mannerisms and customs of English people before earning the privilege of becoming Christian. According to historian Neal Salisbury, John Eliot prompted Native Americans' rapid conversion to Christianity by isolating the Praying Indians into fourteen "praying towns" from the mid-to-late seventeenth century, hence the name. One of Eliot's most successful towns was Natick, Massachusetts, where the missionary considered the Native Americans' rapid conversion to be a transformational change in favor of civilization. These towns were so effective that by 1675, almost one-fourth of the Native Americans had converted to Christianity, though contrary to popular belief, some opted to do so at their own will.

According to James F. Cooper Jr., Associate Professor of History at Oklahoma State University, the Puritans believed that their success in New England depended on "their ability to establish and maintain this scripturally based system of worship". This explains the Puritans' haste in their mission to convert Native Americans to Christianity. Puritans applied church doctrines such as popular consent to their government, although since non-Puritans only qualified as "cultural inferiors", they were only expected to "subject themselves" to the Puritans' supposedly superior form of government.

==== Southern states ====
In the South, church leaders and Christians began to defend slavery by using the Bible and church doctrine. This involved making use of biblical, charitable, evangelistic, social, and political rationalizations, such as the fact that Biblical figures owned slaves and the argument that slavery allowed African Americans to become Christians. Another prominent reason which was used to justify slavery was the belief that Christians should focus on evangelism, stay out of politics, and follow the law. By 1860, one year before the start of the American Civil War, 11% of African Americans were members of Christian churches.

In the 18th century, many white Protestants did not believe that African Americans were fully human, and as a result, they did not believe that African Americans had souls. When this view changed, white Christians began to try to convert slaves to Christianity, although slave owners resisted their conversion because they were afraid of slave revolts. In trying to convert slaves to Christianity, Christian leaders encouraged slavery, as well as any means of punishment that was used against slaves who revolted. Some Christian leaders even said that slavery was beneficial in that it allowed, or oftentimes forced, slaves to become Christians.

=== Reconstruction era ===
After the American Civil War and the emancipation of slaves in the United States, many Northern African American religious groups created missionary church plants in the South, to connect newly freed African Americans with the African-American denominations of the North. By 1870, attendance at the African Methodist Episcopal Church and the Christian Methodist Episcopal Church had grown significantly.

In urban areas after the 1870s, there was a large push towards multi-denominational evangelism with both white and African American congregations. However, while white evangelicals focused on textual interpretation and history, African American groups focused on social injustices and racism.

It was especially during this time that African Americans began forming their own churches, in part because of the unequal treatment they were facing in integrated churches in both the North and the South. Christian theology was often used to justify this split, with the implication that it was God's plan to have people separated by race.

=== Jim Crow era ===
A survey of African American churchgoers which was conducted in 1968 revealed that 94% of African Americans were members of predominantly African American congregations. Of the other 6% who were members of integrated denominations, 99% went to segregated churches. During that time, African American churches did not focus on critiquing or challenging segregation and racism, instead, they focused on the promise of a better life after death.

=== Civil Rights era ===
During the Civil Rights Movement, African American churchgoers used their presence in church to unite people on civil rights issues. This was significantly more successful in the South than in the North, as Southern problems of legal segregation were easier to identify and fix in comparison to problems in the North such as emerging ghettos.

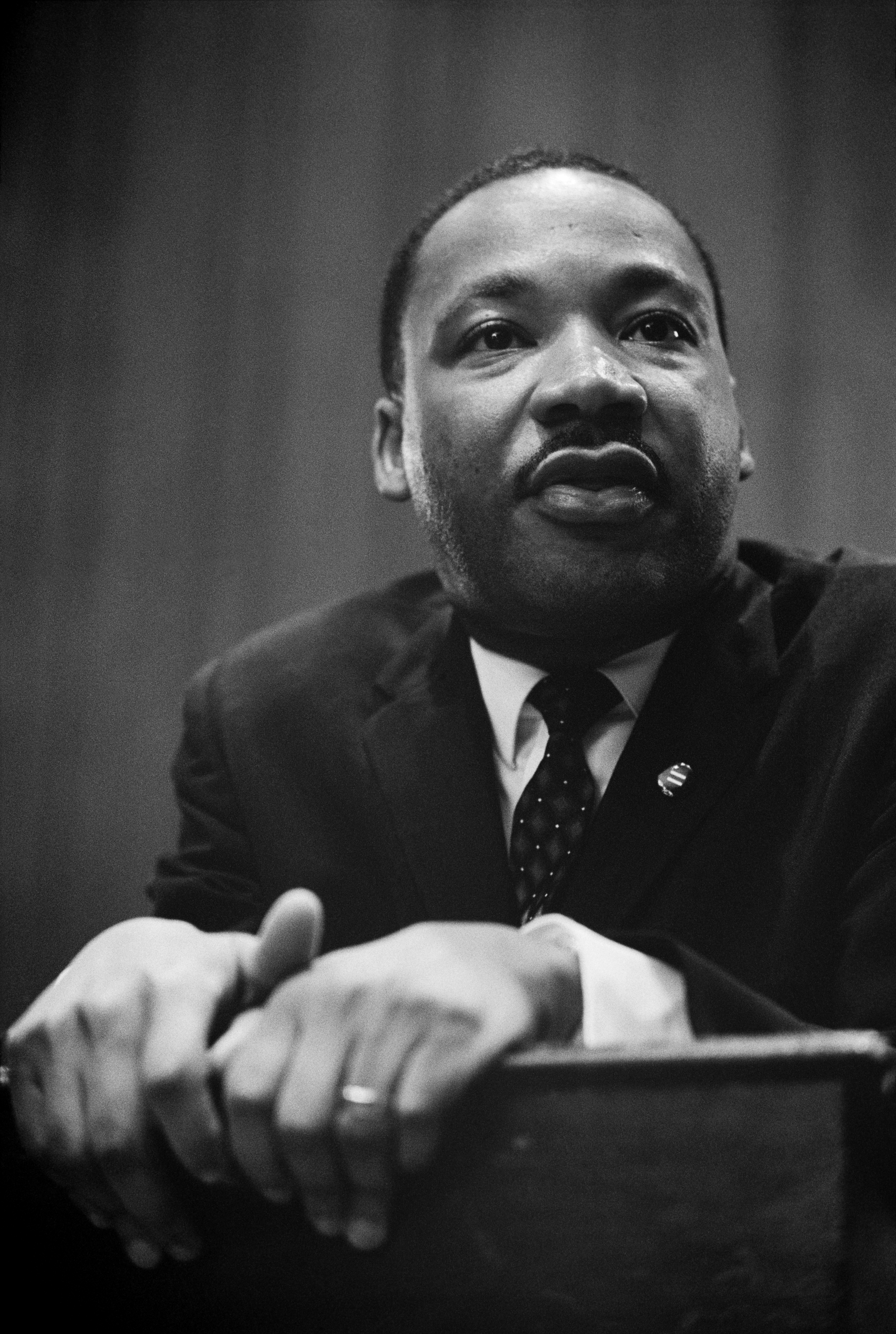
An image of Martin Luther King Jr., a Baptist pastor during the Civil Rights Era.

While at the beginning of the Civil Rights Era there was some push from white Christians to integrate churches, after there was "a white backlash against black progress," the push ended as white Americans were less inclined to push for social segregation. However, many historians have said that religion was an important motivator for people to be in favor of civil rights, because they believed that racism was sinful or unchristian. Sermons influenced the views of congregation members on segregation, which, during this time period, shifted largely from supporting segregation to opposing it. This may have varied widely by region, as Southern pastors were much more racist than their Northern counterparts. Additionally, many evangelical Christians believed that integration and equality may be impossible, as they believed that the world was descending into chaos as a precursor to "the second coming," when Jesus would return to the Earth as described in the Book of Revelation.

During this era, primarily black churches were an important place for social organizing. African-American church members and leaders played a large role in the Civil Rights Movement, which also gave the movement distinct religious undertones. Appealing to the public using religious reasoning and doctrine was incredibly common.

== Variations among denominations ==
=== Nontraditional denominations ===
==== Black Hebrew Israelites ====
The faith of Black Hebrew Israelites is rooted in Judaism. Members believe that they are descendants of the 12 Tribes of Israel. Within the religion, there are some groups that express extremist ideologies. These groups believe that only blacks, Hispanics, and Native Americans will be allowed into heaven and that other Jewish groups are not legitimate.

==== Mormonism ====
The Church of Jesus Christ of Latter-day Saints (LDS Church) is the largest denomination within Mormonism and has a long history of racial exclusion. According to Cassandra L. Clark, one reason why polygamy was a part of the Mormon culture was to promote the growth of the white race. From the mid-1800s until 1978, the LDS Church prevented most men of black African descent from being ordained to the church's lay priesthood, barred black men and women from participating in the ordinances of its temples and opposed interracial marriage. Since black men of African descent could not receive the priesthood, they were excluded from holding leadership roles and performing these rituals.

During the first century of its existence, the LDS Church discouraged social interaction with blacks and encouraged racial segregation. Joseph Smith, who is considered a prophet in the LDS Church, supported segregation, stating, "I would confine them [black people] by strict law to their own species". Other LDS Church leaders, such as David O. McKay, J. Reuben Clark, Henry D. Moyle, Ezra Taft Benson, Joseph Fielding Smith, Harold B. Lee, and Mark E. Petersen were leading proponents of segregation. The First Presidency under George Albert Smith sent a letter on May 5, 1947, stating that "social intercourse between the Whites and the Negroes should certainly not be encouraged because of leading to intermarriage, which the Lord has forbidden." In 1954, apostle Mark E. Petersen taught that segregation was inspired by God, arguing that "what God hath separated, let not man bring together again". The church also advocated for segregation laws and enforced segregation in its facilities. Blacks were prohibited from performing in the Salt Lake Tabernacle.

During the years, different black families were either told by church leadership not to attend church or chose not to attend church after white members complained. The church began considering segregated congregations, and sent missionaries to southern United States to establish segregated congregations.

Despite the change in 1978, the LDS Church still has a white majority. According to the Pew Research Center, 85% of Mormons are white, 8% are Latino, and less than 1% are black.

=== Protestantism ===
In 2014, Protestants made up over 46 percent of the U.S. population. Racial minorities made up 24 percent of evangelical Protestants and 14 percent of mainline Protestants. Major branches of Protestantism include, but are not limited to, Calvinists, Baptists, Methodists, and Pentecostals.

==== Calvinism ====
Calvinism is based on the theological argument of John Calvin and began in Europe in the 16th century. Calvinism was first practiced in America by English-speaking colonies. Calvinists believe in the sole authority of the Bible, of Christ alone, and in faith and morals, and object to the Catholic Church through their "five solae", or five core theological beliefs. Presbyterian and Reformed churches are both considered Calvinist in doctrine. These two denominations make up approximately 7% of all Protestants.

According to the Pew Research Center, approximately 88% of the members of the Presbyterian Church (USA) are white, 5% are black, 3% are Asian, and 4% are Latino. The Presbyterian Church in America is more diverse, with 80% of its members being white, 6% being black, 3% being Asian, and 5% identifying as mixed or another race.

==== Lutheranism ====
Lutheranism originated through Martin Luther's opposition to teachings and practices of the Catholic Church. A core belief of the Lutheran Church is sola fide, that it is on the basis of their faith that believers are forgiven their transgressions of the law of God, rather than on the basis of good works which they have done. Lutheranism began in the United States when Lutheran immigrants from Europe settled in the "middle colonies." Lutheranism later expanded to Midwestern America.

The Lutheran Church was actively involved in protesting segregation during the Civil Rights Movement. Robert Graetz, a white pastor of a majority African American Lutheran Church during the Civil Rights Movement, was particularly involved. Graetz protested against the arrest of Rosa Parks and advocated for integrated church services. By 1964, the American Lutheran Church had banned segregation within congregations.

Unlike many other Protestant traditions, there is not a Black church organization or denomination that is specifically Lutheran. The two major Lutheran denominations, the Evangelical Lutheran Church in America (ELCA) and the Lutheran Church–Missouri Synod (LCMS), are predominantly white. They have similar compositions, with the ELCA being 96% white and 2% black and the LCMS being 95% white, 2% black, and 2% other.

==== Pentecostalism ====
Pentecostalism began in the United States in the early 20th century, growing out of the Holiness movement. Pentecostalism and Holiness were especially attractive to African Americans from the South because the focus on personal religious experiences rather than the focus on texts and religious doctrines was similar to the way in which Christianity was practiced during the era of slavery. Pentecostalism is marked by a charismatic approach to Christianity, and while modern Pentecostalism has become more segregated, it has a history of being very integrated even while segregation remained the norm in certain other denominations. The early 20th century Evangelist Maria Woodworth-Etter warned Southern Congregations that she would not preach in segregated services when she visited them. Another important charismatic figure was Charles Finney, who ran popular church revivals and preached abolitionist views as he toured the South.

Pentecostalism also underwent a resurgence within the United States in the 1970s, and it was very integrated at this time. Some partly attribute the diversity which existed within the charismatic movement to the Civil Rights Movement of the prior decade.

There are many different Pentecostal churches in America. The Church of God in Christ is a predominantly black denomination, with 84% of their members being black, 5% being white, and 8% being Latino. Other Pentecostal churches, such as Assemblies of God and the Church of God (Cleveland, Tennessee), are fairly racially diverse. Their white memberships are 66% and 65% respectively.

==== Baptists ====
Baptists first originated in Holland during the early 17th century. Baptists came to the Southern United States to preach the gospel to white people and African Americans during the Revolutionary War. The Baptist message was largely focused on individual experience and salvation. At the beginning of the Baptist movement, many congregations were integrated. Despite this, African American members of the church often sat in separate areas and had little say in church affairs. African Americans could be leaders in the church, but in separate quarters consisting only of their own race. After the Civil War, African Americans started their own churches, an idea that was supported by both white and black southerners.

Additionally, Northern Baptists morally objected to slavery more than Southern Baptists, who regarded slavery as a fact of life. However, both were worried about the divide that these opposite views on slavery could cause among congregations and leaders.

Today, Baptists make up the largest African American denominational group in the United States. However, there are vast differences in racial makeup of different types of Baptist Churches. According to the Pew Research Center, the National Baptist Convention is currently considered the least racially diverse church in America, with 99% of its members being black. The American Baptist Church is the most racially diverse of the three major Baptist churches in America. Its members are 73% white, 10% black, and 11% Latino. The Southern Baptist Convention falls in between the two other major Baptist churches in regards to racial diversity, with 85% of its members being white, 6% being black, and 3% being Latino.

==== Methodism ====
Methodism originated in England during the early 18th century. Founder John Wesley did not originally intend to found a new denomination, but rather reform the Church of England. Methodism was brought to America by Irish immigrants during the late 18th century.

In the antebellum North, many Methodists were very supportive of converting African Americans. John Wesley was invested in the abolition of slavery, and he visited Georgia to proselytize to slaves who appreciated his "plain doctrine and good discipline." At the same time, however, Methodist religious leaders in Philadelphia's St. George church forced African Americans out of their congregation.

In the antebellum South, Methodism was largely connected to slave owning. All of the bishops within the Methodist Episcopal Church were slave owners from 1846 until slavery was abolished, and many members of the church were slave owners as well.

Methodists comprised two of the largest postbellum Southern churches the African Methodist Episcopal church and the African Methodist Episcopal Zion church. African American Methodists from the North saw it as their duty both to evangelize to and educate African Americans in the South.

Currently, the two major Methodist churches in America are the African Methodist Episcopal Church and the United Methodist Church. There is a clear racial divide between the two groups. The African Methodist Episcopal Church consists of 94% black Americans and 2% white Americans. The United Methodist Church's members, on the other hand, are 94% white and less than 1% black.

==== Non-denominational ====
Non-denominational churches originated during the mid-20th century in America. According to Michael De Groote of Deseret News, very few non-denominational churches (about 5%) reflect practices of historically Black churches.

Thousands of non-denominational, Protestant congregations have emerged in recent decades. Many of these in large metropolitan areas have highly integrated, multi-racial congregations and staff, regardless of their location in the North or the South. Some of the largest churches in the country, whose services are regularly broadcast on national television networks, belong to this category.

According to the Pew Research Center, "nothing in particular" denominations are relatively diverse, with 64% of their members being white, 12% being black, 15% being Latino, 5% being Asian, and 5% being mixed or other.

==== Evangelicalism ====
Evangelicalism is a type of Christianity that has branches within many Protestant denominations including Baptist, Methodism, and Presbyterianism. According to historian Christine Leigh Heyrman, evangelicalism was introduced to the South by missionaries in the 1740s. Evangelical denominations believe in an admittance of sin, and letting God into their hearts to save them from this inherent sin. They aim to share these beliefs with others, which is called evangelizing, hence the name. After it was introduced to the South, evangelicalism began to spread in America among white southerners in the 1830s.

Heyrman says that prior to the Civil War, evangelical churches did not denounce slavery. Many church members were slaveholders. The Methodist Episcopal Church attempted to protest slavery through membership restrictions and preaching; however, there was significant pushback, and the only restrictions that were upheld were those constituting that members could not “engage in the buying or selling of slaves with the intention of keeping them in bondage.” This slave-holding culture within the evangelical churches often discouraged less wealthy southerners from joining the church.

Despite these views on slavery, early evangelists supported black membership in the church. In fact, according to historian David Edwin Harrell, most black people were members of evangelical churches, and they both contributed to and learned from white churches. Heyrman describes how interracial services occurred; however, there were often complaints or racist comments made by white members. Many white evangelicals, including minister John Leland, questioned whether black Christians were able to interpret religion in the same way that white people could due to their high rate of illiteracy. Harrell states that other southern evangelicals were extremely focused on spreading Christianity to others, including "cleansing society as well as saving individual souls." According to professors Michael O. Emerson and Christian Smith, though evangelicals can belong to any racial or ethnic group, almost "90 percent of Americans who call themselves evangelicals are white" today.

Racial integration of services has only happened recently within evangelical churches. Philip Yang and Starlita Smith state that some evangelical churches held separate church services for black and white members with significant support from white members until the 1990s. Yang and Smith also discuss how integration in evangelical churches likely remained unsupported for a long period of time due to the high number of conservative church members—according to a Pew Research Study, 38 percent of evangelicals identify as conservative. This is the highest percentage of conservatives in any branch of religion included in the study, which consisted of Christian, non-Christian, and other unaffiliated groups.

=== Catholicism ===
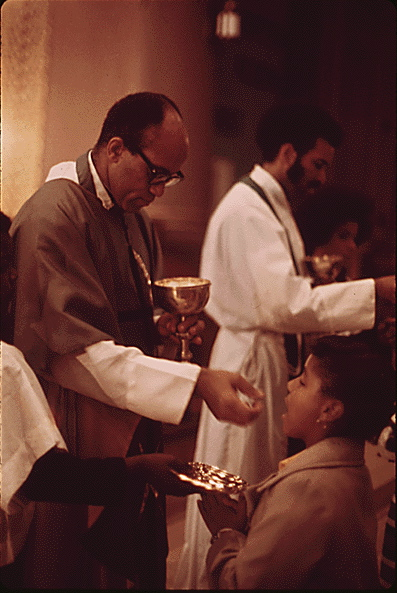
George H. Clements giving Holy Communion, Chicago, 1973.

Catholicism has generally been less segregated than other denominations. In his journal article "Racial Segregation in American Churches and Its Implications for School Vouchers", Robert K. Vischer says the Catholic Church did not have an obvious racial split, as did other denominations. However, "the vast majority of Catholic institutions and religious orders" in the United States did exclude black Catholics until the twentieth century, though as historian Shannen Dee Williams states, "Black history is Catholic history."

In 1940 only 63.7% of African American Catholics attended segregated churches, as compared to 94% of African American Protestants. Vischer says that the smaller rates of segregation may be due in part to the fact that Catholic churches are more religiously focused in comparison to Protestant churches, which are more socially focused. Theologically, Catholic churches also emphasize unity among races.

In 1984 American bishops disseminated a letter calling for even further inclusion of racial and ethnic minorities into Catholic churches. According to the Pew Research Center, as of 2014, about 59% of Catholics are white. The majority of other major Christian denominations have a much higher percentage of white members.

The Catholic Church continues to face criticism due to biases against black converts. In his article "Black Catholic Conversion and the Burden of Black Religion", Matthew Cressler says that scholars have often questioned why African-Americans convert to Catholicism. Two explanations were popular in the 1970s. The first, according to black priest Lawrence Lucas, was that Catholicism is a white religion and attracts African-Americans due to their “subconscious desire to be white.” The second reason, offered by sociologists, was that Catholicism provides socioeconomic mobility for black Americans. However, black converts themselves said they converted because of a variety of reasons, many unrelated to those listed above.

According to Cressler, between 1940 and 1975, the number of African-American Catholics has increased by 208%. In contrast, Stephen J Ochs notes that between 1970 and 1975, up to a fifth of African-American Catholics lapsed (alongside a larger exodus of black and other Catholics from the clergy, religious orders, and the pews during the same period).

According to Williams, "people of Black African descent constitute approximately one-fourth, or 300 million, of the world's 1.2 billion Catholics.".

== Implications ==
=== Continued societal segregation ===
One effect of segregation in churches may be continued segregation in other parts of U.S. society. As religious segregation furthers in-group homogeneity, it makes the racial divisions throughout all of society even more pronounced.

Another example of religious segregation causing greater society wide segregation can be seen in private schools. When parents choose to send their children to private schools, they are often religious institutions, and because religious institutions are often racially segregated, this means that students are in turn in racially segregated classrooms. There is some concern that an increase in the use of school vouchers in the United States will also then increase the number of students in segregated schools, as school vouchers are generally used to send children to private religious institutions.

=== White racism ===
A 1999 study of "European-Americans' racial attitudes" showed that among these white churchgoers, those who go to segregated or primarily white churches are more likely to exhibit racist behaviors or to have prejudiced ideas about African Americans. Those who attend integrated churches are about equal in racial attitudes to those who do not attend church at all, but those who attend racially segregated churches are more likely to be both covertly and overtly racist than either group. It is difficult to posit whether this intolerance is caused by attending a segregated church, or if those who hold prejudiced views are more likely to seek out a segregated church.

In a study of white Protestant Christians from the 1990s, it was found that those who had more contact with African Americans, especially a personal or more intimate relationship, were more likely to believe in structural inequality and racial discrimination than their counterparts with few or no African American contacts, who more so blamed African Americans for "not working hard enough," as being the cause of racial inequality.

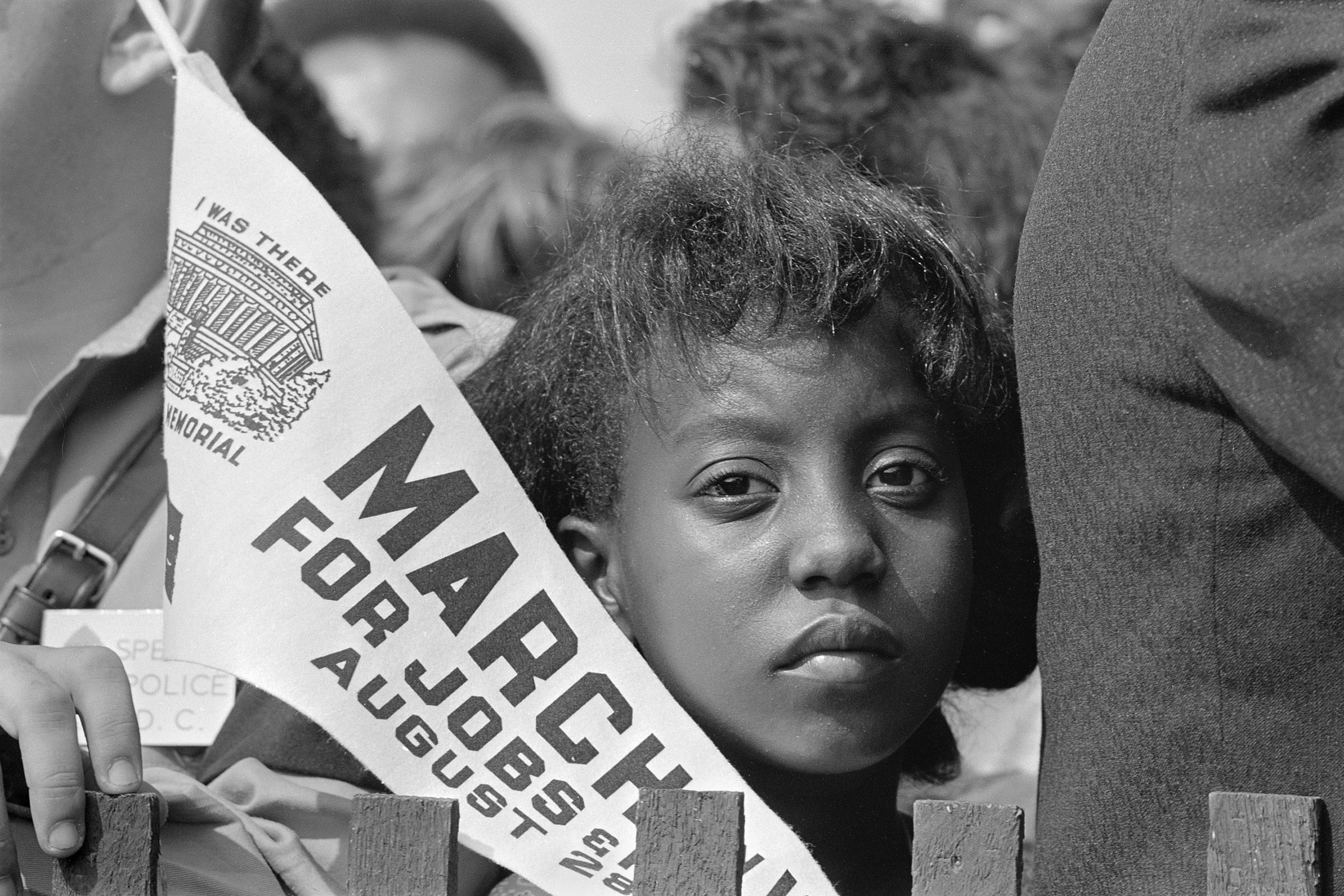
A young woman holds a banner at the Civil Rights March on Washington, D.C., on August 28, 1963.

=== Organized community-wide movements ===
Many have said that primarily black churches were integral to the civil rights movement and they also served as popular gathering places because information about boycotts and the ideas of activists were frequently dispensed from them. Black churches continue to be important for bonding and community building within African American communities, as well as places where African Americans are safe and free to grieve about the racism which they face. Liturgical rituals are important for the purposes of activism and community organizing within African American communities, whether or not the causes of them are expressly religious.

Women in black churches also organized for rights and representation for women and African Americans. Women's African American church groups fought for women's suffrage, prohibition, and participated in the Civil Rights Movement. Despite all of their work, both inside and outside churches, very few African American women hold leadership positions in churches, even in segregated churches.

== The 21st century ==
=== Black Lives Matter ===
The Black Lives Matter movement has prompted responses from many churches in the United States. According to Mark Oppenheimer, the United Church of Christ, the Presbyterian Church (U.S.A.), and the American Baptist Church have spoken out in support of the movement; however, more conservative denominations have been more hesitant to do so. Oppenheimer says that many evangelical denominations are supportive of conservative political candidates, due to their positions on other issues, and that the liberal association of the Black Lives Matter movement makes them hesitant to support it.

Catholic leaders in particular have not come to a consensus on the Black Lives Matter movement. Shannen Dee Williams describes how Catholic leaders were initially reluctant to endorse the movement. She finds this unsurprising, considering the Catholic Church has yet to confront many issues from its past regarding racism. Both Bill Donohue, the President of the Catholic League, and Thomas Anthony Daly, a prelate of the Catholic Church, have publicly condemned the movement. During the George Floyd protests in June 2020, Pope Francis spoke out against what he described as ongoing racism in the United States.

=== Racially-motivated violence ===
One way in which racism has manifested itself in churches is through the commission of violent attacks. One of the most notable church shootings took place on June 17, 2015, in Charleston, South Carolina, by a 21-year old white supremacist. The Charleston shooting resulted in the murder of nine African Americans after seventy rounds were fired at the Emanuel African Methodist Episcopal Church, a primarily black church. According to scholars Kevin Keenan and Anthony Greene, the place where an attack is targeted is instrumental in causing fear, implying that the shooter's choice to target one of the oldest black churches in the United States was intended for maximum effect. For instance, the town and the church's community were deeply impacted as they mourned the lives they had lost, including Rev. Clementa C. Pinckney, an activist, politician, and the church's pastor. The shooting also incited protests throughout Charleston. The Charleston shooting was one of multiple attacks from white supremacists that took place in the following years. In fact, according to the Center for Strategic and International Studies, white supremacists were behind 67 percent of the 61 attacks that took place in the United States during the first eight months of 2020.

Another attack against African-American churches occurred during the spring of 2019. Holden Matthews burned three black churches in Louisiana to the ground over the course of ten days. According to the United States Department of Justice, Matthews pleaded guilty to all of the related charges: three violations of the Church Arson Prevention Act and one violation of "using fire to commit a federal felony." Matthews was sentenced to 25 years in federal prison and owes over $2 million in total to the three churches he destroyed.

=== Acknowledging the existence of racial divides ===
Church leaders are beginning to acknowledge the existence of racial divides within churches. In December 2018, the Southern Baptist Theological Seminary released a report addressing their role in perpetuating racism in the Baptist church, specifically in the South. The report, which followed the Southern Baptist Convention’s 1995 public apology to African Americans for their participation in systemic racism, documented the specific instances when racism played a role in the denomination's rise.

Though these divides remain prominent, they are beginning to reduce as congregations become more racially integrated. According to the 2012 National Congregations Study, the Pew Research Center found that almost all churchgoers attend services where the vast majority of individuals fall into one racial or ethnic group. However, in the past two decades, increased numbers of individuals from other racial groups have joined predominantly white congregations, allowing for more diversity in congregations across the United States. These multiracial churches have continued to attract more people searching for inclusive religious experiences. A study by sociologists Mark Chaves, Michael Emerson, and Kevin Dougherty found that the percentage of multiracial churches in the U.S. grew from 6 percent to 16 percent in 1998 and 2019, respectively. Overall, this does not guarantee that the churches in question consist of increasingly diverse congregations. Instead, the percentage of African American churchgoers slightly increased while the percentage of Hispanic churchgoers decreased slightly.

== See also ==
- African-American culture
- African-American history
- Black Lives Matter movement in popular culture
- Christianity in the United States
- History of Christianity in the United States
- Civil rights movement in popular culture
- Freedom of religion in the United States
- List of attacks against African-American churches
- List of changes made due to the George Floyd protests
- List of George Floyd protests in the United States
- Post–civil rights era in African-American history
- 2020–2023 United States racial unrest
- Racism against African Americans
- Racism in the United States
- Religion in the United States
- History of religion in the United States
- Religion of black Americans
- Religious discrimination in the United States
