= Invisible churches =

Christian churches in US slave community

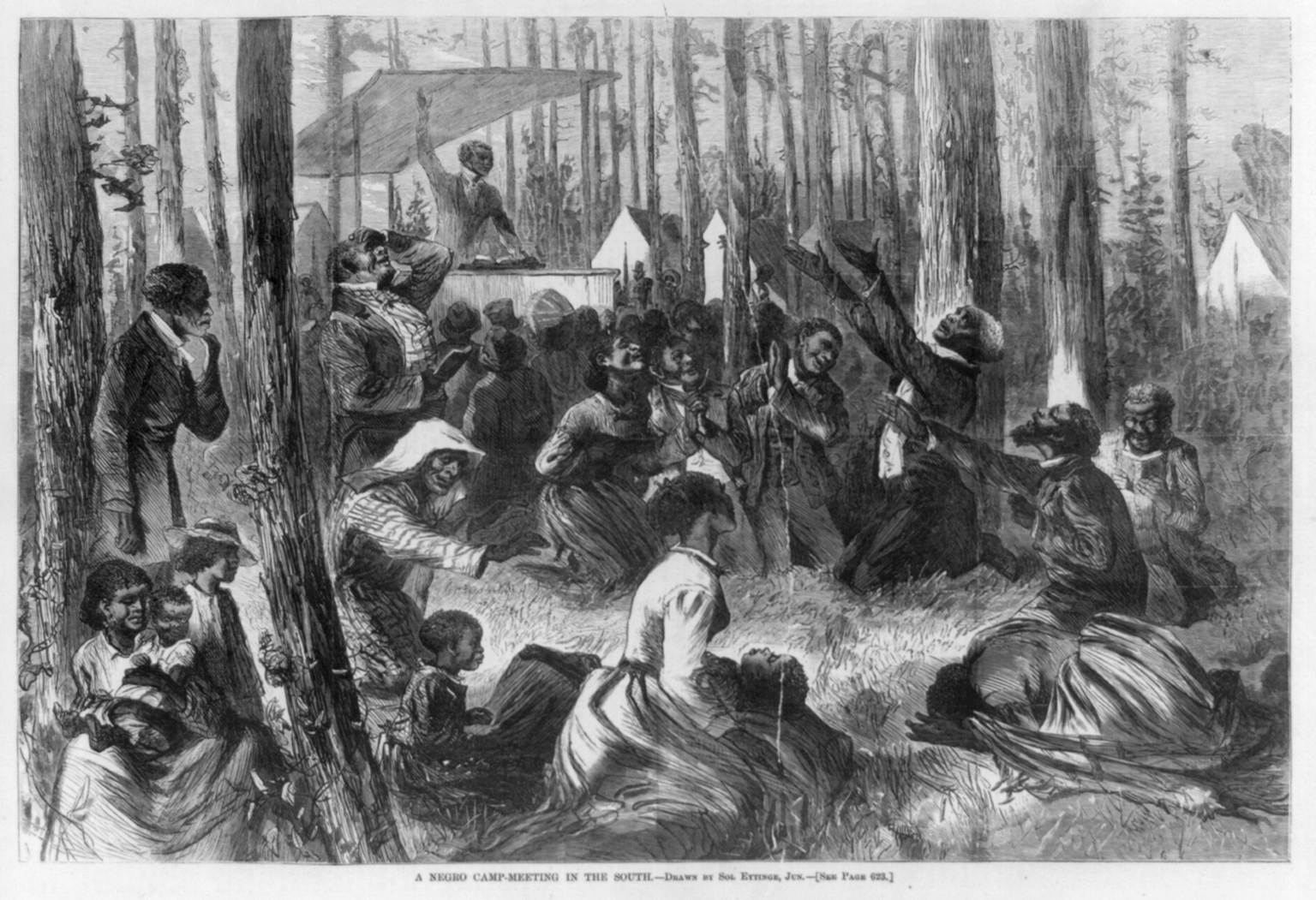
Invisible churches during slavery were held in secret locations called hush harbors.

Invisible churches among enslaved African Americans in the United States were informal Christian groups where enslaved people listened to preachers that they chose without their slaveholder's knowledge. The Invisible churches taught a different message from white-controlled churches and did not emphasize obedience to slave masters. Some slaves could not contact invisible churches and others did not agree with an invisible church's message but many slaves were comforted by the invisible churches.

== History ==
Invisible churches were a branch of Christian churches in the slave community in the colonial history of the United States and antebellum period where enslaved African Americans secretly practiced their own version of Christianity. Inside invisible churches, enslaved and free African Americans practiced Hoodoo. Hoodoo is a spiritual tradition defined by scholars as a folk religion was created by enslaved African Americans during slavery in colonial America for their protection against their enslavers. The practice combines influences from West and Central Africa that was synchronized with Christianity. Scholars call the practice of Hoodoo in Black churches as the invisible institution, because enslaved people concealed their culture and beliefs within the Christian religion. "This phrase [invisible institution] was first used by E Franklin Frazier in [his book] The Negro Church in America to describe the spirituality on slave plantations that was primarily out of view of the mainstream American religious consciousness." European slave traders forbid enslaved and free Black people from practicing their traditional African religions, so they hid many of the practices inside invisible churches. White American slaveholders passed slave codes that prohibited large gatherings of enslaved and free Black people. Slaveholders experienced how slave religion ignited slave revolts among enslaved and free people, and some leaders of slave insurrections were black ministers or conjure doctors. The Code Noir in French colonial Louisiana, prohibited and made it illegal for enslaved Africans to practice their traditional religions. Article III in the Code Noir states: "We forbid any public exercise of any religion other than Catholic." The Code Noir and other slave laws resulted in enslaved and free African Americans to conduct their spiritual practices in invisible churches.

The public churches formed often with controversy within and outside the communities. The 'invisible institution' existed often as a forbidden aspect; slaves might be members of both the independent black church groups or congregations that were racially mixed (Raboteau mentions that some such congregations might have far more slaves than masters in attendance), but also participate in worship gatherings at night in secret locations, risking severe punishment to do so.

=== Plantation churches ===
Hoodoo and Voodoo practices were hidden in Invisible churches during slavery for enslaved and free Black people to protect themselves.

Scholars also call invisible churches "plantation churches" because they started during the time of slavery on plantations. Many of these churches were not in buildings but in the woods and were called brush arbors or hush harbors because enslaved and free people had to hush or quiet their church services in nature. Enslaved people suffered punishments if they were caught in a hush harbor meeting. Slaveholders were confident that they would compare treatment, working conditions, and punishments, leaving them worried about revolts and riots. African American churches taught that all people were equal in God's eyes. Instead the African American church focused on the message of equality and hopes for a better future. African-American spirituals (Negro Spirituals) were created in invisible and non-invisible Black churches. The hymns melody and rhythms sounded similar to songs heard in West Africa. Enslaved and free people created their own words and tunes. Their songs mentioned the hardships of slavery, and the hope of freedom from bondage. Spirituals during slavery are called Slave Shout Songs. These shout songs are sung today by Gullah Geechee people and other African-Americans in churches and praise houses. During slavery, these slave shout songs were coded messages that spoke of escape from slavery on the Underground Railroad. The songs were sung by enslaved African-American people in the fields on slave plantations to send coded messages to other slaves. When slaveholders heard their slaves singing in the fields, they did not know they were communicating messages of escape. The slave shout song, Walk, Believer, Walk, Daniel, discusses Daniel, a Biblical figure, in the song taking flight. This message of flight in the song is about escape from slavery. Harriet Tubman sung coded messages to her mother and other enslaved people in the field to let them know she was escaping on the Underground Railroad. Tubman sang: "I'm sorry I'm going to leave you, farewell, oh farewell; But I'll meet you in the morning, farewell, oh farewell, I'll meet you in the morning, I'm bound for the promised land, On the other side of Jordan, Bound for the Promised Land."

Inside slave community churches, "The message of the Invisible Church was, however articulated, God wants you free!" The spiritual practices inside plantation churches (invisible churches) were African based. Enslaved and free African-Americans practiced the ring shout, spirit possession, ecstatic forms of worship, and Hoodoo. African-American root workers and conjurers identified as Christian and blended Hoodoo with Christianity. To conjure healing, spirits, and protection scriptures from the Bible and prayer was used alongside roots, herbs, and animal parts. William Edward Burghardt Du Bois (W. E. B. Du Bois) studied African-American churches in the early twentieth century. Du Bois asserts that the early years of the Black church during slavery on plantations was influenced by Voodooism.

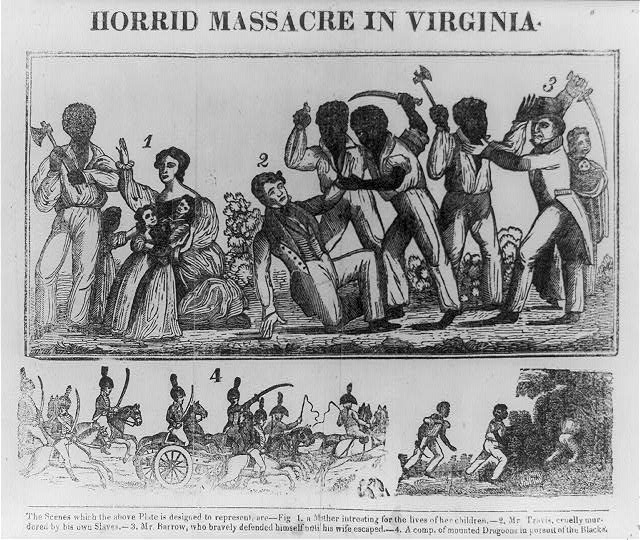
Nat Turner's slave revolt - Slave revolts and slave escapes were planned in invisible churches.

Historians assert that "invisible churches" were where Nat Turner planned his slave revolt in Virginia in 1831. Other slave revolts were planned in Invisible churches. Enslaved African Americans discussed escape from slavery on the Underground Railroad and planned slave revolts inside the invisible church. This practice among the enslaved population created a Hoodoo Christian church or Hoodoonized version of Christianity on slave plantations, where enslaved Africans escaped into the woods at night and practiced a blend of African spirituality with Christianity inside invisible churches. Hoodoo countered European American Christianity as enslaved African Americans reinterpreted Christianity to fit their situation in America as enslaved people. For example, God was seen as powerful and his power can help free enslaved people. This created an "invisible institution" on slave plantations as enslaved Africans practiced the ring shout, spirit possession, and healing rituals to receive messages from spirit about freedom. These practices were done in secret away from slaveholders. This was done in the Hoodoo church among the enslaved. Nat Turner had visions and omens which he interpreted came from spirit, and that spirit told him to start a rebellion to free enslaved people through armed resistance. Turner combined African spirituality with Christianity. African spirituality was syncretized with Christianity inside these churches that created a unique branch of Christianity among enslaved and free Black people called Afro-Christianity or African-American Christianity. These practices became the foundation of the Black church today.

=== Beginnings of the modern Black American church ===
An African-American Episcopal priest, George Freeman Bragg, wrote in his historical journal the history of the Black Espical Church began as invisible churches during slavery, and after the Civil War became visible. Other Christian denominations of African-American churches began during slavery starting as invisible churches. As time progressed, many African-American churches became more Christian and less influenced by Hoodoo and Vodun. However, some aspects of African rituals survived in African American Baptist churches and praise houses, such as, shouting, ecstatic forms of praise and worship with singing, clapping, music with drumming and call-and-response.

== Slave narratives ==
Slave narratives are a collection of recorded oral accounts about formerly enslaved people and their experiences of slavery in the United States. In the 1930s, the Federal Writers' Project part of the Works Progress Administration during the Great Depression, provided jobs for unemployed writers to write and collect the experiences of former slaves. Writers, black and white, documented the experiences of the last generation of African Americans born into slavery. Former African American slaves told writers about their slave experience which provided readers a glimpse into the lives of the enslaved revealing the culture of African Americans during slavery. The Library of Congress has 2,300 first-person accounts from former slaves in their digital archive. From these collections, African Americans said they had secret church meetings. For example, enslaved people created methods to decrease their noise when they had church. A former slave in Arkansas named John Hunter said the slaves went to a secret house only they knew and turned the iron pots face up and their slaveholder could not hear them. Enslaved people also placed sticks under wash pots a foot from the ground to decrease their noise as the sound they made during their rituals went into the pots.

A former slave named Taylor said when he was enslaved, his slaveholder hired a white preacher to preach obedience into the slaves. The white preacher told them: "...Serve your masters. Don't steal your master's turkey. Don't steal your master's chickens. Don't steal your master's hawgs. Don't steal your master's meat. Do what-someever your master tells you to do." Taylor later said the slaves would have secret church meetings at night, because what the white preacher preached was not what enslaved people believed. They believed God would free them from slavery. Taylor and the other slaves prayed in a whisper so no one would hear them have church.

== See also ==
- Praise house
- Hush harbor
