= Praise house =

Plantation-era American church building

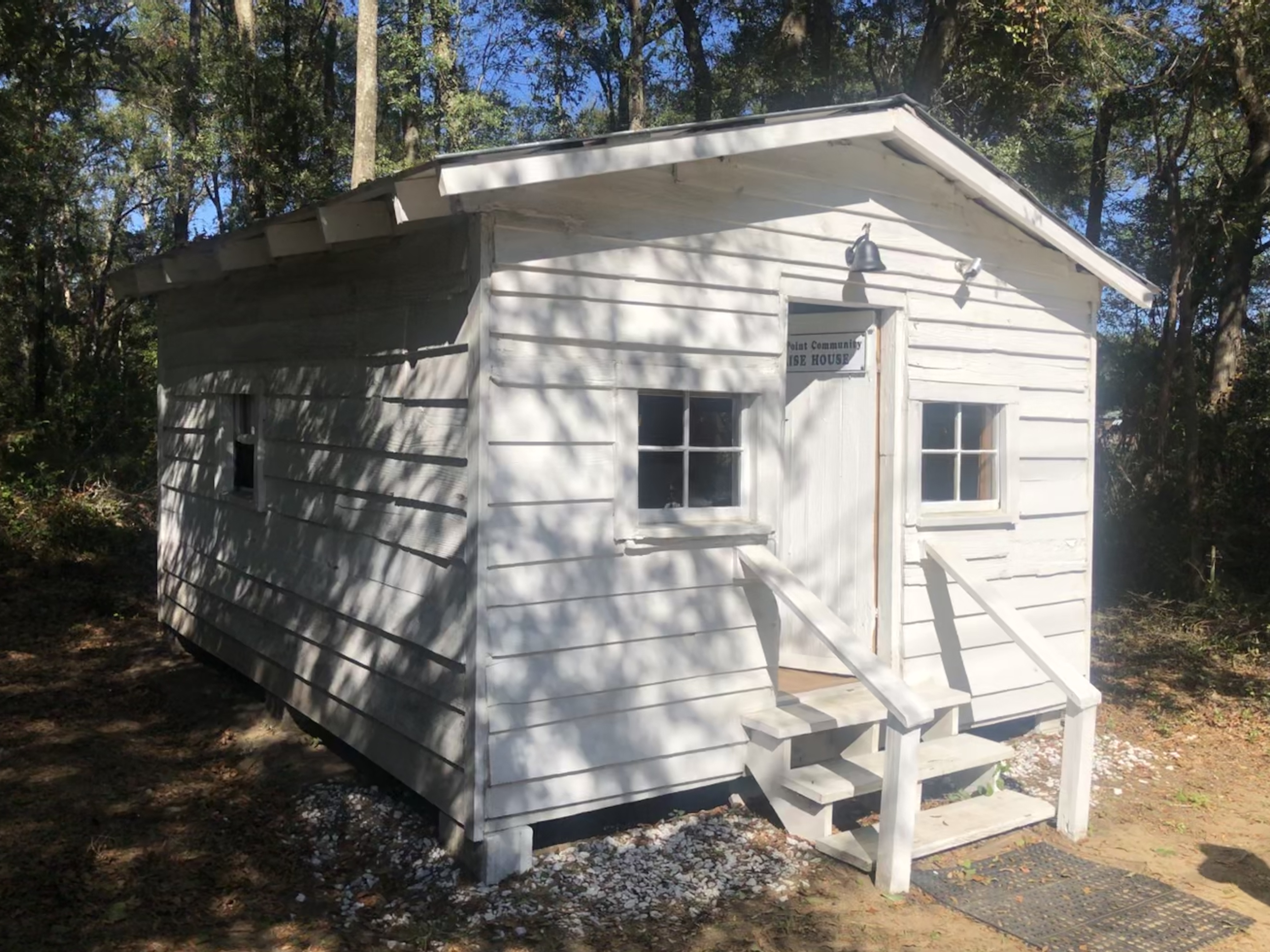
Coffin Point Praise House, one of four surviving praise houses on St. Helena Island, South Carolina

A praise house (also prayer house) was a type of vernacular religious architecture, typically built within the plantation complexes of the American South for the use of enslaved people who were legally bound to the property. Praise houses were a part of the early history of the black church, and there is evidence of Christian practice and praise houses from before the first organized black denominations.

It was often that people under enslavement would have to find and create their own places to practice religion or anything that gave them any sort of freedom. For example, congo-squares were a place where enslaved African Americans could gather to buy and sell things without punishment. However, these simply constructed church buildings were sometimes built by enslavers for their captives as they "regarded Christianity as a stabilizing influence over slaves" and after emancipation, the surviving structures "became important sources of leadership and community among freed African-Americans." Worship was often expected for enslaved African Americans and it was important to be good at music making in the church, not just passionate. Ministers could be expelled for performing poorly. The interiors were typically open and unstructured, which "mirrored the nonliturgical style of slave religion.… The resulting sparseness provided the slaves more room for 'ring shouts' during often all-night sessions of prayer and song." In some cases, this is referred to praise meetings--time when enslaved individuals got together at night to sing.

The true shouť takes place on Sundays or on 'praise'-nights through the week, and either in the praise-house or some cabin in which a regular religious meeting has been held. Very likely more than half the population of the plantation is gathered together. Let it be the evening, and a light-wood fire burns red before the door to the house and on the hearth.… The benches are pushed back to the wall when the formal meeting is over, and old and young, men and women, sprucely-dressed young men, grotesquely half-clad field hands—the women generally with gay handkerchiefs twisted about their heads and with short skirts, boys with tattered shirts and men's trousers, young girls barefooted—all stand up in the middle of the floor, and when the 'sperichil' is struck up, begin first walking and by-and-by shuffling round, one after the other, in a ring. The foot is hardly taken from the floor, and the progression is mainly due to a jerking, hitching motion, which agitates the entire shouter, and soon brings out streams of perspiration. Sometimes they dance silently, sometimes as they shuffle they sing the chorus of the spiritual, and sometimes the song itself is also sung by the dancers. But more frequently a band, composed of some of the best singers and of tired shouters, stand at the side of the room to 'base' the others, singing the body of the song and clapping their hands together or on the knees. Song and dance are alike extremely energetic, and often, when the shout lasts into the middle of the night, the monotonous thud, thud of the feet prevents sleep within half a mile of the praise-house.

— New York Nation, May 30, 1867

== See also ==
- Invisible churches
- Hush harbor
- Slave quarters
- Mary Jenkins Community Praise House
- Eddings Point Community Praise House
