= Eddings Point Community Praise House =

Historic church in South Carolina, United States

- U.S. National Register of Historic Places
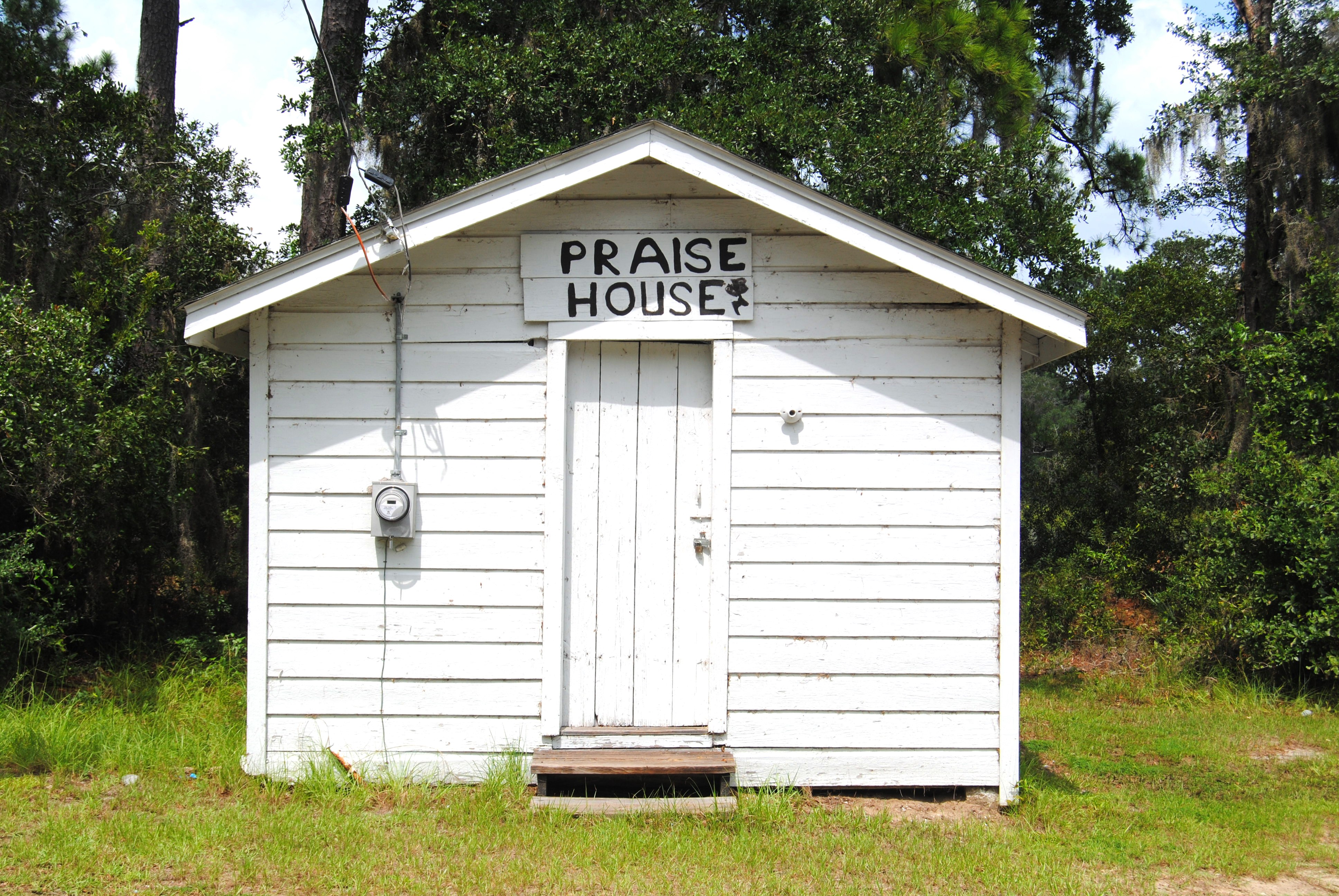

- Location within South Carolina Location within the United States
- Location: On Secondary Road 183, 0.1 miles north of its junction with Secondary Road 74, near Frogmore, South Carolina
- Coordinates: 32°26′36″N 80°32′38″W
- Area: less than one acre
- Built: c. 1900
- MPS: Historic Resources of St. Helena Island c. 1740-c. 1935 MPS
- NRHP reference No.: 88001739
- Added to NRHP: May 19, 1989

Eddings Point Community Praise House is a historic church located on Saint Helena Island near Frogmore, Beaufort County, South Carolina. It was built about 1900, and is a narrow, one-story gable roofed building of frame construction with the entrance in the gable end. It is significant as one of four known extant African-American praise houses on St. Helena Island, and was a central place in the religious and social life of the black islanders.

It was listed in the National Register of Historic Places in 1989.

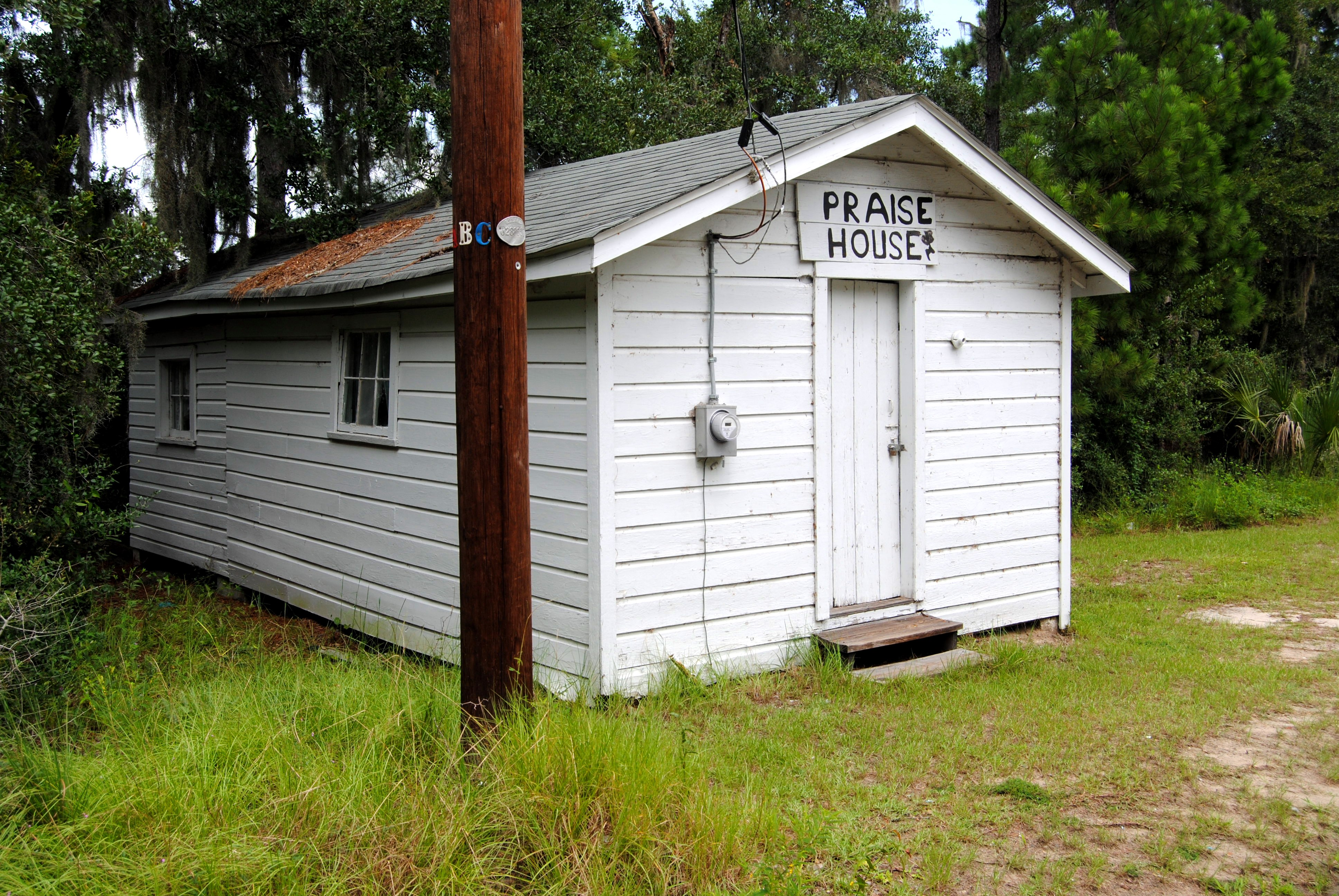
View from the south

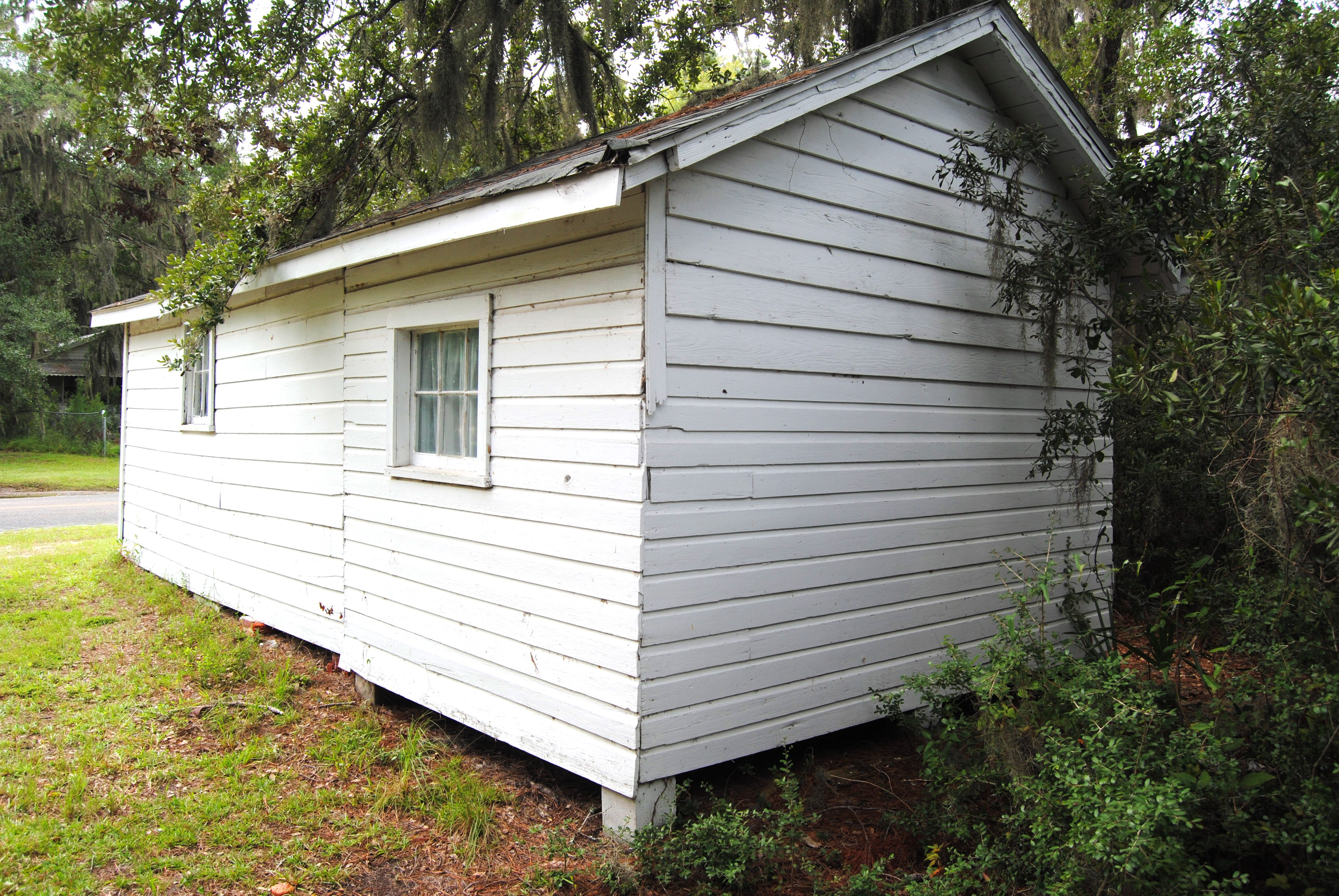
View from the north
