= Mary Jenkins Community Praise House =

Historic church in South Carolina, United States

- U.S. National Register of Historic Places
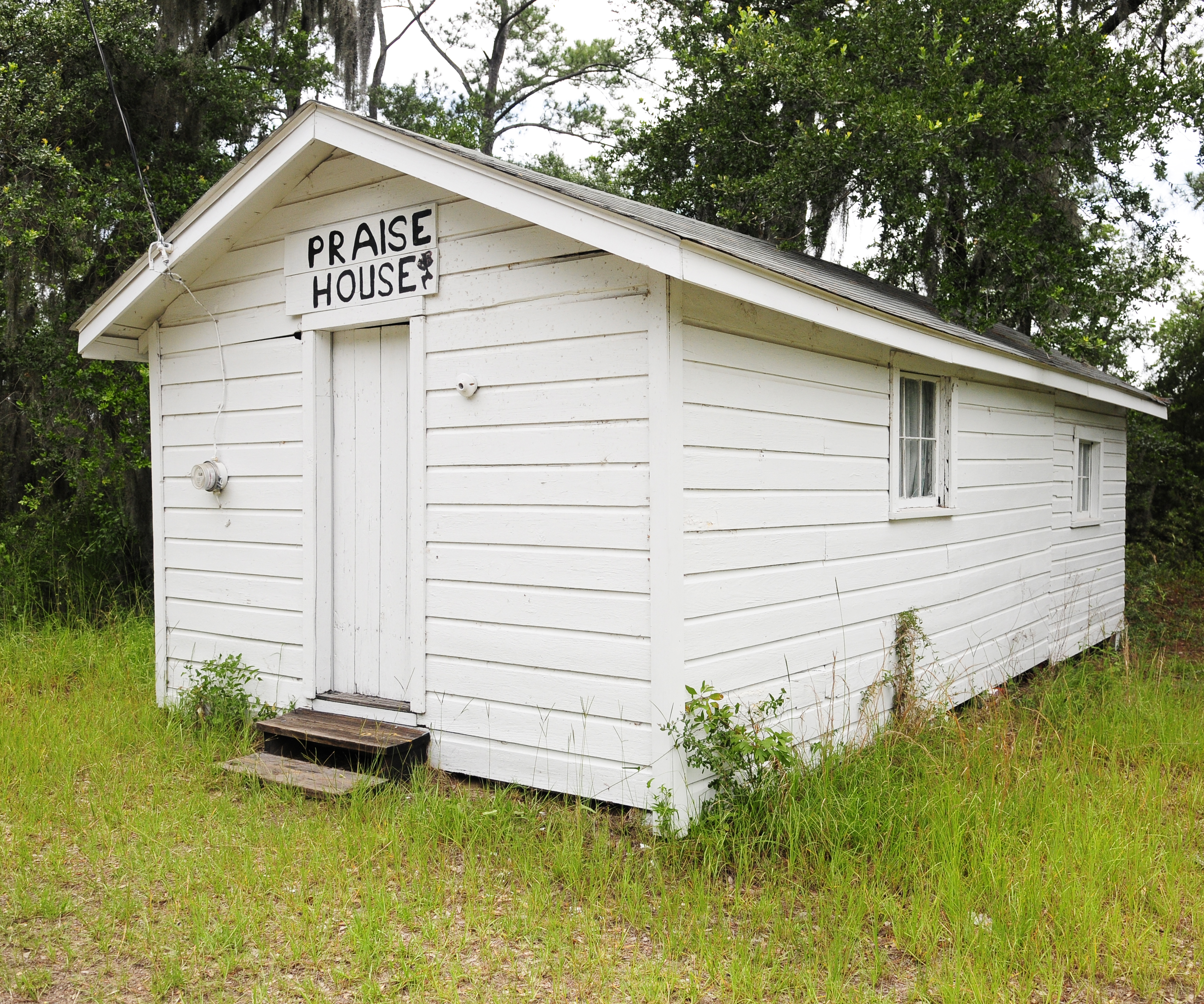
- Mary Jenkins Community Praise House, June 2012

- Location within South Carolina Location within the United States
- Location: On Secondary Road 74, 2.1 miles north of its junction with U.S. Route 21, near Frogmore, South Carolina
- Coordinates: 32°25′47″N 80°33′38″W
- Area: less than one acre
- Built: c. 1900
- MPS: Historic Resources of St. Helena Island c. 1740-c. 1935 MPS
- NRHP reference No.: 88001770
- Added to NRHP: May 19, 1989

Mary Jenkins Community Praise House is a historic church located on Saint Helena Island near Frogmore, Beaufort County, South Carolina. It was built about 1900, and is a narrow, one-story gable roofed building of frame construction with the entrance in the gable end. It is significant as one of four known extant African-American praise houses on St. Helena Island. The building remains in use.

It was listed in the National Register of Historic Places in 1989.
