= Hush harbor =

Place where enslaved African Americans would gather

During antebellum America, a hush harbor (or hush arbor) was a secluded gathering place where enslaved African Americans met secretly to worship and share religious expression outside the supervision of enslavers.

== History ==
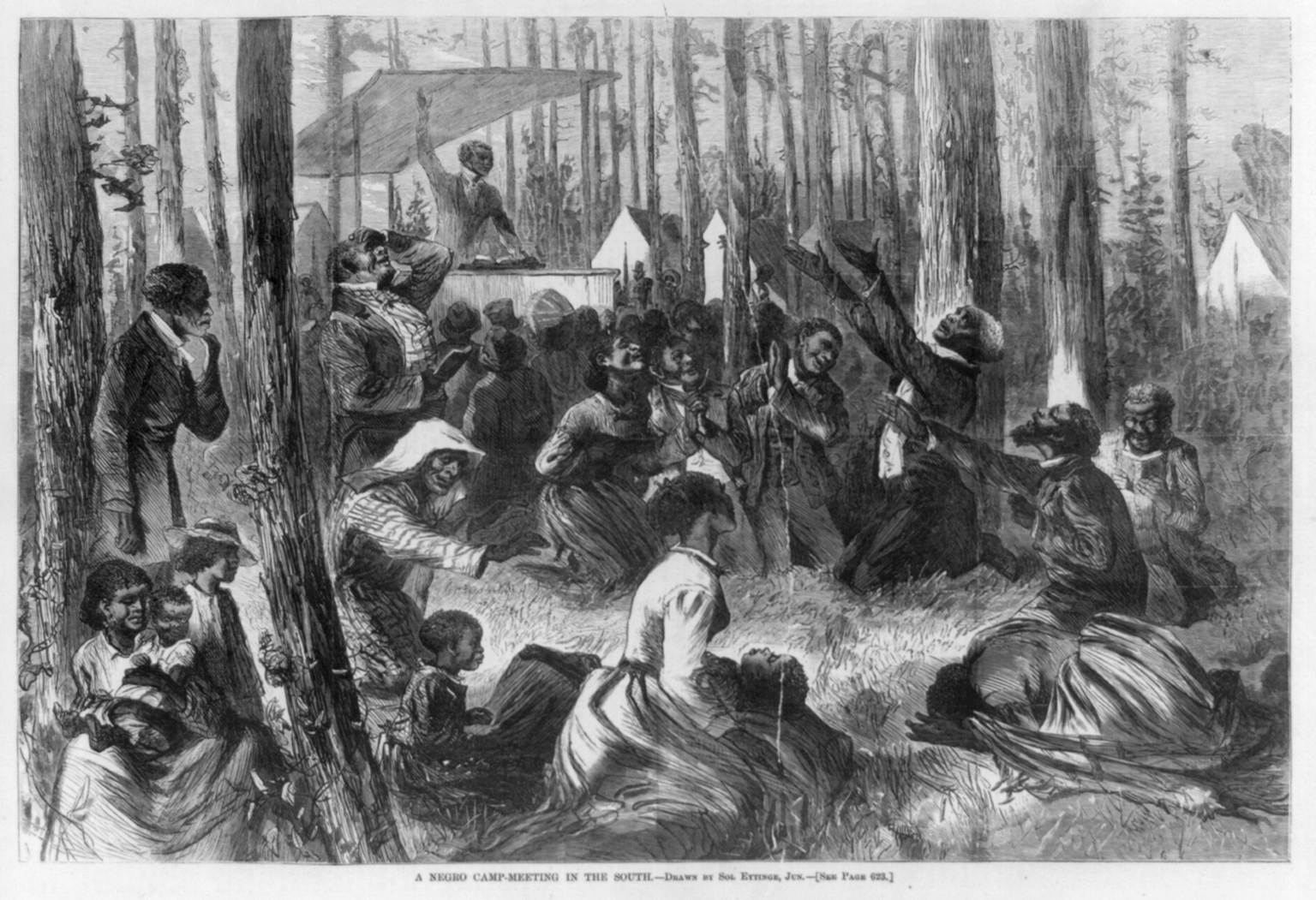
African American churches in slavery and freedom provided places to worship and for African Americans to practice their own version of Christianity.

Religion became a vital source of emotional strength and hope for enslaved African Americans by helping them endure the hardships of slavery. Although many were introduced to Christianity through plantation churches and white missionaries, most enslaved people sought to practice their faith independently. Through the creation of secret gatherings known as hush harbor meetings, enslaved people could worship freely without white supervision and could hear stories from the Bible about Jesus being a liberator. These meetings were held after dark, when house and field chores were completed, and carried on late into the night. Gatherings were held to praise God, enter Heaven to be with their ancestors and God, and to create songs that told of their desire to escape suffering.

Hush harbor meetings often arose alongside formal "slave missions", which allowed white missionaries or plantation owners to teach a version of Christian faith that emphasizes obedience and communal strength to enslaved people. In hush harbor meetings, Christian teachings were reinterpreted to emphasize equality, liberation, and dignity. Biblical stories, particularly the suffering of Jesus Christ, resonated deeply with their own shared experiences and reinforced their faith. Hush harbors served as vital cultural spaces where African religious traditions blended with Christianity, allowing for enslaved people to express themselves through song, dance, and rhythmic worship. In these gatherings are where Negro spirituals originated; they often carried double meanings that reflected hopes for freedom and religious devotion. While under the constant threat of punishment if discovered, these meetings fostered a strong sense of community and identity. Hush harbors laid the groundwork for the development of independent Black churches after emancipation by influencing their leadership, worship styles, and communal practices.

== Hush harbors in popular media ==
From director Tim Story, Barbershop (2002) follows Calvin Palmer Jr., a young African American man facing financial struggles due to inheriting his late father's barbershop in South Side Chicago. Palmer sells the barbershop to a sketchy businessman before discovering its legacy and value to the community. The film shows the barbershop as a sanctuary; African American women and men are able to engage authentically away from the white gaze. The barbershop is portrayed as a community center where conversations range, it reflects a tradition dating back to antebellum times where wisdom and social commentary were passed down, and works as a sanctuary for authentic African American rhetoric, discourse, and cultural history.

Academic scholar, Vorris L. Nunley, argues that the hush harbor portrayed in Barbershop (2002) by the "Black celebrity elite" gave a romanticized performance compared to nuanced, everyday conversations that were had by enslaved African Americans. The film seemed to be approached by a white media framework that replaced radical, authentic hush harbor rhetoric with something more polished and domesticated for a wider audience. By doing this, Nunley critiques the film as a hindering of the expression of ideas and politics that a true hush harbor would produce.

From author Ralph Ellison, Invisible Man (1952) follows an unnamed African American man who is trying to find his identity in racist America. The novel observes his journey from the South to Harlem, New York. The narrator feels "invisible" because society refuses to see that African American women and men possess, deciding to only view them as stereotypes. The narrator navigates Southern racism, Northern prejudice, violence, and betrayals before turning to an underground life. The novel includes this quote:

Ask your wife to take you around to the gin mills and the barber shops and the juke joints and the churches, Brother. Yes, and the beauty parlors on Saturdays when they're frying hair. A whole unrecorded history is spoken then, Brother. You wouldn't believe it but it's true. Tell her to take you to stand in the areaway of a cheap tenement at night and listen to what is said. Put her out on the corner, let her tell you what's being put down.

Ellison highlights the importance of understanding African American experience and identity. By choosing not to see African Americans as something other than a stereotype or political pawn, there is so much to be missed out on. Through Invisible Man, Ellison emphasizes that racism, conflicting ideologies, and the reformist policies, similar to Booker T. Washington, fail to accommodate the complexity of African American existence. Ellison created a novel that went beyond any social and racial injustices experienced at the time. By critiquing human condition and personal responsibility, Ellison identified the American landscape as something absurd and unusual.

== Hush harbors in society ==
Academic scholar, Amber M. Neal-Stanley, emphasizes the concept of hush harbors being a powerful, historical framework for recreating education as a space of healing for African American students. Neal-Stanley maintains that hush harbors were created by African Americans to nurture themselves, build community, and worship away from the white society; while in these spaces, experiences of freedom, safety, and care were felt and nurtured. Neal-Stanley asserts this idea into the world of education by comparing how historical African American women teachers, like Lucy Craft Laney, Mary McLeod Bethune, Charlotte Hawkins Brown, and Nannie Helen Burroughs, adopted these practices to undermine oppression.

Neal-Stanley argues that historical African American women teachers originated classroom environments where African American students could develop intellectually, emotionally, and spiritually despite the "anti blackness" of the time; acting as a modern day hush harbor. The author explains that "fugitive" practices of teaching are in control of educational structures. Neal-Stanley insists that hush harbors are a critical tool for educators today, urging that these spaces can disturb systemic inequities, restore African American humanity, and revive spirit towards education.

Academic scholar, Melva L. Sampson, explains how African American women preachers use online environments to create new forms of resistance, religious community, and spiritual authority. Sampson's concern of "digital hush harbors", which reimagines the hush harbors created by enslaved African Americans, as online spaces for healing and deliverance. Sampson observes that African American women preachers have turned to social media to "bypass traditional systems of legitimatization" due to traditional African American churches often excluding individuals who did not conform to their norms, particularly African American women and individuals. with heteronormative identities.

Sampson identifies digital hush harbors within history, comparing them to earlier forms of African American religious expression, including radio preaching, televangelism, and clandestine worship. Sampson emphasizes that digital media expands access, which allows African American women to organize religious experiences that reflect their own lives and theological perspectives. Sampson claims that digital hush harbors are not just technological innovations, but spiritual and political mediation because it provides healing, community, and affirmation while resisting oppressive social structures. Sampson asserts that because of African American women creating networks, it resulted in a new definition of what it means to "be church."

== See also ==
- Brush arbor revival
