= Newington station =

Newington station may refer to:

Transportation:

- Newington Junction station, a CTfastrak bus station and former rail depot in Newington, Connecticut, U.S.
- Newington Railroad Depot, a historic railroad station in Newington, New Hampshire, U.S.
- Newington railway station, on the Chatham Main Line, serving the village of Newington, Kent, England, U.K
- Newington railway station (Edinburgh), a former station on the Edinburgh Suburban and Southside Junction Railway in Newington, Edinburgh, Scotland, U.K.

Location:

- Newington Junction, a neighborhood in Newington, Connecticut, U.S.
- Newington Station (Virginia), a neighborhood in Springfield, Virginia, U.S.

Other:

- Newington Power Plant, also known as Newington Station, near Portsmouth, New Hampshire, U.S.

== See also ==
- Newington (disambiguation)
