= Newington =

Newington may refer to several places:

== Places ==
=== United Kingdom ===
==== England ====
- Newington, London, a district of central London in the London Borough of Southwark
- Newington, Swale, Kent (near Sittingbourne)
- Newington, Folkestone & Hythe, Kent (near Folkestone)
- Newington, Thanet, Kent (near Ramsgate)
- Newington, Oxfordshire
- Newington, Shropshire, within the town of Craven Arms
- Newington, Nottinghamshire
- Newington, a ward of Hull City Council
- Newington Bagpath, Gloucestershire
- North Newington, Oxfordshire
- South Newington, Oxfordshire
- Stoke Newington, a district in London in the London Borough of Hackney

==== Elsewhere ====
- Newington, Belfast, Antrim Road, Northern Ireland
- Newington, Edinburgh, Scotland

=== United States ===
- Newington, Connecticut, a town in Hartford County
- Newington, Georgia, a town in Screven County
- Newington, New Hampshire, a town in Rockingham County
- Newington, Virginia, a census-designated place in Fairfax County
- Newington Forest, Virginia, a census-designated place in Fairfax County

=== Other countries ===
- Newington, New South Wales, Australia
- Newington, Victoria, Australia
- Newington, Ontario, South Stormont, eastern Ontario, Canada
- Newington, Mpumalanga, South Africa

== Historical sites ==
=== Australia ===
- Newington Armory, Newington, New South Wales, a Royal Australian Navy armament depot
- Newington House, Silverwater, New South Wales, a rural colonial villa

=== United States ===
- Newington, alternate named of the David Shields House in Edgeworth, Pennsylvania
- Newington Archaeological Site, in King and Queen Courthouse, King and Queen County, Virginia
- Newington Plantation, an archaeological site near Stallsville, Dorchester County, South Carolina

== Other places ==
=== United Kingdom ===
- Newington Causeway, a road in Southwark, London, between the Elephant and Castle and Borough High Street
- Newington Cemetery, one of the several city cemeteries in Edinburgh, Scotland
- Newington Gardens, park in Southwark, London
- Newington Green, an open space in North London between Islington and Hackney
- Newington West (UK Parliament constituency), in the Newington area of South London

=== Elsewhere ===
- Newington College, Stanmore, New South Wales, Australia
- Newington High School, a public high school located in Newington, Connecticut, U.S.
- Newington Park, a baseball grounds in Baltimore, Maryland, U.S.

== Other uses ==
- HMCS Newington, an 1899 Royal Canadian Navy ship, First World War
- P. C. B. Newington (Philip Campbell Beatson Newington, 1888–1964), author of a cookery book about Malaysian food
- Newington F.C., a football club in Northern Ireland
- Newington Rangers F.C., a football club in Northern Ireland
- Newington station (disambiguation), several places
