= Cape Cod Mall =

Shopping mall in Hyannis, Massachusetts, US

- Location: Hyannis, Barnstable, Massachusetts
- Coordinates: 41.667477°N 70.297951°W
- Opened: June 15, 1970; 56 years ago
- Developer: Davenport Realty, Equity Management
- Manager: Simon Property Group
- Owner: Simon Property Group
- Num. of stores: 82
- Num. of anchor tenants: 9
- Floor area: 723,605 square feet (67,225 m^{2})
- Floors: 1 (2 in Barnes & Noble and both Macy's locations)
- Website: www.simon.com/mall/cape-cod-mall

Cape Cod Mall is a shopping mall in the Hyannis village of Barnstable, Massachusetts. The mall opened in 1970 and was renovated and expanded in the late 1990s, bringing the property to 723,605 square feet (67,225 m^{2}) of gross leasable area. It is currently managed and partially owned by Simon Property Group. The anchor stores are Marshalls, 2 Macy's stores, Entertainment Luxury Cinemas, Target, Dick's Sporting Goods, and Barnes & Noble.

== History ==
=== Opening and expansion ===
The Cape Cod Mall was proposed in the late 1960s as a super-regional retail center for Barnstable County, due in part to rapid population growth. Before the mall was built, a Storyland theme park resided in its location. On June 15, 1970, the mall was opened to the public, with an initial capacity of approximately 50 stores (30-40 were occupied at the time), and was anchored by Filene's, Sears and Woolworth's, all of which formerly had locations in downtown Hyannis on Main Street.

In the spring of 1976, two movie theaters, with two screens each, were built behind the mall. These two theaters would compete directly with the Hyannis Drive-In Theater, which was located right down Route 132, up until 1985.

In 1977, Filene's was expanded to two levels to accommodate the need for more selling space, and became the first location on Cape Cod with escalators. The following year, a new wing was added on the south side of the mall, with 25 additional stores and a fourth anchor, Jordan Marsh (which previously had no presence on the Cape). The mall remained basically the same for the next two decades, with a small food court added and an interior renovation completed in 1986. In 1993, Woolworth's, which by that time was experiencing financial problems, announced their plans to close the mall store, and had vacated by early 1994. In 1996, Jordan Marsh was converted into Macy's after Federated Department Stores merged the chains.

The mall's largest renovation began in the fall of 1998, the same year that Simon acquired the mall (the company currently owns 56.4% of it). An additional, atrium-style wing was built, extending through and beyond the shuttered Woolworth space. This expansion brought 40 new stores, as well as anchor stores Best Buy, Marshalls (which formerly had a store behind the mall) and a two-story 30,000 square feet (2,800 m^{2}) Barnes & Noble (which formerly had a smaller store in the Kmart plaza directly across the street). Also featured in the new wing were a larger food court - with over 10 vendors, seating for approximately 500 people, and a central cathedral skylight - and a carousel. Other projects included doubling the size of Sears (to nearly 140,000 square feet (13,000 m^{2}) in total) and constructing a 12-screen, stadium seating cinema complex (the only one of its kind in Barnstable County; at first owned by Hoyts and later acquired by Regal Cinemas). The old cinemas behind the mall were demolished for parking space.

=== Effects of Federated–May merger ===
In 2005, the May Department Store chain, which included Filene's, was acquired by Federated Department Stores, who owned Macy's. Consequently, in 2006, Federated converted the Filene's store into a Macy's women's/accessory store as their main store, while their preexisting Macy's location (the former Jordan Marsh) became a "men's, kids and home" store. As a result, Cape Cod Mall is one of the few malls to incorporate a second Macy's store following the acquisition of May Department Stores by Federated, enabling Macy's to offer approximately 225,000 square feet (21,000 m^{2}) of total floor space, on par with many of the larger Macy's stores nationwide. The other malls to incorporate a second Macy's (following the closure of their Filene's, or Lord & Taylor, stores) are Emerald Square in North Attleboro, Massachusetts, Fox Run Mall in Newington, New Hampshire, and Northshore Mall in Peabody, Massachusetts.

=== Redevelopment ===
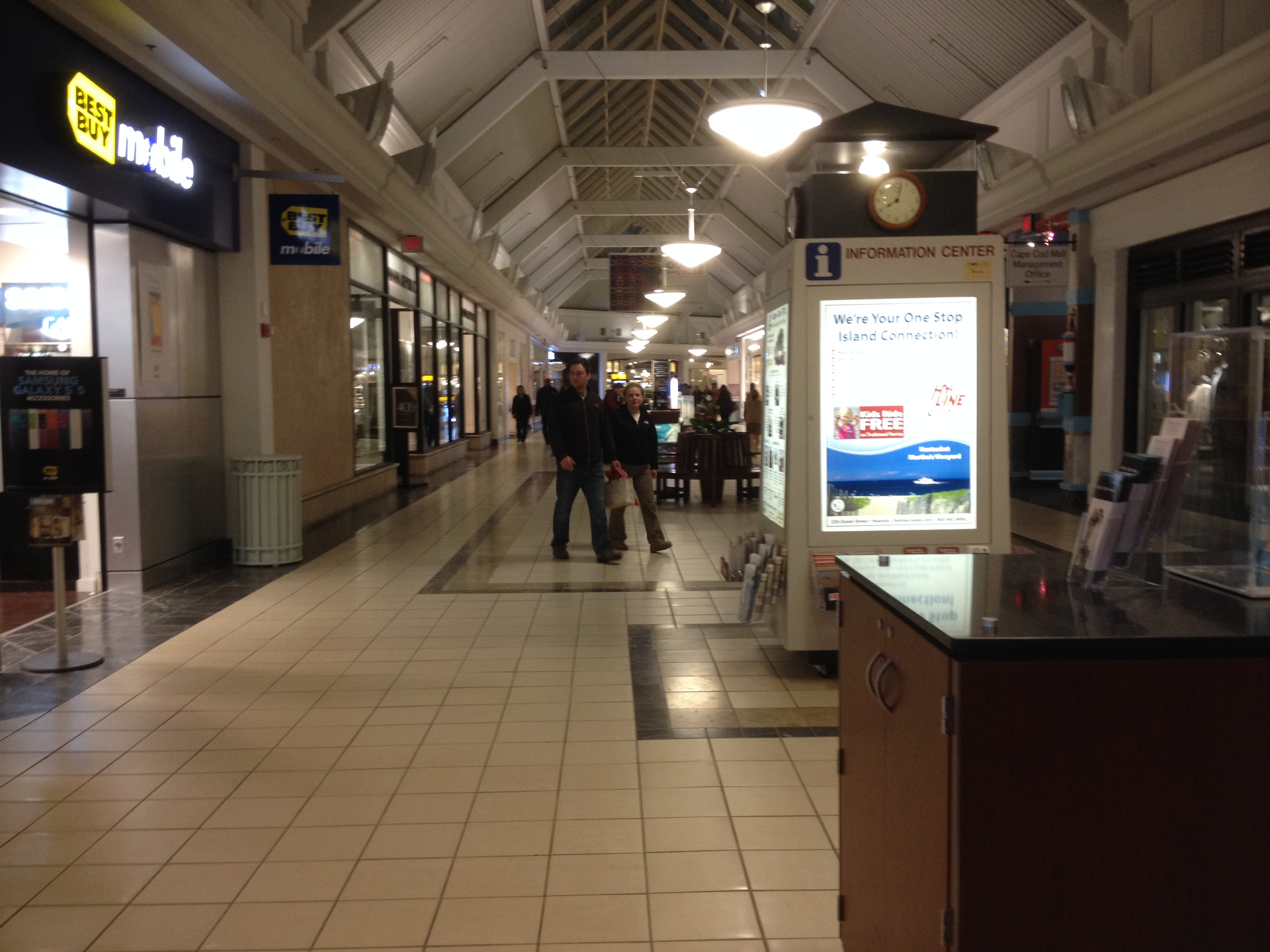
Wing of the mall at night in 2014

On September 20, 2014, three Afghanistan military officers visiting Camp Edwards went missing from the mall during an event where they were to be introduced to American culture. They were later found trying to enter Canada while asking for asylum near Niagara Falls.

On August 8, 2017, Ryan Family Amusements announced that they would be opening the Ten Pin Eatery, a joint venture between Ryan Family Amusements and Chapin's Restaurant Group (a local Cape Cod restaurant chain), in the Macy's Men's, Children's, and Home Furnishings store wing. Construction began in the fall of 2017, the tenant opened on April 23, 2018. It includes a ten-pin bowling alley, a 24-person laser tag center, a full bar and a 50-game arcade.

On April 4, 2018, The Cape Cod Mall and town of Barnstable released to the Cape Cod Times new renderings of a remodeled section of the mall. This rendering showed stores around that area redeveloped into two new department stores at the time named the red tenant (77,450 square feet) and the green tenant (46,050 square feet). The design of red tenant closely resembled the design of a Target store. It was also announced that the Sears Auto Center would be torn down and replaced with 41 new parking spaces.

On July 10, 2018, Target announced they would be building an estimated 80,000 square foot store on to the mall. According to the Target website the store has kids products, basics, appeal, toys, home decor, seasonal items, beach and vacation essentials, and more. The store also has a Starbucks location inside the store. The Target store opened in October 2019. On October 4, 2018, it was announced that Sears would be closing as part of a plan to close 12 stores nationwide. The store closed on December 9, 2018. The following month, CVS, the mall's last remaining original tenant, closed its doors (the chain, however, returned inside the mall's Target store).

In March 2019, mall tenants Five Guys, Chipotle Mexican Grill, and Visionworks—all of which are currently located within the wing of the mall formerly anchored by Sears —- were announced to be relocated to the west side of the mall where Not Your Average Joe's is currently located, and scheduled to open there by fall (coincidentally, Not Your Average Joe's closed for renovations, reopening in November).

On August 13, 2019, a 46,000 square foot Dick's Sporting Goods store was confirmed to be moving into the mall; it opened in the summer of 2020.

On February 1, 2025, the mall Regal Cinemas location closed its doors after being purchased by Bill Hanney with plans to convert the theater into Bill Hanney's Entertainment Experience.

On September 4, 2025, Best Buy announced its location would move out of the mall and into the former Christmas Tree Shops down the road. Best Buy officially relocated and opened in its new location on July 31, 2026.
