= Richard V. Woods Memorial Bridge =

Woods Memorial Bridge
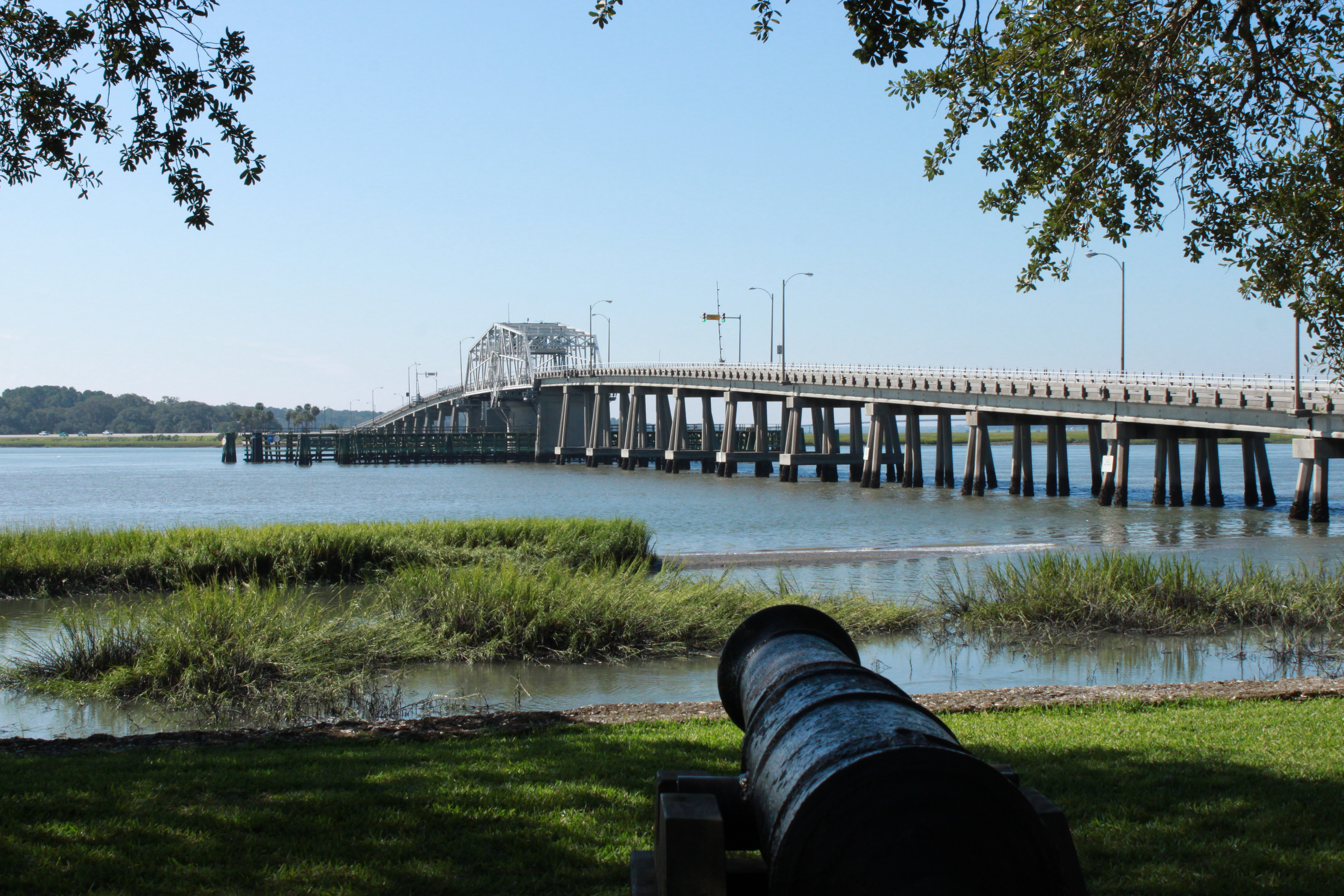
- Coordinates: 32°25′39″N 80°40′09″W
- Carries: US 21 Bus.
- Crosses: Beaufort River (Intracoastal Waterway)
- Locale: Beaufort – Lady's Island, South Carolina, United States
- Official name: Richard V. Woods; Memorial Bridge
- Maintained by: South Carolina Department of Transportation

Characteristics
- Design: Movable swing
- Width: 28 feet (8.5 m)
- Load limit: 20 tons (18 metric tons)
- Clearance below: 30 ft (9.1 m) (closed)

History
- Opened: 1959
- Lady's Island Bridge
- U.S. National Register of Historic Places
- NRHP reference No.: 100008530
- Added to NRHP: January 6, 2023

Location
- Interactive map of Woods Memorial Bridge

The Richard V. Woods Memorial Bridge (known locally as the Woods Bridge), is a swing bridge that connects downtown Beaufort with Lady's Island and the outer Sea Islands in Beaufort County, South Carolina. Originally named Lady's Island Bridge, it was renamed in 1971 in memory of Richard V. Woods (1935–1969), who was a South Carolina Highway Patrol officer killed in the line of duty. It was opened on December 17, 1959, replacing an earlier swing-bridge that was built 1927.

The bridge swings on its central pier to open for boat traffic that is too tall to clear the bridge, and has an operator's station in the center of the span from which an attendant can operate the bridge. Due to the presence of the Intracoastal Waterway, the bridge is required to open frequently for boat traffic to pass through.

The bridge was featured in the film Forrest Gump (1994) as a stand-in for a bridge across the Mississippi River. In the film, Forrest Gump is interviewed by television reporters about his cross-country running trip while crossing the bridge.

In January 2023, the bridge was listed on the National Register of Historic Places, under its original name, Lady's Island Bridge.

== Gallery of images ==
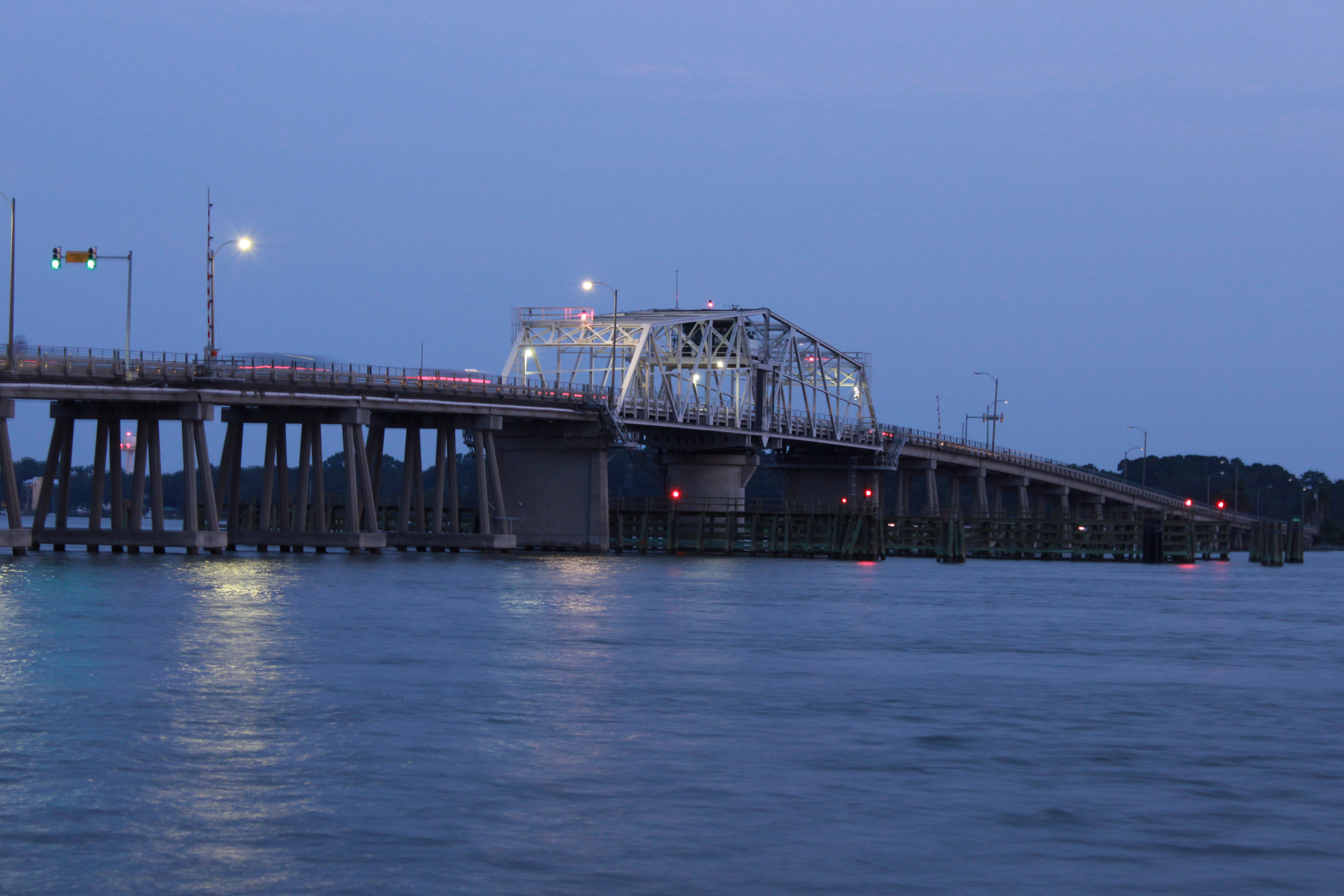
A view of the bridge at night from Downtown Beaufort's Henry C. Chambers Waterfront Park

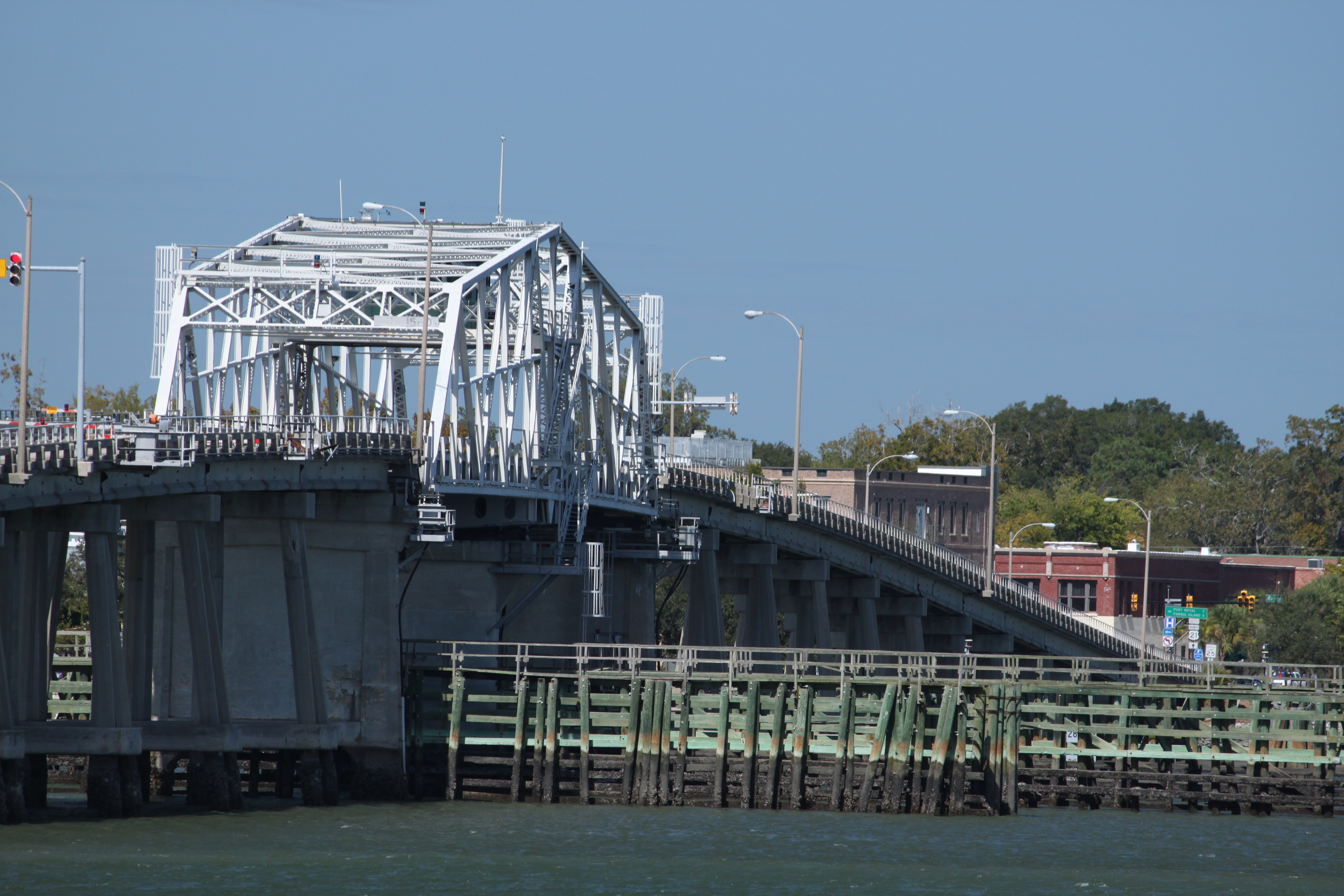
The bridge is shown from Lady's Island.

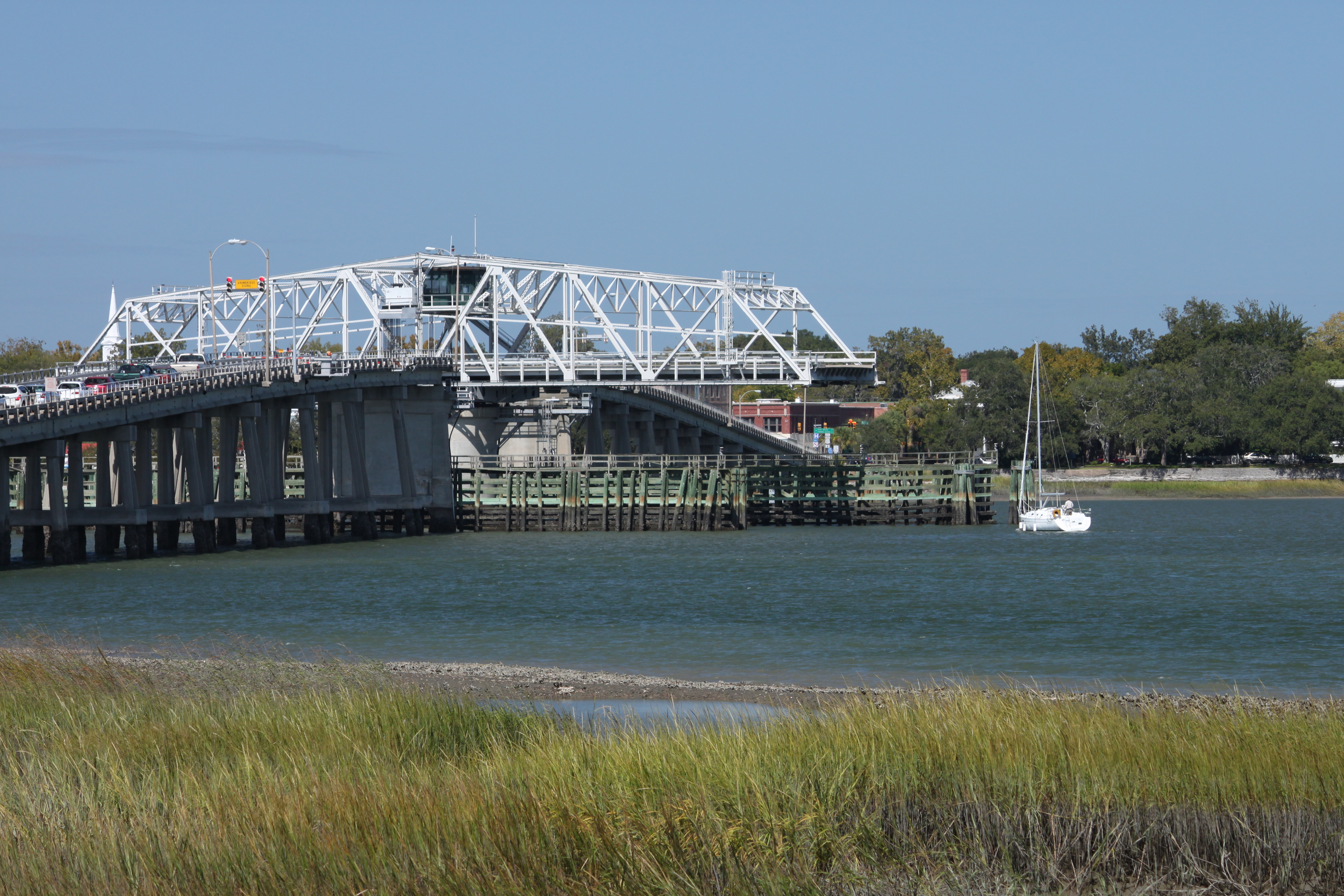
The bridge is shown in the open position to allow a sailboat to pass.

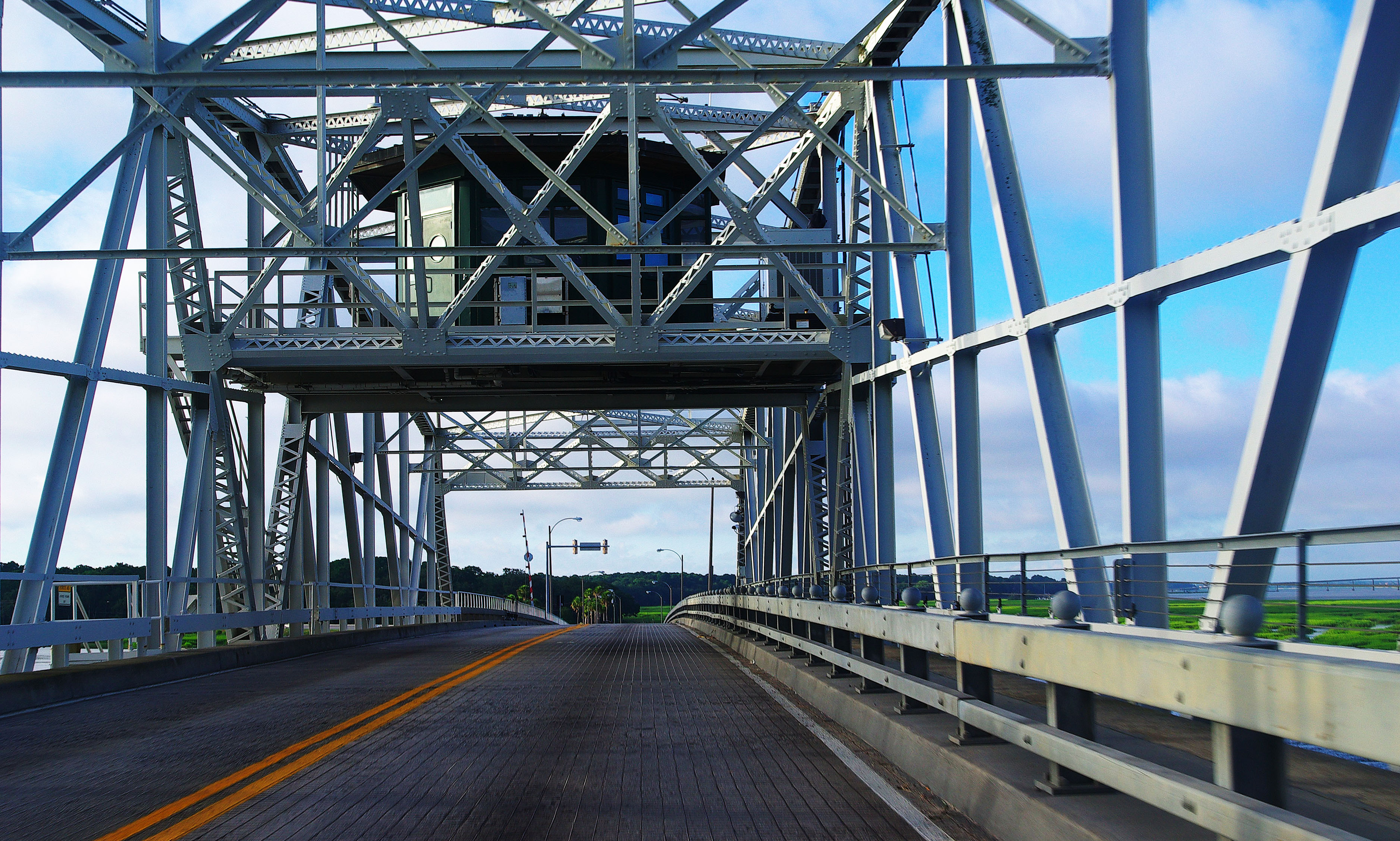
Roadway view on the swing-span section
