= Beaufort County Airport =

Airport in South Carolina, United States

Beaufort Executive Airport
- IATA: BFT; ICAO: KARW; FAA LID: ARW

Summary
- Airport type: Public
- Owner: County of Beaufort
- Serves: Lady's Island
- Elevation AMSL: 9 ft (2.7 m)
- Coordinates: 32°24′44″N 080°38′04″W
- Website: www.beaufortcountyairport.com/...

Map
- Location of airport in South Carolina

Runways
Direction	Length		Surface
Direction	ft	m	Surface
7/25	3,434	1,047	Asphalt

Statistics (2018)
- Aircraft operations: 18,000
- Based aircraft: 36
- Source: Federal Aviation Administration

Beaufort Executive Airport (IATA: BFT, ICAO: KARW, FAA LID: ARW, formerly 73J) is a county-owned, public-use airport in Beaufort County, South Carolina, United States. The airport is located on Lady's Island, 3 nautical miles (5.6 kilometres) southeast of the central business district of Beaufort, South Carolina. It is also known as Frogmore Intranational Airport.

This airport is included in the National Plan of Integrated Airport Systems for 2021–2025, which categorized it as a general aviation facility.

Although many U.S. airports use the same three-letter location identifier for the FAA and IATA, this airport is assigned ARW by the FAA and BFT by the IATA (which assigned ARW to Arad Airport in Arad, Romania).

Beaufort is also known for hosting Marine Corps Air Station Beaufort (ICAO: KNBC, FAA LID: NBC), located 10 kilometres (6.2 mi) southwest of Beaufort County Airport.

== Facilities and aircraft ==
Beaufort Executive Airport covers an area of 110 acres (45 ha) at an elevation of 9 feet (2.7 m) above mean sea level. It has one runway designated 7/25 with an asphalt surface measuring 3,434 feet (1,047 m) by 75 feet (23 m).

For the 12-month period ending 3 July 2018, the airport had 18,000 aircraft operations, on average 49 per day: 97.4% general aviation and 2.6% air taxi. At that time there were 36 aircraft based at this airport: 81% single-engine, 8% multi-engine, and 11% helicopter.

== Cargo airlines ==
Airlines	Destinations
Planemaster for UPS Airlines	Columbia (SC)

== See also ==
- List of airports in South Carolina
