= Mall at Fox Run =

Defunct mall in New Hampshire, United States

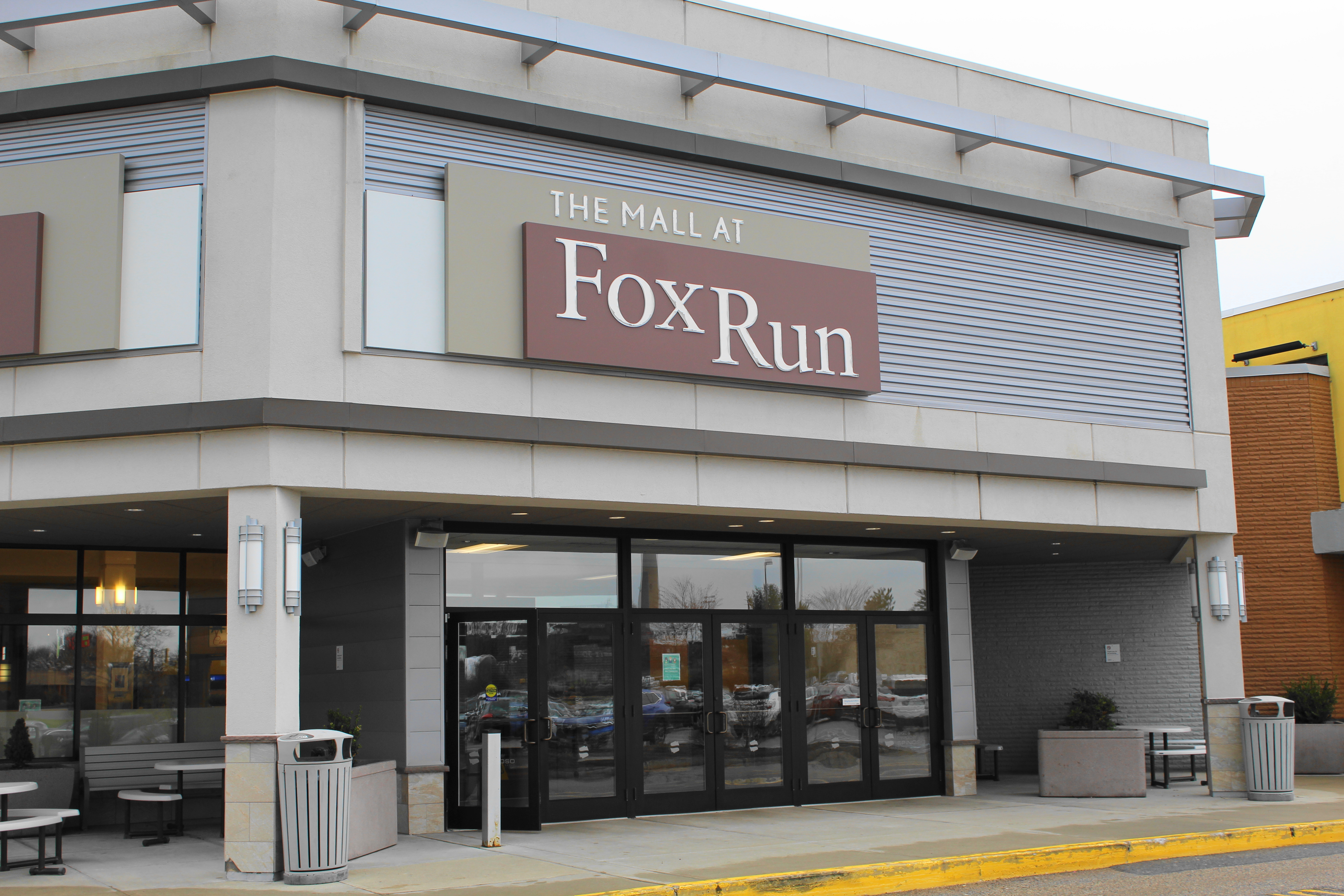
- An entrance to the Mall at Fox Run, August 2022
- Location: Newington, New Hampshire, U.S.
- Coordinates: 43°05′51″N 70°48′19″W
- Address: 50 Fox Run Road
- Opened: February 13, 1983; 43 years ago
- Closed: January 31, 2026; 9 months ago
- Demolished: late May 2026 (ongoing)
- Previous names: Fox Run Mall (1983–2011)
- Manager: Torrington Properties
- Owner: Torrington Properties
- Num. of stores: 84 (at peak)
- Num. of anchor tenants: 4
- Floor area: 603,618 square feet (56,078 m^{2})
- Floors: 1
- Logo shown was used from 1983 to 2011 (logotype written as "Fox Run Mall") and from 2018 to 2026.

The Mall at Fox Run (named Fox Run Mall from 1983 to 2011) was an enclosed shopping mall in Newington, New Hampshire, just north of Portsmouth. The mall opened on February 13, 1983, and permanently closed on January 31, 2026. Demolition began late May 2026 to be replaced with a new development called Seacoast Landing, which will include a Costco location as one of its tenants.

At the time of its closure, the mall had two anchor stores, Macy's Men's & Home Store (formerly Jordan Marsh) and Macy's Women's (formerly Filene's), which both closed by March 2026. It also had two other anchor locations, which had previously housed Sears and JCPenney. At 603,618 square feet (56,077.9 m^{2}), it was New Hampshire's fourth-largest mall, with 84 shops, all on one level. Completed in 1983 as Fox Run Mall, the mall functioned mainly as a successor to the smaller and dated Newington Mall, which was subsequently converted into a big-box retail center known as The Crossings. (Note: Located at 45 Gosling Road in Newington at 43.09441°N 70.8005°W.)

The mall was located just off U.S. Route 4 and the Spaulding Turnpike (NH Route 16), less than five minutes from Interstate 95. The mall was approximately 3 miles (5 km) from the Maine state border, and like the Pheasant Lane Mall and the Mall at Rockingham Park near the Massachusetts border, the Fox Run Mall drew a significant portion of its business from out-of-state customers (mostly from Maine) seeking to take advantage of New Hampshire's tax-free retail climate.

== History ==
For many years, the Mall at Fox Run had four anchor department stores: Sears, J. C. Penney, Macy's (formerly Jordan Marsh), and Filene's. The Filene's brand was discontinued following the Federated Department Stores and May Department Stores merger. The other malls that have done this are the Cape Cod Mall in Hyannis, Massachusetts, and the Northshore Mall in Peabody, Massachusetts.

In 2015, Sears Holdings spun off 235 of its properties, including the Sears at the Mall at Fox Run, into Seritage Growth Properties. On October 15, 2018, it was announced that Sears would be closing as part of its plan to close 142 stores nationwide.

The mall was originally managed by JLL, and from 2011 through 2017 by Simon Property Group, who renamed the mall to its final name shortly after acquisition. From January 1, 2018, until August 3, 2023, the mall was leased and managed by Spinoso Real Estate Group. Subsequently, the mall was acquired by Massachusetts-based property management group Torrington Properties for $17.5 million. In addition to the mall, Torrington owned the adjacent Newington Park Shopping Center, which Torrington took ownership of in 2021.

In February 2025, it was announced that JCPenney would be closing on May 25, 2025, leaving the two Macy's stores as the last anchors. That same year, Torrington announced that the mall will be demolished in 2026 to be redeveloped into a new commercial space called Seacoast Landing. Torrington said that the redevelopment would cost around $500 million.

On January 8, 2026, Macy's announced that it would be closing as part of a plan to close 14 stores by the end of Q1 2026. This would leave the mall with no anchors, cementing its status as a "dead mall".

== Architecture and layout ==
The mall opened in 1983 as an 82-acre (33 ha) property that followed the standard architectural look of the time. Some of its main architectural features included open floor layouts, a single-story design and a strategic placement of anchor stores at each end to draw customers attention. These original anchor stores were Filene's, J. C. Penney and Sears. The interior also included numerous skylights all along the main walkway. This 1983-style design, popular in many malls of the era, intended to provide a feeling of light and openness for shoppers. The mall included lots of wide indoor hallways that created a generous amount of space for shoppers.

In 2021, the mall underwent changes, with the children's play area moved into the center court, emphasizing the role of that area as a gathering space, along with an area to help guide shoppers through the mall.

== Food court ==
The food court was located in the center of the mall. The food court consisted of occupants such as Orange Julius, Roman Delight Pizza, Sarku Japan, the Pink Hippo Cafe, and One Love cuisine. By the mall's closure in January 2026, Sarku Japan and Roman Delight Pizza were the last two remaining restaurants in the mall.

== Demolition and redevelopment ==
In October 2025, The Portsmouth Herald reported that demolition of the 600,000-square-foot (56,000 m^{2}) mall was set to begin in early to mid 2026. It was also stated that the demolition would take around three to six months to complete. This was dependent on the permitting and construction schedule of the demolition. As a result, the new development of Seacoast Landing was expected to start around the second half of 2026.

A September 2025 article in Business NH Magazine reported that small business owners inside the mall were getting ready for the shut down, with their leases expiring in January 2026. The article looked into several small businesses within the mall including Fox Run Dance Hall and Studio, Sweet Josie’s Candy Shoppe, One Love Cuisine, Cottage Chic, Mugshots, and Pet Wants. Some of these businesses planned to relocate to nearby locations such as the outlet centers in Kittery, Maine, or switch to fully online business models. Store owners noted how recent changes in shopping, like the rise in online stores, contributed to the decline of the mall's success.

A report on January 23, 2026, by Red Post Realty stated that demolition was expected to begin in May 2026 (demolition began late that month) and was expected to last for eight months.
