= First African Baptist Church (Beaufort, South Carolina) =

Religious institution

Coordinates: 32°26′04″N 80°40′07″W

First African Baptist Church is a church in Beaufort, South Carolina, that was built by freed slaves after the American Civil War. It is at 601 New Street. Robert Smalls was a member of the congregation. Rev. Arthur Waddell was one of its organizers.

According to a historical marker at the church it is constructed in the Carpenter Gothic style. The church ran a school. The church is part of the Beaufort Historic District.
