= Lady's Island (South Carolina) =

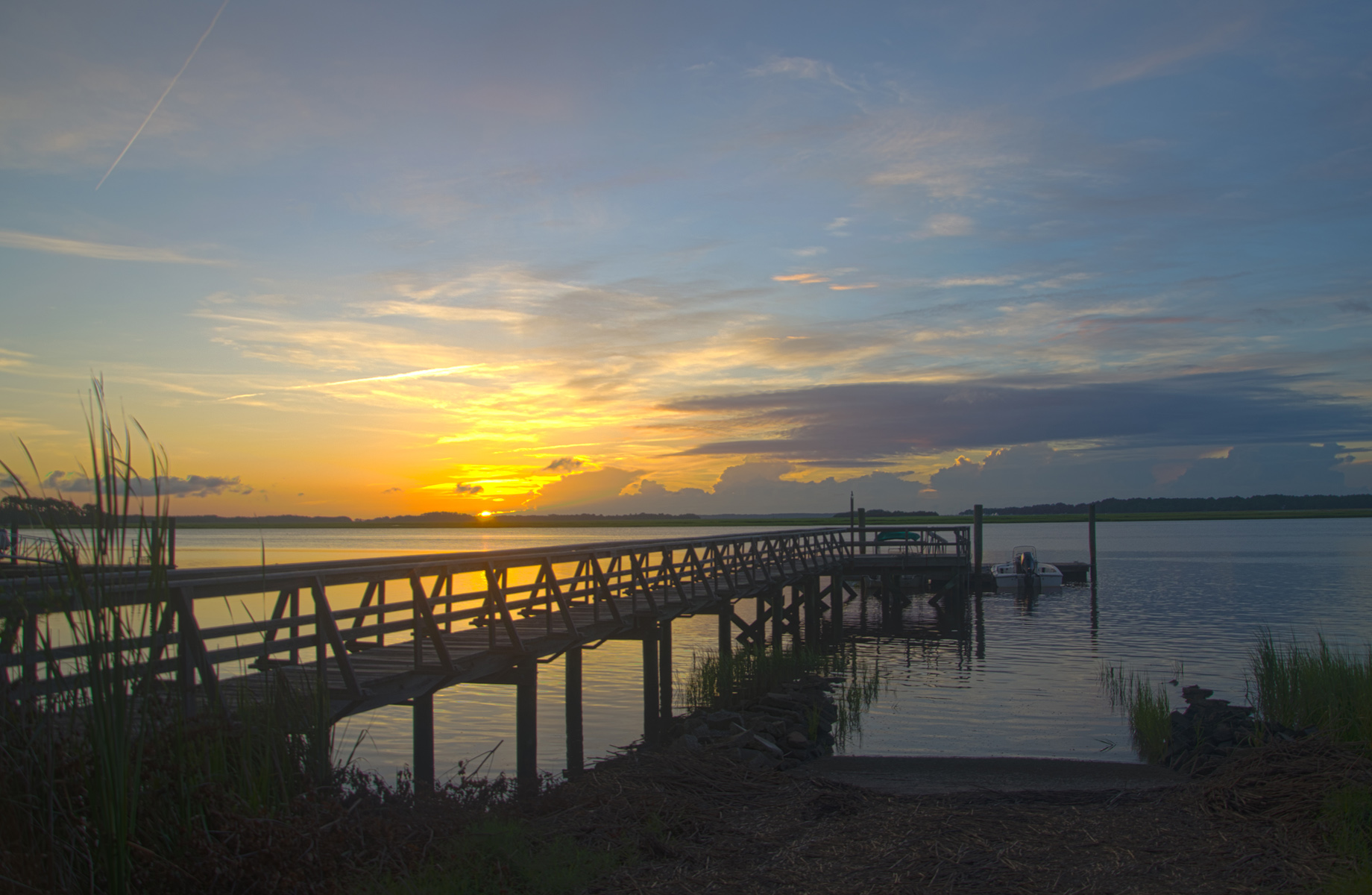
- Pier on Lady's Island, July 2013
- Nickname: Ladies Island
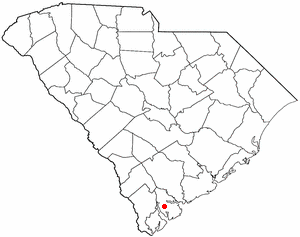
- Location of Lady's Island, Beaufort, South Carolina
- Coordinates: 32°23′0″N 80°41′44″W
- Country: United States
- State: South Carolina
- County: Beaufort
- Elevation: 16 ft (5 m)

Population (2010)
  - Total: 12,570
- Time zone: UTC-5 (Eastern (EST))
  - Summer (DST): UTC-4 (EDT)
- ZIP codes: 29907
- Area codes: 843, 854

Lady's Island is a predominantly residential Sea Island located in Beaufort County, South Carolina. Small portions of the island are within the City of Beaufort, while the majority of the island remains unincorporated. The South Carolina Highway 802, also known locally as Sams Point Road, serves as the principal highway for Lady's Island and provides the only access to Coosaw Island.

== History ==
The Coosaw band of Native Americans lived in the high ground of Coosaw Point on Lady's Island. Decorative pottery shards and oyster shells are part of the history of where they prepared the oysters gathered from the Coosaw river. Lady's Island was named in 1698, in honor of Lady Elizabeth Axtell Blake, wife of Joseph Blake, governor of colonial South Carolina. She and her mother, Lady Rebecca Axtell, owned Newington Plantation in present-day Summerville, South Carolina. The island is sometimes called Combachee, Combee, or Comber Island for the ACE Basin river that flows along its border.

During the American Civil War, Union forces occupied the islands under the direction of General T. W. Sherman. All of the plantations gave way to military occupation. the major post on Lady's Island was "Coosaw" or "Sams' fort on the northeastern point of the Island. At this time there were about 30 plantations on the Ladys' Island.

The island was predominantly rural and agricultural in character for much of its history. In 1927, the first bridge connected downtown Beaufort with Lady's Island. As development of Beaufort and surrounding areas began in the last half of the 20th century, the island began to develop former plantation and timber tracts into residential subdivisions. A second bridge connected Ladys Island with Port Royal in the 1980s.

== Economy ==
The island is home to four public schools (two elementary, one middle, and one high school), Beaufort Academy, a K-12 private school, and Saint Peter's Catholic School, a K3-6 private Catholic school. Commercial development clustered at the intersection of S.C. Highway 802 and U.S. Highway 21 serves Lady's Island, Beaufort, and the surrounding Sea Islands of northern Beaufort County. The island is also the location of the Beaufort County Airport. Faith Communities located on the island include First Scots Presbyterian Church of Beaufort, St. John's Lutheran Church, Sea Island Presbyterian Church, St. Peter's Catholic Church, Meadowbrook Baptist Church, Unitarian Universalist Fellowship of Beaufort, Israelite Baptist Church, Grace Chapel AME Church, Lady's Island Baptist Church, Water's Edge New United Methodist Church, and Tidal Creek Fellowship.

== Ecosystems ==
Lady's Island has three ecosystems: the maritime ecosystem of upland forest area, the estuarine ecosystem of deep water didal habitats, and the palustrine ecosystem of fresh water wetlands.

== Notable people ==
- Lady Elizabeth Axtell Blake, Ladys Island was named in honor of her
- Joseph Blake, governor of colonial South Carolina
