= Beth Israel Congregation (Beaufort, South Carolina) =

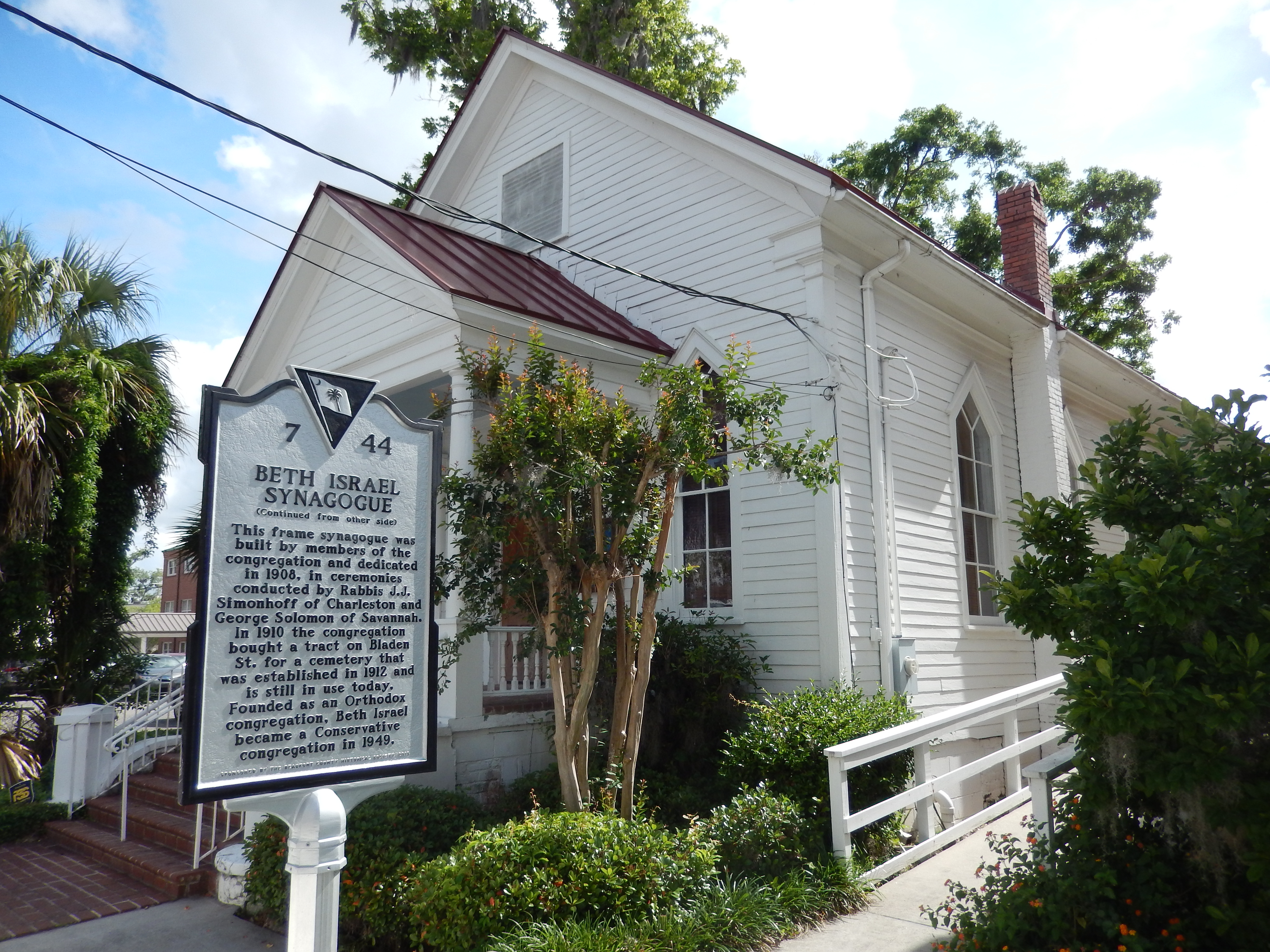
- Beth Israel synagogue

- Location in South Carolina

Religion
- Affiliation: Conservative Judaism
- Ecclesiastical or organisational status: Synagogue
- Leadership: Rabbi: vacant
- Status: Active

Location
- Location: 401 Scott Street, Beaufort, South Carolina
- Country: United States
- Coordinates: 32°25′54″N 80°40′15″W

Architecture
- Style: Colonial Revival
- Established: 1905 (as a congregation)
- Completed: 1908
- Materials: Wood

Website
- bethisraelbeaufortsc.com

Beth Israel Congregation (or Beth Israel Synagogue) is a Conservative synagogue located at 401 Scott Street in Beaufort, South Carolina, in the United States. Built in 1908, it is one of the few wooden synagogues in continued usage in the southeastern United States.

== History ==
Though the number of Jews remained sporadic and sparse until the 1880s, Jews always fared well in the small coastal town of Beaufort, South Carolina. With the mass immigration of Yiddish-speaking Eastern European Jews to Beaufort beginning in the 1880s, the Jewish population of the town grew to well over 30 families and soon prompted the need for a formal congregation. Countries of origin included Russia, Latvia, and Lithuania. The Jewish community prayed informally in a number of locations before obtaining space in the town's Masonic Hall and in the Beaufort Arsenal.

Granted a state charter in 1905, the congregation was formed to purchase the land near the Arsenal that became the site for their synagogue on Scott Street. A number of members participated in the construction of the building, which was dedicated in ceremonies held on June 14, 1908, which were led by Rabbi George Solomon of Savannah, Georgia. Initially an Orthodox congregation, Beth Israel became a Conservative congregation in 1949.

The congregation celebrated its 100th anniversary in 2005. Cantor Sheldon Feinberg noted that "to keep any entity for this length of time, particularly a house of worship, demands a great deal of dedication on the part of the members." President Joann Schor stated that beyond celebrating the synagogue's centennial, their task was "figuring out how to keep going for another 100 years."

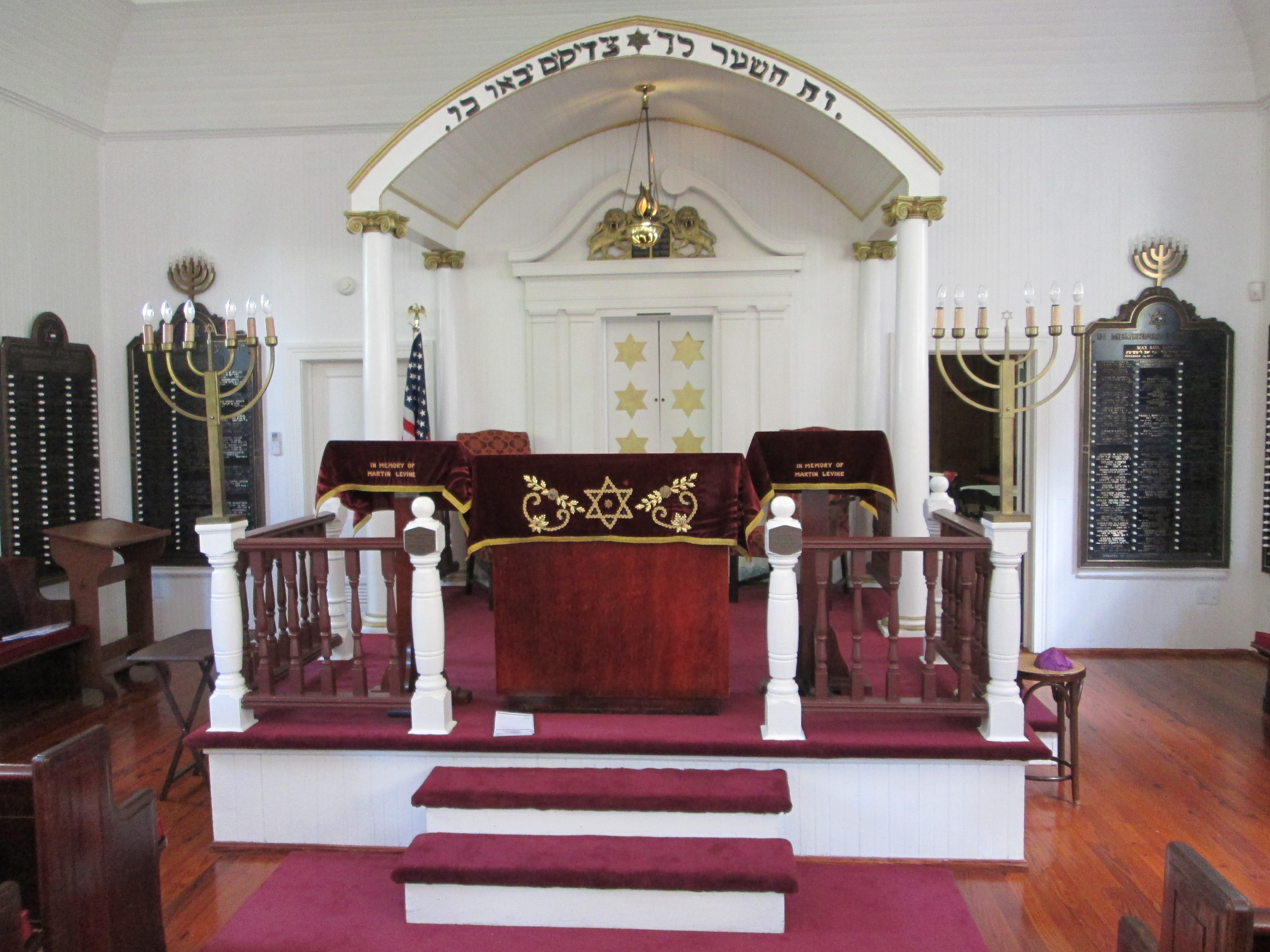
Sanctuary at Beth Israel Congregation, Beaufort, SC

== Current status ==
Beth Israel is an active Conservative congregation today with approximately 85 member-families at its original building. An historical marker honoring the synagogue was unveiled on January 12, 2014.
