= Newington station (New Hampshire) =

- Newington Railroad Depot
- U.S. National Register of Historic Places
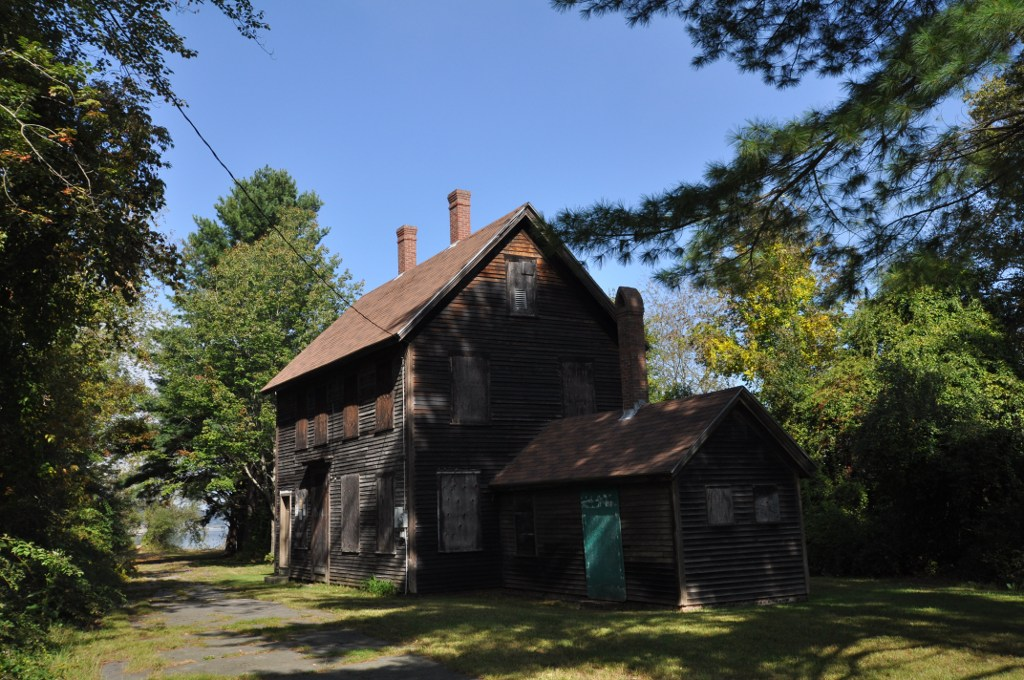

- Location within New Hampshire Location within the United States
- Location: Bloody Point Rd., Newington, New Hampshire
- Coordinates: 43°7′2″N 70°49′18″W
- Area: 3.9 acres (1.6 ha)
- Built: 1873
- Built by: Portsmouth and Dover Railroad
- Architectural style: Late Victorian
- NRHP reference No.: 10000187
- Added to NRHP: April 19, 2010

The Newington Railroad Depot is a historic railroad station on Bloody Point Road in Newington, New Hampshire. Built in 1873, it is an unusual railroad-related structure, serving as a passenger and freight depot, and as the residence of the stationmaster, who also performed the role of toll collector for the nearby bridge. It is the only surviving 19th-century railroad-related structure in Newington. Now vacant and owned by the state, the building was listed on the National Register of Historic Places in 2010.

== Description and history ==
The former Newington Railroad Depot is located near the tip of Bloody Point, a peninsular projection that separates New Hampshire's Great Bay from the Piscataqua River. It is located on the west side of a former railroad alignment, and its 3.87-acre (1.57 ha) parcel includes foundational remains of a period bridge abutment. It is a 2 1/2-story wood-frame structure, with a gabled roof and clapboarded exterior. The east side faced the tracks, and has one entrance that historically led to the waiting room; there are two entrances on the west side.

The building was constructed in 1873 by the Dover and Portsmouth Railroad to provide passenger and freight services, and to provide housing for the stationmaster. This type of depot, integrating all of the functions and providing housing, was generally rare, and this surviving example is particularly well preserved. The bridge across the mouth of Great Bay was completed in 1874, carrying a single railroad track as well as space for carriages and pedestrians. The stationmaster, in addition to managing the station, collected tolls for pedestrians and carriages crossing the bridge, and operated the swing section of the bridge to permit boat traffic to pass. It remained in service until the completion of the General Sullivan Bridge in 1934. The rail line was subsequently abandoned, and the nearby tracks were taken up in 1940.

== See also ==
- National Register of Historic Places listings in Rockingham County, New Hampshire
