= Newington Center Historic District =

Historic district in New Hampshire, United States

- U.S. National Register of Historic Places
- U.S. Historic district
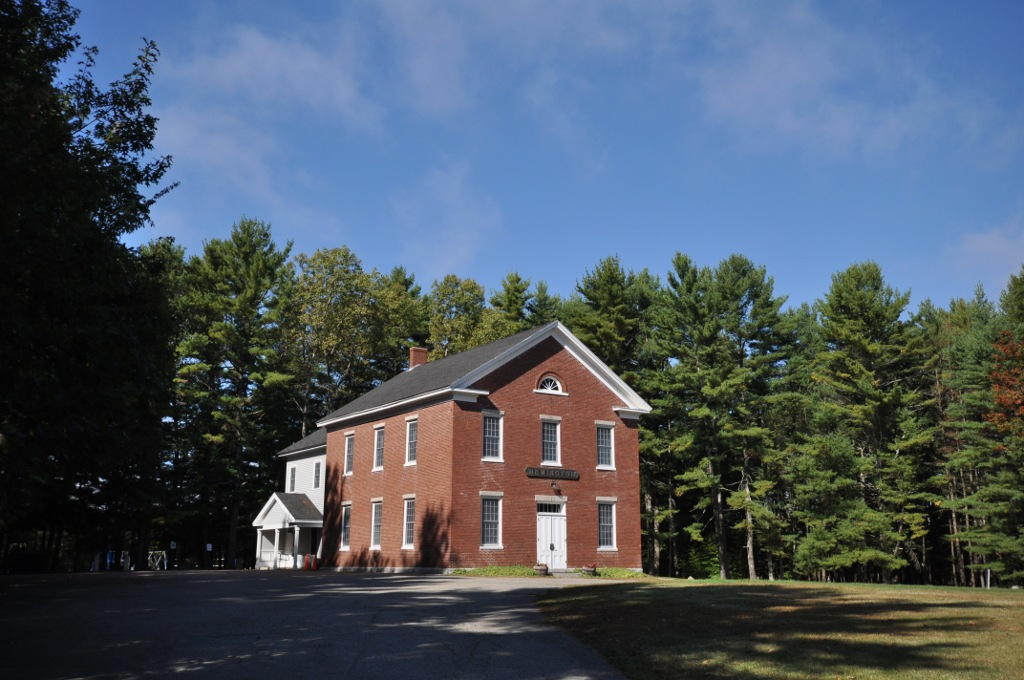
- Old Town Hall

- Location within New Hampshire Location within the United States
- Location: 272-336, 305-353 Nimble Hill Rd., Newington, New Hampshire
- Coordinates: 43°5′58″N 70°50′0″W
- Area: 161 acres (65 ha)
- Built by: Multiple
- Architectural style: Federal
- NRHP reference No.: 87002106 (original); 91000665 (increase)

Significant dates
- Added to NRHP: November 30, 1987
- Boundary increase: December 9, 1991

The Newington Center Historic District encompasses the historic civic heart of Newington, New Hampshire. It consists of a section of Nimble Hill Road between its junction with Little Bay Road, and a gate at the southern end marking the start of territory formerly associated with Pease Air Force Base (now Portsmouth International Airport at Pease). This area includes the town common, laid out in 1640, a cluster of civic buildings, and several private residences, as well as remnants of the state's oldest town forest. The district was listed on the National Register of Historic Places in 1987; in 1991 an additional 69 acres (28 ha) of former town forest, now part of the airfield, were added to the district.

== Description and history ==
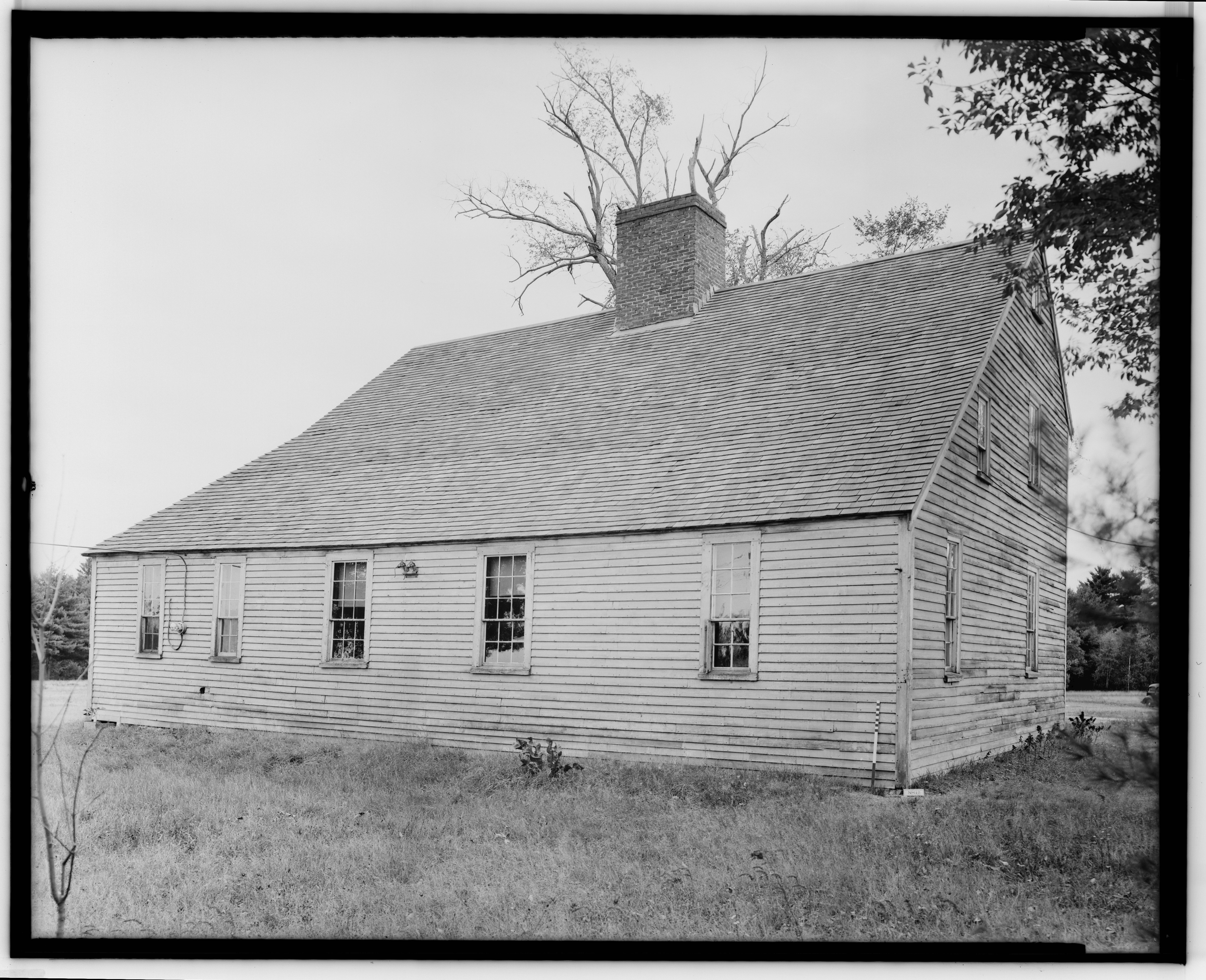
Newington's Old Parsonage (1710), one of the oldest buildings in New Hampshire

The town of Newington was originally settled in the 17th century as part of Dover. It was set off as a separate parish in 1712, and incorporated as a separate town in 1713. Its historic town center's origins date to 1640, when common land was set aside by the town. Some of this became the town center area, and a larger part (eventually reaching more than 100 acres (40 ha) in size) was at some point designated as the town forest.

The town center is clustered along a section of Nimble Hill Road, a historic north-south route between Dover and Portsmouth, and is also passed just to the north by a historic alignment of the Old Boston Post Road, connecting Boston, Massachusetts, to points in what is now Maine. The north-south road was truncated at its southern end by the construction of Pease Air Force Base in the 1950s, which also greatly reduced the town forest's size. One of the center's focal points is the Congregational Church, a structure built in 1712 and extensively altered in 1835, giving it its present Greek Revival appearance. Newington's Old Parsonage (1710) and Newington Meeting House (1717) are some of the oldest buildings in New Hampshire.

== See also ==
- National Register of Historic Places listings in Rockingham County, New Hampshire
