= Beaufort Academy =

School in South Carolina, United States

Location
- 240 Sams Point Road; Beaufort, South Carolina 29907; United States; 32°26′18.636″N 80°38′21.8832″W

Information
- Type: Private
- Established: 1966 (60 years ago)
- CEEB code: 410118
- Principal: Carol Ann Richards
- Enrollment: 309
- Campus size: 24 acres (9.7 ha)
- Colors: Navy, Columbia Blue, and white
- Mascot: Eagle
- Website: www.beaufortacademy.org
- Last updated: 15 August 2020

Beaufort Academy (BA) is a Pre-K through 12 independent school located in Lady's Island, South Carolina, United States. Beaufort Academy is a member of the South Carolina Independent School Association (SCISA), a school accrediting organization that was founded in 1965 to legitimize segregation academies. As of 1982, the school had never had a Black student, insisting that none had ever applied.

== History ==
Beaufort Academy was founded in 1965 on Lady's Island, South Carolina. It was established as a segregation academy in response to the court-ordered integration of public schools. The school's tax exemption was revoked by the Internal Revenue Service after it declined to document that it had a racially nondiscriminatory admissions policy. While many White politicians portrayed their opposition to school integration as a reaction to busing, some pupils at Beaufort Academy were bused as far as 120 miles per day in order to attend the all-White school.

== Demographics ==
In the 2021-2022 school year, the most recent year available, Beaufort Academy did not report demographic information to the National Center for Education Statistics. The school had an enrollment of 309 students in grades PK-12. There were 54.9 teachers on a full-time equivalent basis, for a student to teacher ratio of 5.6.

== Athletics ==
BA is a member of SCISA. The teams are nicknamed the Eagles.
