= Beaufort, South Carolina =

- City
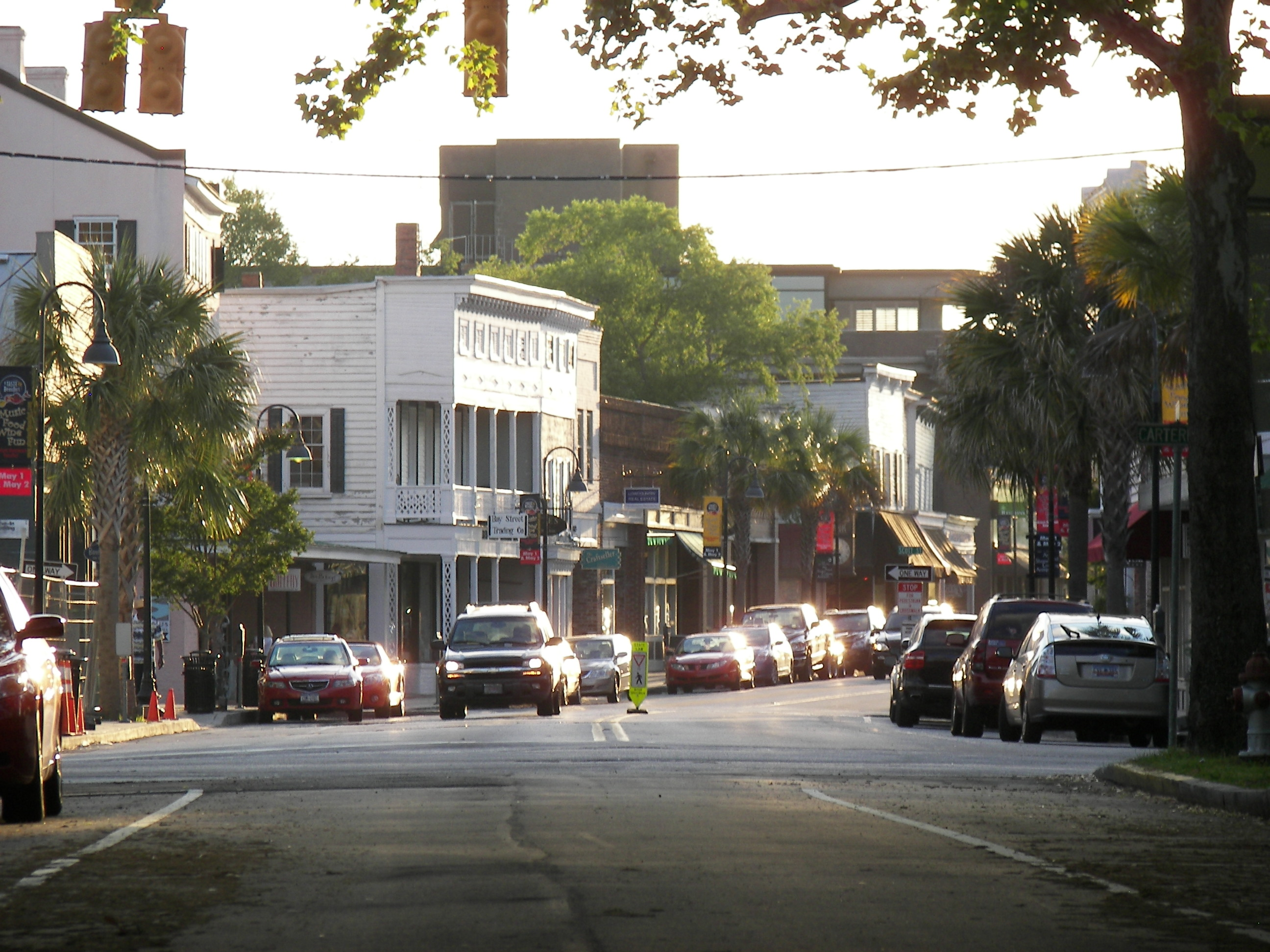
- Bay Street, Downtown Beaufort

- Seal
- Interactive map of Beaufort, South Carolina
- Location within South Carolina Location within the United States
- Coordinates: 32°26′N 80°41′W
- Country: United States
- State: South Carolina
- County: Beaufort
- Incorporated: 1711
- Named for: Henry Somerset, 2nd Duke of Beaufort

Area
  - City: 25.32 sq mi (65.58 km^{2})
  - Land: 24.43 sq mi (63.28 km^{2})
  - Water: 0.88 sq mi (2.29 km^{2})
- Elevation: 20 ft (6.1 m)

Population (2020)
  - City: 13,607
  - Density: 556.9/sq mi (215.01/km^{2})
  - Urban: 52,515 (US: 487th)
  - Urban density: 1,200/sq mi (463.3/km^{2})
- Time zone: UTC−5 (Eastern (EST))
  - Summer (DST): UTC−4 (EDT)
- ZIP codes: 29901-29907
- Area codes: 843, 854
- FIPS code: 45-04690
- GNIS feature ID: 2403832
- Website: cityofbeaufort.org

Beaufort (/ˈbjuːfərt/ BEW-fərt) is a city in Beaufort County, South Carolina, United States, and its county seat. Chartered in 1711, it is the second-oldest city in South Carolina, behind Charleston. The city's population was 13,607 at the 2020 census. It is part of the Hilton Head Island metropolitan area.

Beaufort is located on Port Royal Island, in the heart of the Sea Islands and South Carolina Lowcountry. The city is widely known for its scenic location and for preserving the historic character of its antebellum architecture. The prominent role of Beaufort and the surrounding Sea Islands during the Reconstruction era after the U.S. Civil War is memorialized by the Reconstruction Era National Monument, established in 2017. The city is also known for its proximity to the military facilities at Parris Island, a U.S. naval hospital, and the Marine Corps Air Station Beaufort.

== History ==
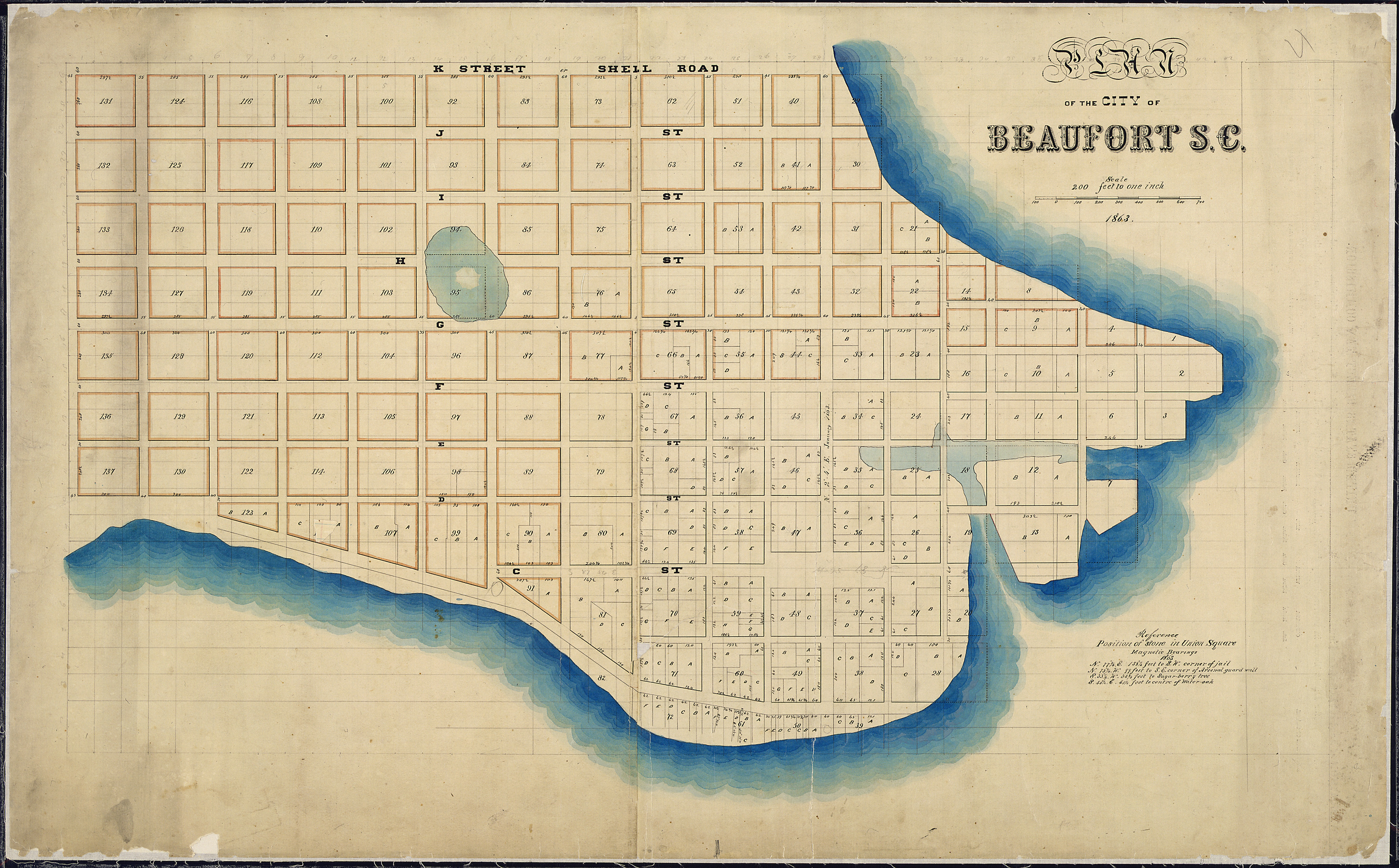
Plan of the City of Beaufort, S.C., as allotted by U.S. Tax Commissioners for the District of South Carolina, February 1863

Written history began 500 years ago with the exploration of the area by Spanish Captain Pedro de Salazar between 1514 and 1516. Nearby, the colony of Santa Elena was having problems by 1566, when a group of potential settlers sailed from northwest Iberia and the Spanish governor of Floritda, Acinega, dispatched under Captain Pardo and 250 men to reinforce the colony.

The Lowcountry region had been subject to numerous European explorations and failed attempts at colonization before British colonists founded Beaufort in 1711. Beaufort was named for Henry Somerset, 2nd Duke of Beaufort. The city grew slowly at first due to attacks from Native American tribes and threats from the Spanish Empire to the south. It flourished first as a center for shipbuilding and later, when the region was established as a slave society, as the elite center for the Lowcountry planters through the Civil War.

Several months after hostilities began, Beaufort was occupied by Union forces following the Battle of Port Royal. Due to its early occupation, the city attracted escaping slaves. The Union declared the slaves emancipated and initiated efforts at education and preparation for full independence. The Freedmen's Bureau worked with local blacks during Reconstruction.

After the war, the city relied on phosphate mining before a devastating hurricane in 1893 and a fire in 1907 brought extensive destruction and economic turmoil. Their effects slowed growth of the city for nearly half a century.

In the latter half of the 20th century, the community became a popular tourist destination. Beaufort also benefited from the growth of military installations in the area and related employment. Local groups have worked to preserve Beaufort's historic character and significant architecture. These efforts have contributed to the community regularly receiving accolades in regional and national media for its general attractiveness and quality of life.

In 2022, an informal sister city arrangement was established with Ostroh, Ukraine in which the residents of Beaufort raised funds to support Ostroh during the Russian invasion of Ukraine.

In addition to the Beaufort Historic District, The Anchorage, William Barnwell House, Barnwell-Gough House, Beaufort National Cemetery, John A. Cuthbert House, Fort Lyttelton Site, Hunting Island State Park Lighthouse, Laurel Bay Plantation, Marshlands, Seacoast Packing Company, Seaside Plantation, Robert Smalls House, Tabby Manse and John Mark Verdier House are listed on the National Register of Historic Places.

== Geography ==
The majority of the city is situated upon Port Royal Island, an interior Sea Island that the city shares with neighboring Port Royal and unincorporated portions of Beaufort County. The city has also annexed lands across the Beaufort River on Lady's Island.

The city is amid a marshy estuary, and according to the United States Census Bureau has a total area of 33.6 square miles (87.0 km^{2}), of which 27.6 square miles (71.5 km^{2}) is land and 6.0 square miles (15.5 km^{2}), or 17.80%, is water.

== Climate ==
Beaufort has a humid subtropical climate with warm winters by South Carolina standards.

Climate data for Beaufort, South Carolina (Marine Corps Air Station Beaufort) 1991–2020 normals, extremes 1945–present
Month	Jan	Feb	Mar	Apr	May	Jun	Jul	Aug	Sep	Oct	Nov	Dec	Year
Record high °F (°C)	83 (28)	87 (31)	91 (33)	94 (34)	103 (39)	106 (41)	106 (41)	103 (39)	98 (37)	94 (34)	88 (31)	82 (28)	106 (41)
Mean maximum °F (°C)	76 (24)	79 (26)	84 (29)	88 (31)	94 (34)	97 (36)	98 (37)	97 (36)	93 (34)	87 (31)	82 (28)	77 (25)	100 (38)
Mean daily maximum °F (°C)	60.3 (15.7)	63.7 (17.6)	69.9 (21.1)	77.0 (25.0)	84.0 (28.9)	88.9 (31.6)	91.8 (33.2)	90.3 (32.4)	85.7 (29.8)	78.1 (25.6)	69.3 (20.7)	62.7 (17.1)	76.8 (24.9)
Daily mean °F (°C)	50.2 (10.1)	53.3 (11.8)	59.3 (15.2)	66.5 (19.2)	74.2 (23.4)	80.1 (26.7)	83.2 (28.4)	82.2 (27.9)	77.6 (25.3)	68.6 (20.3)	58.8 (14.9)	52.8 (11.6)	67.2 (19.6)
Mean daily minimum °F (°C)	40.1 (4.5)	42.8 (6.0)	48.7 (9.3)	56.0 (13.3)	64.3 (17.9)	71.3 (21.8)	74.5 (23.6)	74.1 (23.4)	69.5 (20.8)	59.0 (15.0)	48.4 (9.1)	42.9 (6.1)	57.9 (14.4)
Mean minimum °F (°C)	25 (−4)	28 (−2)	32 (0)	42 (6)	51 (11)	63 (17)	69 (21)	68 (20)	59 (15)	44 (7)	33 (1)	28 (−2)	23 (−5)
Record low °F (°C)	5 (−15)	16 (−9)	21 (−6)	32 (0)	41 (5)	51 (11)	62 (17)	57 (14)	45 (7)	31 (−1)	19 (−7)	11 (−12)	5 (−15)
Average precipitation inches (mm)	2.90 (74)	2.91 (74)	3.11 (79)	3.06 (78)	2.50 (64)	4.99 (127)	5.57 (141)	6.50 (165)	4.03 (102)	3.77 (96)	2.51 (64)	3.17 (81)	45.02 (1,144)
Average precipitation days (≥ 0.01 in)	9.2	8.9	9.2	8.5	8.4	12.5	12.6	12.9	10.1	8.2	7.8	9.6	117.9
Source: NOAA

== Neighborhoods ==
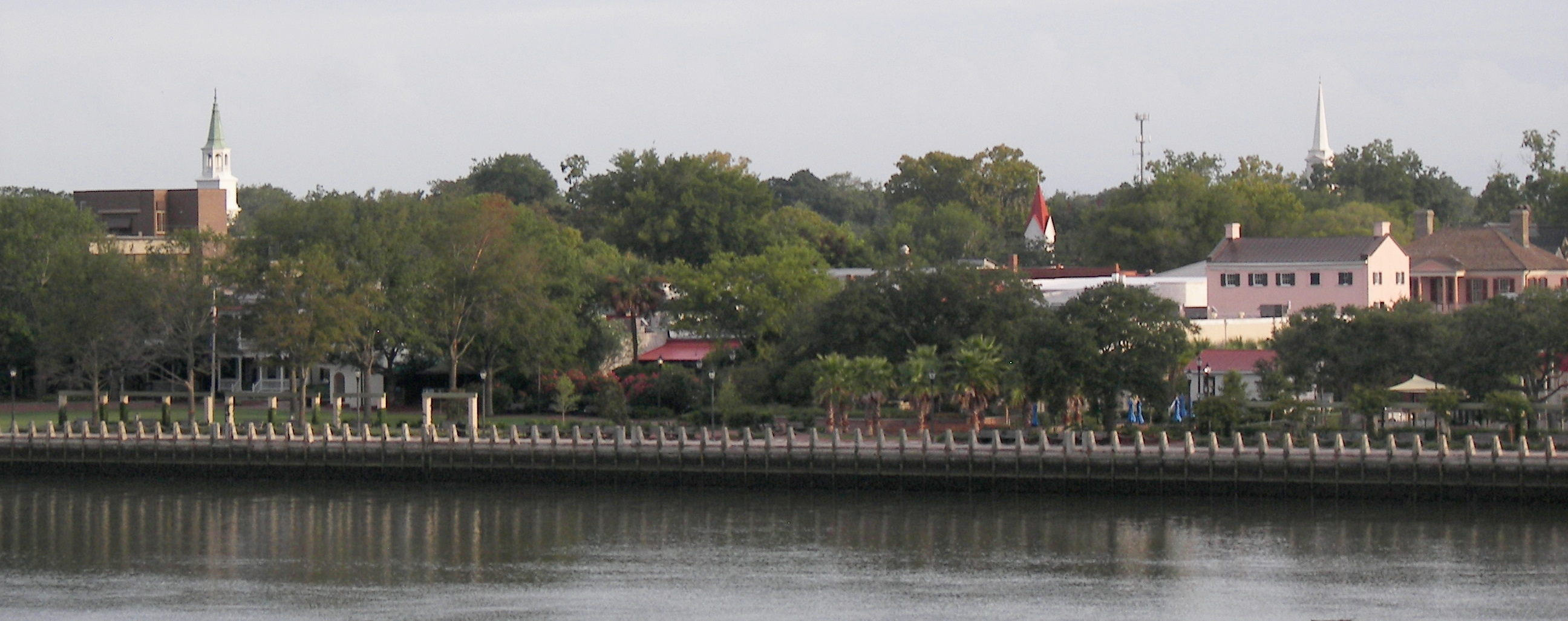
Downtown Beaufort as seen from the Richard V. Woods Memorial Bridge

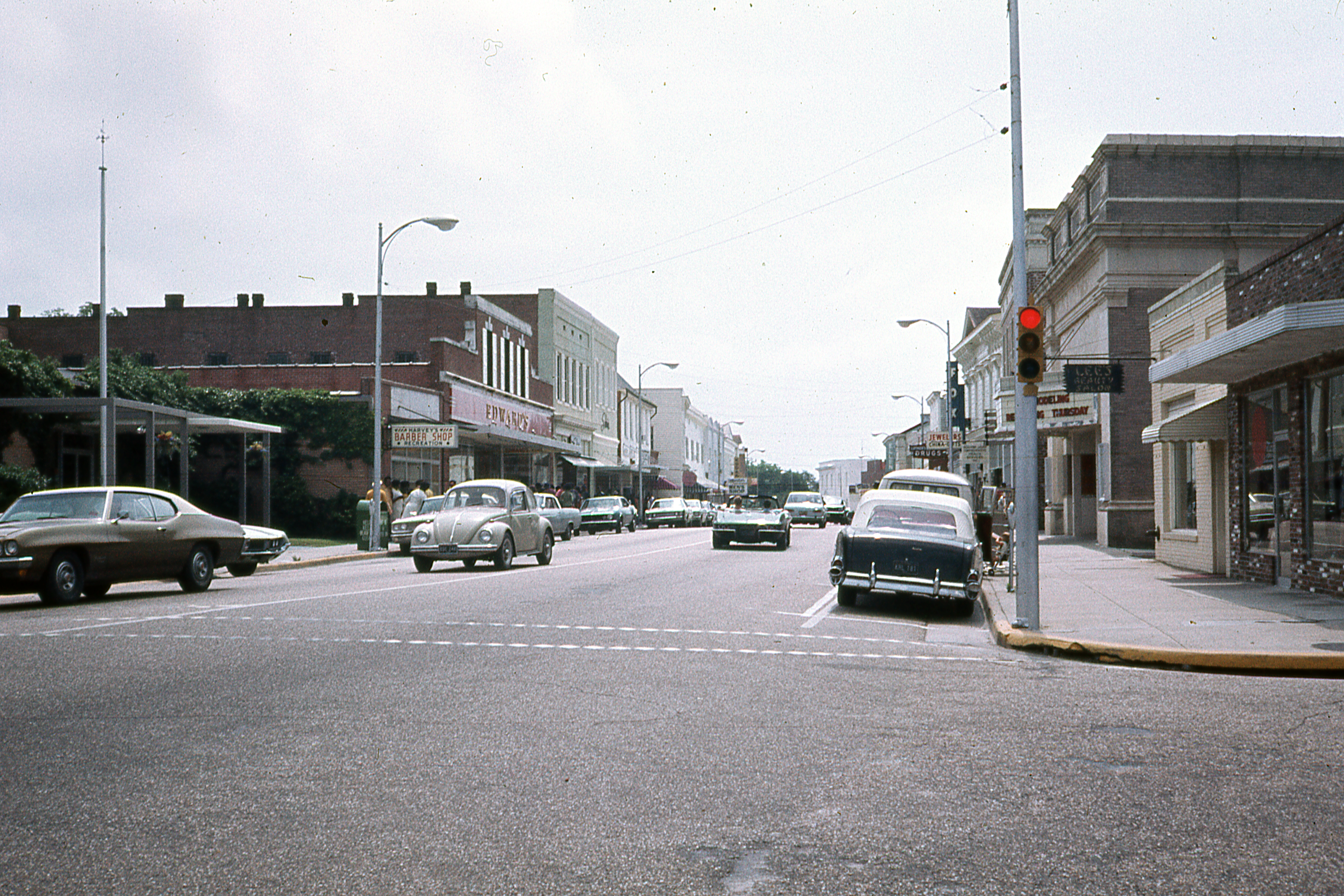
Downtown Beaufort on Bay Street, 1972

=== Historic District ===
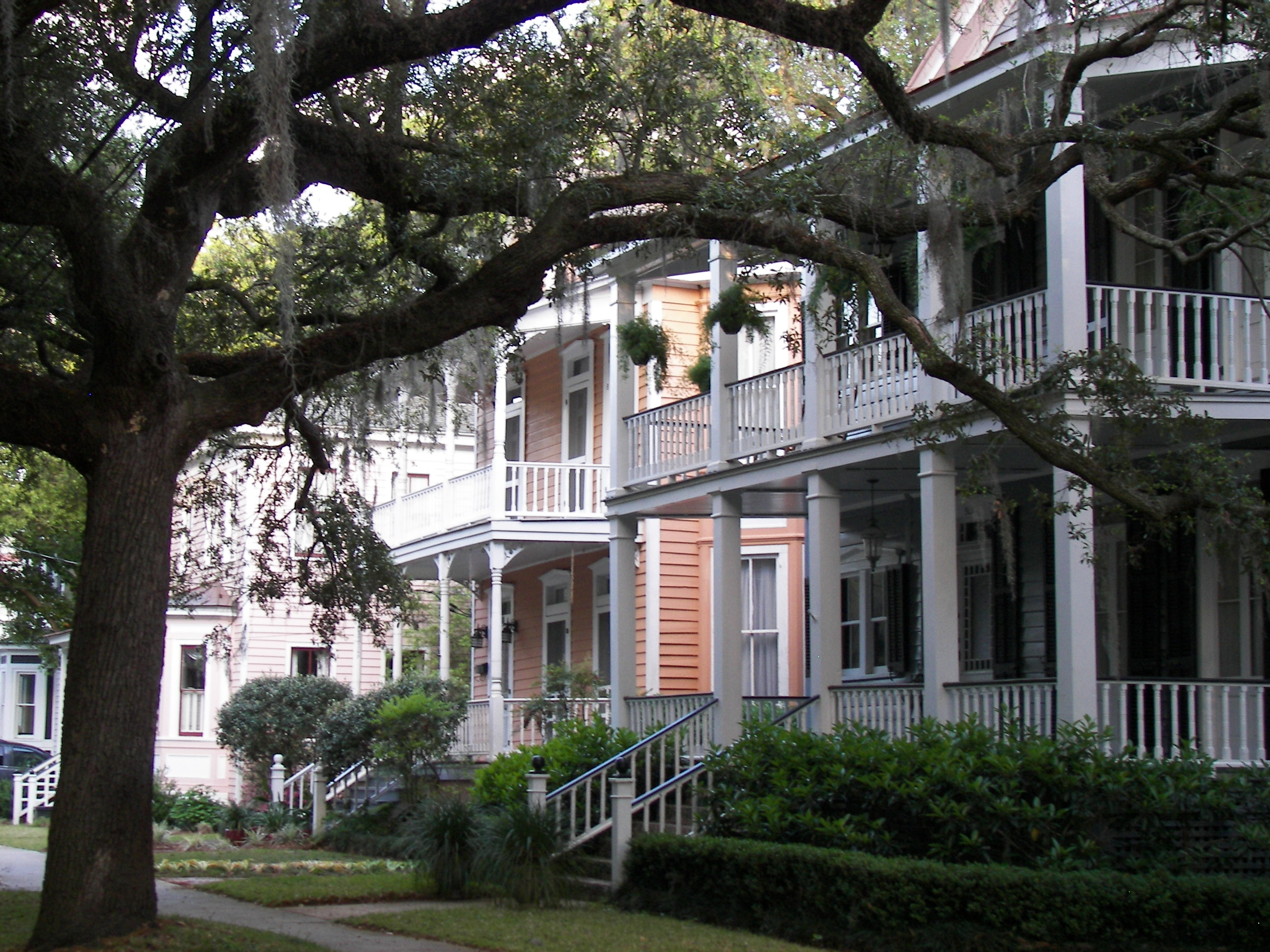
Homes in the Old Point neighborhood

Remnants of the original English colonial settlement of Beaufort can be found in the downtown or historic district area. 304 acres (1.23 km^{2}) of the town have been designated a National Historic Landmark. With approximate dimensions, downtown is defined as anything upon the peninsula jutting into the Beaufort River that is located east of Ribaut Road (US 21). Further defined, downtown is broken into five distinct historic neighborhoods: Downtown (the commercial core), The Point (also known as the Old Point), The Bluff, The Old Commons, and the Northwest Quadrant.

=== Other residential areas ===
As the city expanded in the 20th century, additional growth focused on previously undeveloped areas north and west of the historic district. Much of the growth can be attributed to the increased military influence during the 1940s and 1950s, in which Beaufort's population doubled as a result of new military personnel and families moving to the area. These areas have become integral parts of the city and today are home to the majority of the residents in the city.

The Pigeon Point and Higginsonville neighborhoods are located immediately north of Downtown Beaufort and are built around the Beaufort National Cemetery. They contain two major city parks: Pigeon Point Community Park and the Basil Green Recreation Complex. An area with smaller homes and mostly one-story early 20th century structures, Pigeon Point has experienced a renewal of development interest, with many homes being "flipped" or renovated in recent years. Higginsonville is more similar in character to the Northwest Quadrant neighborhood and has its street names come from famous abolitionists during the Civil War era.

The West End and Depot neighborhoods are located west of Ribaut Road, south of Boundary Street and north of the Technical College of the Lowcountry campus. These areas have been the focus of recent redevelopment efforts. Formerly concentrated around the Beaufort rail station (the depot), the neighborhoods have similar characteristics to the Pigeon Point area and have a sizable number of military families as residents.

The Spanish Point neighborhood is located between Downtown and Mossy Oaks, generally considered to be clustered around the Technical College of the Lowcountry campus and the Beaufort Memorial Hospital. Several upscale residential streets are found in this area.

The Battery Creek neighborhoods of Mossy Oaks, Royal Oaks, First Boulevard, and Cottage Farms form the southern residential areas of the city and are generally considered to be south of the Technical College of the Lowcountry campus and the Beaufort Memorial Hospital. There are some commercial establishments in the area in addition to residential subdivisions ranging from self-contained attached housing to residential estate lots of 0.5 acres (2,000 m^{2}).

Portions of Lady's Island have been annexed by Beaufort, but the city does not have complete jurisdiction of the entire island. Most of the incorporated areas are upscale residential communities. Both Beaufort High School and the Beaufort County Airport are located on the island.

=== Other non-residential areas ===
Once the outer edge of town, the areas along Boundary Street (US Highway 21), the Robert Smalls Parkway (SC Highway 170), and Ribaut Road now serve as Beaufort's major commercial corridors. Several major shopping centers and dining establishments are prevalent in all three areas. Beyond shopping and dining, Ribaut Road has numerous medical offices clustered near Beaufort Memorial Hospital. Boundary Street and Robert Smalls Parkway have several lodging facilities and auto dealerships as prevailing business types. Boundary Street is expected to change its appearance over the coming years due in part to a major redevelopment plan approved by the city in 2008 and supported via tax increment financing.

Uptown Beaufort refers to a series of mostly commercial properties along Boundary Street that separates the historic district from the Pigeon Point neighborhood. Uptown is not formally considered a neighborhood on its own, yet merchants have created a unique identity to market the commercial area separately from downtown merchants clustered on Bay Street.

Beaufort Town Center is a recent term given to a series of developments along Boundary Street located west of the historic district and Pigeon Point that is clustered near the Beaufort County government complex and the City of Beaufort's municipal complex construction site. Though much of the area (and the term) is owned by a single developer, many of Beaufort's commercial properties and administrative uses have moved to this area.

The Marine Corps Air Station Beaufort was annexed into the city in the 1990s, expanding the city limits northward near the unincorporated Seabrook community. Previous attempts at bringing large-scale residential development north of the air station were defeated after protests from long-time citizens and environmental advocacy groups.

== Demographics ==
Historical population
Census	Pop.	Note	%±
1850	879		—
1870	1,739		—
1880	2,549		46.6%
1890	3,587		40.7%
1900	4,110		14.6%
1910	2,486		−39.5%
1920	2,831		13.9%
1930	2,776		−1.9%
1940	3,185		14.7%
1950	5,081		59.5%
1960	6,298		24.0%
1970	9,434		49.8%
1980	8,634		−8.5%
1990	9,576		10.9%
2000	12,789		33.6%
2010	12,361		−3.3%
2020	13,607		10.1%
2025 (est.)	15,775	▲	15.9%
U.S. Decennial Census

Beaufort first appeared in the 1850 U.S. Census. The city recorded a population of 879, excluding slaves, which were not separately returned.

=== 2020 census ===
As of the 2020 census, Beaufort had a population of 13,607. The median age was 35.6 years. 18.0% of residents were under the age of 18 and 20.8% of residents were 65 years of age or older. For every 100 females there were 109.6 males, and for every 100 females age 18 and over there were 109.8 males age 18 and over.

98.0% of residents lived in urban areas, while 2.0% lived in rural areas.

There were 5,223 households in Beaufort, of which 26.9% had children under the age of 18 living in them. Of all households, 41.5% were married-couple households, 17.4% were households with a male householder and no spouse or partner present, and 36.6% were households with a female householder and no spouse or partner present. About 34.0% of all households were made up of individuals and 16.5% had someone living alone who was 65 years of age or older.

There were 5,947 housing units, of which 12.2% were vacant. The homeowner vacancy rate was 2.3% and the rental vacancy rate was 8.5%.

Racial composition as of the 2020 census
Race	Number	Percent
White	9,146	67.2%
Black or African American	2,791	20.5%
American Indian and Alaska Native	34	0.2%
Asian	256	1.9%
Native Hawaiian and Other Pacific Islander	25	0.2%
Some other race	282	2.1%
Two or more races	1,073	7.9%
Hispanic or Latino (of any race)	1,151	8.5%

=== 2010 census ===
At the 2010 census, there were 12,361 people living in the city. The population density was 447.9 per square mile . The racial makeup of the city was 67.1% White, 25.7% African American, 0.3% Native American, 1.4% Asian, 0.1% Pacific Islander, 1.98% from other races, and 2.6% from two or more races. Hispanic or Latino people of any race were 6.7% of the population.

=== 2000 census ===
At the 2000 census, there were 4,598 households, of which 31.8% had children under the age of 18 living with them, 47.6% were married couples living together, 14.9% had a female householder with no husband present, and 34.0% were non-families. 28.6% of all households were made up of individuals, and 10.2% had someone living alone who was 65 years of age or older. The average household size was 2.37 and the average family size was 2.90.

21.6% of the population were under the age of 18, 19.5% from 18 to 24, 28.9% from 25 to 44, 17.8% from 45 to 64, and 12.2% who were 65 years of age or older. The median age was 30 years. For every 100 females, there were 114.3 males. For every 100 females age 18 and over, there were 117.6 males.

The median household income was $36,532 and the median family income was $42,894. Males had a median income of $22,465 versus $23,474 for females. The per capita income for the city was $20,501. About 11.5% of families and 13.0% of the population were below the poverty line, including 20.3% of those under age 18 and 11.1% of those age 65 or over.

Beaufort is the center of an urban cluster with an estimated population of nearly 70,000, comprising the city and its surrounding towns and unincorporated areas including Port Royal, Burton, Lady's Island, St. Helena Island, Dataw Island, Distant Island, Fripp Island, Harbor Island, Shell Point, Laurel Bay, Parris Island, Grays Hill, Sheldon, Seabrook, Dale, Lobeco, Gardens Corner, and portion of Yemassee.

Beaufort is also part of the larger Hilton Head Island-Bluffton-Beaufort, SC Metropolitan Statistical Area, which includes Beaufort and Jasper counties. As of 2012, the MSA estimated a year-round population of 193,882.

== Culture ==
=== Media ===
The Beaufort area has several printed publications. The daily newspaper The Beaufort Gazette is the oldest and most circulated newspaper of record in South Carolina and is the sister publication to the Bluffton-based Island Packet. There are two weekly print newspapers: The Island News and an alternative Lowcountry Weekly.

Several radio stations have transmission feeds originating or duplicating in Beaufort. One such station is WAGP, 88.7 FM, "The Light". There are other locations just outside the city, such as Parris Island. Beaufort has one local television station, WJWJ-TV (PBS). Beaufort is part of the Savannah, Georgia Designated Market Area, and additionally receives Charleston television stations.

=== Books and film ===
Beaufort has been the setting or the inspirational setting for several novels by long-time resident Pat Conroy and a popular filming location for major motion pictures, including The Big Chill, The Prince of Tides, The Great Santini, Forrest Gump, Something To Talk About and G.I. Jane. The "garden" in the title of John Berendt's non-fiction novel Midnight in the Garden of Good and Evil is Beaufort's Citizens Cemetery. The voodoo practitioner Minerva, based on Beaufort resident Valerie Boles, lives near the cemetery.

Lady's Island, the slave trade and the American Revolutionary War are the topics of an award-winning novel by the Canadian writer Lawrence Hill, The Book of Negroes (2007) (published in the US as Someone Knows My Name). It portrays the evacuation of Black Americans from Manhattan by the British after the Revolutionary War, as they had promised freedom to those enslaved by Patriots who joined their forces. The British transported more than 3,000 freedmen for resettlement to Nova Scotia, where they became known as Black Loyalists; others were taken to England and the Caribbean. The Book of Negroes is the record of names and origins of freedmen taken to Canada.

=== Tourism and events ===
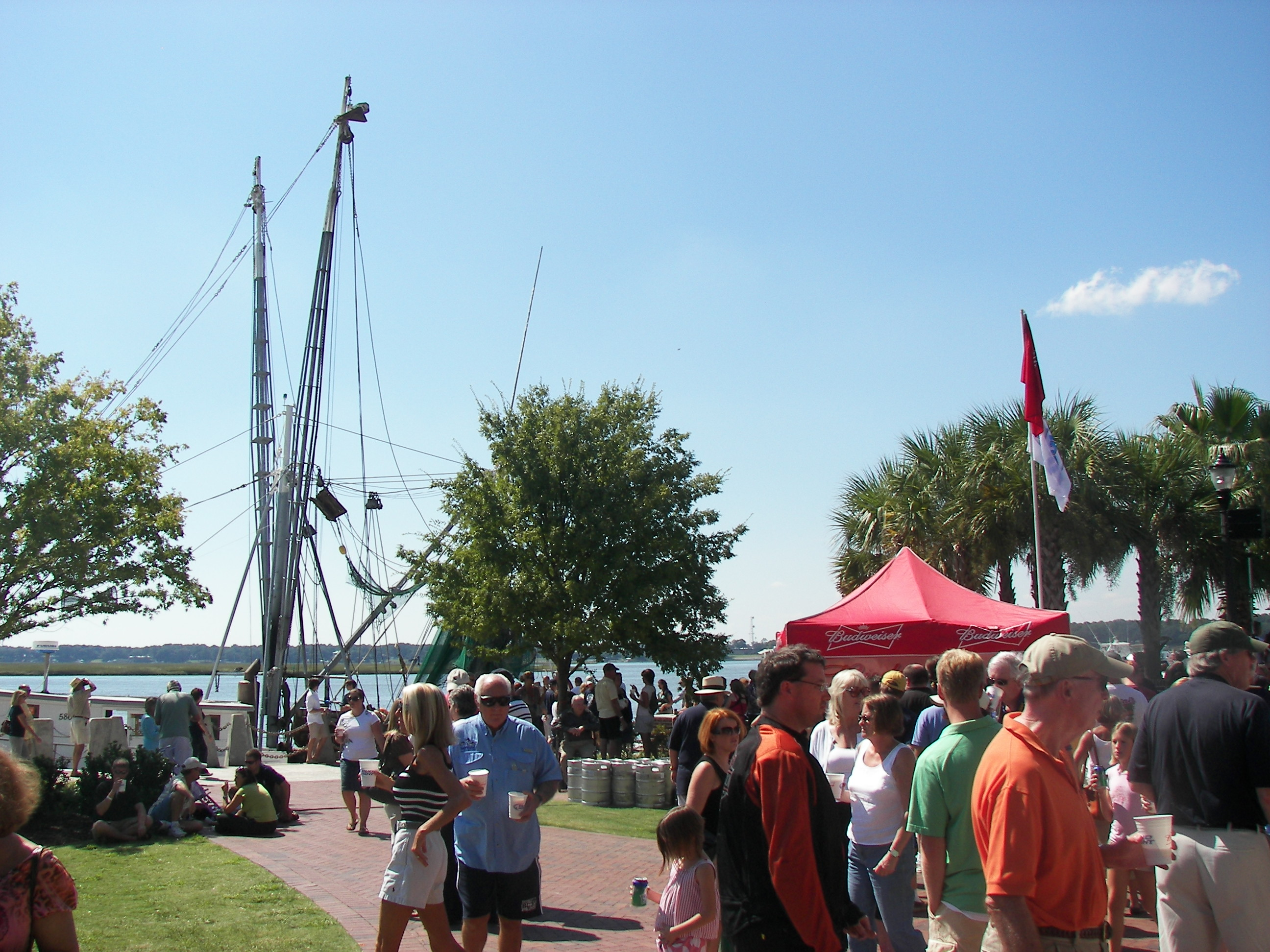
The Beaufort Shrimp Festival is one of several popular annual events in the Henry Chambers Waterfront Park.

Beaufort is a tourist destination known for its history. Major festivals and arts events include the Home Water Festival, a two-week festival in the middle of July; and the Shrimp Festival, celebrating the local and traditional industry, in the first weekend in October. In 2007, the Beaufort Shrimp Festival was selected as one of the Southeast Tourism Society's Top 20 Events.

The Beaufort International Film Festival held in mid-February each year (covers the Presidents' Day weekend) screens independent films. "A Taste of Beaufort", presented by Main Street Beaufort, is held on the first Saturday in May and features twenty local restaurants, fine wines, and live music. Historic Beaufort Foundation's Fall Tour of Homes and St. Helena's Spring Tour of Homes provide tours of the antebellum homes on the Point and local plantations. The town is also the home of The Kazoo Museum, which opened in October 2010 and is located in the Kazoobie Kazoos Factory. Hunting Island is nearby on the Atlantic Ocean and is the state's most visited state park.

=== The arts ===
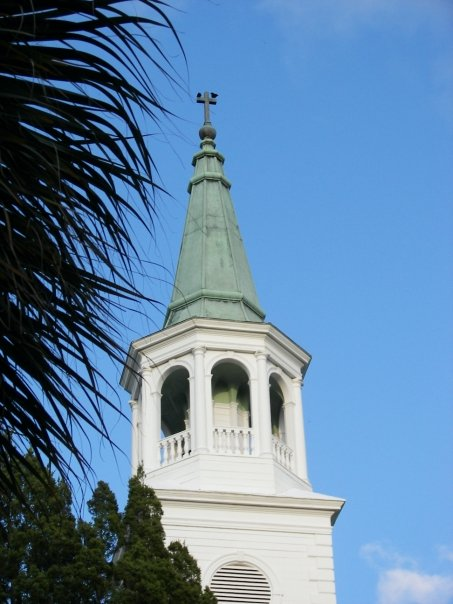
The steeple of the Parish Church of St. Helena

Beaufort has been named by some sources as one of "America's Best Art Towns", including being ranked the No. 14 Small City Arts Destination by American Style Magazine in 2008 and one of America's top 100 art towns by author John Villani in his 2005 book The 100 Best Art Towns in America: A Guide to Galleries, Museums, Festivals, Lodging and Dining. Close to 20 galleries operate within the city, with hundreds of local residents contributing to the arts scene.

The University of South Carolina Beaufort has a performing arts center.

The Arts Council of Beaufort, Port Royal and the Sea Island supports the arts via ARTworks, its 12,000-square-foot (1,100 m^{2}) community arts center, theater, and gallery in Beaufort Town Center (2127 Boundary Street) that also includes the studios of working artists, Strings 'n Things music shop, and spaces for workshops, classes, and conferences, as well as an after-school program. The arts council promotes the arts with original theater productions, community arts grants, and arts events county-wide.

=== Sports and recreation ===
Through Beaufort County's Recreation Department, junior and intramural athletics are sponsored year-round. Team activities include football, basketball, baseball, softball, soccer, and cheerleading. Several recreational facilities, including tennis courts, playgrounds, and ballfields exist within the city and in surrounding areas.

The local area provides excellent opportunities for watersports and boating. In February 2008, Field and Stream Magazine rated Beaufort as one of the top 20 fishing towns in the United States in an article that factored in cost, attractions, distractions, seasons, and fishing action. Beaufort was named as a "Top 50 Adventure Town" and the No. 7 Waterfront Adventure Town by National Geographic Adventure.

=== Religion ===
The city is home to many Christian denominations, with several churches located downtown and throughout the area. The Parish Church of St. Helena, founded in downtown Beaufort in 1712 as the established church, is the oldest church in the city. Other churches of note include Community Bible Church, The Baptist Church of Beaufort, Tabernacle Baptist Church, Carteret Street United Methodist Church, First Presbyterian Church, First Scots Presbyterian Church of Beaufort, Church of Jesus Christ of Latter-day Saints, First African Baptist Church, and St. Peter's Catholic Church, all with extensive histories and renowned architecture. Beaufort's Jewish community dates back to the 18th century, and Beth Israel Congregation is a historic Conservative synagogue in the downtown area. Additional places of worship include the St. James Orthodox Church (a mission church of the Orthodox Church in America) and the Unitarian Universalist Fellowship of Beaufort.

== Economy ==
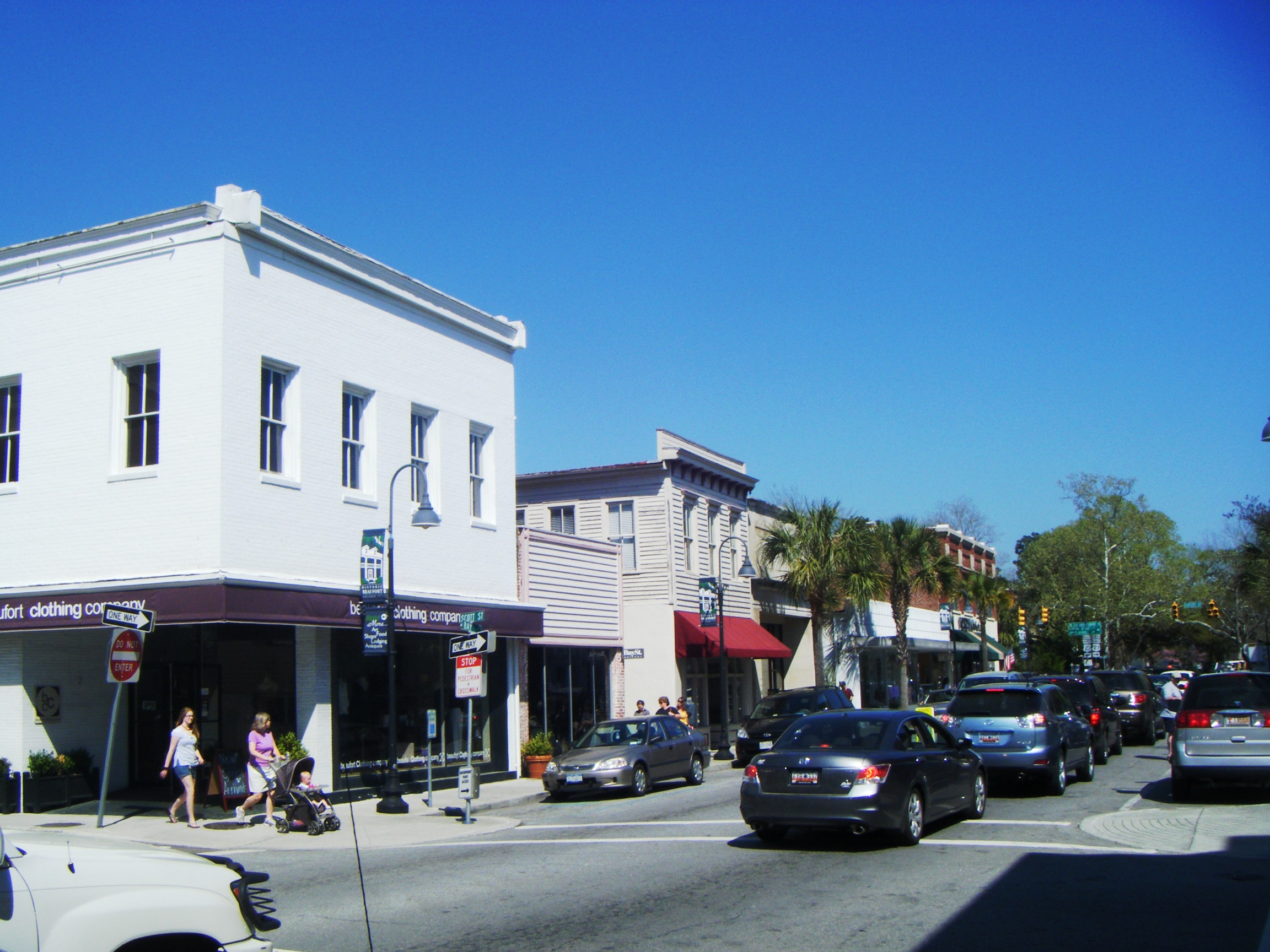
Downtown businesses clustered along Bay Street, adjacent to the Henry Chambers Waterfront Park

The proximity of the city to other fast-growing areas including Hilton Head Island and Bluffton as well as good access to Savannah, Georgia, the Savannah/Hilton Head International Airport, and a container port on the Savannah River make the city a desirable choice for residential and business development opportunity.

Beaufort has several geographic areas of economic activity. The downtown area is the historical center of commerce and is now primarily focused towards visitors, tourists. Much of the day-to-day service businesses for locals has moved along the Boundary Street corridor, the Robert Smalls Parkway corridor, or towards Lady's Island. There are several areas with limited industrial uses that exist primarily in the northwestern sections of the city, close to the intersection of Boundary Street with Robert Smalls Parkway.

The largest economic sector in Beaufort is the military presence in and around the community. Having supplanted agriculture and aquaculture in the last decades of the 20th century, Beaufort's military bases employ thousands of jobs directly and indirectly related to base operations and pump millions of dollars into the local economy. As a result, economic downturns do not hit the community as hard as in other similarly sized communities.

Due in part to its attractive location and deep connections with history and culture, the tourism and hospitality industry is also a major economic sector. Nearly 2 million visitors a year come to Beaufort and the Sea Islands of northern Beaufort County, with spring and fall seasons being peak times. The primary attractions of these visitors include golf and beach vacations, history, water sports, and local arts and crafts. As a result, Beaufort is home to many accommodation options ranging from upscale bed-and-breakfasts in the downtown area to standard motels and inns along Boundary Street. There are several dozen dining establishments in the city that cater to locals and tourists alike.

One of the areas larger employers is Beaufort Memorial Hospital (BMH), a 197-bed, non-profit hospital on the banks of the Atlantic Intracoastal Waterway. An acute-care hospital and regional referral center, it is the largest medical facility between Charleston, South Carolina, and Savannah, Georgia.

Other sectors of note are agriculture/aquaculture, local government, and retail.

== Government ==
Beaufort is classified as a city according to the South Carolina Secretary of State. The city is governed by a five-member city council under the council-manager form of government. The Mayor is Phil Cromer. The other council members include Mike McFee, Josh Scallate, Neil Lipsitz and Mitch Mitchell. Council members serve on staggered four-year terms. The day-to-day operations are handled through a city manager and city staff. The city manager is Scott Marshall.

In October 2007, voters approved $15 million in bonds to finance two new municipal buildings at the intersection of Boundary Street and Ribaut Road to replace aging and cramped facilities. In 2008, a new police headquarters and courthouse was opened. A new city hall at the intersection of Boundary Street and Ribaut Road opened shortly thereafter. The City of Beaufort owns or leases additional facilities throughout the city and provides police, fire, parks, planning, and other governmental functions. Water, sewer, sanitation, recycling, and landscaping services are outsourced to local companies.

Recent trends have shown Beaufort to seek closer inter-governmental cooperation with neighboring jurisdictions, especially in community and regional planning. Beaufort and Port Royal appoint members to a joint planning commission to hear cases in both jurisdictions. Both municipalities have expressed interests in collaborating with Beaufort County on regional planning initiatives.

== Education ==
=== Schools ===
Public education for grades Pre-Kindergarten through grade 12 is administered by the Beaufort County School District (BCSD) for all areas not on a military base. This district was established in the 1860s and legally completed desegregation in 1970. There are also several private schools located in the city and surrounding area. Schoolchildren in the city attend the following public and private schools:

Elementary schools	Middle schools	High schools	Charter schools	Private schools
Beaufort Elementary School	Beaufort Middle School	Battery Creek High School	Riverview Charter School	Agape Christian Academy
Broad River Elementary School	Lady's Island Middle School	Beaufort High School	Lowcountry Montessori	Beaufort Academy (Lady's Island)
Coosa Elementary School	Robert Smalls Middle School	Whale Branch Early College High School	Bridges Preparatory School	Beaufort Christian School
Joseph Shanklin Elementary School	Whale Branch Middle School	Beaufort-Jasper Academy for Career Excellence		St. Peter's Catholic School
Lady's Island Elementary School				Eleanor Christensen Montessori School
Port Royal Elementary School				Holy Trinity Classical Christian School
Mossy Oaks				
Whale Branch Elementary School				

The Beaufort Marine Corps Air Station has its own system at the elementary school level, which applies to the children of Department of Defense employees who are living in the permanent base housing and children of civilians working for the United States federal government who are living in the permanent base housing. The Department of Defense Education Activity (DoDEA) has two schools covering elementary and middle school for the base: Elliott Elementary School (PreKindergarten-Grade 2) and Bolden Elementary/Middle School (grades 3–8). High school students on the base go to the county school district, with Battery Creek HS as the zoned high school. BCSD does not specify a zoned elementary school for MCAS Beaufort, but it does designate Smalls IA as the zoned middle school for MCAS Beaufort.

=== Higher education ===
Three local institutions comprise the current extent of higher education in the Beaufort area. Both the University of South Carolina Beaufort North Campus (Founding Campus) and the Technical College of the Lowcountry Main Campus are located within the city limits. Clemson University also operates a university extension office in the city with ecological and agricultural programs.

=== Libraries and museums ===
The Beaufort area has close to 70 sites listed on the National Register of Historic Places, in addition to the downtown area being listed as a historic district. The John Mark Verdier House at 901 Bay Street is the only home in the city open year-round to the public that is listed on the National Register of Historic Places.

Located in downtown, the Beaufort County Library serves residents of Beaufort and northern Beaufort County. Additional branches are found elsewhere in the county. The University of South Carolina Beaufort also has a campus library, located in the original Beaufort College building.

== Infrastructure ==
=== Major roads ===
The following thoroughfares are important transportation links in Beaufort.

US 21 is a major connector for the city and the principal route to the Sea Islands. It is also known as Trask Parkway, Parris Island Gateway, Ribaut Road (in Port Royal) and Lady's Island Drive. Originally going through downtown and across the Robert Woods Memorial Bridge, US 21 was rerouted to the south upon the completion of the taller and wider J.E. McTeer Bridge in the 1980s and was re-routed in 2012 to help steer Sea Islands traffic around Beaufort. US 21 is the major hurricane evacuation route for the area.

US 21 Bus., also known locally as "Business 21", is the major arterial through downtown Beaufort. Starting at the US 21 split at Parris Island Gateway, the 5.4-mile (8.7 km) route travels eastward along Boundary Street to the Bellamy Curve at the edge of the peninsula, then turns sharply toward the south along Carteret Street until reaching the Richard V. Woods Memorial Bridge over the Beaufort River. The route continues onto Lady's Island before terminating at an intersection with US 21 and SC 802.

SC 116 (Laurel Bay Road) connects MCAS Beaufort with the military housing community at Laurel Bay and surrounding areas.

SC 170 (Robert T. Smalls Parkway) connects Beaufort with southern Beaufort County, Jasper County, and Savannah.

SC 281 (Ribaut Road) connects Beaufort and Port Royal.

SC 802 (Sams Point Road) connects Lady's Island with US 21 and US 21 Business.

Although not located within Beaufort's city limits, the following routes provide vital access to the city and are major evacuation routes in the event of a hurricane.

US 17 runs along the northern portion of Beaufort County as Trask Parkway between Interstate 95 exit 33 and U.S. Highway 21. This is also the primary route used between Beaufort and Charleston, as well as Walterboro and Yemassee.

I-95 is the closest interstate highway and is located about 25 miles (40 km) away.

=== Other transportation ===
Local public transportation and dial-a-ride service is provided by Palmetto Breeze, a regional transportation authority run by the Lowcountry Regional Transit Authority. Other transportation facilities include:

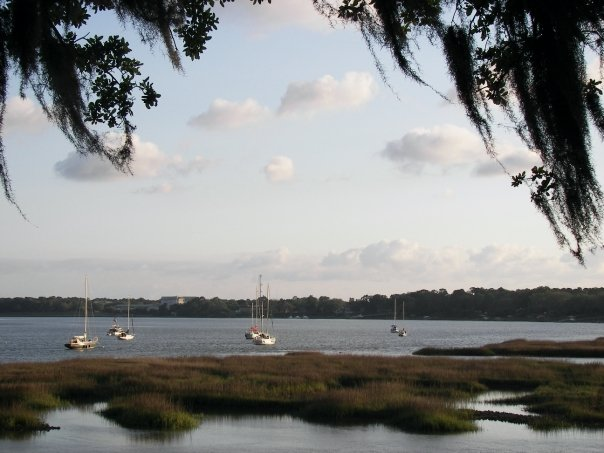
Beaufort is one of the most popular harbors on the Intracoastal Waterway.

- The Downtown Marina is Beaufort's nautical gateway to the Intracoastal Waterway and the surrounding Sea Islands. Additional marinas are located on Lady's Island and in Port Royal. Several boat landings exist in the city and in the surrounding areas.
- Greyhound operates an inter-city bus terminal, connecting Beaufort with the national Greyhound bus network.
- Beaufort County Airport, located three miles (5 km) east of downtown, on Lady's Island, provides general aviation services. The closest airports served by commercial carriers are found in Hilton Head Island, Charleston, and Savannah.
- The Port Royal Railroad served Beaufort and surrounding locales with freight rail service until the closing of the South Carolina Port Authority terminal just south of the city in 2004. The rail at one time also had passenger service and was used by Marine Corps recruits to reach Parris Island. The railroad tracks were removed in 2011 to make way for the Spanish Moss Trail, a rail trail that opened in 2012.

=== Utilities ===
Water and sewer services are provided by the Beaufort-Jasper Water and Sewer Authority (BJWSA), a regional utility agency. City trash and recycling pickup are coordinated by Waste Pro and are billed through BJWSA. Dominion Energy provides electricity and power services to the city. Charter, Hargray and CenturyLink provide telephone, digital, and cable television services to the city.

== Notable people ==
Actors, authors and entertainers

- Samuel Hopkins Adams, author
- Danni Ashe, adult entertainer
- Tom Berenger, actor
- Pat Conroy, author of numerous novels with several depicting communities resembling Beaufort
- Esther Dale, film actress
- Cool John Ferguson, blues guitarist, singer and songwriter
- Candice Glover, American Idol season 12 winner
- Jazzy Jay, hip-hop disc jockey
- Maude Odell, stage actress
- Terry Sweeney, actor
- Mary Scrimzeour Whitaker (1820–1906), author

Athletes

- Brendan Allen, UFC mixed martial artist
- Kevin Brooks, basketball, National Basketball Association and National Basketball League (Australia)
- C.J. Cummings, weightlifter
- Dee Delaney, football, cornerback, National Football League
- Lacey Evans, real name Macey Estrella, former professional wrestler in the WWE
- Joe Frazier, heavyweight boxing champion of the world, first man to beat Muhammad Ali
- Greg Jones, football, National Football League
- Ashley Lelie, football, National Football League and University of Hawaii wide receiver
- Ron Parker, football, safety, National Football League
- Naya Tapper, rugby, 2024 Olympic Bronze Medalist in Rugby Sevens
- Devin Taylor, football, National Football League and University of South Carolina defensive end

Politicians and leaders

- Robert Barnwell, former U.S. congressman
- Robert Woodward Barnwell, former U.S. and Confederate congressman
- Edward Junius Black, former U.S. congressman (represented Georgia)
- Alvin Brown, first African American mayor of Jacksonville, Florida
- William F. Colcock, former U.S. congressman
- Charles Craven, former governor and founder of Beaufort
- William Elliot, former U.S. congressman
- John Floyd, former U.S. congressman (represented Georgia)
- Richard Howell Gleaves, former Lieutenant Governor of South Carolina
- William J. Grayson, former U.S. congressman and poet
- Thomas Hutson Gregorie, physician and state politician
- W. Brantley Harvey Jr., state legislator and lawyer
- W. Brantley Harvey Sr., state legislator and lawyer
- Francis Lubbock, former governor of Texas
- Michael P. O'Connor, former U.S. congressman
- Libby Pataki, wife of former Governor of New York George Pataki
- Clementa C. Pinckney, assassinated state senator and pastor
- Robert Rhett, former U.S. congressman and leading secessionist politician
- Larry Ross, state legislator and officer of the United States Army
- Robert Smalls, former slave and Civil War hero who became one of the first African-Americans elected to the U.S. Congress
- William Verity, Jr., former U.S. Secretary of Commerce
- Marquetta L. Goodwine, Queen Quet, Chieftess of the Gullah Geechee Nation, an author, preservationist, speaker, and artist

Others

- Robert W. Barnwell, former Episcopal bishop, third Bishop of Alabama.
- Richard W. Colcock, former president of The Citadel
- Donald Conroy, former colonel, USMC; also known as "The Great Santini" and father of Pat Conroy
- Patricia Denkler, record setting woman aviator
- Stephen Elliott, former Episcopal bishop
- John Edwards Holbrook, former zoologist
- Leon Keyserling, economist and adviser to President Truman
- Anita Pollitzer, former photographer
- Anne Pressly, former news anchor whose murder in Arkansas attracted national attention

== See also ==
- Battle of Beaufort
- Beaufort Historic District
- Treaty of Beaufort
