= P. C. B. Newington =

P.C.B. Newington
- Born: 10 July 1888; Bedfordshire, England
- Died: 15 May 1964 (aged 75); Ipoh, Malaysia
- Education: Bedford Modern School

Philip Campbell Beatson Newington (1888–1964) was the author of a cookery book celebrating Malaysian food, something he conceived while starving as a prisoner of war at the Sime Road Camp in Singapore between 1942 and 1945. During his incarceration, Newington founded a Gourmet Club, Good Food, for him and his fellow prisoners; the club celebrated, in precise detail, cooking and eating imaginary meals. A book of his experience and the recipes remembered and created, Good Food, was published in 1947. Always curious of the culture of his adopted home he was, before and after World War II, a contributor to journals on his experiences of local customs.

== Life ==
Newington was baptised on 10 July 1888, the son of Charles Douglas Godfrey Newington and his wife, Frances Maria Newington. He was educated at Bedford Modern School.

Newington began his career in the Sarawak Service, becoming District officer amongst the Melanau at Mukah. He was curious about local culture and was a contributor to many journals during his time as an expatriate.

Newington later became a plantation owner in Sarawak and was a prisoner of war in Singapore between 1942 and 1945. He was initially interned at the Changi Prison where he witnessed the so-called Double Tenth incident and kept a notebook of his experience. After Changi he was transferred to the Sime Road Camp where he founded a gourmet club, Good Food, which celebrated cooking and eating imaginary meals. In her book, Wartime Kitchen, Hong Suen Wong explained that "revelling in the finer details of food and dining in a systematic way ... became a way for the prisoners to relieve their hunger and to sustain them psychologically". A book of Newington's experience in the prison of war camp, Good Food, was published in 1947.

In 1919 Newington married Valerie Murray Henderson. He was a prominent Rotarian and died in Ipoh on 15 May 1964.

== Selected work ==
- Good Food. Published by Charles Grenier, Ipoh, Malaysia
- Melanau Memories. Published by Sarawak Museum Journal, 1961
