= Not Your Average Joe's =

American-style restaurant chain

- Type: Private
- Industry: Restaurant
- Founded: 1994
- Founder: Steve Silverstein
- Headquarters: Quincy, Massachusetts, United States
- Number of locations: 14 (2025)
- Area served: Northeastern and Mid-Atlantic United States
- Key people: joeseph McGuire, Chairman and Chief Executive Officer
- Products: Casual dining, American cuisine
- Owner: Not Your Average Joe’s Inc.
- Website: notyouraveragejoes.com

Not Your Average Joe’s is an American casual dining restaurant chain headquartered in Milton, Massachusetts. Founded in 1994, the company currently operates 14 locations across the Northeastern and Mid-Atlantic regions of the United States. At its peak in the mid-2010s, the chain had over 27 locations across multiple states. Not Your Average Joe’s has undergone ownership changes and is currently privately held under the corporate name Not Your Average Joe’s Inc. The restaurants feature a standardized menu, offering seafood, sandwiches, pasta, and pizza.

== History ==
In 1900, Lithuanian immigrant Barnet Silverstein founded Silverstein's Clothing Store in Dartmouth, Massachusetts. Ownership of the store passed to his son, Harry Silverstein, and later to Harry’s three sons: Joe, Louis, and Bernard Silverstein. In 1975, Joe’s son, Steve Silverstein, began his career in public accounting in Boston and later worked as a chief financial officer in Aspen, Colorado. In 1993, he returned to his family’s business and identified a market gap for affordable dining in suburban New Bedford. Recognizing this opportunity, he founded the first Not Your Average Joe’s on State Road in Dartmouth in 1994. The name Not Your Average Joe’s was chosen to distinguish the restaurant from other national casual dining chains and included a menu consisting of standard American cuisine with slight variations. The first initial restaurants had a global village coffeehouse aesthetic that would later change to industrial chic by the early 2010s.

By 2000, Not Your Average Joe’s had grown into a small regional chain with five locations, all within Massachusetts. Over the next decade, the company continued its expansion; by 2011, the chain had grown to 17 locations, extending its footprint beyond Massachusetts to include Maryland and Virginia. In November 2012, the company secured a growth investment from private equity firm Bruckmann, Rosser, Sherrill & Co. (BRS) through the issuance of convertible preferred stock. This capital infusion was intended to support the company's expansion in the Northeast. In 2016, Aaron Chambers, formerly of Daniel Boulud’s Dinex Group, was appointed as vice president of culinary and executive chef, succeeding Jeff Tenner. In September 2017, Peter D’Amelio, who was formerly associated with The Cheesecake Factory and Cooper’s Hawk Winery & Restaurants, was appointed as president and chief operating officer. Founder Steve Silverstein remained as CEO, focusing on strategy and design. Not Your Average Joe’s expanded to a peak of 27 locations by 2018, adding 10 new restaurants over approximately six years. This growth extended the company's presence into additional states, including Rhode Island, New Hampshire, and Pennsylvania.

In March 2018, Steve Silverstein retired as CEO of Not Your Average Joe’s to pursue new business ventures in the South Coast region of Massachusetts. In April, D’Amelio was promoted to chairman and CEO. Later that year, Silverstein reacquired the original Dartmouth location and rebranded it as 'Joe’s Original', which operates independently from Not Your Average Joe’s despite featuring a near identical menu. During this period, the chain faced increasing challenges, including heightened market competition and oversaturation in the casual dining sector. Additionally, the financial pressures tied to its private equity investment placed strain on operations, particularly in newer markets. By 2019, these difficulties contributed to the closure of at least one location, with the Gaithersburg, Maryland, restaurant shutting down on July 27, 2019.

The onset of the COVID-19 pandemic had a significant impact on the chain. In early 2021, Not Your Average Joe’s began closing locations, including those in Arlington, Burlington, Methuen, Randolph, and Seekonk Massachusetts. These closures were cited as part of a strategic effort to maintain the restaurant chain’s viability during the winter months. Between 2019 and 2024, Not Your Average Joe’s closed a total of 13 locations, reducing its footprint from 26 locations (excluding Joe’s Original) to 14.

Following Steve Silverstein’s departure from the brand in 2018, he expanded his restaurant portfolio beyond Joe’s Original. In 2019, he acquired The Black Whale in New Bedford, and in 2022, he took ownership of The Sail Loft in Padanaram. In 2021, Silverstein partnered with Cisco Brewers of Nantucket to launch Cisco Brewers Kitchen & Bar in New Bedford. Silverstein’s current restaurant ventures operate independently and have no affiliation with Not Your Average Joe’s.

== Locations ==
As of 2026, Not Your Average Joe's operates 13 locations in Maryland, Massachusetts, New Hampshire, Pennsylvania, Rhode Island, and Virginia. A majority of the current locations are situated within the Greater Boston area. The chain has experienced fluctuations in the number of locations over the years, with closures and openings reflecting market dynamics.

Location	Town Name	State
Old Georgetown Rd	Bethesda	MD
Main St	Acton	MA
Iyannough Rd	Hyannis	MA
Market Pl Dr	Waltham	MA
Main St	Watertown	MA
University Ave	Westwood	MA
Daniel Webster Hwy	Nashua	NH
St James Pl	Ardmore	PA
Glen Eagle Square	Glen Mills	PA
Bald Hill Rd	Warwick	RI
Fountain Dr	Reston	VA
Great Road	Bedford	MA
Potomac Town Pl	Woodbridge	VA

== Operations ==
Not Your Average Joe's offers dine-in, takeout, delivery services, and catering. In recent years, the chain has expanded its digital ordering platforms and loyalty programs. Every location features a bar, an open kitchen, outdoor seating, and a gas-powered brick pizza oven. Locations have a standardized menu that focuses on American-style fare and industrial chic decor; locations average around 7,000 square feet (650 m^{2}), with an approximate 200 seat capacity. Marketing for the chain is limited to social media engagement. The chain offers complimentary bread service which includes caramelized onion focaccia and seasoned olive oil.

== See also ==
- Ninety Nine: casual restaurant chain also founded in Massachusetts
