= Newington Plantation =

Archaeological site in South Carolina, United States

- U.S. National Register of Historic Places
- Nearest city: Stallsville, South Carolina
- Area: 2.9 acres (1.2 ha)
- NRHP reference No.: 74001850
- Added to NRHP: September 17, 1974

Newington Plantation is a historic archaeological site located near Stallsville, Dorchester County, South Carolina. The plantation was originally settled in the early or middle 1680s. Newington includes the remains of a series of house forms as they developed from an early single timber and clay structure destroyed sometime around the Yamasee War in 1715 to the fine, large brick structure built by Joseph Blake. The plantation included terraced gardens, a reflecting pool, brick outbuildings, and the main house. The house burned in 1845, and the ruins stood until 1876, when an attempt made to salvage the bricks failed. After years under the plow, many of the ruins on the surface have disappeared and the ornamental lake has silted and gone to ruin.

It was added to the National Register of Historic Places in 1974.
