= Newington, New Hampshire =

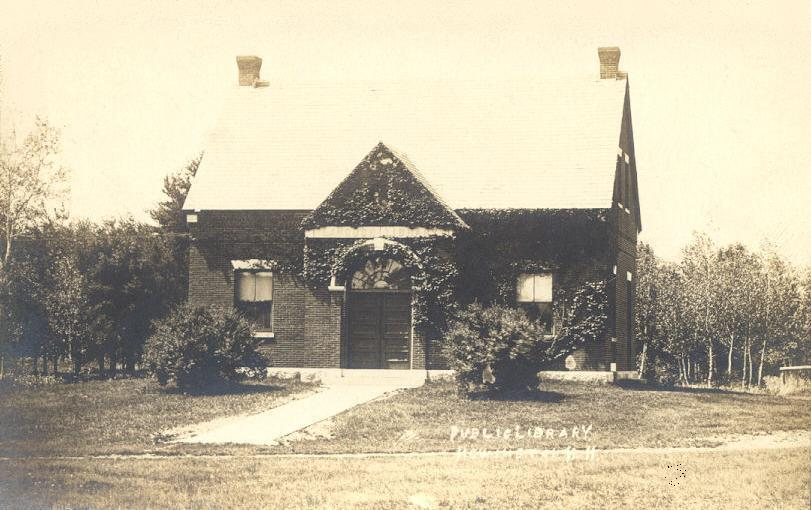
- Langdon Library c. 1910

- Seal

- Location in Rockingham County and the state of New Hampshire.
- Coordinates: 43°05′36″N 70°50′09″W
- Country: United States
- State: New Hampshire
- County: Rockingham
- Incorporated: 1764
- Villages: Newington; Newington Station; Piscataqua

Area
  - Total: 12.4 sq mi (32.0 km^{2})
  - Land: 8.1 sq mi (21.0 km^{2})
  - Water: 4.2 sq mi (11.0 km^{2}) 34.5%
- Elevation: 92 ft (28 m)

Population (2020)
  - Total: 811
  - Density: 100/sq mi (38.6/km^{2})
- Time zone: UTC-5 (Eastern)
  - Summer (DST): UTC-4 (Eastern)
- ZIP code: 03801
- Area code: 603
- FIPS code: 33-51620
- GNIS feature ID: 873680
- Website: www.newingtonnh.gov

Newington is a town in Rockingham County, New Hampshire, United States. The population was 811 at the 2020 census. It is bounded to the west by Great Bay, to the northwest by Little Bay and to the northeast by the Piscataqua River. The town serves as the American headquarters of the firearms manufacturing company SIG Sauer.

Newington is home to Portsmouth International Airport at Pease (formerly Pease Air Force Base) and to the New Hampshire Air National Guard. The 110-acre (45 ha) Old Town Center Historic District is listed on the National Register of Historic Places.

== History ==
=== Early years ===
Originally a part of Dover, boundary disputes among early river settlers caused this area to be called "Bloody Point". By 1640, Trickey's Ferry operated between Bloody Point and Hilton's Point in Dover. On August 22, 1690, Fox Point suffered an Indian raid during King William's War, in which 14 people were killed and six were captured.

In 1712, the meetinghouse was erected and the parish set off, named "Newington" for an English village, whose residents sent the bell for the meetinghouse. (Note: There are several places known as Newington in England—see Newington (disambiguation)—detail of which one sent the bell is lacking.) Behind the meetinghouse is a row of horse sheds, once commonplace. About 1725, the parsonage was built near the Town Forest, considered one of the oldest in the United States.

The town was incorporated in 1764 by colonial governor Benning Wentworth. In 1794, a bridge was completed across Little Bay from Fox Point in Newington to the south bank of the Bellamy River in Dover, by way of Goat Island—a major engineering feat in its day.

=== 20th century ===
In 1952, the House Armed Services Committee authorized acquiring by eminent domain large tracts to create Pease Air Force Base, which opened on June 30, 1956. Approximately 60% of the installation lay in Newington, including land in the town's center, and 40% was in neighboring Portsmouth. It would be, however, the first base recommended to be closed by the 1988 Commission on Base Realignment and Closure. Military personnel in 1990 began leaving the base, which officially closed on March 31, 1991. Although the Air National Guard retained some property, the old base has been intensely redeveloped, primarily in the Portsmouth section, as the Pease International Tradeport, a business park.

In the 1970s and 1980s, commercial development from Portsmouth spread into Newington. The Newington Mall opened in the 1970s, followed by the Fox Run Mall in 1983. The former was replaced by a big-box shopping center, The Crossings, in the 2000s, while the latter, renamed as the Mall at Fox Run in 2011, closed permanently in early 2026.

== Geography ==
According to the United States Census Bureau, the town has a total area of 12.4 square miles (32.0 km^{2}), of which 8.1 square miles (21.0 km^{2}) are land and 4.2 square miles (11.0 km^{2}) are water, comprising 34.5% of the town. The highest elevation in Newington is 130 feet (40 m) above sea level, near Newington Cemetery in the center of town.

The town is crossed by U.S. Route 4 and New Hampshire Route 16.

=== Adjacent municipalities ===
- Dover (north)
- Eliot, Maine (northeast)
- Portsmouth (southeast)
- Greenland (south)
- Newmarket (southwest)
- Durham (west)

== Demographics ==
Historical population
Census	Pop.	Note	%±
1790	542		—
1800	481		−11.3%
1810	508		5.6%
1820	541		6.5%
1830	549		1.5%
1840	543		−1.1%
1850	472		−13.1%
1860	475		0.6%
1870	414		−12.8%
1880	433		4.6%
1890	401		−7.4%
1900	390		−2.7%
1910	296		−24.1%
1920	398		34.5%
1930	381		−4.3%
1940	418		9.7%
1950	494		18.2%
1960	2,499		405.9%
1970	798		−68.1%
1980	716		−10.3%
1990	990		38.3%
2000	775		−21.7%
2010	753		−2.8%
2020	811		7.7%
U.S. Decennial Census

As of the census of 2000, there were 775 people, 294 households, and 209 families residing in the town. The population density was 92.7 inhabitants per square mile (35.8/km^{2}). There were 305 housing units at an average density of 36.5 per square mile (14.1/km^{2}). The racial makeup of the town was 96.00% White, 1.81% African American, 0.26% Native American, 1.03% Asian, and 0.90% from two or more races. Hispanic or Latino of any race were 1.81% of the population.

There were 294 households, out of which 28.2% had children under the age of 18 living with them, 59.5% were married couples living together, 6.8% had a female householder with no husband present, and 28.9% were non-families. 21.8% of all households were made up of individuals, and 8.2% had someone living alone who was 65 years of age or older. The average household size was 2.55 and the average family size was 3.01.

In the town, the population was spread out, with 21.9% under the age of 18, 4.6% from 18 to 24, 28.4% from 25 to 44, 32.1% from 45 to 64, and 12.9% who were 65 years of age or older. The median age was 43 years. For every 100 females, there were 98.7 males. For every 100 females age 18 and over, there were 93.9 males.

The median income for a household in the town was $59,464, and the median income for a family was $76,202. Males had a median income of $48,750 versus $30,250 for females. The per capita income for the town was $30,172. About 5.0% of families and 4.6% of the population were below the poverty line, including 4.8% of those under age 18 and 5.3% of those age 65 or over.

== Economy ==
According to the 2016 Auditor's Report, the top businesses in Newington, ranked by assessed value, were:

- EP Newington Energy (a 575 megawatt electric power plant) now owned by Carlyle Power Partners
- Eversource Energy (power plant)
- Fox Run Joint Venture (mall)
- SIG Sauer (arms company)
- SBAF Running Fox (mall)
- Sprague & Sons (materials handling services)

Another local firm, Little Bay Lobster Co., exported about 50,000 pounds of lobster a week to China in early 2018. SubCom produces transoceanic fiber-optic cable, which, as it is being produced, is loaded directly onto a cable laying ship docked nearby on the Piscataqua River.

== Site of interest ==
- Great Bay National Wildlife Refuge

== Notable people ==
- Charles Coffin Harris (1822–1881), born in Newington; lawyer and Chief Justice of the Supreme Court of The Kingdom of Hawaiʻi
- John Pickering (1737–1805), born in Newington; federal judge and Chief Justice of the New Hampshire Superior Court
- Louis de Rochemont (1899–1978), resided in Newington; filmmaker (The March of Time)
