= South Carolina Highway 280 =

Former state highway in South Carolina, United States

South Carolina Highway 280
- Parris Island Gateway

Route information
- Maintained by SCDOT
- Length: 4.4 mi (7.1 km)

Major junctions
- South end: SC 802 in Shell Point
- North end: US 21 in Burton

Location
- Country: United States
- State: South Carolina
- Counties: Beaufort

Highway system
- South Carolina State Highway System; Interstate; US; State; Scenic
← US 278	→ SC 281

South Carolina Highway 280 (SC 280) was a state highway located entirely within Beaufort County. The entirety of the route was along Parris Island Gateway, which remains the name of the road despite the decommissioning of the route number. The entirety of SC 280 is now U.S. Highway 21 (US 21).

== Route description ==
SC 280 began at an intersection with SC 802 (now SC 128) in Shell Point and ran northward through western portions of Port Royal and Beaufort before reaching its terminus at US 21 in Burton.

== History ==
In 2012, US 21 was re-routed around Beaufort in order to direct traffic headed towards the Sea Islands away from downtown. US 21 was routed along the entire stretch of Parris Island Gateway en route towards Ribaut Road and Lady's Island Drive, thus eliminating the need to have an individual state highway number. SCDOT decommissioned the route number but retains maintenance responsibility.

== Major intersections ==
The entire route was in Beaufort County.

Location	mi	km	Destinations	Notes
Shell Point	0.0	0.0	SC 802	Southern terminus
Burton			SC 170	
Burton	4.4	7.1	US 21	Northern terminus
1.000 mi = 1.609 km; 1.000 km = 0.621 mi
