= Port Royal Island =

Island in South Carolina, U.S.

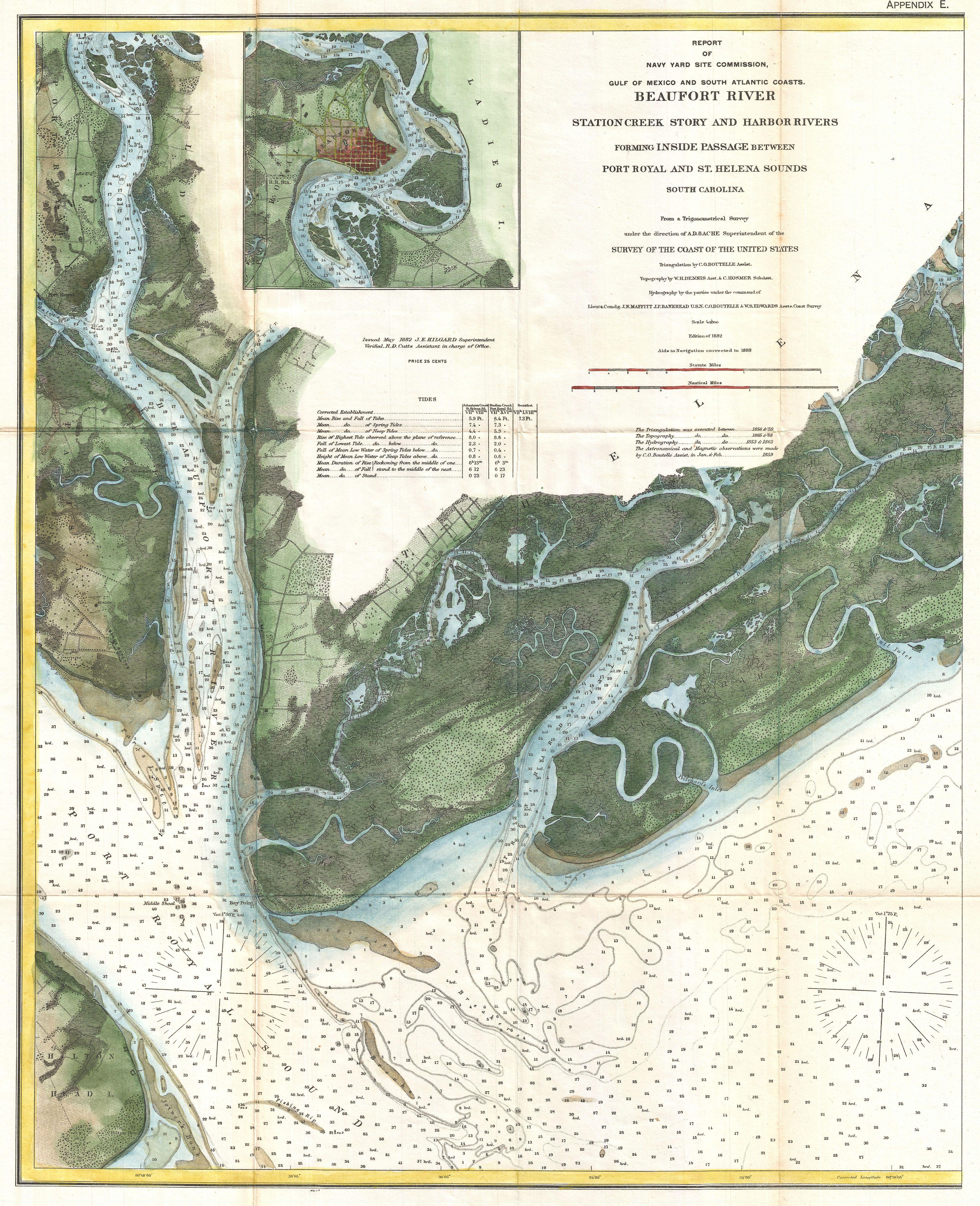
- Beaufort River, Station Creek Story, and Harbor Rivers Forming Inside Passage Between Port Royal and St. Helena Sounds South Carolina

- Port Royal Island Port Royal Island (North Atlantic)

Geography
- Location: North Atlantic
- Coordinates: 32°26′08″N 80°44′19″W

Administration
- United States
- County: Beaufort County

Port Royal Island (historically Port Royal) is an island located in Beaufort County, South Carolina. It is considered one of the Sea Islands in the Lowcountry region and is the most populous island in northern Beaufort County, containing most of the incorporated areas of Beaufort, Port Royal, and other unincorporated communities. The island also contains the Marine Corps Air Station Beaufort and Naval Hospital Beaufort military installations. The island takes its name from the Port Royal Sound, a historically significant harbor during colonial settlement in the 16th, 17th, and 18th centuries. From the time of its European discovery to the late 19th century, the name "Port Royal" typically applied to Port Royal Island as a whole and the surrounding waterways. In the early 21st century, the term Port Royal is understood to apply to the incorporated town of Port Royal.

== History ==
In 1562, the French settlement of Charlesfort was established on Parris Island. The leader of the settlement was Jean Ribault, who referred to the name of the sound and the island as Port Royal, or royal port in French. After the Charlesfort settlement failed, the Spanish attempted to establish their own Santa Elena settlement in 1566, a name that is used to this day for nearby St. Helena Island. During the English colonization of Carolina, the English adopted the name Port Royal for the sound and for the present-day Parris Island once their colonization efforts began, with the establishment of Charles Town in 1670. Later, after the death in 1736 of Colonel Alexander Parris, who owned that island, it came to be known as Parris Island, and the name Port Royal Island was transferred to the island to the north.

In 1779 the Battle of Beaufort was fought on the island between American and British forces, resulting in an American victory. In 1861, the Battle of Port Royal was fought between Union and Confederate forces, resulting in a Union victory and the occupation of Beaufort for the remainder of the Civil War.

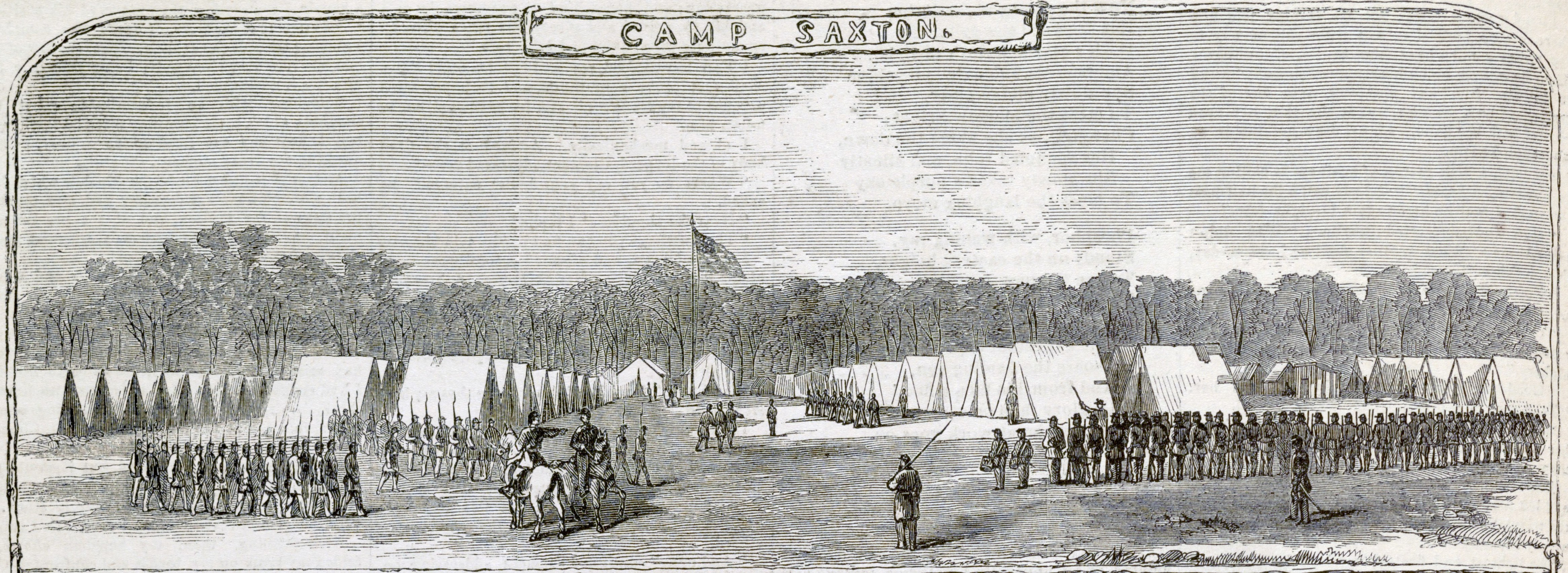
Port Royal Island, Camp Saxton (Smith's plantation) the new headquarters of the 1st S.C. Vol. (Colored), Col. Higginson in 1863

Historically, the island has been predominantly agricultural and had been developed as plantations in the antebellum years. Since the 1960s, the island has become mostly residential and commercial in character, though rural areas continue to exist in the extreme northern and western portions of the island along the Whale Branch River.

== Communities ==
- Beaufort
- Burton
- Laurel Bay
- Port Royal
- Shell Point
