= South Carolina Highway 116 =

State highway in South Carolina, United States

South Carolina Highway 116
- Laurel Bay Road

Route information
- Maintained by SCDOT
- Length: 3.400 mi (5.472 km)
- Existed: 1960s–present

Major junctions
- West end: Laurel Bay
- East end: US 21 at MCAS Beaufort

Location
- Country: United States
- State: South Carolina
- Counties: Beaufort

Highway system
- South Carolina State Highway System; Interstate; US; State; Scenic
← SC 114	→ SC 118

South Carolina Highway 116 (SC 116) is a 3.400-mile-long (5.472 km) state highway located entirely within Beaufort County, South Carolina, in the southern part of the U.S. state of South Carolina. Also known locally as Laurel Bay Road, SC 116 connects the Laurel Bay military housing development with the Marine Corps Air Station Beaufort (MCAS Beaufort) facility.

== Route description ==
SC 116 runs in a west-to-east direction and is primarily a two-lane road. Beginning from the guardhouse of the Laurel Bay military housing complex, the road is a four-lane divided highway. After it intersects Joe Frazier Road it narrows to a two-lane undivided road. SC 116 passes a couple of businesses whilst the rest of the surroundings is mostly woods. The west half of the highway is in the census designated place (CDP) of Laurel Bay, much of the east half's eastbound lane is in the CDP of Burton, and a small portion of the road briefly passes within the city limits of Beaufort. Just before reaching MCAS Beaufort, SC 116 widens to a four-lane divided highway again and ends at an intersection with U.S. Route 21 (US 21) on the border of the Beaufort.

== Major Intersections ==
The entire route is in Beaufort County.

Location	mi	km	Destinations	Notes
Laurel Bay	0.000	0.000	Military housing complex guardhouse	Western terminus; Laurel Bay Road continues past terminus.
Burton–Beaufort line	3.400	5.472	US 21 (Trask Parkway) / Geiger Boulevard east – Charleston, Columbia, Beaufort, MCAS Beaufort	Eastern terminus; roadway continues as Geiger Boulevard.
1.000 mi = 1.609 km; 1.000 km = 0.621 mi
