= Battle of Beaufort =

1779 battle of the American Revolutionary War

- Part of the American Revolutionary War
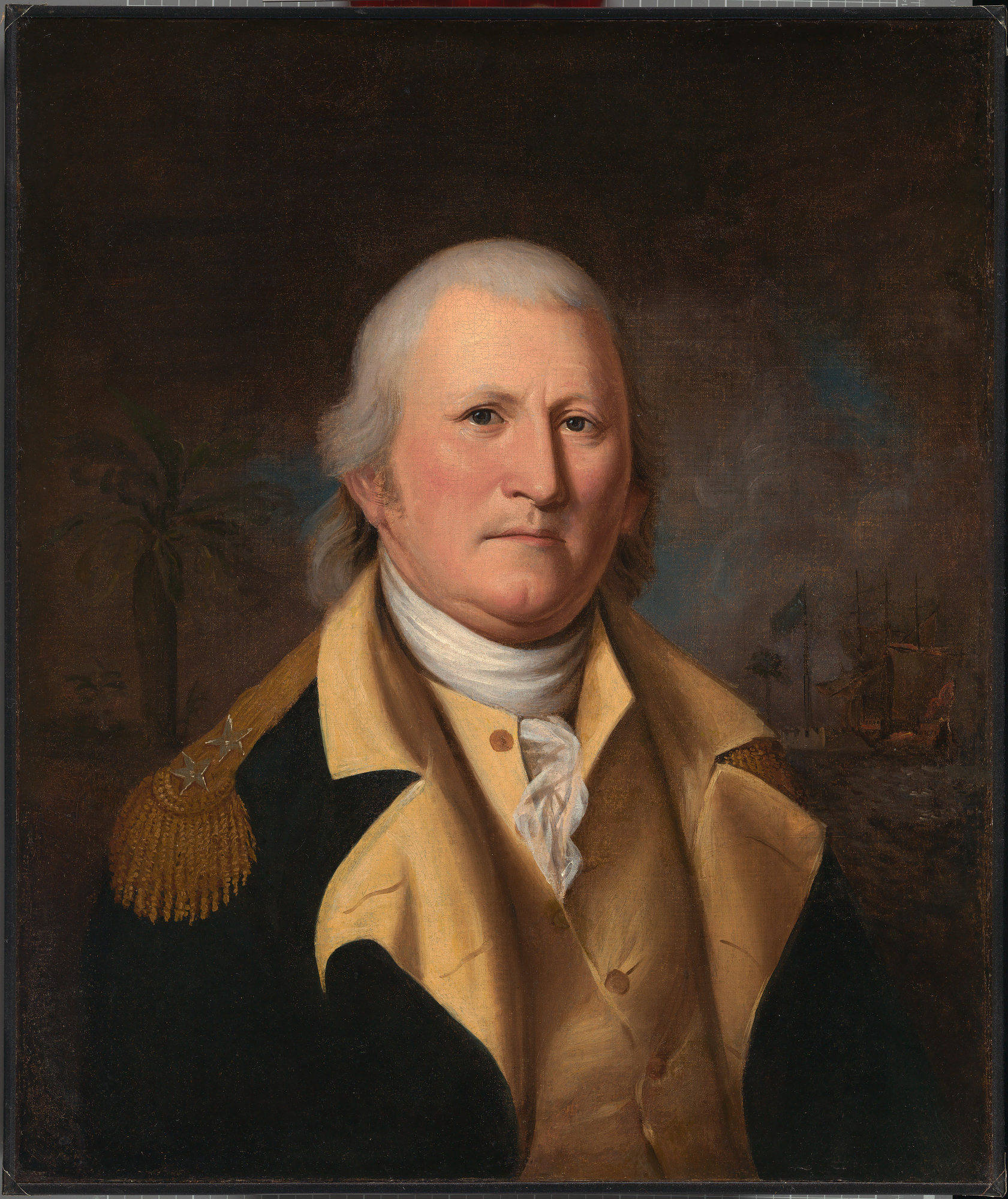
- General William Moultrie, portrait by Charles Willson Peale
Date	February 3, 1779
Location	Port Royal Island, South Carolina 32°30′1″N 80°44′37″W
Result	American victory

Belligerents
Great Britain	United States

Commanders and leaders
William Gardner	William Moultrie

Strength
200 infantry 1 artillery piece	300 militia 20 infantry 3 artillery pieces

Casualties and losses
40 killed or wounded 7–12 captured	8 killed 22 wounded

The Battle of Beaufort, also known as the Battle of Port Royal Island, was fought on February 3, 1779, near Beaufort, South Carolina, during the American Revolutionary War. The battle took place not long after British forces consolidated control around Savannah, Georgia, which they had captured in December 1778.

Brigadier General Augustine Prevost sent 200 British regulars to seize Port Royal Island at the mouth of the Broad River in South Carolina in late January 1779. Major General Benjamin Lincoln, the American commander in the south, sent South Carolina Brigadier General William Moultrie from Purrysburg, South Carolina with a mixed force composed mainly of militia, but with a few Continental Army men, to meet the British advance. The battle was inconclusive, but the British withdrew first and suffered heavier casualties than the Americans.

== Background ==
The British began their "southern strategy" by sending expeditions from New York City and Saint Augustine, East Florida to capture Savannah, Georgia late in 1778. The New York expedition, under the command of Lieutenant Colonel Archibald Campbell, arrived first, and successfully captured the town on December 29, 1778. Remnants of Savannah's defenders combined with South Carolina militia under Major General Benjamin Lincoln at an encampment at Purrysburg, South Carolina to oppose the British.

When Brigadier General Augustine Prevost arrived from Saint Augustine in mid-January 1779, he assumed command of the garrison there, and on the 22nd sent a force under Campbell to take control of Augusta and raise Loyalist militia companies. Prevost decided thereafter to send a force to occupy Port Royal Island just up the coast in South Carolina, where he had been led to believe that Loyalist sentiment was strong. On January 29 HMS Vigilant, an unseaworthy ship of the line that had been converted to a floating battery, was towed by Royal Navy crews in longboats through the channel separating Hilton Head Island from the mainland. She was accompanied by a flotilla of smaller ships that carried 200 infantry from the 16th and 60th Regiments under Major William Gardner, who had orders to take control of Beaufort, the island's main settlement.

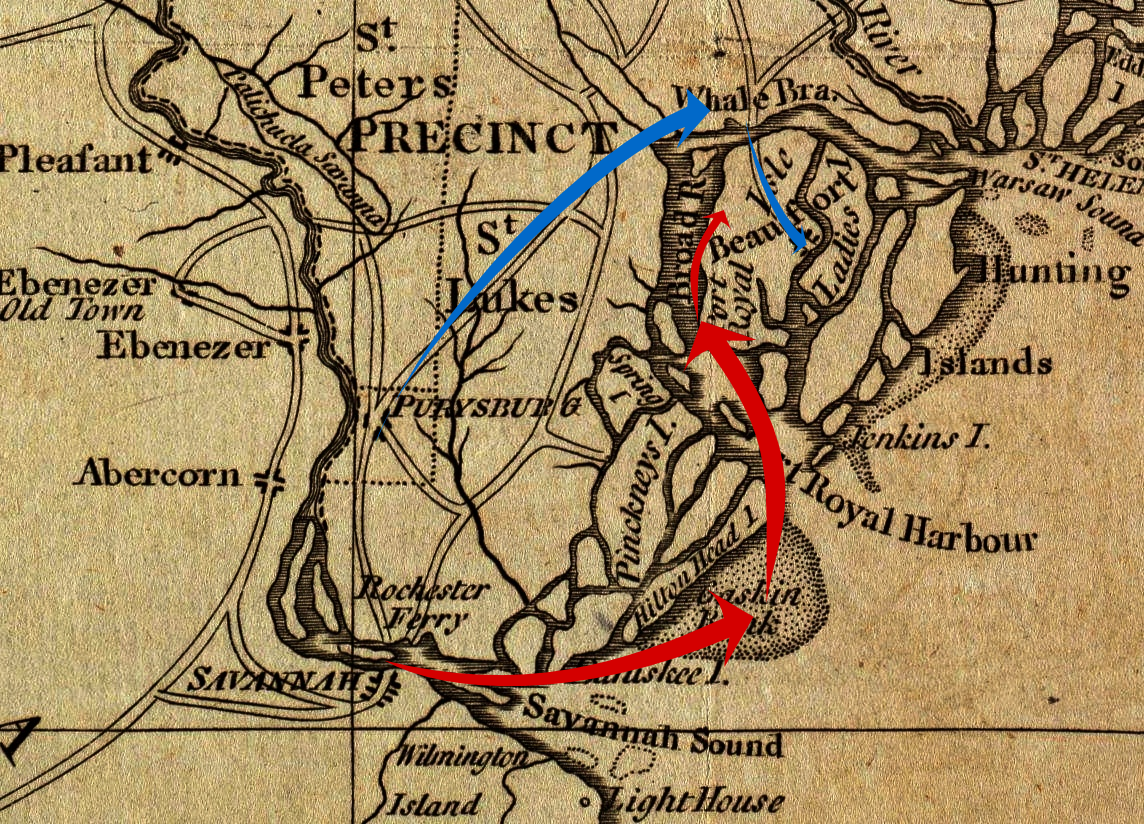
A 1779 map of the area, annotated to show how forces reached Port Royal Island. British movements are shown in red, American movements in blue.

The only major defense establishment on Port Royal Island was Fort Lyttelton, which was garrisoned by a company of Continental Army troops under Captain John DeTreville. When he learned that a comparatively large British force was moving in his direction, he spiked the fort's cannons and blew up its main bastion in order to deny their use to the superior force. When General Lincoln learned that communications with Port Royal Island had been cut off by the British advance, he sent South Carolina Brigadier General William Moultrie, who had distinguished himself in the 1776 Battle of Sullivan's Island, and 300 men to counter the move. Moultrie's force was composed mostly of South Carolina militia from the Beaufort area, but it was accompanied by a few Continental Army regulars, and two companies of artillery from Charleston, which were headed by former Congressmen Edward Rutledge and Thomas Heyward, Jr. This force arrived at the main Port Royal ferry on the 31st, not long after DeTreville had finished destroying the fort. They crossed over to the island on February 1 and occupied Beaufort.

== Battle ==
Gardner's men landed on Port Royal Island at the plantation of Andrew Deveaux (present-day Laurel Bay), a Loyalist who may have guided them, on February 2. Gardner sent a detachment to secure the island side of the ferry. These men retreated when they encountered Patriot troops, and Gardner began to move his main force toward Beaufort to face the Americans. Early on February 3 General Moultrie was alerted to the British presence, and moved his forces out of town. The two forces met near the highest ground on Port Royal Island, a rise called Gray's Hill that was about 3 miles (4.8 km) south of the ferry and in the middle of the island.

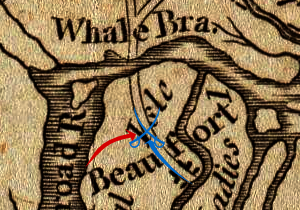
Movements after the British landing leading up to the battle

Gardner lined his men up at the edge of some woods near the top of the hill and advanced with bayonets fixed. The Americans approached and lined up in an open field outside musket range. General Moultrie positioned two six-pound field cannons in the center of his line, with a smaller two-pounder on the right. The Americans then advanced on the British, Moultrie observing that the action was "reversed from the usual way of fighting between British and Americans; they taking the bushes and we taking the open ground." The Americans opened fire first with the artillery, and then with musket volleys. The battle continued for about 45 minutes, at which point the Americans were running low on ammunition. Moultrie had begun a withdrawal when the British were also observed to retreat, leaving the field to the Americans. A company of light horse militia chased after the British, very nearly cutting them off from their boats. They captured 26 men, but were unable to hold all of them due to their small numbers.

== Aftermath ==
In addition to the prisoners taken (sources cite either seven or twelve were retained), the British reportedly suffered 40 killed or wounded, although deserters reported that nearly half of Gardner's men had been hit by American fire. The Americans, in contrast, suffered only 8 killed and 22 wounded.

Gardner was criticized by Prevost for the mauling his detachment received because he strayed too far from his boats. It was not Gardner's fault, however, that he had no Loyalist support. The victory of a largely militia force over British regulars was a boost to the Americans' morale. However, severe losses incurred in early March at Brier Creek delayed American plans to move against Prevost's forces in Georgia. When Lincoln began moving troops toward Augusta in April, Prevost moved in force toward Charleston, but was able to do little more than briefly blockade the city before retreating back to Savannah. Port Royal Island was again occupied by the British during this campaign.

The battle is commemorated by a highway marker on U. S. Route 21 near the battle site. Fort Lyttelton's remains are listed on the National Register of Historic Places. As of mid-2023, the American Battlefield Trust and its partners have preserved more than 12 acres of the battlefield.
