= South Carolina Highway 281 =

State highway in South Carolina, United States

South Carolina Highway 281
- Ribaut Road

Route information
- Maintained by SCDOT
- Length: 3.190 mi (5.134 km)
- Existed: 2012–present

Major junctions
- South end: US 21 in Port Royal
- North end: US 21 Bus. in Beaufort

Location
- Country: United States
- State: South Carolina
- Counties: Beaufort

Highway system
- South Carolina State Highway System; Interstate; US; State; Scenic
| ← US 278 | → SC 283 |

South Carolina Highway 281 (SC 281) is a 3.190-mile (5.134 km) state highway located entirely within Beaufort County, in the southern part of the U.S. state of South Carolina. Known locally as Ribaut Road (pronounced REE-bo), SC 281 serves as an arterial connecting Beaufort and Port Royal.

== Route description ==
SC 281 runs in a south-north direction and is a four-lane road for the entirety of the route. SC 281 travels along a portion of Ribaut Road. South of its southern terminus, Ribaut Road continues as U.S. Highway 21 (US 21) towards Parris Island. Beginning at an intersection with US 21 just west of the McTeer Bridge, SC 281 travels north towards its northern terminus at US 21 Business in front of Beaufort's city hall and near Beaufort County's government complex. The route passes by the Technical College of the Lowcountry and Beaufort Memorial Hospital.

== History ==
Prior to the completion of the McTeer Bridge in the early 1980s, SC 281 was signed for Ribaut Road. When US 21 Business was created and US 21 was re-routed (away from downtown Beaufort and along Ribaut Road and over the McTeer Bridge), SC 281 was decommissioned for a 30-year period. In 2012, US 21 was re-routed again, this time further to the west and south in order to help direct traffic towards the Sea Islands away from Ribaut Road. This eliminated the US 21 designation for Ribaut Road and allowed for a re-designation of SC 281 along Ribaut Road.

== Major intersections ==
The entire route is in Beaufort County.

| Location | mi | km | Destinations | Notes |
|---|---|---|---|---|
| Port Royal | 0.000 | 0.000 | US 21 (Ribaut Road / Ladys Island Drive) – Beaufort, Gardens Corner | Southern terminus |
| Beaufort | 3.190 | 5.134 | US 21 Bus. (Boundary Street) – Pocotaligo, Beaufort | Northern terminus |
1.000 mi = 1.609 km; 1.000 km = 0.621 mi
