= South Carolina Highway 35 =

Highway in Cayce, South Carolina

South Carolina Highway 35

Route information
- Maintained by SCDOT
- Length: 5.630 mi (9.061 km)

Major junctions
- South end: I-77 in Cayce
- US 21 / US 176 / US 321 in Cayce; US 1 in West Columbia
- North end: US 378 in West Columbia

Location
- Country: United States
- State: South Carolina
- Counties: Lexington

Highway system
- South Carolina State Highway System; Interstate; US; State; Scenic
← SC 34	→ SC 37

South Carolina Highway 35 (SC 35) is a 5.630-mile-long (9.061 km) state highway in the U.S. state of South Carolina. The highway connects the southern part of Cayce and West Columbia.

== Route description ==
SC 35 begins at an interchange with Interstate 77 (I-77) in the southern part of Cayce. Here, the roadway continues as 12th Street Extension. It travels to the north and goes through the Saxe Gotha Industrial Park. It crosses over Congaree Creek on an unnamed bridge and passes the Cyril B. Busbee Middle School. It has an intersection with SC 2 (Frink Street) and transitions to 12th Street. A few blocks after an intersection with U.S. Route 21 (US 21)/US 176/US 321 (Knox Abbot Drive), the highway leaves Cayce and enters West Columbia. SC 35 then intersects US 1 (Augusta Road/Meeting Street). About two blocks later, the highway meets SC 12 (Jarvis Klapman Boulevard). Approximately 1,500 feet (460 m) later, it meets its northern terminus, an intersection with US 378 (Sunset Boulevard). Here, the roadway continues as Seminole Drive.

== Major intersections ==
The entire route is in Lexington County.

Location	mi	km	Destinations	Notes
Cayce	0.000– 0.187	0.000– 0.301	I-77 – Charleston, Spartanburg, Charlotte	Southern terminus
Cayce	3.330	5.359	SC 2 (Frink Street)	
Cayce	4.250	6.840	US 21 / US 176 / US 321 (Knox Abbot Drive)	
West Columbia	4.780	7.693	Charleston Highway (US 21 Conn.)	
West Columbia	4.850	7.805	US 1 (Augusta Road / Meeting Street)	
West Columbia	5.110	8.224	SC 12 (Jarvis Klapman Boulevard) – Columbia	
West Columbia	5.630	9.061	US 378 (Sunset Boulevard)	Northern terminus
1.000 mi = 1.609 km; 1.000 km = 0.621 mi
