= South Carolina Highway 802 =

State highway in South Carolina, United States

South Carolina Highway 802
- Sams Point Road
- SC 802 highlighted in red

Route information
- Maintained by SCDOT
- Length: 6.690 mi (10.767 km)
- Existed: 1942–present

Major junctions
- West end: US 21 / US 21 Bus. in Beaufort
- East end: Coosaw River Drive on Coosaw Island

Location
- Country: United States
- State: South Carolina
- Counties: Beaufort

Highway system
- South Carolina State Highway System; Interstate; US; State; Scenic
← SC 781	→ SC 823

South Carolina Highway 802 (SC 802), is a 6.690-mile (10.767 km) state highway located entirely within Beaufort County, South Carolina. Also known locally as Sams Point Road, SC 802 serves as the principal arterial for Lady's Island and provides the only access to Coosaw Island.

== Route description ==
SC 802 runs in a generally southwest to northeast direction. SC 802 travels along the entirety of Sams Point Road, beginning at the intersection of U.S. Route 21 (US 21) and US 21 Business within the city limits of Beaufort on Lady's Island. The intersection is surrounded by numerous commercial businesses. Heading north along the four-lane Sams Point Road, SC 802 heads through a residential neighborhood with a high density of trees. The highway exits the city and travels through unincorporated areas for the remainder of its route. At Brickyard Point Road, the highway intersects the road at a roundabout and thereafter, SC 802 is only two lanes wide. Continuing north on the island, the highway begins to curve to the east and reaches the community of Wilkins. It crosses the Lucy Creek on the L.G. Barnwell Bridge in enter Coosaw Island. The highway officially ends at the eastern end of the bridge though an end SC 802 sign assembly is found further east along Coosaw River Drive.

== History ==
Until 2012, SC 802 was a 14.9-mile (24.0 km) route that traversed Lady's Island, Port Royal, and Shell Point along Lady's Island Drive, Ribaut Road, Parris Island Gateway, and Savannah Highway. With the re-routing of US 21 on February 26, 2012, the route for SC 802 was truncated to the current 6.69 miles (10.77 km). The Savannah Highway portion of SC 802 became SC 128, while other portions of the route were re-designated as US 21.

== Major intersections ==
The entire route is in Beaufort County.

Location	mi	km	Destinations	Notes
Beaufort	0.000	0.000	US 21 (Sea Island Drive / Lady Island Drive) / US 21 Bus. north	Western terminus of SC 802; southern terminus of US 21 Bus.
Wilkins	6.682	10.754	L.G. Barnwell Bridge	Crossing over Lucy Creek
Coosaw Island	6.690	10.767	Coosaw River Drive east	Official eastern terminus; roadway continues as Coosaw River Drive.
Coosaw Island			Coosaw River Drive east	Signed eastern terminus; roadway continues as Coosaw River Drive.
1.000 mi = 1.609 km; 1.000 km = 0.621 mi
