= Chester Field (Laurel Bay, South Carolina) =

Archaeological site in South Carolina, United States

- U.S. National Register of Historic Places
- Nearest city: Laurel Bay, South Carolina
- Area: 1.5 acres (0.61 ha)
- NRHP reference No.: 70000565
- Added to NRHP: October 15, 1970

Chester Field, located in Beaufort County, South Carolina, is one of the nearly two dozen prehistoric shell rings that run from the center coast of South Carolina to the northeast coast of Florida. Archaeologists date the pottery that has been found at these sites to be in the second millennium BC, this placing the artifacts among the earliest pottery of North America. The purpose or use of the ring shape is not known. This “address restricted” site was listed in the National Register of Historic Places on October 15, 1970.
