= Oehme, van Sweden & Associates =

American landscape architecture firm

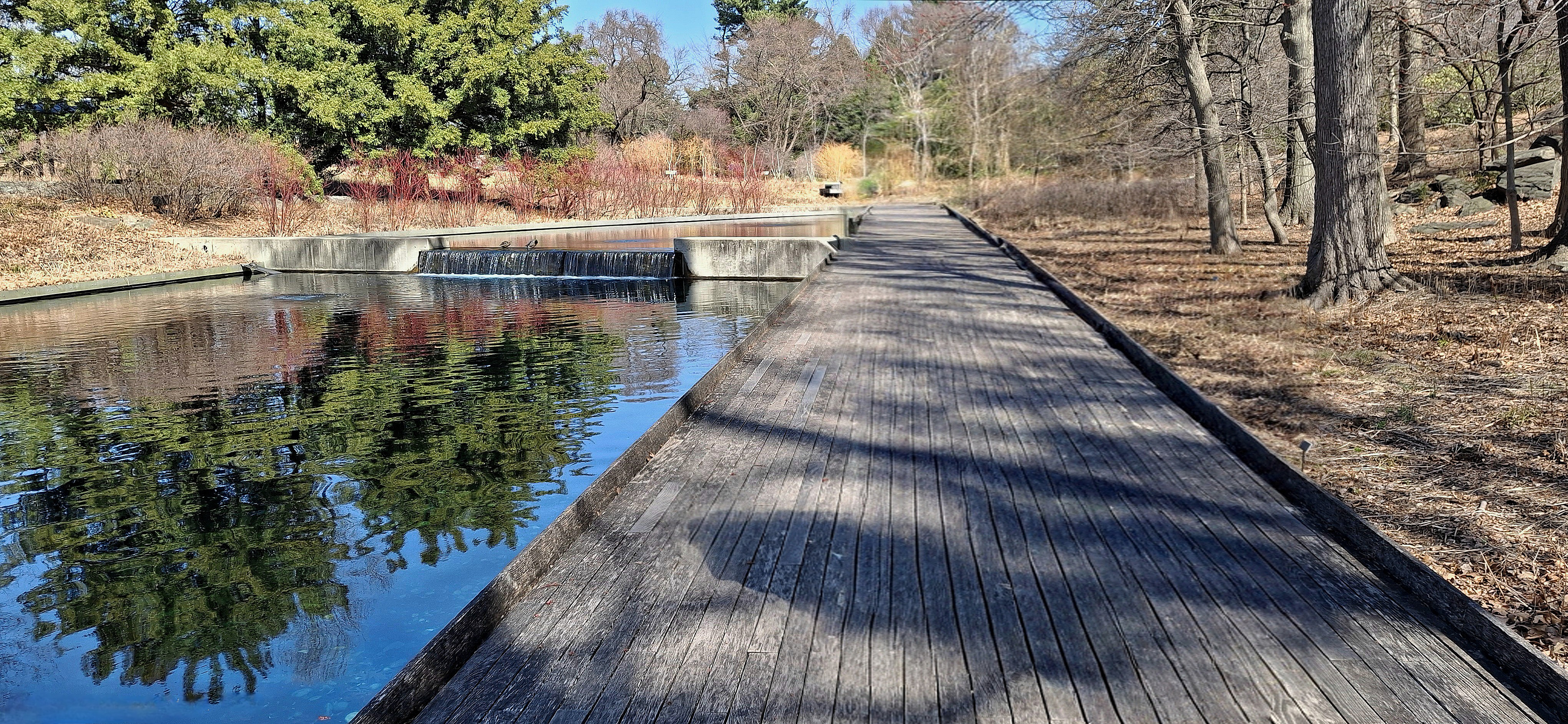
Native Plant Garden at the New York Botanical Garden

Oehme, van Sweden & Associates is a Washington, D.C.–based landscape architecture firm known for its focus on sustainability in landscape architecture. It was founded in 1975 by Wolfgang Oehme and James van Sweden. The firm is a proponent of the "New American Garden" style, which is characterized by large swaths of grasses and fields of perennials.

Notable works of OvS' include the landscape architectural design for the Federal Reserve Campus in Washington, DC; The National World War II Memorial, the Martin Luther King Jr. National Memorial, Tippet Rise Art Centre in Fishtail, Montana; and multiple commissions at both Chicago Botanic Garden and The New York Botanical Garden, including the Native Plant Garden.

== Design philosophy ==
OvS' designs embrace the ideals of low-input landscaping: plant diversity with limited inputs of pesticides, fertilizer, water, and maintenance. The firm aims to integrate new projects and plantings into natural landscapes and ecosystems, and in these, create landscaping and gardens which react to the changes in seasons and weather.

== Key persons ==
Wolfgang Oehme – Co-founded OvS with James van Sweden. Worked at OvS from its founding until retiring in 2008.

James van Sweden – Co-founded OvS with Wolfgang Oehme. Worked at OvS until retiring due to illness in 2011.

Lisa Delplace – Director and CEO Emeritus of OvS; has worked there since 1988.

Eric Groft – Owner and director of OvS; has worked there since 1986.

Sheila Brady – Principal partner of OvS; has worked there since 1987.

== Awards and honours ==
The firm was named recipient of the American Society of Landscape Architects' 2014 Landscape Architecture Firm Award. The award recognizes a “distinguished body of work that influences the professional practice of landscape architecture.”

The firm's project to improve the landscaping for a block of town homes in the Ellen Wilson neighbourhood of Capitol Hill in Washington, D.C., was recognized with an American Institute of Architects Honor Award in 1998. In the same year, the firm received a Residential Design Honor Award from the American Society of Landscape Architects for their work on a residential Coastal Island Retreat on Pine Island, South Carolina.

== Publications ==
- van Sweden, James and Christopher, Tom (2011). The Artful Garden: Creative Inspiration for Landscape Design. Random House. ISBN 978-1-4000-6389-5
- van Sweden, James and Christopher, Tom (2002). Architecture in the Garden. Random House. ISBN 978-0-375-50154-8.
- van Sweden, James (1997). Gardening With Nature. Random House. ISBN 978-0-8230-2078-2.
- van Sweden, James (1995). Gardening With Water. Random House. ISBN 978-0-679-42946-3.
