= Kathryn R. Wall =

American author of mystery novels

Kathryn R. Wall is an American author of mystery novels. She has lived in Hilton Head, South Carolina, since 1994 when she moved there with her husband Norman. She wrote her first novel, In For a Penny, after retiring from her 25-year career as an accountant. Bay Tanner, the title character in her series, is a young widow residing on Hilton Head Island and in Beaufort County, South Carolina.

== Books ==
- In For A Penny (2002)
- And Not A Penny More (2002)
- Perdition House (2003)
- Judas Island (2004)
- Resurrection Road (2005)
- Bishop's Reach (2006)
- Sanctuary Hill (2007)
- The Mercy Oak (2008)
- Covenant Hall (2009)
- Canaan's Gate (2010)
- Jericho Cay (2011)
- St. John's Folly (2013)
- Jordan Point (2015)
