= South Carolina Highway 2 =

State highway in Lexington County, South Carolina

South Carolina Highway 2

Route information
- Maintained by SCDOT
- Length: 3.940 mi (6.341 km)
- Existed: 1923–present

Major junctions
- South end: US 21 / US 176 / US 321 in Cayce
- US 21 / US 176 / US 321 in Cayce; US 1 in West Columbia
- North end: US 378 in West Columbia

Location
- Country: United States
- State: South Carolina
- Counties: Lexington

Highway system
- South Carolina State Highway System; Interstate; US; State; Scenic
| ← US 1 | → SC 3 |

South Carolina Highway 2 (SC 2) is a state highway in the U.S. state of South Carolina that travels 3.9 miles (6.3 km) between two portions of U.S. Route 21/U.S. Route 176/U.S. Route 321 (US 21/US 176/US 321) in Lexington County. The southern 2.4 miles (3.9 km) of the highway are known as Frink Street while the northern 1.5 miles (2.4 km) of the highway are known as State Street.

== Route description ==
SC 2 is a 3.9-mile (6.3 km), two-lane road just southwest of Columbia, serving as a business route for Cayce. It begins at the US 21/US 176/US 321 concurrency heading northeast. It then takes a turn to the north and runs parallel to the Congaree River to its west. Shortly after passing US 1, the highway ends at US 378 in West Columbia. The highway runs by an elementary school, Brookland-Cayce High School, two shopping centers, and a park.

== History ==
SC 2 is one of the original state highways. The original path went from the Georgia state line north of Mountain Rest heading east towards Greenville before turning southeast and ending in Charleston, spanning over 250 miles (400 km). It was considered the state's "Main Street" in the 1920s and 1930s. The road began construction in 1923 and ended 11 years later in 1932. The road was re-designated as US 76, US 176 and US 178 in the 1940s and has been reduced to just under four miles (6.4 km). Additionally, only the Frink Street portion of the route is signed, and minimally at that.

== Major intersections ==
The entire highway is in Lexington County.

| Location | mi | km | Destinations | Notes |
|---|---|---|---|---|
| Cayce | 0.000 | 0.000 | US 21 / US 176 / US 321 (Charleston Highway) | Southern terminus |
| Cayce | 1.610 | 2.591 | SC 35 (12th Street) | |
| Cayce | 3.230 | 5.198 | US 21 / US 176 / US 321 (Knox Abbott Drive) | |
| West Columbia | 3.890 | 6.260 | US 1 (Meeting Street) | |
| West Columbia | 3.940 | 6.341 | US 378 (Sunset Boulevard) | Northern terminus |
1.000 mi = 1.609 km; 1.000 km = 0.621 mi

== Little Mountain alternate route ==
South Carolina Highway 2 Alternate
- Location: Little Mountain, South Carolina
- Existed: c. 1940–1947

South Carolina Highway 2 Alternate (SC 2 Alt.) was a short alternate route that was a different path from Little Mountain to Slighs. Both of its termini were at U.S. Route 76 (US 76) and SC 2. It was established between 1939 and 1941 and was decommissioned in 1947. It was downgraded to a secondary road.
