= Wolfgang Oehme =

German-American landscape architect

Wolfgang Oehme (May 18, 1930 Chemnitz, Germany – December 15, 2011, Towson, Maryland) was a German-American landscape architect.

== Early life ==
Oehme grew up in Wissmannhof in Chemnitz. After leaving school in 1947, he began an apprenticeship at the Illge nursery. Upon completing his apprenticeship, he worked in an urban garden office, where he was a landscape architect with Hans-Joachim Bauer, and became familiar with the landscaping ideas of Karl Foerster. From 1952, he worked at the Spaeth nursery in Baumschulenweg in East Berlin.

Oehme studied from 1952 to 1954 in Dahlem with a scholarship in landscape architecture. In 1953, he helped on the site of the International Garden Festival in Old Elbpark in Hamburg to create trenches. He admired the designer of the Expo, Karl Plomin. Oehme moved in 1953 to West Berlin.

== Career ==
After graduation, Oehme worked in the nursery of Waterer Sons & Crisp in Bagshot and then got a job with the city parks department in Frankfurt am Main, Germany. From 1956 he was employed by the Delius company in Nuremberg. Oehme, a great admirer of the works of Karl May emigrated in 1957 on the recommendation of Hubert Owens from Nuremberg to the United States. Initially, he worked for landscape architect Bruce Baetjer before 1959 in the Baltimore County Office of Planning and was hired by the Baltimore County Recreation and Parks as a landscape architect. He designed, among other things, playgrounds and golf courses.

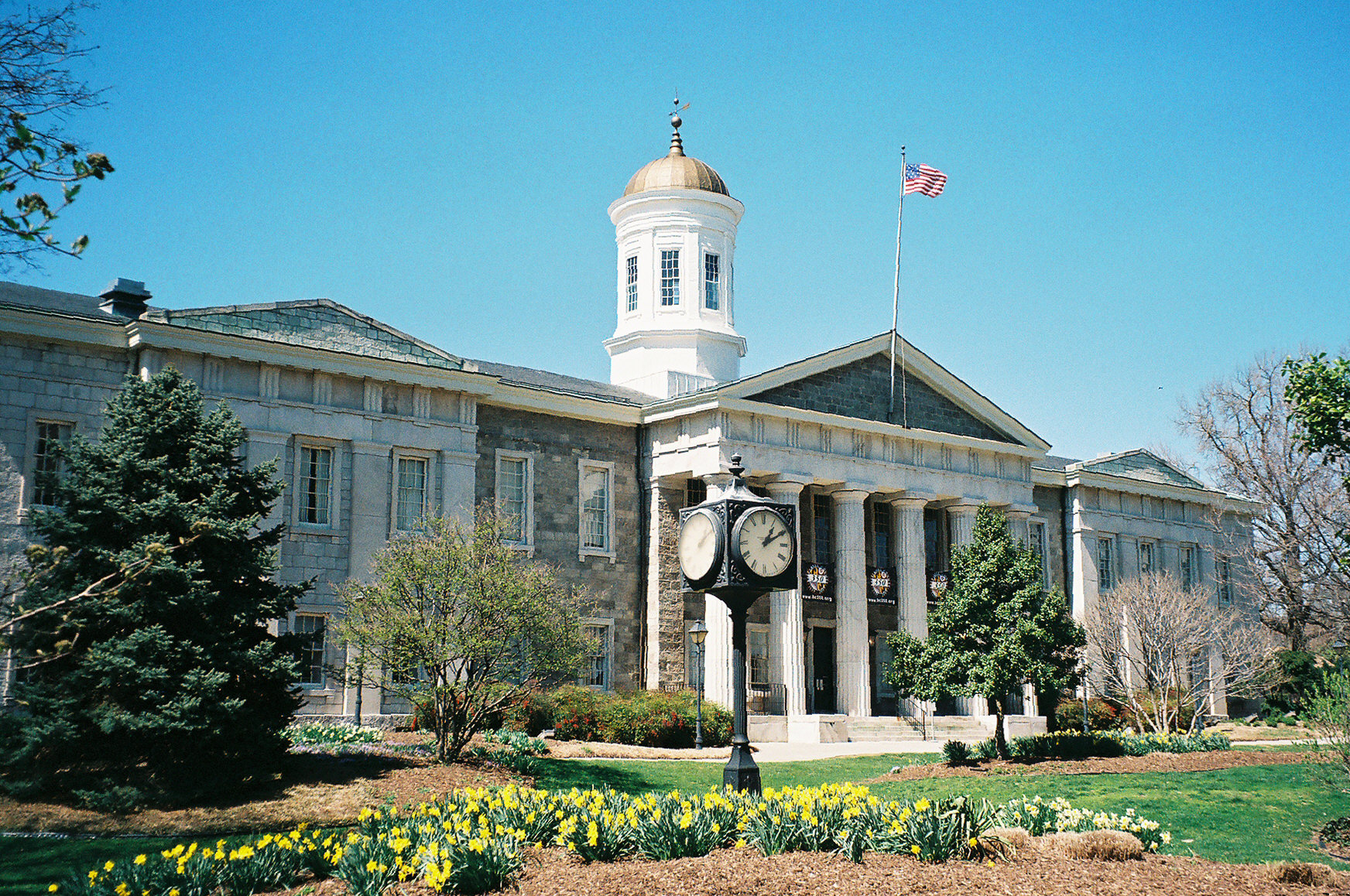
The Towson (Md.) Courthouse, with landscaping by Oehme

Later, in 1988, he designed the acclaimed landscaping at Baltimore County's Old Courthouse in Towson, Maryland.

In 1966, Oehme joined the Rouse Company in Maryland and designed gardens with ornamental grasses and perennials, but without lawns. His work was difficult because there were hardly any nurseries that sold suitable plants. With the help of Leo Vollmer, and partner Kurt Bluemel, he found a nursery that could provide appropriate plants. In 1975, Oehme and the American landscape architect James van Sweden created their own firm in Washington, D.C., Oehme, van Sweden & Associates (OvS). In 2008 he retired from the company and founded, with Carol Oppenheimer, the WOCO Organic Gardens LLC.

He often went to Germany to buy plants and botanical gardens, and visited the national garden shows. He also smuggled, hidden in a hollowed-out book, seeds in the United States, since the selection of ornamental plants there was initially very limited. Even relatives in Germany sent him seeds. In his later years he became increasingly eccentric, his lack of feeling for finances leading to conflicts within the company.

== Personal life and death ==
Oehme was married to Shirley Zinkhan; their marriage ended in divorce in 2004. From the marriage was a son, Roland Oehme. Oehme died at the age of 81 from stomach cancer.

The English garden author Noel Kingsbury describes Oehme as a loner, for whom only his gardens were important. He relates how Oehme visited a garden designed by him and saw that impatiens had been planted by the owner, which displeased the architect. When asked about this, he said: "This is my garden, not yours!".

== Awards and affiliations ==
Oehme was a member of the American Society of Landscape Architects. In 1992, he received the "Landscape Design Award" from the American Horticultural Society, 2002, the George Robert White Medal of Honor, and the 2011 Longhouse Award. He taught at the Universities of Pennsylvania and Georgia

== Published works ==
- with James Van Sweden: Gardening with Water: How James van Sweden and Wolfgang Oehme build and plant Fountains, swimming pools, Lily Ponds, water edges. Random House, New York 1994. ISBN 0-679-42946-8.
- with James Van Sweden: Bold Romantic Gardens. The New World Landscapes of Oehme van Sweden. (Photos by Susan Rademacher Fry). Spacemaker Press, Washington D.C. 1998. ISBN 1-888931-10-8.
- James van Sweden: Gardening with Nature: How James van Sweden and Wolfgang Oehme Plant Slopes, Meadows, Outdoor Rooms and Garden Screens. Random House, New York 1997. ISBN 0-679-42947-6.
- John Greenlee and Derek Fell: The Encyclopedia of Ornamental Grasses: How to grow and use over 250 beautiful and versatile Plants Rodale Books. Emmaus, 1992, ISBN 0-87596-100-2.
