= South Carolina Highway 128 =

State highway in South Carolina, United States

South Carolina Highway 128
- Savannah Highway

Route information
- Maintained by SCDOT
- Length: 2.110 mi (3.396 km)
- Existed: February 26, 2012–present

Major junctions
- West end: SC 170 in Port Royal
- East end: US 21 in Port Royal

Location
- Country: United States
- State: South Carolina
- Counties: Beaufort

Highway system
- South Carolina State Highway System; Interstate; US; State; Scenic
← SC 127	→ SC 129

South Carolina Highway 128 (SC 128), is a 2.110-mile (3.396 km) state highway located entirely within Beaufort County, South Carolina. Also known locally as Savannah Highway, SC 128 serves as a principal arterial for the unincorporated Shell Point as well as providing a southern route serving Port Royal, Marine Corps Recruit Depot Parris Island, and the Sea Islands east of Beaufort.

== Route description ==
SC 128 travels in a west-to-east direction and is a four-lane road for the entirety of its path. It alternates between traveling through the census-designated place of Shell Point and the town of Port Royal. SC 128 travels along the entirety of Savannah Highway. Beginning at an intersection with SC 170 just before the Broad River Bridge, SC 128 travels east towards its eastern terminus at U.S. Route 21 (US 21).

== History ==
Until 2012, SC 128 was signed as SC 802. With the re-routing of US 21 around Beaufort on February 26, 2012, the route for SC 802 was truncated to its current location on Lady's Island, thus resulting in the designation of SC 128 for the remaining portion of the old SC 802 route.

== Major Intersections ==
The entire route is in Port Royal, Beaufort County.

mi	km	Destinations	Notes
0.000	0.000	SC 170 – Beaufort, Okatie	Western terminus
2.110	3.396	US 21 – Beaufort, Pocotaligo	Eastern terminus
1.000 mi = 1.609 km; 1.000 km = 0.621 mi
