= U.S. Route 21 =

Highway in the United States

U.S. Route 21
- US 21 highlighted in red

Route information
- Maintained by SCDOT, NCDOT, and VDOT
- Length: 393 mi (632 km)
- Existed: November 11, 1926–present
- Tourist routes: McTeer Bridge Scenic Byway; US 21 Scenic Byway; SC Heritage Corridor: Discovery Route

Major junctions
- South end: Hunting Island State Park, SC
- I-95 near Yemassee, SC; I-26 (three times in SC); I-20 in Columbia, SC; I-77 (numerous times in SC/NC); I-85 in Charlotte, NC; I-40 in Statesville, NC
- North end: I-81 / US 52 in Wytheville, VA

Location
- Country: United States
- States: South Carolina, North Carolina, Virginia
- Counties: SC: Beaufort, Hampton, Colleton, Bamberg, Orangeburg, Calhoun, Lexington, Richland, Fairfield, Chester, York; NC: Mecklenburg, Iredell, Yadkin, Surry, Wilkes, Alleghany; VA: Grayson, Wythe

Highway system
- United States Numbered Highway System; List; Special; Divided
- South Carolina State Highway System; Interstate; US; State; Scenic
- North Carolina Highway System; Interstate; US; State; Scenic
- Virginia Routes; Interstate; US; Primary; Secondary; Byways; History; HOT lanes
← US 20	US	→ US 22
← SC 20	SC	→ SC 22
← NC 20	NC	→ NC 22
← SR 20	VA	→ SR 22

U.S. Route 21 or U.S. Highway 21 (US 21) is a north–south United States Numbered Highway, spanning 393 miles (632 km) from Hunting Island State Park, South Carolina, to Wytheville, Virginia. The route traverses three states, South Carolina, North Carolina, and Virginia. It connects southeastern cities, including Columbia, South Carolina, and Charlotte, North Carolina.

US 21 starts at Hunting Island State Park, bypasses Beaufort, South Carolina, and then heads north across the low country, paralleling Interstate 77 (I-77) through urban and rural areas before entering North Carolina. In North Carolina, US 21 frequently merges with and splits from I-77. The route enters Virginia, passing through hilly terrain before ending at the intersection of Interstate 81 (I-81) / U.S. Route 52 (US 52) in Wytheville.

Despite the "1" indicating that it is a major north–south highway, US 21 only travels through three states and is no longer a cross-country route, as many sections have been replaced by I-77 in Ohio and West Virginia. Historically, US 21 was longer before the Interstate Highway System was established. US 21 originally ran from Cleveland, Ohio, to Yemassee, South Carolina, it was later extended to Beaufort and Hunting Island State Park. Over time, its length was reduced, making it the second-shortest major north–south route after U.S. Route 91 (US 91).

US 21 serves as an alternative to the more heavily trafficked interstates in the area, particularly I-77, I-26, and I-95.

== Route description ==
Lengths
	mi	km
SC	233	375
NC	125	201
VA	35	56
Total	393	632

=== South Carolina ===
US 21 travels 233.5 miles (375.8 km) through the state. Beginning at Hunting Island State Park, US 21 travels west toward Beaufort, where it widens to four lanes. The route bypasses Beaufort to the south, going through Port Royal, Shell Point, and Burton. In the Beaufort area, US 21 passes by the entrances to Parris Island and Marine Corps Air Station Beaufort, the major Marine Corps installations in the area. North of Beaufort, US 21 continues as a four-lane divided highway and intersects with US 17. The route travels in a wrong-way concurrency with US 17 south for seven miles (11 km) before turning north toward Yemassee, where it becomes a rural two-lane road and intersects with US 17 Alternate. North of Yemassee, US 21 splits off and crosses I-95 at exit 42.

The two-lane route continues through rural portions of the state. US 21 goes through Smoaks and Branchville and bypasses Orangeburg. North of Orangeburg, US 21 runs roughly parallel to I-26 until Gaston where it conjoins US 321 and becomes an urban highway. US 21 passes through Cayce, West Columbia, and Columbia.

North of Columbia, US 21 splits from US 176 and US 321, before crossing I-20 at exit 71. Beyond I-20, US 21 reverts to a rural two-lane road parallel to I-77. In York County, US 21 enters urban areas again, connecting Rock Hill and Fort Mill. Near the North Carolina state line, US 21 merges with I-77 near Carowinds, then enters North Carolina.

=== North Carolina ===
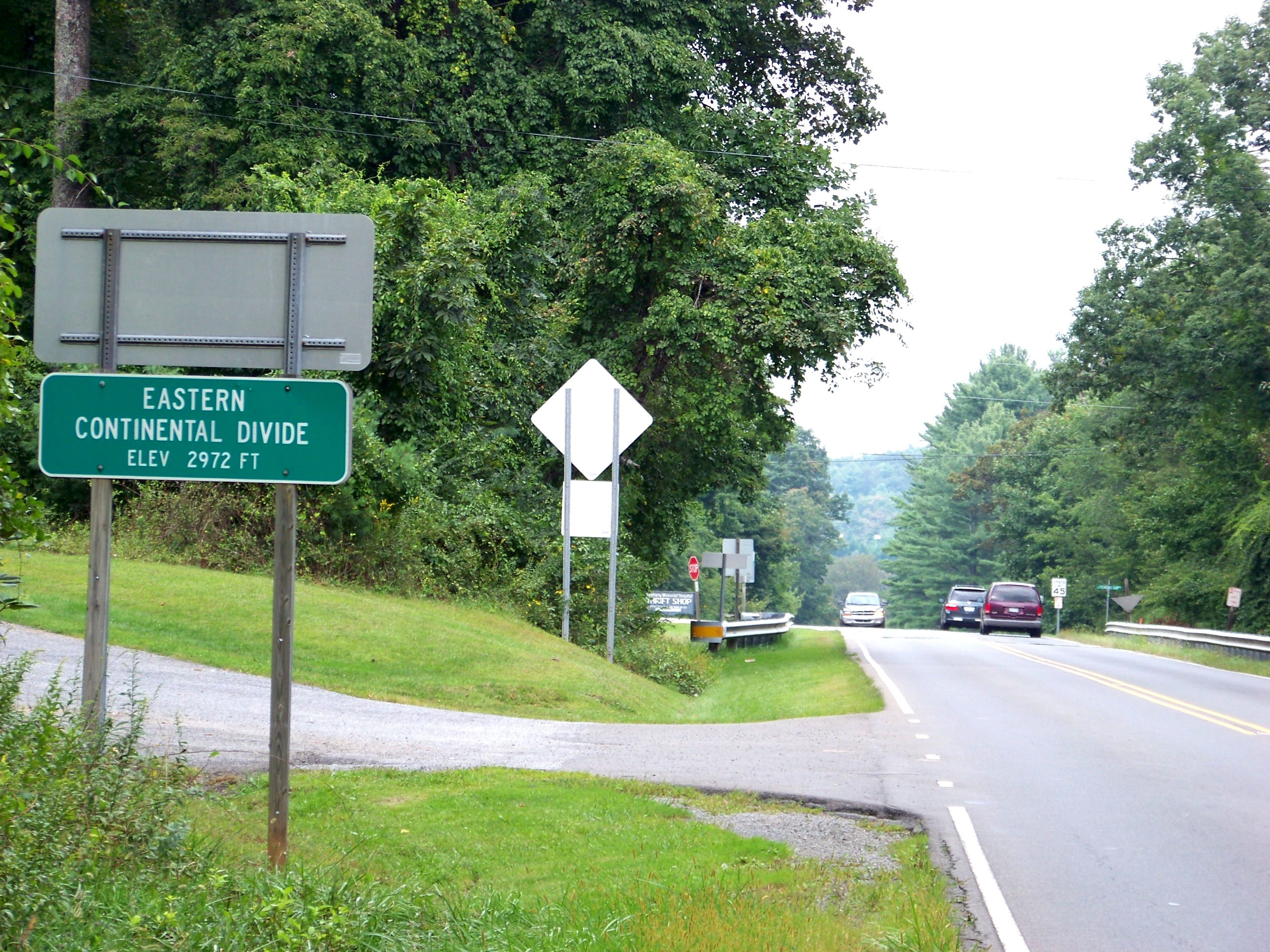
US 21 crossing the Eastern Continental Divide at Roaring Gap, North Carolina

US 21 begins as a concurrency with I-77 in Charlotte, which it repeats three times within the state. Its first break with I-77 is along Statesville Avenue, then proceeding through Huntersville and Cornelius, however, because of its close proximity to I-77 and North Carolina Highway 115 (NC 115), it has no interchange with I-485 by itself. The second break with I-77 occurs at Mooresville, where US 21 travels through the city and then northwest into Statesville. After Statesville, US 21 travels northeast to Harmony and Brooks Crossroads, before merging back with I-77 near Jonesville. However, Jonesville and Elkin connect with US 21 Bus. through centers of both towns, as an alternate route paralleling I-77. North of Elkin, US 21 splits with I-77 for the last time and goes north to Sparta, passing the Blue Ridge Parkway after a major, curvy section. North of Sparta, at Twin Oaks, US 221 overlaps with US 21 before entering Virginia. US 21 travels 124.5 miles (200.4 km) through the western Piedmont of North Carolina, either combined with I-77 or as a two-lane rural road; from the South Carolina state line to Elkin, travelers can easily skip a majority of US 21 via I-77.

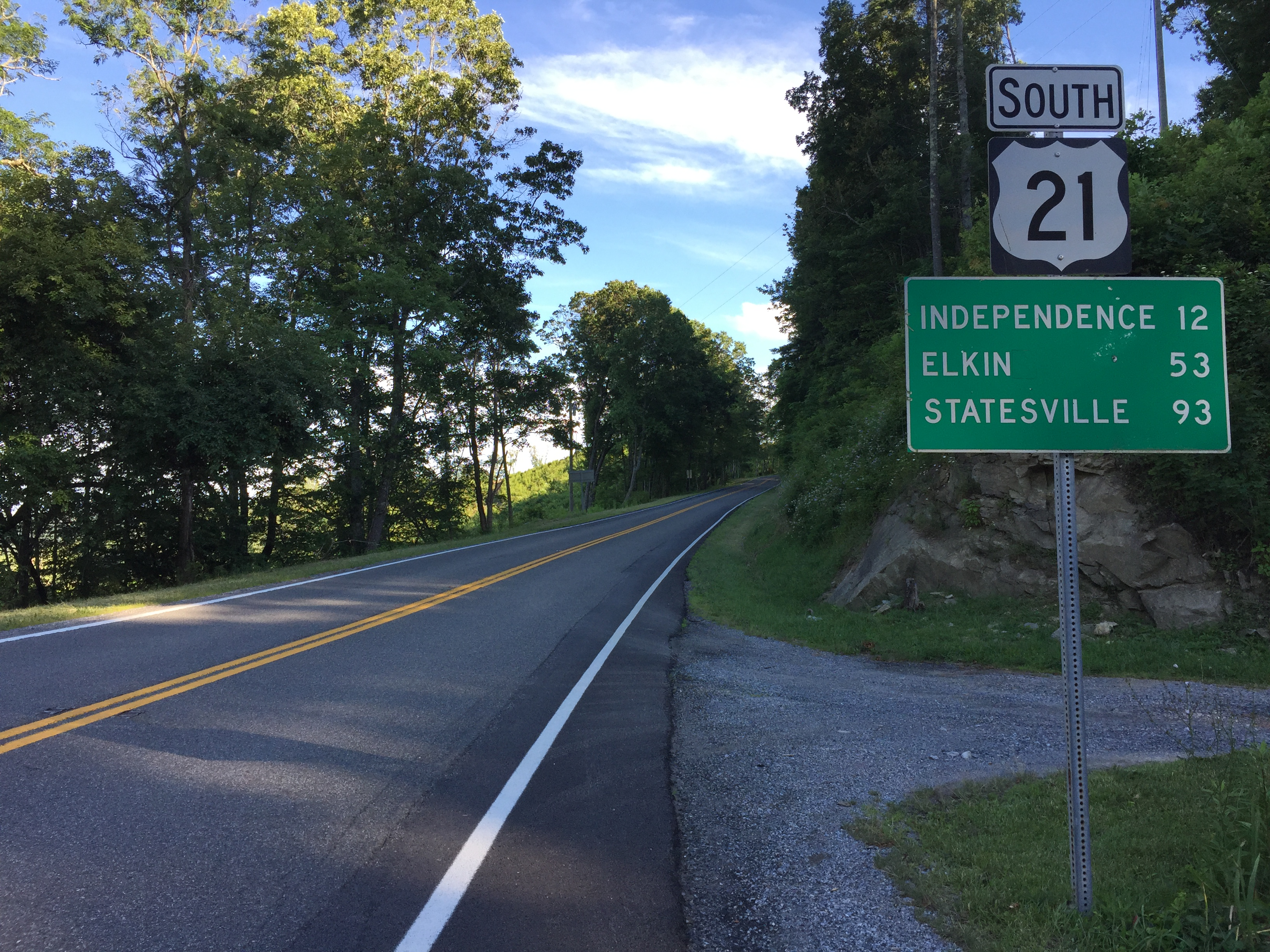
View south along US 21 at State Route 805 (SR 805) in Grayson County, Virginia

=== Virginia ===
After a few miles crossing the state line, US 21 reaches the town of Independence, where it splits with US 221 and continues north. The route goes through the Mount Rogers National Recreation Area before entering the city of Wytheville. After a short concurrency with US 11 in downtown Wytheville, it goes north and ends at the intersection of I-81/US 52. US 21 travels 35 miles (56 km) through western Virginia, mostly as a two-lane rural mountain road.

== History ==
US 21 in the pre-Interstate era was a north–south highway connecting the area around Lake Erie and the coastal South. One of the few true north–south routes to cross the middle Appalachian Mountains, it became an important corridor for motor traffic between northeastern Ohio, western Pennsylvania, (with US 19) and western New York with central North Carolina, central and southeastern South Carolina, and (by connecting with other highways) coastal Georgia and most of Florida. Many referred to the stretch of US 21 from the Great Lakes Region to Florida as "The Lakes-to-Florida Highway".

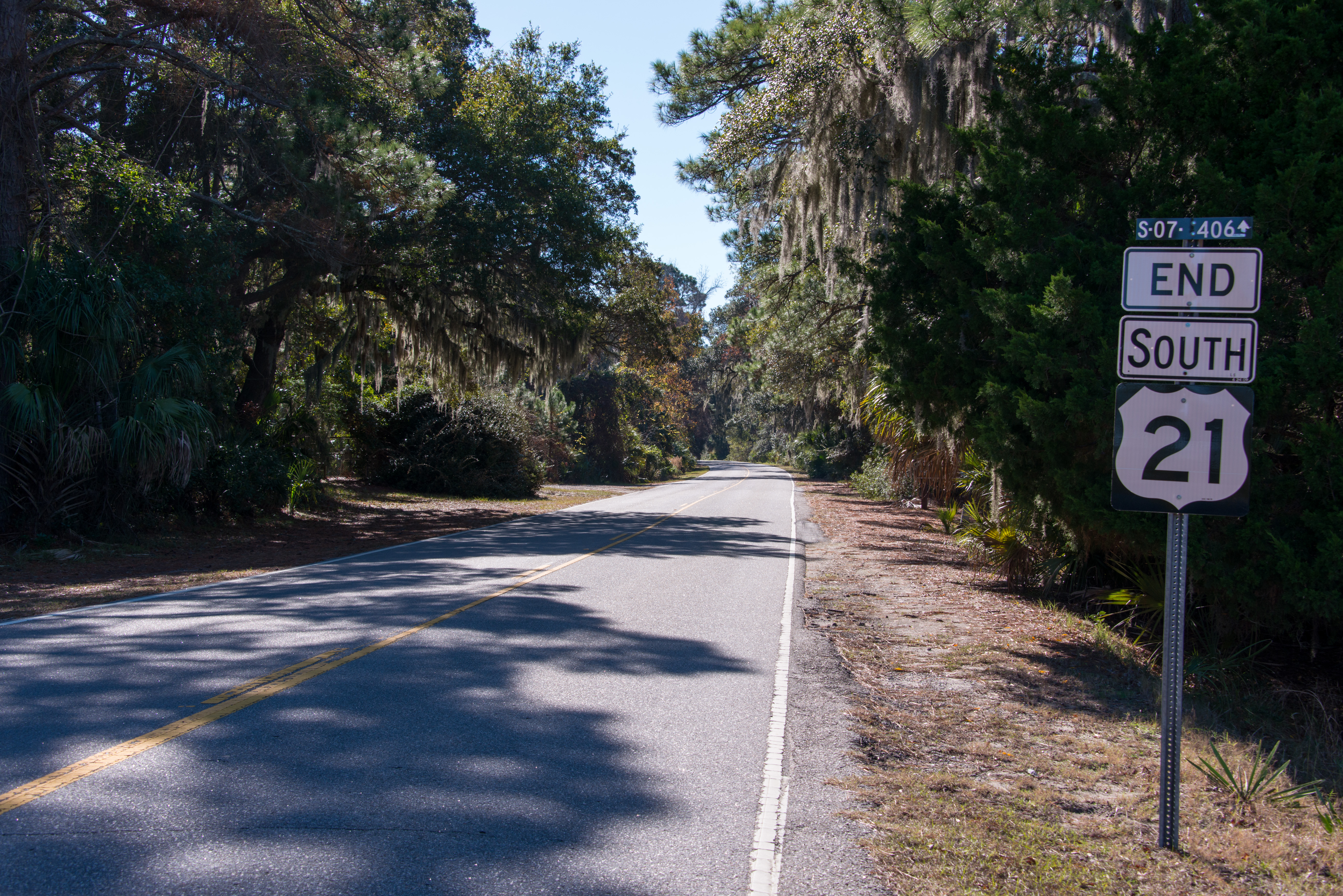
Southern terminus of US 21 at Hunting Island

US 21 originally (in 1926) connected Cleveland, Ohio, and Yemassee, South Carolina. In 1935 it was extended to Beaufort, South Carolina, and again in 1953 to its current southern terminus at the Atlantic Coast at Hunting Island State Park, between the city of Beaufort and Fripp Island.

In the Interstate Highway era, much of US 21 became an obvious corridor for a long-distance expressway. The West Virginia Turnpike between Charleston, West Virginia, and Princeton, West Virginia, was the first segment of a planned series of toll highways along or near US 21 from Cleveland to Charlotte, North Carolina. All the other toll highways were shelved in favor of freeways built with Interstate funding; these freeways and the West Virginia Turnpike became I-77, which completely supplanted old US 21 as a long-distance through route. I-77 was later extended to Columbia, South Carolina, also within a few miles of US 21.

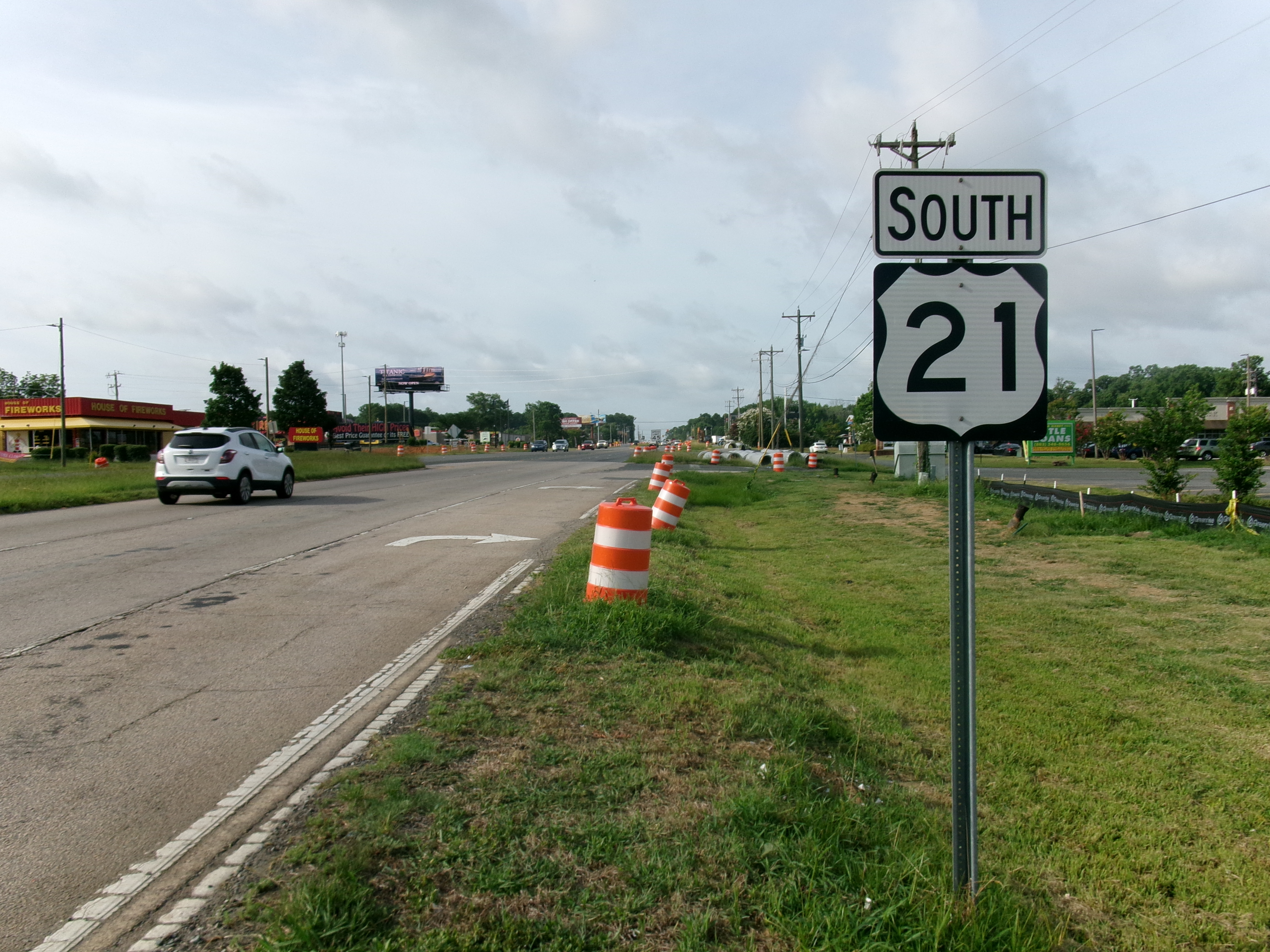
View south along US 21 past I-77 in Fort Mill, South Carolina

Between Cleveland and Charleston, all but a relatively short segment of US 21 was completely deleted in favor of I-77, the relics being as follows:

- State Route 21 (SR 21) between Cuyahoga Heights and Strasburg;
- SR 821 between I-77 near Byesville and SR 60 near Marietta, Ohio;
- County Road 35 (CR 35, Oakwood Road, Byesville Road, Old Twenty-One Road) between Byesville and the Guernsey–Tuscarawas county line;
- CR 3 (Salt Fork Road) between the Guernsey–Tuscarawas county line to SR 258
- CR 21 between Newcomerstown and New Philadelphia
- County Route 21 (CR 21) between Mineral Wells and Charleston.

Between Charleston and its current northern terminus at Wytheville, Virginia, almost all of US 21 ran concurrently with either US 60, US 19, or US 52, which remained as US 21 was deleted. The short segment of US 21 in southern West Virginia not coinciding with another U.S. Highway became an extension of West Virginia Route 16.

In North Carolina, US 21 originally entered the state along today's NC 51 into Pineville, then followed Old Pineville Road into Charlotte. In the mid-1930s, US 21 moved over to South Boulevard from Old Pineville Road. In 1969, US 21 was rerouted following today's I-77 alignment, the old route was replaced by an extension of US 521. From 1975–1987, US 21 moved north in segments onto I-77 to its current alignment ending at exit 16A (Sunset Road). Further north, US 21 originally followed Old Statesville Road, replaced in 1956 by NC 115. In 1966, US 21 was bypassed around Jonesville and Elkin, replaced with US 21 Bus.

US 21 in Beaufort, South Carolina, was rerouted around the city over former SC 280 as well as a portion of SC 802. The new routing went into effect on February 26, 2012.

Browse numbered routes
← US 20A	OH	→ SR 21

== Major intersections ==
State	County	Location	mi	km	Exit	Destinations	Notes
South Carolina	Beaufort	Hunting Island State Park	0.00	0.00		Sea Island Parkway / Campground Road	Southern terminus; road continues as Sea Island Parkway
South Carolina	Beaufort	Lady's Island	14.50	23.34		US 21 Bus. north (Sea Island Parkway west) / SC 802 east (Sams Point Road)	Southern terminus of US 21 Bus.; western terminus of SC 802
South Carolina	Beaufort	Port Royal	17.35	27.92		SC 281 north (Ribaut Road north)	Southern terminus of SC 281
South Carolina	Beaufort	Port Royal	19.87	31.98		Parris Island M.C.R.D.	Interchange
South Carolina	Beaufort	Port Royal	21.10	33.96		SC 128 west (Savannah Highway) – Bluffton, Hardeeville, Hilton Head Island	Eastern terminus of SC 128
South Carolina	Beaufort	Beaufort	24.24	39.01		SC 170 (Robert Smalls Parkway) – Beaufort	
South Carolina	Beaufort	Burton	25.44	40.94		US 21 Bus. south – Beaufort	Northern terminus of US 21 Bus.
South Carolina	Beaufort	Burton	26.86	43.23		SC 116 west – Laurel Bay	Eastern terminus of SC 116
South Carolina	Beaufort	Gardens Corner	37.40	60.19		US 17 north – Charleston	Interchange; eastern end of US 17 concurrency
South Carolina	Beaufort	Pocotaligo	44.00	70.81		US 17 Alt. begins / US 17 south to I-95 – Ridgeland, Savannah	Western end of US 17 concurrency; southern end of US 17 Alt. concurrency; southern terminus of US 17 Alt.
South Carolina	Hampton	Yemassee	47.77	76.88		SC 68 west (Connely Street) / Flowers Street south (US 17 Conn. south) to I-95 – Hampton, Allendale	Eastern terminus of SC 68; northern terminus of US 17 Conn.
South Carolina	Colleton		49.39	79.49		US 17 Alt. north (Hendersonville Highway) – Walterboro	Northern end of US 17 Alt. concurrency
South Carolina	Colleton		52.04	83.75		I-95 – Florence, Savannah	I-95 exit 42
South Carolina	Colleton		62.00	99.78		SC 63 (Sniders Highway) – Varnville, Walterboro	
South Carolina	Colleton	Bells Crossroads	68.41	110.10		SC 64 (Bells Highway) – Ehrhardt, Walterboro	
South Carolina	Colleton	Smoaks	77.10	124.08		SC 217 (Lodge Highway) – Lodge	
South Carolina	Bamberg	Whetstone Crossroads	83.20	133.90		SC 61 (Edisto River Road) – Bamberg	
South Carolina	Orangeburg	Branchville	88.65	142.67		US 78 west (Edward Street) – Bamberg	Southern end of US 78 concurrency
South Carolina	Orangeburg	Branchville	88.85	142.99		US 78 east (Dorange Road) – Charleston	Northern end of US 78 concurrency
South Carolina	Orangeburg	Branchville	89.26	143.65		SC 210 north – Bowman	Southern terminus of SC 210
South Carolina	Orangeburg	Orangeburg	104.16	167.63		US 21 Bus. north (Rowesville Road) / Stonewall Jackson Boulevard (US 601 Truck north / SC 4 west)	Southern end of US 601 Truck concurrency; southern terminus of US 21 Bus.; eastern terminus of SC 4
South Carolina	Orangeburg	Orangeburg	104.23	167.74		US 178 east (Charleston Highway east) / US 178 Bus. west (Charleston Highway west) – Charleston	Southern end of US 178 concurrency; eastern terminus of US 178 Bus.
South Carolina	Orangeburg	Orangeburg	105.55	169.87		US 301 (Five Chop Road) – Santee, Bamberg	
South Carolina	Orangeburg	Orangeburg	105.65	170.03		SC 33 (Russel Street) – Cameron	
South Carolina	Orangeburg	Orangeburg	107.50	173.00		US 601 (Magnolia Street) / US 601 Truck ends – St. Matthews, Bamberg	Northern end of US 601 Truck concurrency; northern terminus of US 601 Truck
South Carolina	Orangeburg	Orangeburg	108.59	174.76		US 178 west (Chestnut Street) / Columbia Road south (US 21 Conn. south) – North	Northern end of US 178 concurrency; northern terminus of US 21 Conn.; US 21 turns right off of Chestnut Street and onto Columbia Road.
South Carolina	Calhoun		120.48	193.89		SC 172 – North	
South Carolina	Calhoun		120.58	194.05		SC 6 east to I-26	Southern end of SC 6 concurrency
South Carolina	Calhoun		122.15	196.58		SC 6 north (Center Hill Road) – Swansea	Northern end of SC 6 concurrency
South Carolina	Lexington		127.48	205.16		I-26 – Columbia, Charleston	I-26 exit 129
South Carolina	Calhoun	Sandy Run	130.23	209.58		US 176 east (Old State Road) – St. Matthews	Southern end of US 176 concurrency
South Carolina	Lexington		137.13	220.69		I-26 – Columbia, Charleston	I-26 exit 119
South Carolina	Lexington		138.98	223.67		US 321 south – Gaston, Swansea	Southern end of US 321 concurrency
South Carolina	Lexington	Cayce	141.48	227.69		I-77 north – Charlotte	I-77 exit 1
South Carolina	Lexington	Cayce	141.87	228.32		I-26 – Charleston, Spartanburg	I-26 exit 115
South Carolina	Lexington	Cayce	142.97	230.09		SC 2 north (Frink Road)	Southern terminus of SC 2
South Carolina	Lexington	West Columbia	144.45	232.47		SC 302 south (Airport Boulevard) – Aiken, Columbia Airport	Northern terminus of SC 302
South Carolina	Lexington	Cayce	146.23	235.33		SC 2 (State Street)	
South Carolina	Richland	Columbia	147.22	236.93		SC 48 Truck east (Blossom Street / US 21 Conn. east / US 76 Conn. east) to US 76 east / US 378 east	Western terminus of US 21 Conn., US 76 Conn., and SC 48 Truck; US 21, US 176, and US 321 turn left off of Blossom Street and onto Huger Street.
South Carolina	Richland	Columbia	147.86	237.96		US 1 / US 378 (Gervais Street) – South Carolina State Museum, Confederate Relic Room, EdVenture, Columbia SC Visitors Center, Convention Center, Colonial Life Arena	
South Carolina	Richland	Columbia	148.16	238.44		SC 12 east (Hampton Street) – Fort Jackson	One-way couplet
South Carolina	Richland	Columbia	148.26	238.60		SC 12 west (Taylor Street) – Lexington	One-way couplet
South Carolina	Richland	Columbia	148.76	239.41		I-126 west / US 76 west to I-20 – Greenville, Spartanburg	Southern end of I-126/US 76 concurrency; Rep. T. Moffatt Burriss Sr. Interchange
South Carolina	Richland	Columbia	149.08	239.92		I-126 ends	Northern end of I-126 concurrency
South Carolina	Richland	Columbia	149.38	240.40		SC 48 east (Assembly Street) – Columbia Museum of Art	Western terminus of SC 48
South Carolina	Richland	Columbia	149.46	240.53		US 76 east (Elmwood Avenue)	Northern end of US 76 concurrency
South Carolina	Richland	Columbia	149.97	241.35		US 176 west (River Drive)	Northern end of US 176 concurrency
South Carolina	Richland	Columbia	150.66	242.46		SC 16 (Sunset Drive)	
South Carolina	Richland	Columbia	151.23	243.38		SC 215 north (Monticello Road)	Southern terminus of SC 215
South Carolina	Richland	Columbia	152.22	244.97		US 321 north (Fairfield Street) – Winnsboro	Northern end of US 321 concurrency
South Carolina	Richland	Columbia	154.76	249.06		I-20 – Florence, Augusta	I-20 exit 71
South Carolina	Richland	Blythewood	162.17	260.99		I-77 – Columbia, Charlotte	I-77 exit 24
South Carolina	Richland	Blythewood	163.46	263.06		SC 555 (Farrow Road) – Columbia	
South Carolina	Fairfield		171.40	275.84		Coleman Highway west (US 21 Conn. north) – Winnsboro	Southern terminus of US 21 Conn.; eastern terminus of Coleman Highway
South Carolina	Fairfield	Ridgeway	172.09	276.95		SC 34 east (Palmer Street) – Lugoff, Camden	Southern end of SC 34 concurrency
South Carolina	Fairfield	Ridgeway	172.31	277.31		SC 34 west (Church Street) – Winnsboro Mills	Northern end of SC 34 concurrency
South Carolina	Fairfield		189.11	304.34		SC 200 – Winnsboro	Southern end of SC 200 concurrency
South Carolina	Chester	Great Falls	192.07	309.11		SC 99 north (Chester Avenue) – Richburg	Southern terminus of SC 99
South Carolina	Chester	Great Falls	193.29	311.07		SC 97 north – Chester	Southern end of SC 97 concurrency
South Carolina	Chester	Great Falls	193.43	311.30		SC 97 south / SC 200 north – Lancaster	Northern end of SC 97 and SC 200 concurrencies
South Carolina	Chester	Fort Lawn	200.93	323.37		SC 9 (Chester Avenue) – Richburg, Lancaster	
South Carolina	Chester		206.23	331.90		SC 223 (Wylies Mill Road) – Richburg	
South Carolina	York		213.55	343.68		SC 5 south – Lancaster	Interchange; southern end of SC 5 concurrency; to Andrew Jackson State Park
South Carolina	York	Lesslie	215.67	347.09		Lesslie	Interchange via connector road
South Carolina	York	Rock Hill	217.26	349.65		Lesslie, Red River	Interchange
South Carolina	York	Rock Hill	218.02	350.87		I-77 – Columbia, Charlotte	I-77 exit 77
South Carolina	York	Rock Hill	218.72	352.00		SC 5 / SC 121 (Main Street)	Access to Piedmont Medical Center; northern end of SC 5 concurrency; southern end of SC 121 concurrency
South Carolina	York	Rock Hill	220.20	354.38		SC 122 (Dave Lyle Boulevard) to I-77	Interchange
South Carolina	York	Rock Hill	222.36	357.85		SC 322 west (Cherry Road west) / SC 121 ends	Northern end of SC 121 concurrency; northern terminus of SC 121; eastern terminus of SC 322
South Carolina	York	Rock Hill	222.80	358.56		I-77 – Columbia, Charlotte	I-77 exit 82
South Carolina	York	Rock Hill	223.00	358.88		SC 161 north (Celanese Road) to I-77 north – Charlotte, York	Southern terminus of SC 161
South Carolina	York	Fort Mill	224.37	361.09		US 21 Bus. north (Spratt Street) – Fort Mill	Southern terminus of US 21 Bus.
South Carolina	York	Fort Mill	226.42	364.39		SC 160 – Tega Cay	
South Carolina	York	Fort Mill	229.20	368.86		SC 460 (Springfield Parkway) – Tega Cay, Fort Mill	
South Carolina	York	Fort Mill	230.35	370.71		US 21 Bus. south (Old Nation Road)	Northern terminus of US 21 Bus.
South Carolina	York	Fort Mill	231.14	371.98		SC 51 north (Pineville–Rock Hill Road) – Pineville	Southern terminus of SC 51 (northern segment)
South Carolina	York	Fort Mill	231.89	373.19		I-77 south – Columbia	Southern end of I-77 concurrency; I-77 exit 90
			232.52 0.00	374.20 0.00		South Carolina–North Carolina line	
North Carolina	Mecklenburg	Charlotte	0.9	1.4	1A	Westinghouse Boulevard	Exit numbers follow I-77
North Carolina	Mecklenburg	Charlotte	1.8	2.9	1B	I-485 – Huntersville, Pineville	Formerly exit 2 (southbound) before August 2010; I-485 exit 67
North Carolina	Mecklenburg	Charlotte	2.8	4.5	3	Arrowood Road	Formerly exit 2 (northbound) before August 2010
North Carolina	Mecklenburg	Charlotte	3.7	6.0	4	Nations Ford Road	
North Carolina	Mecklenburg	Charlotte	4.8	7.7	5	Tyvola Road	Single-point urban interchange
North Carolina	Mecklenburg	Charlotte	6.0	9.7	6A	Woodlawn Road south (Charlotte Route 4 east) – Queens University	To Pfeiffer University
North Carolina	Mecklenburg	Charlotte	6.2	10.0	6B	To NC 49 (S. Tryon Street) / Billy Graham Parkway (Charlotte Route 4 west)	To Billy Graham Library and Charlotte Douglas International Airport; southbound signed as NC 49 south (S. Tryon St. south) only
North Carolina	Mecklenburg	Charlotte	7.3	11.7	7	To NC 49 / Clanton Road	
North Carolina	Mecklenburg	Charlotte	8.3	13.4	8	To NC 160 / Remount Road	Northbound exit and southbound entrance
North Carolina	Mecklenburg	Charlotte	9.0	14.5	9A	NC 160 (West Boulevard)	Southbound exit and northbound entrance; access from collector-distributor lanes
North Carolina	Mecklenburg	Charlotte	9.4	15.1	9B	I-277 north / US 74 east (John Belk Freeway)	Access from collector-distributor lanes; I-277 exits 1B-C
North Carolina	Mecklenburg	Charlotte	9.5	15.3	9C	US 74 west (Wilkinson Boulevard) to US 29 / NC 27	US 29 and NC 27 signed northbound only; access from collector-distributor lanes; US 74 exits 1B-C
North Carolina	Mecklenburg	Charlotte	9.9	15.9	10A	US 29 / NC 27 (Morehead Street)	Southbound exit and northbound entrance
North Carolina	Mecklenburg	Charlotte	10.4	16.7	10	Trade Street / Fifth Street	Signed southbound as exits 10B (Trade Street east) and 10C (Fifth Street/Trade Street west)
North Carolina	Mecklenburg	Charlotte	11.0	17.7	11A	I-277 south / NC 16 south (Brookshire Freeway east) – Downtown Charlotte	I-277 exits 5A-B
North Carolina	Mecklenburg	Charlotte	11.2	18.0	11B	NC 16 north (Brookshire Freeway west)	Left exit northbound; NC 16 exits 5A-B
North Carolina	Mecklenburg	Charlotte			—	I-77 north (Express lanes)	Southern terminus of HOV3+/toll lanes
North Carolina	Mecklenburg	Charlotte			—	I-277 south	Express lanes only, southbound exit and northbound entrance
North Carolina	Mecklenburg	Charlotte	12.4	20.0	12	Lasalle Street / Atando Avenue	
North Carolina	Mecklenburg	Charlotte	13.3	21.4	13	I-85 – Greensboro, Spartanburg	Signed as exits 13A (north) and 13B (south); hybrid interchange; I-85 exit 38
North Carolina	Mecklenburg	Charlotte			—	I-85 north	Express lanes only; northbound exit and southbound entrance
North Carolina	Mecklenburg	Charlotte	15.8	25.4		I-77 north – Statesville	Northern end of I-77 concurrency; I-77 exit 16
North Carolina	Mecklenburg	Charlotte	16.3	26.2		NC 115 north (Old Statesville Road)	Southern terminus of NC 115
North Carolina	Mecklenburg	Charlotte	18.9	30.4		NC 24 (W.T. Harris Boulevard)	To Northlake Mall
North Carolina	Mecklenburg	Huntersville				Alexandriana Road to I-485	
North Carolina	Mecklenburg	Huntersville	25.7	41.4		NC 73 (Sam Furr Road) – Concord	
North Carolina	Mecklenburg	Cornelius	28.8	46.3		I-77 south – Charlotte	Southern end of I-77 concurrency; I-77 exit 28
North Carolina	Mecklenburg	Davidson	30.2	48.6	30	Griffith Street – Davidson	Exit numbers follow I-77
North Carolina	Lake Norman				Lake Norman Causeway		
North Carolina	Iredell	Mooresville	32.1	51.7	31	Langtree Road	
North Carolina	Iredell	Mooresville	33.7	54.2		I-77 north – Statesville	Northern end of I-77 concurrency; I-77 exit 33
North Carolina	Iredell	Mooresville	36.4	58.6		NC 150 (Plaza Drive)	Interchange
North Carolina	Iredell	Mooresville	39.1	62.9		NC 115 south (Statesville Highway)	Southern end of NC 115 concurrency
North Carolina	Iredell		43.3	69.7		I-77 – Charlotte, Statesville	I-77 exit 42
North Carolina	Iredell	Statesville	51.2	82.4		US 70 (Garner Bagnal Boulevard) – Conover, Salisbury	
North Carolina	Iredell	Statesville	51.9	83.5		US 64 west (Front Street) / NC 115 north (Center Street)	Northern end of NC 115 concurrency; southern end of US 64 concurrency
North Carolina	Iredell	Statesville	52.3	84.2		NC 90 west (Water Street)	Eastern terminus of NC 90
North Carolina	Iredell	Statesville	53.2	85.6		US 64 east (Davie Avenue) – Mocksville	Northern end of US 64 concurrency
North Carolina	Iredell	Statesville	54.1	87.1		I-40 – Hickory, Winston-Salem	I-40 exit 151
North Carolina	Iredell		57.2	92.1		I-77 – Statesville, Elkin	I-77 exit 54
North Carolina	Iredell	Harmony	66.9	107.7		NC 901 (Memorial Highway) – Union Grove	
North Carolina	Yadkin	Brooks Crossroads	79.2	127.5		US 421 – Wilkesboro, Yadkinville, Winston-Salem	
North Carolina	Yadkin		85.4	137.4		I-77 south / US 21 Bus. north – Statesville, Jonesville	Southern end of I-77 concurrency; I-77 exit 79; southern terminus of US 21 Bus.
North Carolina	Yadkin	Jonesville	88.5	142.4	82	NC 67 – Jonesville, Boonville, Elkin	Exit number follows I-77
North Carolina	Yadkin River				Sgt. Gregory Keith Martin Memorial Bridges		
North Carolina	Surry	Elkin	90.3	145.3		I-77 north – Wytheville	Northern end of I-77 concurrency; southbound exit and northbound entrance; I-77 exit 83
North Carolina	Surry	Elkin	91.3	146.9		NC 268 Byp. to I-77 north – Elkin	Interchange; to Elkin Municipal Airport; I-77 exit 85
North Carolina	Surry	Elkin	92.8	149.3		US 21 Bus. south – Elkin	Northern terminus of US 21 Bus.
North Carolina	Wilkes	No major junctions					
North Carolina	Alleghany		111.2	179.0		Blue Ridge Parkway	Interchange via connector roads
North Carolina	Alleghany	Sparta	118.2	190.2		NC 18 (Whitehead Street) – Laurel Springs	
North Carolina	Alleghany	Twin Oaks	121.1	194.9		US 221 south – Jefferson	Southern end of US 221 concurrency
			124.3 0.00	200.0 0.00		North Carolina–Virginia line	
Virginia	Grayson	Independence	3.86	6.21		US 221 north / US 58 (Main Street) – Mouth of Wilson, Galax	Northern end of US 221 concurrency
Virginia	Grayson	Elk Creek	14.77	23.77		SR 658 (Comers Rock Road) – Comers Rock	
Virginia	Grayson		15.67	25.22		SR 805 (Spring Valley Road) to SR 94 – Fries	
Virginia	Wythe	Speedwell	21.26	34.21		SR 619 (Saint Peters Road) / SR 749 (Cedar Springs Road) – Cedar Springs, Rural Retreat	
Virginia	Wythe		26.03	41.89		SR 690 (Crockett Road, Cripple Creek Road) – Crockett, Cripple Creek	
Virginia	Wythe		31.13	50.10		SR 696 (Barrett Mill Road) – Big Survey Wildlife Management Area	
Virginia	Wythe	Wytheville	33.63	54.12		US 11 south (Lee Highway)	Southern end of US 11 concurrency
Virginia	Wythe	Wytheville	33.94	54.62		US 11 north (Main Street)	Northern end of US 11 concurrency
Virginia	Wythe	Wytheville	34.99	56.31		I-81 / US 52 to I-77 – Bristol, Roanoke	Northern terminus; I-81 exit 70; road continues west as US 52 (4th Street north)
1.000 mi = 1.609 km; 1.000 km = 0.621 mi: Concurrency terminus; HOV only; Incomplete access

== Special routes and auxiliary routes ==
There are currently four business loops, four connectors, and one truck route along its route.

- U.S. Route 21 Business (Beaufort, South Carolina)
- U.S. Route 21 Business (Orangeburg, South Carolina)
- U.S. Route 21 Connector (Orangeburg, South Carolina)
- U.S. Route 21 Connector (West Columbia, South Carolina)
- U.S. Route 21 Connector (Columbia, South Carolina)
- U.S. Route 21 Connector (Ridgeway, South Carolina)
- U.S. Route 21 Business (Fort Mill, South Carolina)
- U.S. Route 21 Business (Elkin, North Carolina)
- U.S. Route 21 Truck (Sparta, North Carolina)

Auxiliary routes of US 21:

- U.S. Route 121 (Proposed)
- U.S. Route 221
- U.S. Route 321
- U.S. Route 421
- U.S. Route 521

== See also ==
- Blue Ridge Parkway
- Catawba River
- Carowinds
- Congaree River
- Hunting Island State Park
- Lake Norman
- Lake Norman State Park
- Lake Wateree
- Lake Wateree State Recreation Area
- Marine Corps Air Station Beaufort
- Mount Rogers National Recreation Area
- New River
- North Carolina Bicycle Route 4
- Stone Mountain State Park
- Uptown Charlotte
- Yadkin River
