= United States Naval Hospital Beaufort =

Hospital in South Carolina, United States

- Part of Navy Medicine East
- 1 Pinckney Boulevard, Beaufort, South Carolina 29902-6148
- Camp Saxton Site and Fort Frederick Heritage Preserve
- U.S. National Register of Historic Places
- Location within South Carolina
- Coordinates: 32°23′6″N 80°40′46″W
- NRHP reference No.: 74001826

Site information
- Type: Military base
- Controlled by: Bureau of Medicine and Surgery, United States Navy

Location
- Coordinates: 32°23′20″N 80°40′57″W

Site history
- Built: 1949

Naval Hospital Beaufort is a United States Navy hospital located in Beaufort, South Carolina.

== History ==
Commissioned on April 29, 1949, the hospital is one of only a handful of its kind that sits within its own complex rather than within a larger base. It takes its name from Beaufort, the larger community north of Port Royal that is commonly associated with military installations in the Lowcountry region.

== Function ==
NH Beaufort serves nearby Marine Corps bases MCRD Parris Island and MCAS Beaufort, including the housing area of Laurel Bay.
