= Spring Island =

Coordinates: 32.326°N 80.824°W

- Island
- Interactive map of Spring Island
- Website: http://www.springisland.com

Spring Island is a nature preserve and island residential community in Beaufort County, South Carolina. It is a 3000-acre coastal Sea Island that consists of live oak forest interwoven with waterfront homes.

== Amenities ==
- Two clubhouses
- Two onsite restaurants
- Award-winning golf
- Equestrian center
- Salt water and fresh water fishing
- Kayaking
- Deep water docks
- Over 300 trails
- 13,000 sq. ft. sports complex
- Swimming pools
- Tennis courts
- 4 acre farm with garden plots
- Nature center
- Sporting clays
- Croquet
