= Beaufort County, South Carolina =

County in South Carolina, United States

- County
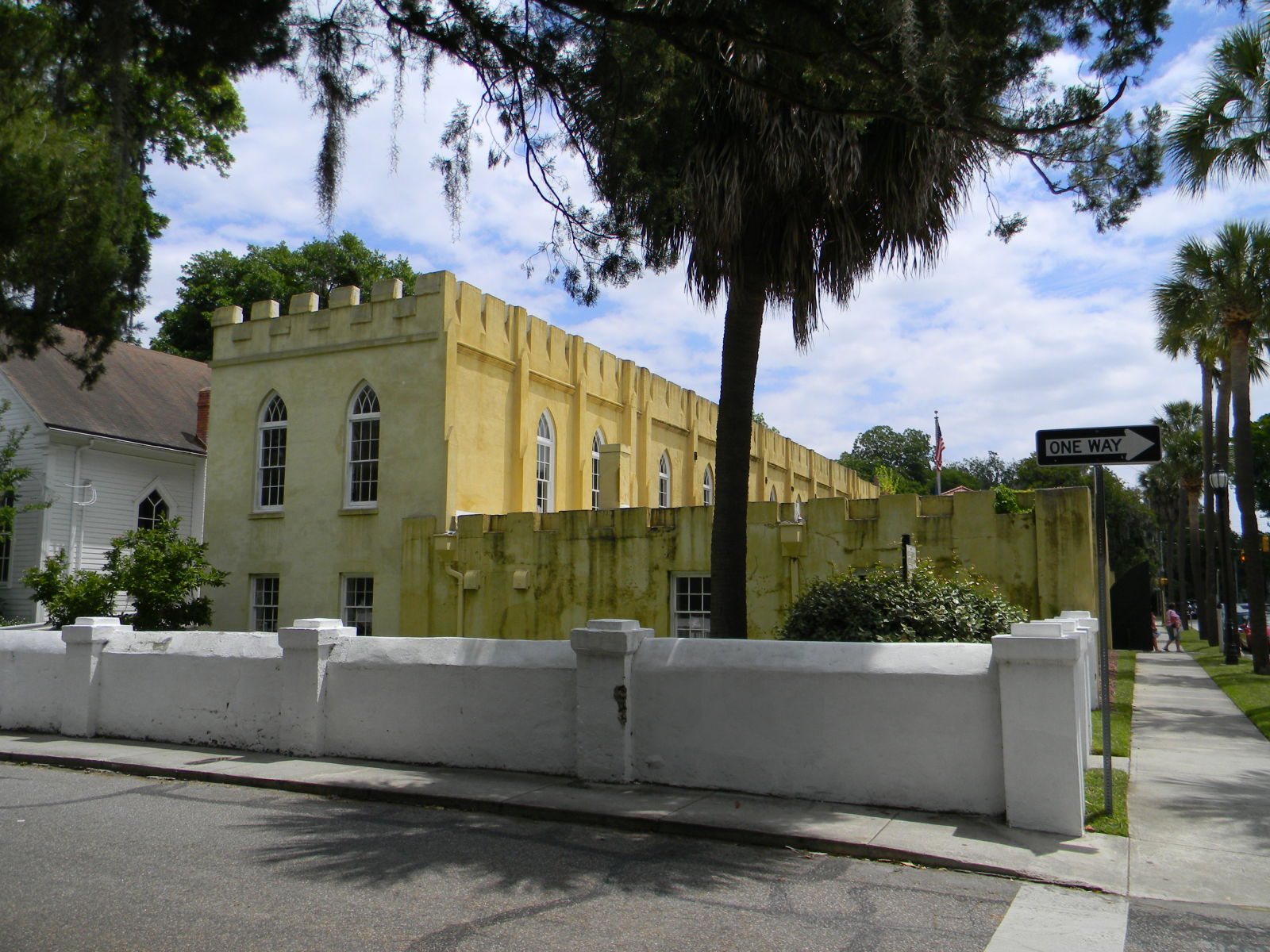
- The Arsenal in Beaufort Historic District

- Flag Seal
- Motto: "Heritage By The Sea"
- Location within the U.S. state of South Carolina
- Interactive map of Beaufort County, South Carolina
- Coordinates: 32.36°N 80.69°W
- Country: United States
- State: South Carolina
- Founded: 1711
- Named for: Henry Somerset, 2nd Duke of Beaufort
- Seat: Beaufort
- Largest community: Hilton Head Island

Area
  - Total: 923.48 sq mi (2,391.8 km^{2})
  - Land: 576.04 sq mi (1,491.9 km^{2})
  - Water: 347.44 sq mi (899.9 km^{2}) 37.62%

Population (2020)
  - Total: 187,117
  - Estimate (2025): 204,433 ▲
  - Density: 324.83/sq mi (125.42/km^{2})
- Time zone: UTC−5 (Eastern)
  - Summer (DST): UTC−4 (EDT)
- Congressional district: 1st
- Website: beaufortcountysc.gov

Beaufort County (/ˈbjuːfərt/ BEW-fərt) is a county in the U.S. state of South Carolina. As of the 2020 census, its population was 187,117. Its county seat is Beaufort and its largest community is Hilton Head Island.

Beaufort County is part of the Hilton Head Island-Bluffton-Port Royal metropolitan statistical area. It is one of the South's fastest-growing counties, primarily because of development south of the Broad River clustered along the U.S. Highway 278 corridor. The county's northern portions also have grown steadily, due in part to the strong federal military presence around the city of Beaufort. The county's two portions are connected by the Broad River Bridge, which carries South Carolina Highway 170. Beaufort County has been identified as the most at-risk county in the contiguous United States for combined damage from climate change in the medium term, largely due to high wet-bulb temperatures, economic and farm crop damages, and sea-level rise.

== History ==
From the early days of plantations, African slaves outnumbered the European minority in the colony. The plantations on the Sea Islands had large concentrations of slaves who had infrequent and limited interaction with white people. The islands were sites of the development of the Gullah culture, which preserved elements from a variety of West African roots; the people also developed the Gullah language, a creole language. The county was majority black until around the mid-20th century.

Union troops took control of Beaufort County and occupied the area beginning in 1861. Many slaves escaped and went to Union lines. In some cases, planters had moved inland for refuge, leaving their slaves on the Sea Islands. Slaves began to organize schools and other parts of their communities early in the war in this county, especially on the islands. The Army founded Mitchellville on Hilton Head by March 1863 as a village where black people could practice self-governance; by 1865, it had 1,500 residents. After the war, the Drayton family reclaimed this land for their own private use. In some cases, the Union Army allocated plots for blacks for housing and cultivating crops.

When freedmen were granted citizenship and the franchise after the American Civil War by constitutional amendments, most joined the Republican Party. Although not the only majority black state, South Carolina was the only Southern state during Reconstruction to elect a black majority of representatives to the state legislature. Beaufort County had many prominent black leaders, such as Robert Smalls, Jonathan Jasper Wright, William James Whipper, Julius I. Washington, and Thomas E. Miller.

Increasing violence during election campaigns in the state from 1868 on was used by white insurgents and paramilitary groups to suppress black voting; results were also dependent on fraud. In 1876, the Democrats regained control of the state legislature and governor's office, although results were disputed. While black Republicans continued to be elected to local office in Beaufort County and other areas through the next decades, in 1895, the Democrat-dominated state legislature passed a new constitution that effectively disfranchised most black citizens by making voter registration and voting more difficult. They were excluded from the political system and kept in second-class status for decades. In 1903, the county "was reported to have 3,434 literate black males to 927 whites", but due to the discriminatory practices, nearly all black citizens were barred from voting.

From 1900 through 1950, Beaufort County's economy suffered from the decline in agriculture, which together with oppressive social conditions of Jim Crow contributed to many African Americans making a Great Migration out of the South. African Americans went to northern and midwestern industrial cities for jobs and became an urbanized population. The total county population of 35,495 in 1900 dropped by more than one-third in 1930, and did not reach the 1900 population level again until well after 1950, when the population was 26,933. Southern Democrats in Congress helped gain the establishment of military installations in the county and state, which added more population and stimulated area jobs in the second half of the 20th century. In addition, vacation and resort areas were developed that attracted increasing numbers of tourists through the winter season, and then others all year-round as retirees.

== Geography ==
According to the U.S. Census Bureau, the county has a total area of 923.48 square miles (2,391.8 km^{2}), of which 347.44 sq mi (899.9 km^{2}) (37.62%) are covered by water.

=== National protected areas ===
- Ashepoo-Combahee-Edisto (ACE) Basin National Estuarine Research Reserve (part)
- Ernest F. Hollings ACE Basin National Wildlife Refuge (part)
- Pinckney Island National Wildlife Refuge
- Reconstruction Era National Historical Park

=== State and local protected areas/sites ===
- Auldbrass Plantation
- Altamaha Towne Heritage Preserve
- Bay Point Shoal Seabird Sanctuary
- Charlesfort - Santa Elena Historic Site
- Coffin Point Plantation
- Coligny Beach Park
- Daws Island Heritage Preserve
- Fort Frederick Heritage Preserve
- Greens Shell Enclosure Heritage Preserve
- Hunting Island State Park
- Joiner Bank Seabird Sanctuary
- Old Island Heritage Preserve/Wildlife Management Area
- Old Sheldon Church Ruins
- Sea Pines Forest Preserve
- South Bluff Heritage Preserve
- Spanish Moss Trail
- Stoney Creek Battery Heritage Preserve
- Stony Creek Bridge
- Victoria Bluff Heritage Preserve/Wildlife Management Area
- Widgeon Point Preserve

=== Major water bodies ===
- Atlantic Ocean (North Atlantic Ocean)
- Colleton River
- Edisto River
- Harbor River
- Intracoastal Waterway
- May River
- Salkehatchie River

=== Adjacent counties ===
- Colleton County – north
- Jasper County – west
- Hampton County – northwest

=== Major highways ===
- US 17
- US 17 Alt.
- US 21
- US 21 Bus.
- US 278
- US 278 Bus.
- SC 46
- SC 116
- SC 128
- SC 170
- SC 802

=== Major infrastructure ===
- Hilton Head Island Airport
- Marine Corps Air Station Beaufort
- Marine Corps Recruit Depot Parris Island

== Demographics ==
Historical population
Census	Pop.	Note	%±
1790	18,753		—
1800	20,428		8.9%
1810	25,887		26.7%
1820	32,199		24.4%
1830	37,032		15.0%
1840	35,794		−3.3%
1850	38,805		8.4%
1860	40,053		3.2%
1870	34,359		−14.2%
1880	30,176		−12.2%
1890	34,119		13.1%
1900	35,495		4.0%
1910	30,355		−14.5%
1920	22,269		−26.6%
1930	21,815		−2.0%
1940	22,037		1.0%
1950	26,993		22.5%
1960	44,187		63.7%
1970	51,136		15.7%
1980	65,364		27.8%
1990	86,425		32.2%
2000	120,937		39.9%
2010	162,233		34.1%
2020	187,117		15.3%
2025 (est.)	204,433	▲	9.3%
U.S. Decennial Census; 1790–1960 1900–1990; 1990–2000 2010 2020

=== Racial and ethnic composition ===
Beaufort County, South Carolina – Racial and ethnic composition Note: the US Census treats Hispanic/Latino as an ethnic category. This table excludes Latinos from the racial categories and assigns them to a separate category. Hispanics/Latinos may be of any race.
Race / Ethnicity (NH = Non-Hispanic)	Pop 1980	Pop 1990	Pop 2000	Pop 2010	Pop 2020	% 1980	% 1990	% 2000	% 2010	% 2020
White alone (NH)	41,645	58,842	81,477	107,279	126,704	63.71%	68.08%	67.37%	66.13%	67.71%
Black or African American alone (NH)	21,191	24,415	28,654	30,662	27,545	32.42%	28.25%	23.69%	18.90%	14.72%
Native American or Alaska Native alone (NH)	129	233	288	338	354	0.20%	0.27%	0.24%	0.21%	0.19%
Asian alone (NH)	444	731	938	1,822	2,381	0.68%	0.85%	0.78%	1.12%	1.27%
Native Hawaiian or Pacific Islander alone (NH)	x	x	50	78	119	x	x	0.04%	0.05%	0.06%
Other race alone (NH)	66	36	84	217	675	0.10%	0.04%	0.07%	0.13%	0.36%
Mixed race or Multiracial (NH)	x	x	1,238	2,270	5,928	x	x	1.02%	1.40%	3.17%
Hispanic or Latino (any race)	1,889	2,168	8,208	19,567	23,411	2.89%	2.51%	6.79%	12.06%	12.51%
Total	65,364	86,425	120,937	162,233	187,117	100.00%	100.00%	100.00%	100.00%	100.00%

=== 2020 census ===
As of the 2020 census, 187,117 people, 76,373 households, and 50,500 families were residing in the county. The median age was 47.3 years; 18.9% of residents were under the age of 18 and 28.4% of residents were 65 years of age or older. For every 100 females there were 95.7 males, and for every 100 females age 18 and over there were 93.3 males age 18 and over.

Of the 76,373 households, 24.4% had children under the age of 18 living with them and 25.9% had a female householder with no spouse or partner present. About 25.5% of all households were made up of individuals and 13.7% had someone living alone who was 65 years of age or older.

The racial makeup of the county was 69.9% White, 14.9% Black or African American, 0.4% American Indian and Alaska Native, 1.3% Asian, 0.1% Native Hawaiian and Pacific Islander, 5.7% from some other race, and 7.6% from two or more races. Hispanic or Latino residents of any race comprised 12.5% of the population.

81.4% of residents lived in urban areas, while 18.6% lived in rural areas.

There were 98,068 housing units, of which 22.1% were vacant. Among occupied housing units, 74.7% were owner-occupied and 25.3% were renter-occupied. The homeowner vacancy rate was 2.0% and the rental vacancy rate was 13.3%.

=== 2010 census ===
At the 2010 census, 162,233 people, 64,945 households, and 45,322 families were living in the county. The population density was 281.5 inhabitants per square mile (108.7/km^{2}). There were 93,023 housing units at an average density of 161.4 units per square mile (62.3 units/km^{2}). The racial makeup of the county was 71.9% white, 19.3% black or African American, 1.2% Asian, 0.3% American Indian, 0.1% Pacific Islander, 5.2% from other races, and 2.1% from two or more races. Those of Hispanic or Latino origin made up 12.1% of the population. In terms of ancestry, 15.5% were German, 13.4% were Irish, 13.1% were English, 5.4% were Italian, and 5.0% were American.

Of the 64,945 households, 28.5% had children under 18 living with them, 55.4% were married couples living together, 10.7% had a female householder with no husband present, 30.2% were not families, and 24.3% of all households were made up of individuals. The average household size was 2.42 and the average family size was 2.84. The median age was 40.6 years.

The median income for a household in the county was $55,286 and for a family was $65,071. Males had a median income of $41,059 versus $33,959 for females. The per capita income for the county was $32,731. About 7.4% of families and 10.5% of the population were below the poverty line, including 16.3% of those under 18 and 5.8% of those 65 or over.

=== 2000 census ===
At the 2000 census, 120,937 people, 45,532 households, and 33,056 families lived in the county. The population density was 206 people per square mile (80 people/km^{2}). The 60,509 housing units had an average density of 103 units per square mile (40 units/km^{2}). The racial makeup of the county was 70.66% white, 23.98% black or African American, 0.27% Native American, 0.79% Asian, 0.05% Pacific Islander, 2.84% from other races, and 1.41% from two or more races. About 6.79% of the population were Hispanic or Latino of any race.

Of the 45,532 households, 30.4% had children under 18 living with them, 58.2% were married couples living together, 11.0% had a female householder with no husband present, and 27.4% were not families. Around 21.5% of all households were made up of individuals, and 8.3% had someone living alone who was 65 or older. The average household size was 2.51 and the average family size was 2.90.

In the county, the age distribution was 23.3% under 18, 12.0% from 18 to 24, 27.2% from 25 to 44, 22.1% from 45 to 64, and 15.5% who were 65 or older. The median age was 36 years. For every 100 females, there were 102.4 males. For every 100 females 18 and over, there were 102.0 males.

The median income for a household in the county was $46,992, and for a family was $52,704. Males had a median income of $30,541 versus $25,284 for females. The per capita income for the county was $25,377. About 8.00% of families and 10.70% of the population were below the poverty line, including 15.40% of those under age 18 and 6.70% of those age 65 or over.

== Law and government ==
Beaufort County is governed under the council-administrator form of government. Beaufort County Council is an elected body responsible for passing ordinances, setting county policies, and developing an annual budget for the administration of public services to citizens. The chairman is elected to a two-year term by council at the first meeting in January following a general election. The vice chairman is charged with carrying out the duties of the chairman in his or her absence. Council members serve four-year staggered terms. Each council member represents one of 11 districts within the county.

Beaufort County Council (as of 2024)
District	Council member
District 1	Gerald Dawson
District 2	David Bartholomew
District 3	York Glover
District 4	Alice Howard
District 5	Joe Passiment (chairman)
District 6	Anna Maria "Tab" Tabernik
District 7	Logan Cunningham
District 8	Paula Brown
District 9	Mark Lawson
District 10	Larry McElynn (vice chairman)
District 11	Thomas Reitz

=== Politics ===
United States presidential election results for Beaufort County, South Carolina
Year	Republican		Democratic		Third party(ies)	
Year	No.	%	No.	%	No.	%
1892	268	60.50%	175	39.50%	0	0.00%
1896	444	60.57%	289	39.43%	0	0.00%
1900	385	50.46%	378	49.54%	0	0.00%
1904	319	43.46%	415	56.54%	0	0.00%
1908	272	34.26%	522	65.74%	0	0.00%
1912	50	8.68%	464	80.56%	62	10.76%
1916	105	21.65%	376	77.53%	4	0.82%
1920	149	35.99%	265	64.01%	0	0.00%
1924	64	14.61%	365	83.33%	9	2.05%
1928	124	22.92%	414	76.52%	3	0.55%
1932	63	10.10%	555	88.94%	6	0.96%
1936	43	7.90%	501	92.10%	0	0.00%
1940	91	13.52%	582	86.48%	0	0.00%
1944	108	13.55%	594	74.53%	95	11.92%
1948	150	11.93%	253	20.13%	854	67.94%
1952	1,599	59.11%	1,106	40.89%	0	0.00%
1956	1,051	37.85%	710	25.57%	1,016	36.59%
1960	2,021	52.89%	1,800	47.11%	0	0.00%
1964	3,432	55.54%	2,747	44.46%	0	0.00%
1968	2,983	36.29%	3,740	45.49%	1,498	18.22%
1972	5,929	64.12%	3,237	35.01%	81	0.88%
1976	5,935	49.34%	6,049	50.29%	45	0.37%
1980	8,620	51.62%	7,415	44.40%	665	3.98%
1984	13,668	64.72%	7,347	34.79%	103	0.49%
1988	16,184	64.68%	8,691	34.73%	146	0.58%
1992	14,735	47.10%	11,466	36.65%	5,086	16.26%
1996	17,575	53.00%	13,532	40.81%	2,055	6.20%
2000	25,561	57.90%	17,487	39.61%	1,100	2.49%
2004	33,331	60.34%	21,505	38.93%	399	0.72%
2008	37,821	54.92%	30,396	44.14%	653	0.95%
2012	42,687	58.24%	29,848	40.72%	762	1.04%
2016	42,922	54.66%	32,138	40.93%	3,464	4.41%
2020	53,194	54.37%	43,419	44.38%	1,222	1.25%
2024	59,123	56.63%	44,002	42.15%	1,278	1.22%

Beaufort County leans Republican and has voted for that party's presidential nominee in every election since 1980. Even in the first half of the 20th century, Beaufort was routinely one of the counties in South Carolina that gave the Republicans the highest percentage of the vote. In 1920, for example, Republican nominee Warren G. Harding won only 4% of the total vote in South Carolina, but 36% in Beaufort County.

== Economy ==
In 2022, the gross domestic product (GDP) of Beaufort County was $10.8 billion (about $57,827 per capita). In chained 2017 dollars, the real GDP was $9.2 billion (around $48,930 per capita). From 2022 through 2024, the unemployment rate has fluctuated between 2.2 and 3.7%.

As of April 2024, some of the largest employers in the county included the Beaufort County School District, Food Lion, Kroger, Marriott, Publix, the United States Department of Defense, and Walmart.

Employment and Wage Statistics by Industry in Beaufort County, South Carolina
Industry	Employment Counts	Employment Percentage (%)	Average Annual Wage ($)
Accommodation and Food Services	14,136	19.6	30,940
Administrative and Support and Waste Management and Remediation Services	4,110	5.7	44,148
Agriculture, Forestry, Fishing and Hunting	300	0.4	65,052
Arts, Entertainment, and Recreation	3,153	4.4	33,956
Construction	4,545	6.3	63,440
Educational Services	4,511	6.3	46,748
Finance and Insurance	1,761	2.4	100,360
Health Care and Social Assistance	9,584	13.3	60,112
Information	448	0.6	71,916
Management of Companies and Enterprises	672	0.9	59,644
Manufacturing	1,041	1.4	64,532
Other Services (except Public Administration)	4,181	5.8	44,720
Professional, Scientific, and Technical Services	3,602	5.0	81,952
Public Administration	3,574	5.0	62,504
Real Estate and Rental and Leasing	2,444	3.4	54,860
Retail Trade	11,587	16.1	36,868
Transportation and Warehousing	1,188	1.6	53,768
Utilities	421	0.6	75,036
Wholesale Trade	767	1.1	81,016
Total	72,025	100.0%	49,446

== Education ==
=== Colleges and universities ===
- University of South Carolina Beaufort

=== Community, junior, and technical colleges ===
- Technical College of the Lowcountry

=== K-12 education ===
Most of the county is in Beaufort County School District for kindergarten to grade 12. The Beaufort Marine Corps Air Station has its own system at the elementary school level; the Department of Defense Education Activity has two schools covering elementary and middle school for the base. High-school students on the base go to the county school district.

District-operated public high schools

- Battery Creek High School
- Beaufort High School
- Beaufort Jasper Academy for Career Excellence
- Bluffton High School
- Hilton Head Island High School
- May River High School
- Whale Branch Early College High School

Charter schools

- Bridges Preparatory School

Private schools

- John Paul II Catholic School
- Hilton Head Christian Academy
- Beaufort Academy

== Communities ==
Beaufort County is included within the Hilton Head Island-Bluffton-Port Royal metropolitan statistical area, which had an estimated population of 232,523 in 2023.

=== Cities ===
- Beaufort (county seat)

=== Towns ===
- Bluffton
- Hilton Head Island (largest community)
- Port Royal
- Yemassee (partly in Hampton County)
- Hardeeville (mostly in Jasper County)

=== Census-designated places ===
- Burton
- Dale
- Daufuskie Island
- Fripp Island
- Harbor Island
- Laurel Bay
- Lobeco
- Seabrook
- Sheldon
- Shell Point

=== Unincorporated communities ===
- Brighton Beach
- Frogmore
- Lady's Island
- Parris Island
- Pocotaligo
- Pritchardville
- Sun City

=== Named islands ===
Some islands are also towns.

- Barataria Island
- Bull Island
- Callawassie Island
- Cane Island
- Coosaw Island
- Dataw Island
- Daufuskie Island
- Fripp Island
- Grays Hill
- Harbor Island
- Hilton Head Island
- Hunting Island
- Lady's Island
- Lemon Island
- Little Capers Island (uninhabited)
- Morgan Island
- Parris Island
- Poppy Hill
- Port Royal Island
- Pritchard Island (uninhabited research station)
- Saint Helena Island
- Spring Island
- St. Phillips Island
- Warsaw Island

== Notable people ==
- Pat Conroy, author
- Clarence Cummings, weightlifter
- Joe Frazier, boxer
- Candice Glover, American Idol season-12 winner
- Bob Inglis, politician
- Greg Jones, football player
- Thomas E. Miller, educator, lawyer, politician, son of Declaration signer Thomas E. Heyward, Jr.
- James Saxon, football player
- Duncan Sheik, musician
- Wayne Simmons, football player
- Robert Smalls, politician
- Stan Smith, tennis player
- Devin Taylor, football player
- D.J. Trahan, golfer
- Kathryn R. Wall, author

== See also ==
- List of counties in South Carolina
- National Register of Historic Places listings in Beaufort County, South Carolina
