= Burton, South Carolina =

- CDP
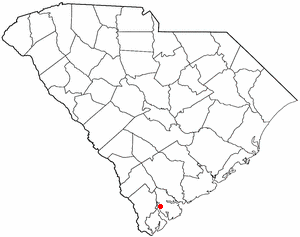
- Location of Burton, South Carolina
- Coordinates: 32°25′14″N 80°45′18″W
- Country: United States
- State: South Carolina
- County: Beaufort

Area
  - Total: 8.42 sq mi (21.80 km^{2})
  - Land: 8.35 sq mi (21.63 km^{2})
  - Water: 0.062 sq mi (0.16 km^{2})
- Elevation: 26 ft (7.9 m)

Population (2020)
  - Total: 6,777
  - Density: 811.4/sq mi (313.27/km^{2})
- Time zone: UTC-5 (Eastern (EST))
  - Summer (DST): UTC-4 (EDT)
- ZIP codes: 29902, 29906
- Area codes: 843, 854
- FIPS code: 45-10360
- GNIS feature ID: 2402736

Burton is a census-designated place (CDP) on Port Royal Island in Beaufort County, South Carolina, United States. The population was 6,976 at the 2010 census. As defined by the U.S. Census Bureau, Burton is included within the Hilton Head Island-Bluffton-Beaufort, SC Metropolitan Statistical Area.

== History ==
Burton's heyday was during the truck farming era in Beaufort County from 1900 to 1930. The "center" of Burton was where Broad River Boulevard crosses the abandoned Port Royal Railroad tracks and U.S. Route 21.

== Geography ==
According to the United States Census Bureau, the CDP has a total area of 8.6 square miles (22.2 km^{2}), of which 8.5 square miles (22.1 km^{2}) is land and 0.039 square miles (0.1 km^{2}), or 0.24%, is water.

== Demographics ==
Historical population
| Census | Pop. | Note | %± |
|---|---|---|---|
| 2020 | 6,777 | | — |
U.S. Decennial Census

=== 2020 census ===
Burton racial composition
| Race | Num. | Perc. |
|---|---|---|
| White (non-Hispanic) | 2,875 | 42.42% |
| Black or African American (non-Hispanic) | 2,422 | 35.74% |
| Native American | 19 | 0.28% |
| Asian | 112 | 1.65% |
| Pacific Islander | 6 | 0.09% |
| Other/Mixed | 325 | 4.8% |
| Hispanic or Latino | 1,018 | 15.02% |

As of the 2020 United States census, there were 6,777 people, 2,888 households, and 1,939 families residing in the CDP.

=== 2000 census ===
As of the census of 2000, there were 7,180 people, 2,511 households, and 1,898 families residing in the CDP. The population density was 650.7 inhabitants per square mile (251.2/km^{2}). There were 2,690 housing units at an average density of 243.8 per square mile (94.1/km^{2}). The racial makeup of the CDP was 47.80% White, 45.55% African American, 0.32% Native American, 1.32% Asian, 0.01% Pacific Islander, 2.53% from other races, and 2.47% from two or more races. Hispanic or Latino of any race were 6.02% of the population.

There were 2,511 households, out of which 42.5% had children under the age of 18 living with them, 51.8% were married couples living together, 18.0% had a female householder with no husband present, and 24.4% were non-families. 17.2% of all households were made up of individuals, and 3.7% had someone living alone who was 65 years of age or older. The average household size was 2.83 and the average family size was 3.17.

In the CDP, the population was spread out, with 30.4% under the age of 18, 13.8% from 18 to 24, 30.1% from 25 to 44, 18.8% from 45 to 64, and 6.9% who were 65 years of age or older. The median age was 29 years. For every 100 females, there were 98.2 males. For every 100 females age 18 and over, there were 95.4 males.

The median income for a household in the CDP was $39,753, and the median income for a family was $41,636. Males had a median income of $30,405 versus $20,716 for females. The per capita income for the CDP was $15,654. About 12.3% of families and 14.1% of the population were below the poverty line, including 18.2% of those under age 18 and 27.9% of those age 65 or over.
