= Special routes of U.S. Route 21 =

Special routes or bypasses in the U.S.

Special routes of U.S. Route 21

Highway system
- United States Numbered Highway System; List; Special; Divided

Several special routes of U.S. Route 21 (US 21) exist. In order from south to north, they are as follows.

== Beaufort business loop ==
U.S. Highway 21 Business
- Location: Beaufort, South Carolina
- Length: 5.400 mi (8.690 km)
- Existed: 1967–present

U.S. Highway 21 Business (US 21 Bus.) is a 5.400-mile (8.690 km) business route in Beaufort, South Carolina, that travels along Sea Island Parkway, Carteret Street, and Boundary Street.

== Yemassee alternate route ==
U.S. Highway 21 Alternate
- Location: Yemassee, South Carolina

== Rowesville alternate route ==
U.S. Highway 21 Alternate
- Location: Rowesville, South Carolina

== Orangeburg alternate route ==
U.S. Highway 21 Alternate
- Location: Orangeburg, South Carolina

== Orangeburg business loop 1 ==
U.S. Highway 21 Business
- Location: Orangeburg, South Carolina
- Length: 3.3 mi (5.3 km)
- Existed: 1950–1967

U.S. Highway 21 Business (US 21 Bus.) originally traversed Orangeburg, South Carolina, along Broughton Street (in concurrency with US 178 Bus.), Park Street, and Columbia Road. In 1967, the business loop was decommissioned after the establishment of the second business loop through Orangeburg; the old alignment continues as US 178 Bus. (Broughton Street) and US 21 Conn. (Park and Columbia streets).

== Orangeburg business loop 2 ==
U.S. Highway 21 Business
- Location: Orangeburg, South Carolina
- Length: 2.730 mi (4.394 km)
- Existed: 1967–present

U.S. Highway 21 Business (US 21 Bus.) is a 2.730-mile (4.394 km) business route of US 21 in Orangeburg, South Carolina. It begins at the intersection of US 21 and South Carolina Highway 4 (SC 4) and then traverses along parts of Charleston Highway and Magnolia Street, before ending at Chestnut Street (US 21).

== Orangeburg bypass route ==
U.S. Highway 21 Bypass
- Location: Orangeburg, South Carolina

== Orangeburg connector route ==
U.S. Highway 21 Connector
- Location: Orangeburg, South Carolina
- Length: 1.480 mi (2.382 km)

U.S. Highway 21 Connector (US 21 Conn.) is a 1.480-mile (2.382 km) connector route of US 21 in Orangeburg, South Carolina, that is unsigned. It travels from Broughton Street (US 178 Bus.) to Chestnut Street (US 21/US 178), via Park Street and Columbia Road.

== Orangeburg spur route ==
U.S. Highway 21 Spur
- Location: Orangeburg, South Carolina

== West Columbia connector route ==
U.S. Highway 21 Connector
- Location: West Columbia, South Carolina
- Length: 0.850 mi (1,368 m)

U.S. Highway 21 Connector (US 21 Conn.) is a 0.850-mile (1.368 km) connector route of US 21 that exists entirely within the city limits of West Columbia, South Carolina. It connects US 21/US 176/US 321, from where they curve off of Charleston Highway and onto Knox Abbott Drive, with US 1. It shares the Charleston Highway name with US 21/US 176/US 321 and is an unsigned highway.

Major intersections
The entire route is in West Columbia, Lexington County.

mi	km	Destinations	Notes
0.000	0.000	US 21 / US 176 / US 321 (Charleston Highway south / Knox Abbott Drive east)	Southern terminus; US 21 Conn. and US 21/US 176/US 321 share the Charleston Highway name.
0.420	0.676	SC 602 west (D Avenue) / 13th Street north – Lexington	Eastern terminus of SC 602; southern terminus of 13th Street.
0.630	1.014	12th Street (SC 35)	
0.850	1.368	US 1 north	No access from US 21 Conn. to US 1 south or from US 1 north to US 21 Conn.
1.000 mi = 1.609 km; 1.000 km = 0.621 mi: Incomplete access

== Columbia connector route ==
U.S. Highway 21 Connector
- Location: Columbia, South Carolina
- Length: 2.930 mi (4.715 km)

U.S. Highway 21 Connector (US 21 Conn.) is a 2.930-mile-long (4.715 km) connector route of US 21 that is an unsigned highway. It is located in the west-central part of Richland County and entirely within the city limits of Columbia in the U.S. state of South Carolina. It connects US 21/US 176/US 321 with US 76/US 378. It is concurrent with US 76 Conn. for its entire length.

It begins at an intersection with US 21/US 176/US 321 (Blossom Street/Huger Street). It travels to the east-northeast on Blossom Street. It crosses over some railroad tracks of CSX Transportation. It passes Greek Village, the fraternities and sororities of the University of South Carolina (USC). Right after passing Carolina Coliseum, it intersects SC 48 (Assembly Street). The highway passes the Carolina Community Garden at the Honors Residence Hall. Then, it passes the Thomas Cooper Library and then the Booker T. Washington Auditorium. It curves to the northeast and travels along the northwestern edge of Maxcy Gregg Park. This is southeast of the USC tennis courts at Blossom Street. The connector curves to the east and travels under a railroad bridge that carries railroad tracks of Norfolk Southern Railway. It curves to the southeast. At the intersection with Saluda Avenue, the highway turns left and travels to the northeast. One block later, at Devine Street, it turns right and travels to the east-northeast. At an intersection with Harden Street, it curves to the east-southeast and travels through a retail area before meeting its northern terminus, an intersection with US 76/US 378 (Millwood Avenue/Devine Street).

Major intersections
The entire route is in Columbia, Richland County.

mi	km	Destinations	Notes
0.000	0.000	US 21 / US 176 / US 321 (Blossom Street/Huger Street)	Southern terminus; south end of unsigned western segment of US 76 Conn. concurrency
0.580	0.933	SC 48 (Assembly Street)	
2.930	4.715	US 76 / US 378 (Millwood Avenue/Devine Street)	Northern terminus; north end of unsigned western segment of US 76 Conn. concurrency
1.000 mi = 1.609 km; 1.000 km = 0.621 mi: Concurrency terminus

== Columbia spur route ==
U.S. Highway 21 Spur
- Location: Columbia, South Carolina

== Ridgeway alternate route ==
U.S. Highway 21 Alternate
- Location: Ridgeway, South Carolina

== Ridgeway connector route ==
U.S. Highway 21 Connector
- Location: Ridgeway, South Carolina
- Length: 1.660 mi (2.672 km)

U.S. Highway 21 Connector (US 21 Conn.) is a connector route that partially travels through the western part of Ridgeway, South Carolina, which is in the southeastern part of Fairfield County. It is known as Coleman Highway and is an unsigned highway. It begins at an intersection with US 21 just southeast of Ridgeway. It travels to the northwest and enters the town. It then curves to the west-northwest before leaving the city limits. Then, it curves to the west before reaching its northern terminus, an intersection with SC 34.

== Fort Mill business loop ==
U.S. Highway 21 Business
- Location: Fort Mill, South Carolina
- Length: 7.060 mi (11.362 km)
- Existed: 1948–present

U.S. Highway 21 Business (US 21 Bus.) traverses through downtown Fort Mill, South Carolina, via Spratt Street, White Street, Old Nation Road, and Springfield Parkway.

== Rock Hill alternate route ==
U.S. Highway 21 Alternate
- Location: Rock Hill, South Carolina

== Rock Hill business loop ==
U.S. Highway 21 Business
- Location: Rock Hill, South Carolina
- Length: 6.7 mi (10.8 km)
- Existed: 1950–2013

U.S. Highway 21 Business (US 21 Bus.) originally traversed along Main Street, Albright Road, Black Street, Oakland Avenue, and Cherry Road, through downtown Rock Hill, South Carolina. It was decommissioned at the request of Rock Hill to gain ownership and maintenance oversight from the state.

== Rock Hill–Fort Mill business route ==
U.S. Highway 21 Business
- Location: Rock Hill–Fort Mill, South Carolina

== Jonesville–Elkin business loop ==
U.S. Highway 21 Business
- Location: Jonesville–Elkin, North Carolina
- Length: 7.8 mi (12.6 km)
- Existed: 1966–present

U.S. Highway 21 Business (US 21 Bus.) traverses through downtown Jonesville and Elkin, North Carolina, via Main and Bridge streets. The route was established after the mainline was realigned east along a completed section of Interstate 77 (I-77).

== Sparta truck route ==
U.S. Highway 21 Truck
- Location: Sparta, North Carolina
- Length: 1.68 mi (2.70 km)
- Existed: 2020–present

U.S. Highway 21 Truck (US 21 Truck) is an alternate route for trucks to bypass the downtown central business district of Sparta, North Carolina, and allows truck traffic to travel on and off North Carolina Highway 18 (NC 18). The 1.68-mile (2.70 km) route follows along the Sparta Parkway, which bypasses west from mainline US 21, connecting with Grandview Drive and West Whitehead Street (NC 18).

== Bluefield bypass route ==
U.S. Route 21 Bypass
- Location: Bluefield, West Virginia

U.S. Route 21 Bypass (US 21 Byp.) originally traveled through downtown Bluefield, West Virginia, utilizing Bluefield and Princeton avenues, but, as US 21 no longer serves north of Wytheville, Virginia, there is not a US 21 bypass. Prior to the Interstate Highway System, US 21 ran from Ohio to Florida. Once I-77 was built, there was no longer a need for US 21, and it made its terminus Wytheville.

== Cuyahoga Heights–Cleveland temporary route ==
U.S. Route 21 Temporary
- Location: Cuyahoga Heights–Cleveland, Ohio

== See also ==
- List of special routes of the United States Numbered Highway System
