= Laurel Bay, South Carolina =

- CDP
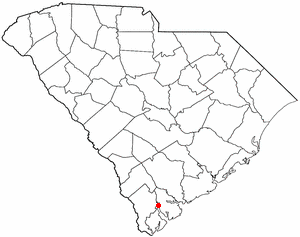
- Location of Laurel Bay, South Carolina
- Coordinates: 32°27′36″N 80°47′12″W
- Country: United States
- State: South Carolina
- County: Beaufort

Area
  - Total: 5.05 sq mi (13.09 km^{2})
  - Land: 4.17 sq mi (10.79 km^{2})
  - Water: 0.89 sq mi (2.30 km^{2})
- Elevation: 36 ft (11 m)

Population (2020)
  - Total: 5,082
  - Density: 1,220.4/sq mi (471.19/km^{2})
- Time zone: UTC-5 (Eastern (EST))
  - Summer (DST): UTC-4 (EDT)
- ZIP code: 29906
- Area codes: 843, 854
- FIPS code: 45-40525
- GNIS feature ID: 2403222

Laurel Bay is a census-designated place and military housing complex in Beaufort County, South Carolina, United States. The population was 5,891 at the 2010 census. As defined by the U.S. Census Bureau, Laurel Bay is included within the Hilton Head Island-Bluffton-Beaufort, SC Metropolitan Statistical Area.

The base primarily houses military personnel with families that are stationed at the nearby military bases: MCAS Beaufort, MCRD Parris Island, and USNH Beaufort. The housing area first opened in the mid-1950s.

== History ==
Chester Field, located within the housing area, was listed on the National Register of Historic Places in 1970.

In February 2015, two former Laurel Bay residents expressed health concerns that their children are sick from leukemia cancer by living in the area on YouTube. The housing, in the past, had used heating oil storage tanks for access to heating oil and after the oil was replaced, the tanks were capped and filled with dirt while underground. Starting in 2007, all of the tanks were removed but some heating oil was released. These former residents are worried that benzene vapor, a known carcinogen, from the leaked heating oil made their kids sick. The Marine Corps performed testing at most of the sites and the soil gas tests so far are "within acceptable limits" and SC DHEC data indicates that the 29906 zip code, which includes all of Laurel Bay Housing, does not show an increased rate of cancer.

== Geography ==
According to the United States Census Bureau, the census-designated place (CDP) has a total area of 5.4 square miles (14.0 km^{2}), of which 4.5 square miles (11.7 km^{2}) is land and 0.89 square miles (2.3 km^{2}), or 16.50%, is water.

== Demographics ==
Historical population
| Census | Pop. | Note | %± |
|---|---|---|---|
| 2020 | 5,082 | | — |
U.S. Decennial Census

As of the census of 2000, there were 6,625 people, 1,888 households, and 1,712 families residing in the CDP. The population density was 1,409.4 inhabitants per square mile (544.2/km^{2}). There were 1,955 housing units at an average density of 415.9 per square mile (160.6/km^{2}). The racial makeup of the CDP was 66.05% White, 25.87% African American, 0.63% Native American, 1.45% Asian, 0.14% Pacific Islander, 3.83% from other races, and 2.02% from two or more races. Hispanic or Latino of any race were 7.89% of the population.

There were 1,888 households, out of which 72.3% had children under the age of 18 living with them, 79.7% were married couples living together, 8.2% had a female householder with no husband present, and 9.3% were non-families. 6.0% of all households were made up of individuals, and 0.6% had someone living alone who was 65 years of age or older. The average household size was 3.51 and the average family size was 3.63.

In the CDP, the population was spread out, with 42.8% under the age of 18, 11.4% from 18 to 24, 39.1% from 25 to 44, 5.5% from 45 to 64, and 1.2% who were 65 years of age or older. The median age was 23 years. For every 100 females, there were 101.2 males. For every 100 females age 18 and over, there were 100.2 males.

The median income for a household in the CDP was $40,777, and the median income for a family was $39,236. Males had a median income of $28,512 versus $21,452 for females. The per capita income for the CDP was $12,686. About 4.6% of families and 4.6% of the population were below the poverty line, including 4.8% of those under age 18 and none of those age 65 or over.
