= Shell Point, South Carolina =

- CDP
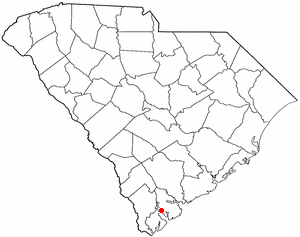
- Location of Shell Point, South Carolina
- Coordinates: 32°22′30″N 80°45′08″W
- Country: United States
- State: South Carolina
- County: Beaufort

Area
  - Total: 5.63 sq mi (14.58 km^{2})
  - Land: 4.01 sq mi (10.39 km^{2})
  - Water: 1.61 sq mi (4.18 km^{2})
- Elevation: 0 ft (0 m)

Population (2020)
  - Total: 2,281
  - Density: 568.4/sq mi (219.45/km^{2})
- Time zone: UTC-5 (Eastern (EST))
  - Summer (DST): UTC-4 (EDT)
- FIPS code: 45-65680
- GNIS feature ID: 2402847

Shell Point is a census-designated place (CDP) in Beaufort County, South Carolina, United States. The population was 2,336 at the 2010 census. Shell Point is served by the Burton Fire District. As defined by the U.S. Census Bureau, Shell Point is in the Hilton Head Island−Bluffton, SC Metropolitan Statistical Area.

== Geography ==
According to the United States Census Bureau, the CDP has a total area of 5.6 square miles (14.4 km^{2}), of which 3.9 square miles (10.2 km^{2}) is land and 1.6 square miles (4.2 km^{2}), or 29.17%, is water.

== Demographics ==
Historical population
Census	Pop.	Note	%±
2020	2,281		—
U.S. Decennial Census

As of the census of 2000, there were 2,856 people, 1,040 households, and 803 families residing in the CDP. The population density was 467.4 inhabitants per square mile (180.5/km^{2}). There were 1,103 housing units at an average density of 180.5 per square mile (69.7/km^{2}). The racial makeup of the CDP was 77.56% White, 16.14% African American, 0.49% Native American, 1.61% Asian, 0.07% Pacific Islander, 2.56% from other races, and 1.58% from two or more races. Hispanic or Latino of any race were 4.97% of the population.

There were 1,040 households, out of which 38.6% had children under the age of 18 living with them, 58.8% were married couples living together, 11.9% had a female householder with no husband present, and 22.7% were non-families. 17.9% of all households were made up of individuals, and 5.9% had someone living alone who was 65 years of age or older. The average household size was 2.74 and the average family size was 3.08.

In the CDP, the population was spread out, with 29.0% under the age of 18, 8.9% from 18 to 24, 31.4% from 25 to 44, 21.2% from 45 to 64, and 9.6% who were 65 years of age or older. The median age was 34 years. For every 100 females, there were 98.3 males. For every 100 females age 18 and over, there were 98.5 males.

The median income for a household in the CDP was $39,957, and the median income for a family was $50,284. Males had a median income of $25,920 versus $23,490 for females. The per capita income for the CDP was $17,222. About 6.5% of families and 9.7% of the population were below the poverty line, including 15.7% of those under age 18 and none of those age 65 or over.
