= Business route =

Special route connecting a major highway to a business district

Example of business route and other kinds of special routes

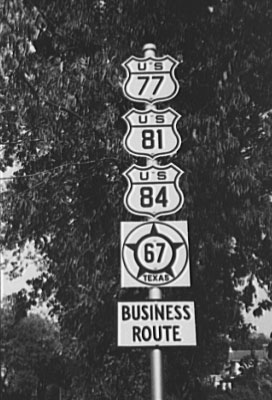
1939 photograph of a business route in Waco, Texas, United States

A business route (or business loop, business spur, or city route) in the United States is a short special route that branches off a parent numbered highway at its beginning, continues through the central business district of a nearby city or town, and finally reconnects with the same parent numbered highway at the business route's end. Their designation is often intended to direct traffic to the business districts bypassed when a new highway is constructed some distance away.

== Naming ==
Business routes share the same number as the major (parent) routes they parallel. For example, U.S. Route 1 Business (US 1 Bus.) splits from and parallels US 1, and Interstate 40 Business (I-40 Bus.) splits from and parallels I-40.

Typically, all business routes off the same parent route have the same name on signage. For example, St. Augustine business loop and Fredericksburg business loop are two of the many business routes stemming off US 1, all of which are marked as "US 1 Bus.". But within a state's transportation administration, different business routes may be assigned unique names to differentiate them. For example, Texas has 11 different business routes attached to I-35; while all are signed as "Business Loop Interstate 35", (BL I-35) they are designated by the Texas Department of Transportation as BL I-35-A, BL I-35-B, and so on.

Business routes are typically marked with the word "BUSINESS" above the major route's number or route shield. Alternatively, some states designate business routes by adding the letter "B" after the parent route's number. For example, Arkansas business routes of US 71 are marked as "US 71B". On some route shields and road signs, the word "business" is shortened to just "BUS", though abbreviation is usually avoided to prevent confusion with bus routes.

== Marking ==
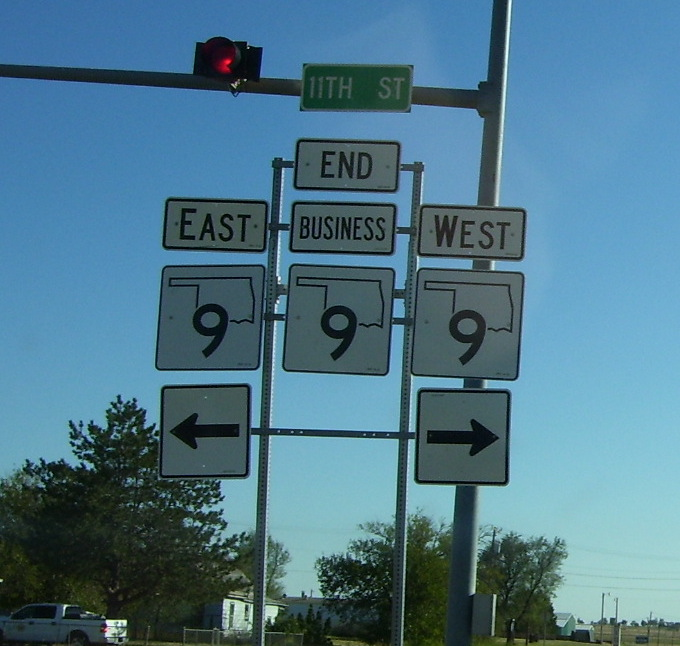
Business SH-9 in Hobart, Oklahoma ends at its parent route. The center SH-9 shield is topped with a "BUSINESS" plate, which is how business routes are typically marked.

Business route signage varies depending on the type of major route the business route branches off. Business routes paralleling U.S. and state highways usually have exactly the same marker shapes and nearly the same overall appearance as the routes they parallel, with a rectangular plate reading "BUSINESS" placed above the shield (either supplementing or replacing the directional plate, depending on the preference of the road agency). To better identify and differentiate alternate routes from the parent routes they parallel, some states, such as Maryland, opt to use green shields for business routes off U.S. Highways. In addition, Maryland uses a green shield for business routes off state highways, replacing the state name, "MARYLAND", with the word "BUSINESS".

Interstate Highway business routes use the same four-pointed shield design as regular Interstate Highways, but substitute the normal red and blue layout with an all-green color scheme. Also, the word "BUSINESS" appears within the shield, at its top above the highway number, instead of "INTERSTATE", and either "LOOP" or "SPUR" may appear below the word "BUSINESS" and above the Interstate number.

On maps, business routes are typically denoted by a standard marker containing the route number and the abbreviation "BUS" (e.g., "BUS 81" inside a U.S. Route shield to denote Bus. US 81). For Interstate business routes, an indication of whether the route is a business loop or business spur may also be included (e.g., adding "LOOP 44" inside the Interstate marker). The Michigan Department of Transportation's official state maps denote Interstate business routes with green shields that look similar to Interstate business route signage.

Example signage in the United States

Interstate Business loop

U.S. Highway business route marker used in Arkansas

U.S. Highway business route marker used in Maryland

State business route marker used in Maryland

State business route marker used in Georgia

Standard sign assembly, shown for Bus. M-60 in Michigan

== Maintenance ==
Business routes are maintained by different levels of government in different states. Some incorporate business routes into their state-maintained highway systems; others, such as Indiana and Wisconsin, entrust business route maintenance to local governments.

== Formation ==
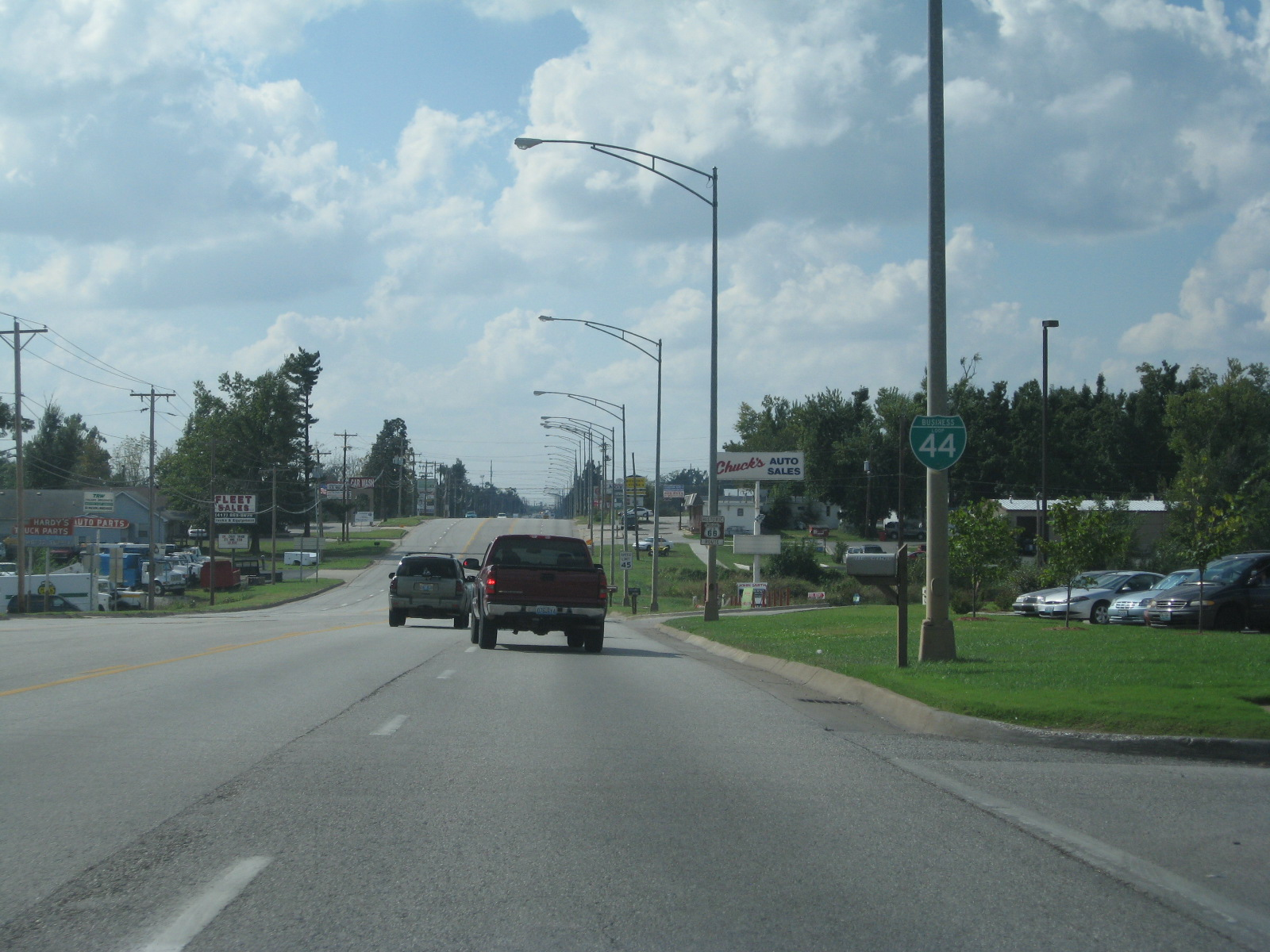
BL I-44 in Springfield, Missouri, was once part of US 66. Its status is shown by the green business Interstate marker attached to the lamppost.

Business routes typically predate their parent highways. They follow the original numbered route through a city or town. Their designation as business routes is largely the product of the era of large-scale highway construction in the United States from the 1930s through the 1970s. Typically, new highway designations carried traffic directly through the center of a given city or town. In later development, bypasses would be constructed around the central business districts they had once passed directly through. As these bypasses were built, the original sections of these routes that had once passed directly through a given city or town would often be designated as business routes.

These development patterns were the subject of frequent debate, particularly among business owners who feared the loss of customer traffic as highways took motorists away from downtown. For example, U.S. Route 66 was for many years the primary road connecting Chicago and Los Angeles. From the 1950s on, construction of the Interstate Highway System drew traffic away from Route 66, hurting the many businesses built on that traffic. Dozens of old sections of US 66 are now designated as business routes for I-15, I-40, I-44, and I-55.

While business routes frequently integrate into the street grid of their town or city, some maintain the higher-speed, limited-access design of their parent highways. These are sometimes called expressway business routes.

== City routes ==
City routes are most commonly found in the Midwestern United States, although there are a number of city routes in other parts of the U.S., as well. These routes serve the same purpose as business routes, but they feature "CITY" signs instead of "BUSINESS" signs above or below the route shields. The designations of many of these city routes are being phased out in favor of the business route designation.

Another definition of a "city route" is similar to a county route, where a particular city forms its own highway system, usually of beltways. The city of Pittsburgh, for instance, has a colored belt system. Officials in Charlotte, North Carolina, created Charlotte Route 4, a loop of surface streets around Uptown Charlotte. A route in Pawtucket, Rhode Island known as the Downtown Circulator was created by the city to help travelers navigate the downtown area.

== See also ==
- Alternate route
- Bypass
- Special route
- List of business routes of the Interstate Highway System
- List of special routes of the United States Numbered Highway System
