= South Carolina Highway 160 =

State highway in South Carolina, United States

South Carolina Highway 160

Route information
- Maintained by SCDOT
- Length: 11.040 mi (17.767 km)
- Existed: 1942–present

Major junctions
- West end: NC 160 at the North Carolina state line near Tega Cay
- I-77 in Fort Mill; US 21 in Fort Mill; US 21 Bus. in Fort Mill
- East end: US 521 in Indian Land

Location
- Country: United States
- State: South Carolina
- Counties: York, Lancaster

Highway system
- South Carolina State Highway System; Interstate; US; State; Scenic
← SC 157	→ SC 161

South Carolina Highway 160 (SC 160) is a 11.040-mile (17.767 km) primary state highway in the U.S. state of South Carolina. It travels from North Carolina state line, through Fort Mill, ending in Indian Land.

== Route description ==
SC 160 begins at the North Carolina state line near the Steele Creek area of Charlotte, North Carolina. Going southeast, it crosses Gold Hill Road northeast of Tega Cay. It continues bordering Tega Cay and Baxter Village before entering Fort Mill. The highway goes through the downtown area of Fort Mill, connecting briefly with U.S. Route 21 Business (US 21 Bus.). Continuing east, it ends at US 521 in Indian Land. The highway's width varies between two lanes and five lanes.

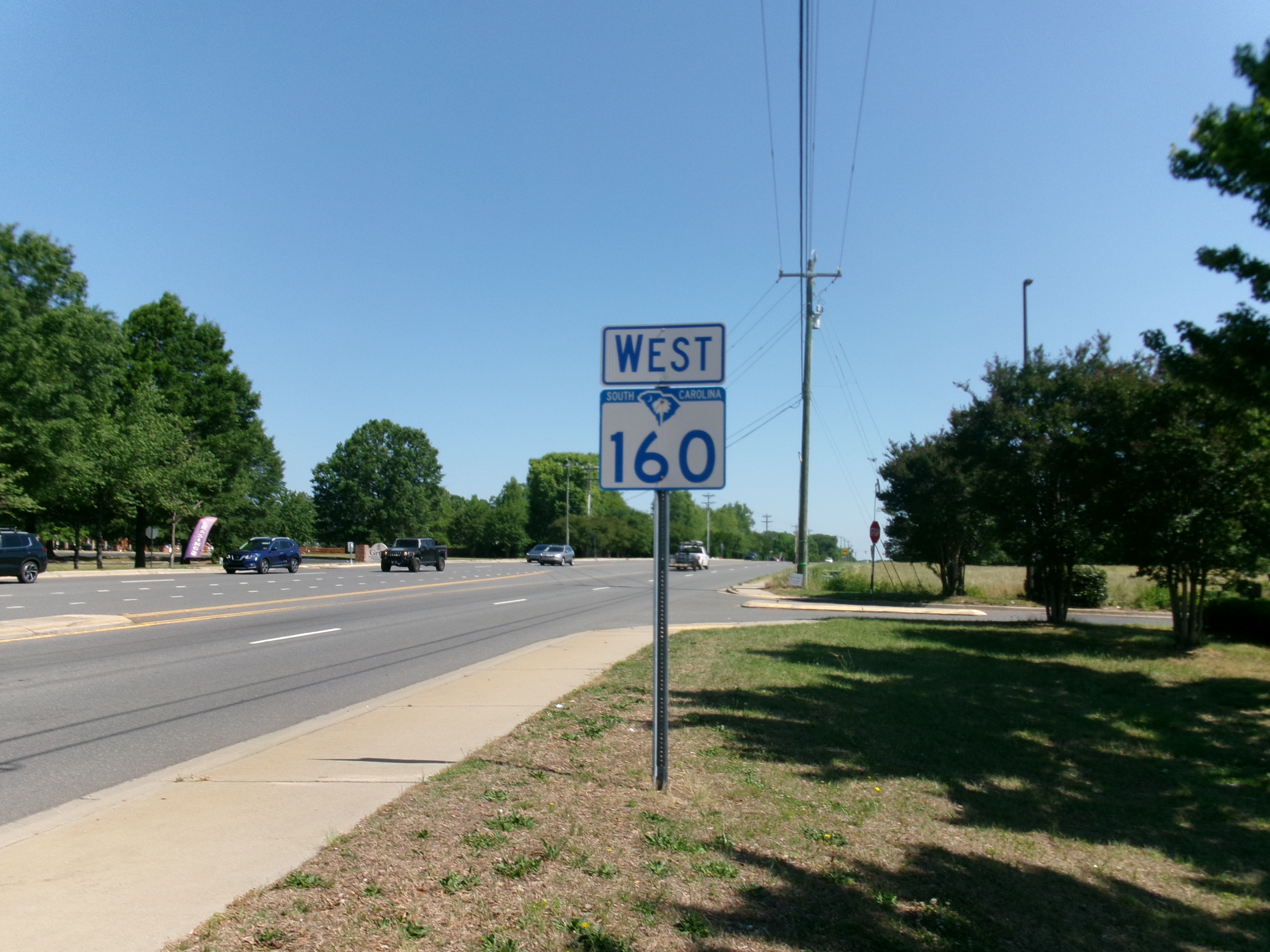
SC 160 westbound in Tega Cay near the North Carolina state line

=== Alternate names ===
The highway has other known names it uses locally in areas.

- Fort Mill Highway – road name of highway west of Fort Mill to Lancaster County, though sometimes used interchangeably for entire route.
- John D. Patterson Memorial Highway – official South Carolina honorary name of SC 160 in Lancaster County.

== History ==
The highway was established in 1942 as a renumbering of the second SC 211. The route has changed little since.

Old signs along highway use a north–south designation; newer signs designate the highway as east–west.

== Junction list ==
County	Location	mi	km	Destinations	Notes
York		0.000	0.000	NC 160 (Steele Creek Road) – Charlotte	North Carolina state line
York		0.960	1.545	SC 460 east (Gold Hill Road) – Tega Cay	Western terminus of SC 460
York	Fort Mill	3.910	6.293	I-77 – Columbia, Charlotte	I-77 exit 85
York	Fort Mill	4.630	7.451	US 21 / SC 160 Truck east	Western terminus of SC 160 Truck
York	Fort Mill	5.380	8.658	US 21 Bus. north (Old Nation Road / SC 160 Conn. east) – Pineville, Charlotte	Western end of US 21 Bus. concurrency; western terminus of SC 160 Conn., which is westbound only
York	Fort Mill	5.770	9.286	US 21 Bus. south (South White Street) – Rock Hill	Eastern end of US 21 Bus. concurrency
York	Fort Mill	7.380	11.877	SC 460 west (Springfield Parkway) / SC 160 Truck west	Eastern terminus of SC 460 and SC 160 Truck
Lancaster	Indian Land	11.040	17.767	US 521 (Charlotte Highway) – Rock Hill, Pineville, Charlotte	Eastern terminus
1.000 mi = 1.609 km; 1.000 km = 0.621 mi: Concurrency terminus

== Special routes ==
=== Fort Mill connector route ===
South Carolina Highway 160 Connector
- Location: Fort Mill, South Carolina
- Length: 0.060 mi (97 m)

South Carolina Highway 160 Connector (SC 160 Conn.) is a 2.7-mile-long (4.3 km) connector route of SC 160 in the north-central part of Fort Mill. It is actually the southernmost portion of the southbound lane of U.S. Route 21 Business (US 21 Bus.) at the point where it curves from a southwesterly direction to a west-southwesterly direction just north of that highway's concurrency with SC 160. The western terminus is opposite the Walter Elisha Park. There is no signage on this portion of the highway, either for the business route or the connector route. It is known as Old Nation Road and is an unsigned highway.

=== Fort Mill truck route ===
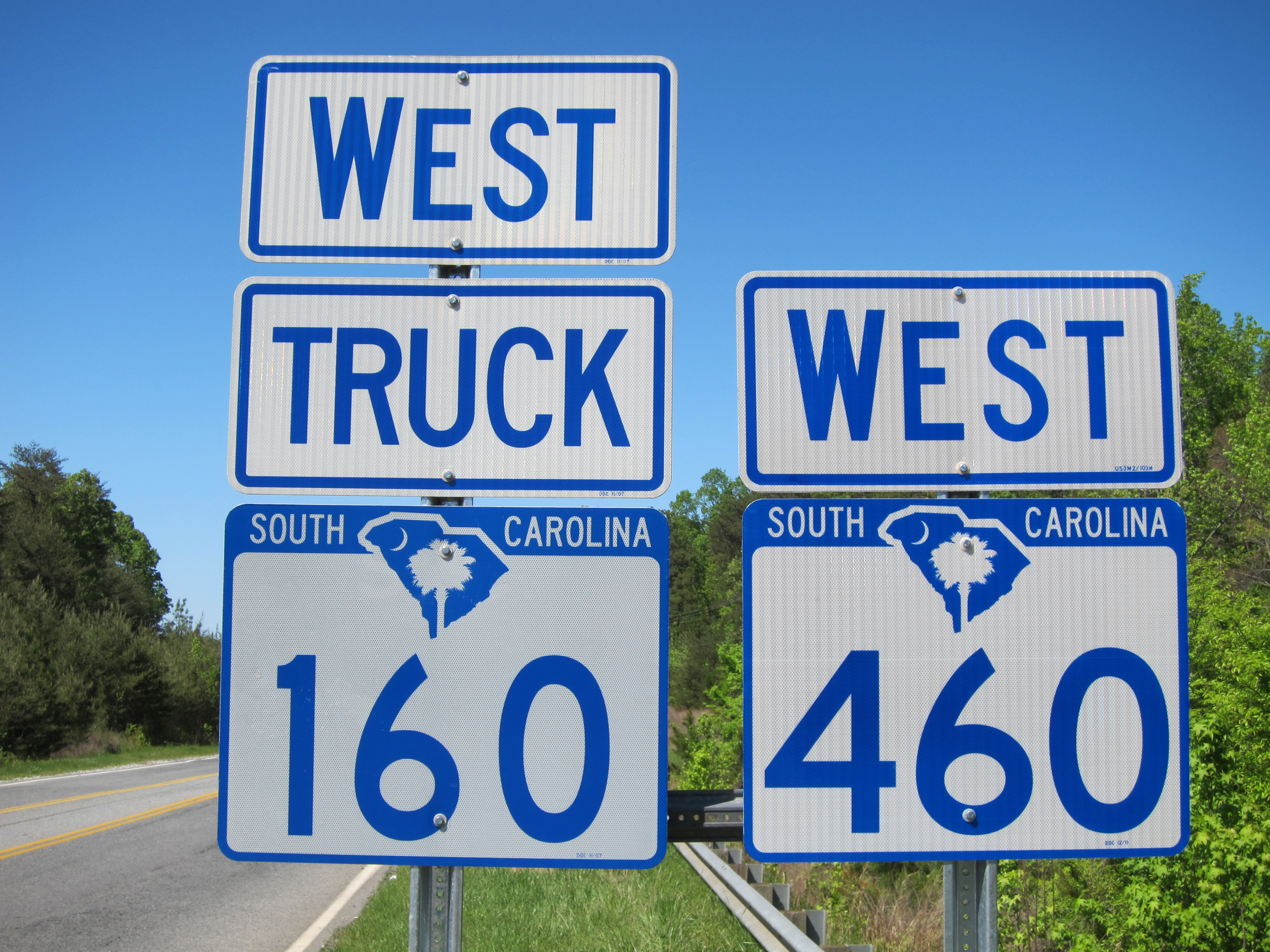
Truck SC 160 and SC 460 in Fort Mill

South Carolina Highway 160 Truck
- Location: Fort Mill, South Carolina
- Length: 6.990 mi (11.249 km)
- Existed: December 2007–present

South Carolina Highway 160 Truck (SC 160 Truck) is a 6.990-mile-long (11.249 km) truck route that bypasses downtown Fort Mill. Starting in the west, it follows U.S. Route 21 (US 21) north to SC 460 (Springfield Parkway), where it goes southeast back to SC 160.
