= South Carolina Highway 460 =

State highway in South Carolina, United States

South Carolina Highway 460

Route information
- Maintained by SCDOT
- Length: 7.5 mi (12.1 km)
- Existed: 2012–present

Major junctions
- West end: SC 160 in Tega Cay
- I-77 near Tega Cay; US 21 near Fort Mill
- East end: SC 160 in Fort Mill

Location
- Country: United States
- State: South Carolina
- Counties: York

Highway system
- South Carolina State Highway System; Interstate; US; State; Scenic
← SC 453	→ SC 461

South Carolina Highway 460 (SC 460) is a 7.5-mile (12.1 km) primary state highway in the U.S. state of South Carolina. It serves as a bypass of SC 160, from Tega Cay to east of Fort Mill.

== Route description ==
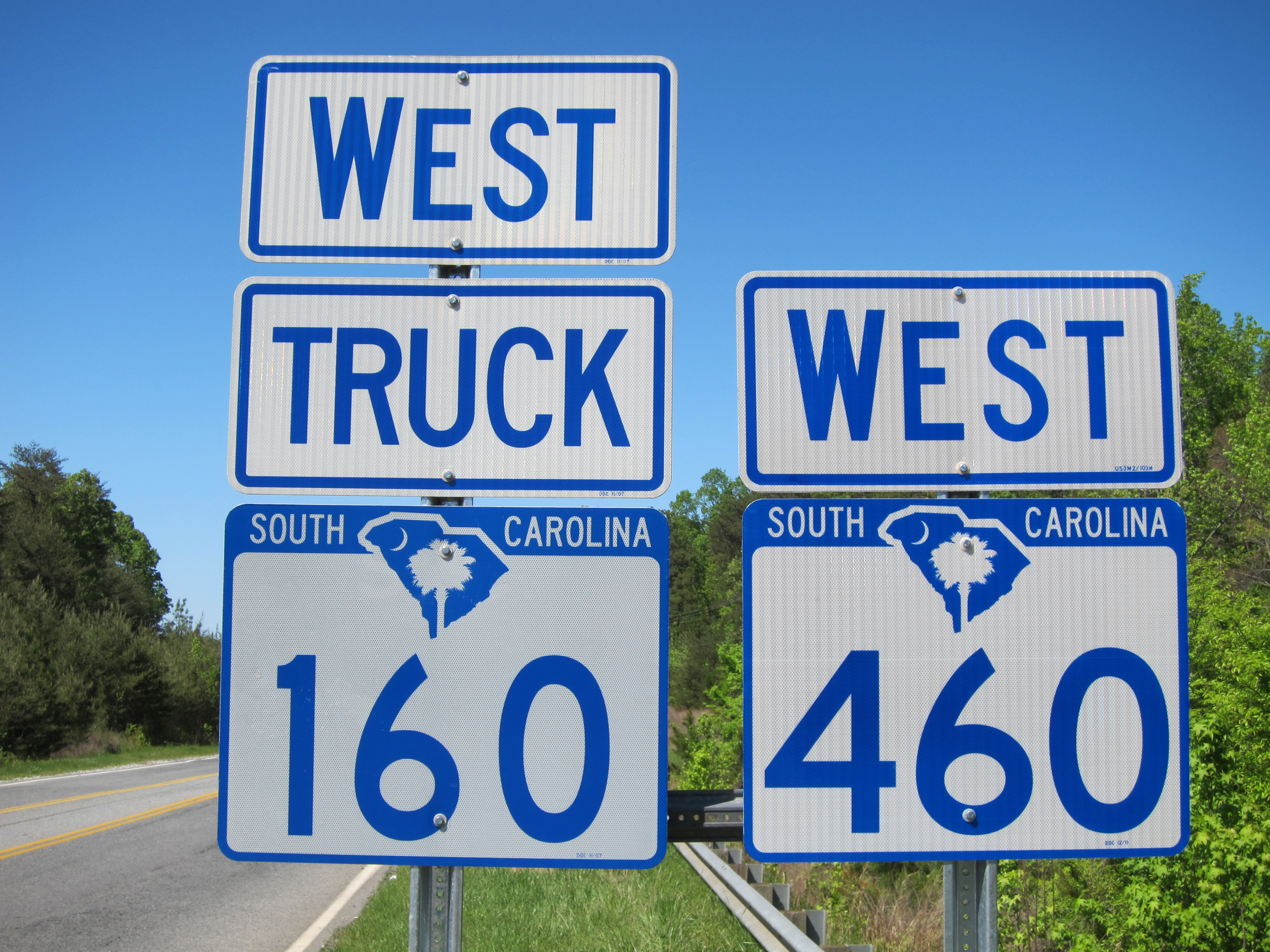
SC 160 Truck and SC 460 in Fort Mill

SC 460 begins at the intersection SC 160 and Gold Hill Road, in Tega Cay. Traveling east, along Gold Hill Road, it connects with Interstate 77 (I-77), then soon after splits from Gold Hill Road at Deerfield Drive intersection, continuing as Springfield Parkway. Connecting with U.S. Route 21 (US 21), it begins a concurrency with SC 160 Truck, followed by a quick concurrency with US 21 Business. Reaching back with SC 160, on the eastern side of Fort Mill, the highway ends with SC 160 Truck.

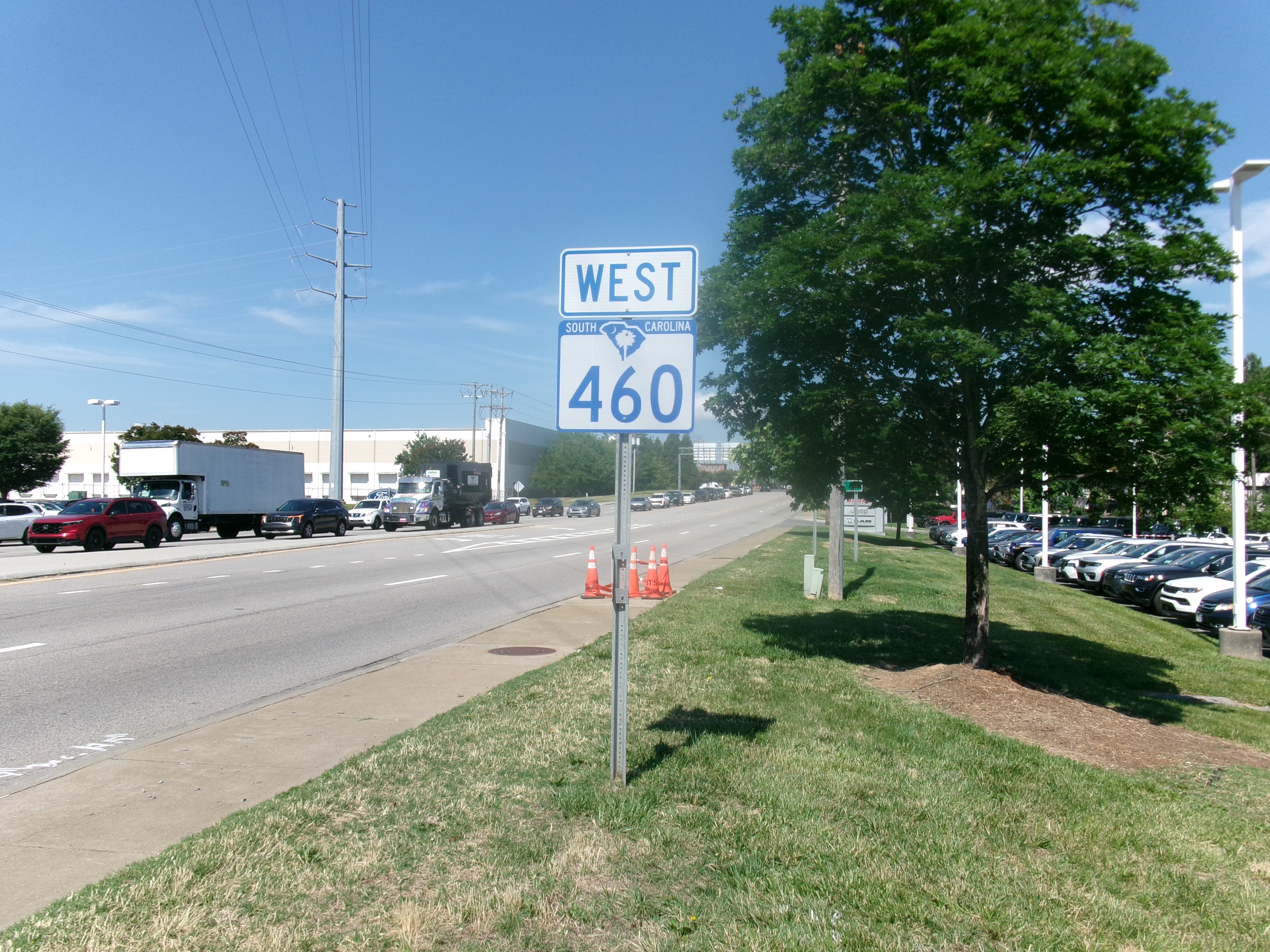
View west along SC 460 near the I-77 interchange

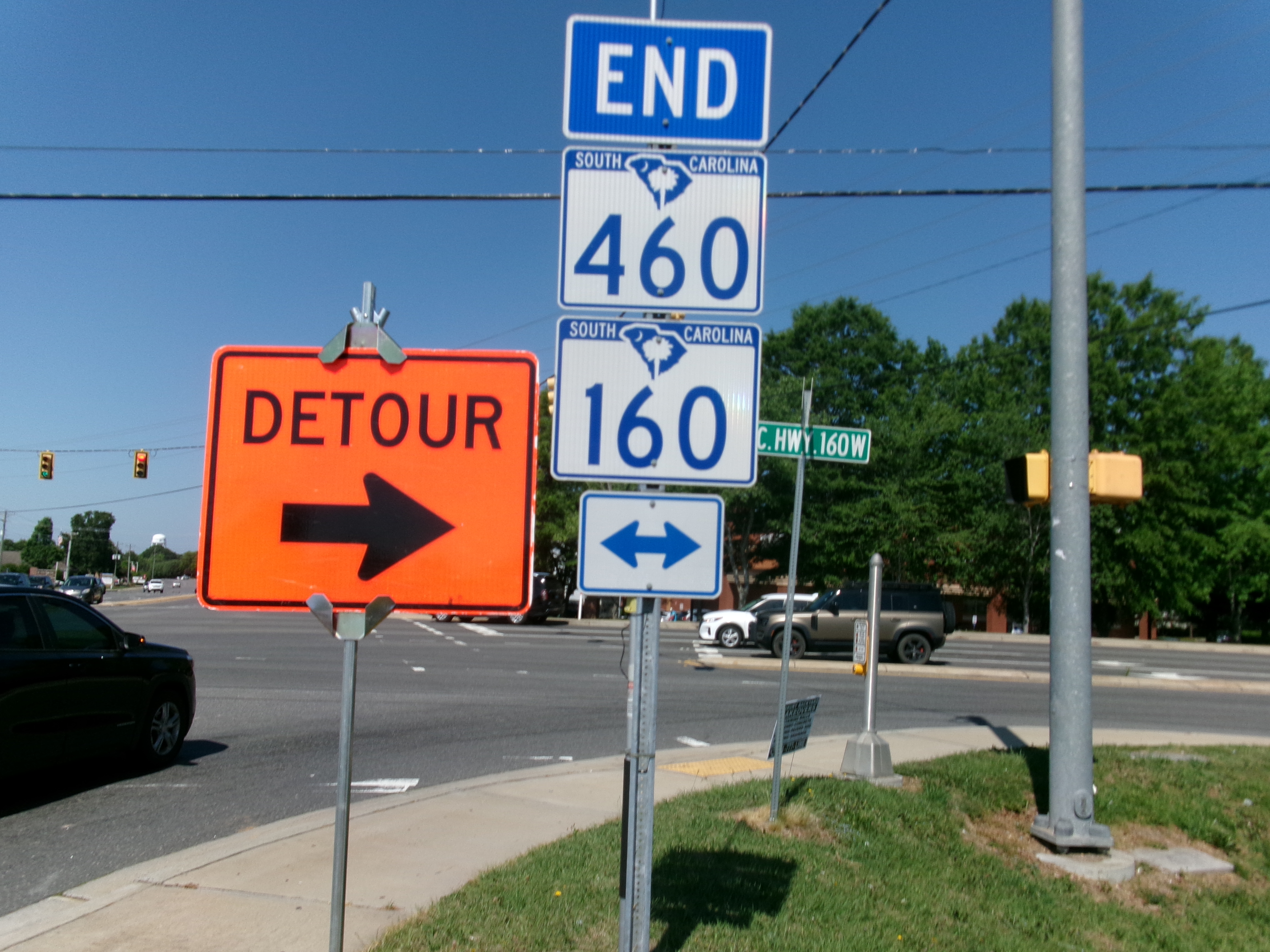
Western terminus of SC 460 at SC 160 in Tega Cay

The speed limit for most of SC 460 is 45 miles per hour (72 km/h), with 35 miles per hour (56 km/h) around the I-77 interchange. The Gold Hill Road segment is four-lane with turning median; it is also known as the Becky Meacham-Richardson Highway, after Becky Meacham-Richardson who served as a state representative for the Lake Wylie–Tega Cay area. The Springfield Parkway segment is two-lane with semi-controlled access.

== History ==
SC 460 appeared around 2012 as a new primary route, following existing Gold Hill Road and Springfield Parkway.

== Major intersections ==
The entire route is in York County.

Location	mi	km	Destinations	Notes
Tega Cay	0.000	0.000	SC 160 / Gold Hill Road	Western terminus; Gold Hill Road continues to the west.
	2.110	3.396	I-77 – Columbia, Charlotte	Diverging Diamond Interchange; I-77 exit 88
	3.300	5.311	US 21 (SC 160 Truck) – Fort Mill, Pineville	Western end of SC 160 Truck concurrency
	3.670	5.906	US 21 Bus. north (Old Nation Road)	Western end of US 21 Bus. concurrency
	4.280	6.888	US 21 Bus. south (Old Nation Road) / Carolina Orchards Boulevard	Eastern end of US 21 Bus. concurrency
Fort Mill	7.510	12.086	SC 160 (Tom Hall Street) / Fort Mill Southern Bypass	Eastern end of SC 160 Truck concurrency; eastern terminus
1.000 mi = 1.609 km; 1.000 km = 0.621 mi: Concurrency terminus
