= David Ikard =

African American and Diaspora Studies scholar

- Born: Troutman, North Carolina
- Education: North Carolina State University (BA, MA); University of Wisconsin–Madison (PhD)

David H. Ikard is professor of African-American and Diaspora studies at Vanderbilt University since 2017. Ikard was previously a professor of English and director of Africana studies at the University of Miami. He also taught at Florida State University and at the University of Tennessee–Knoxville.

Ikard earned a Bachelor of Arts and a Master of Arts from North Carolina State University in 1994 and in 1997 respectively. He also earned a PhD from the University of Wisconsin–Madison in 2002.

In March 2018, Ikard gave a talk at a TEDx in Nashville, Tennessee. During the talk, he debunked myths about civil rights activist Rosa Parks and explained why white people should care about the whitewashing of black history.

== Personal life ==
Ikard was born in Troutman, North Carolina and currently resides in Nashville.

== Bibliography ==
- Breaking The Silence: Toward a Black Male Feminist Criticism (2007)
- Nation of Cowards: Black Activism in Barack Obama's Post-Racial America (2012)
- Blinded by the Whites: Why Race Still Matters in 21st-Century America (2013)
- Lovable Racists, Magical Negroes, and White Messiahs (2017)
