= Interstate 77 in North Carolina =

Highway in North Carolina

Interstate 77
- I-77 highlighted in red

Route information
- Maintained by NCDOT
- Length: 105.7 mi (170.1 km)
- Existed: 1965–present
- NHS: Entire route

Major junctions
- South end: I-77 / US 21 at the South Carolina state line near Fort Mill, SC
- I-485 in Charlotte (twice); I-277 in Charlotte (twice); I-85 in Charlotte; I-40 in Statesville; I-74 near Mount Airy
- North end: I-77 at the Virginia state line near Mount Airy

Location
- Country: United States
- State: North Carolina
- Counties: Mecklenburg, Iredell, Yadkin, Surry

Highway system
- Interstate Highway System; Main; Auxiliary; Suffixed; Business; Future; North Carolina Highway System; Interstate; US; State; Scenic
← US 76	→ NC 78

Interstate 77 (I-77) is a part of the Interstate Highway System that runs 610.10 miles (981.86 km) from Cayce, South Carolina to Cleveland, Ohio. In the U.S. state of North Carolina, I-77 travels a total of 105.7 miles (170.1 km) from the South Carolina state line in the city of Charlotte to the Virginia state line north of Mount Airy. The major landscapes traversed by I-77 include the city of Charlotte and its urban core, the smaller suburban communities in the Piedmont region, and the rural foothills of Western North Carolina. The Interstate has one auxiliary route, I-277, a partial beltway around Uptown Charlotte.

The freeway bears several names in addition to the I-77 designation. Throughout the state, the freeway is known as the Blue Star Memorial Highway, a name shared with multiple Interstates across the state. Starting at the South Carolina state line, it is known as the General Paul R. Younts Expressway, switching at Woodlawn Road to the Bill Lee Freeway, ending at the Mecklenburg–Iredell county line. In Surry County, it is known as the Charles M. Shelton Highway. Not originally part of the Federal-Aid Highway Act of 1956, I-77 was added the following year as a route between Charlotte and Port Huron, Michigan, via Detroit, Michigan. In 1958, the routing was realigned toward Cleveland instead; the Detroit–Port Huron section became part of I-94. I-77 received two extension approvals; the first in 1964, continuing south from I-85 to US Route 74 (US 74), and the second in 1969 to the South Carolina state line toward Columbia. The Interstate was completed in 1977.

== Route description ==
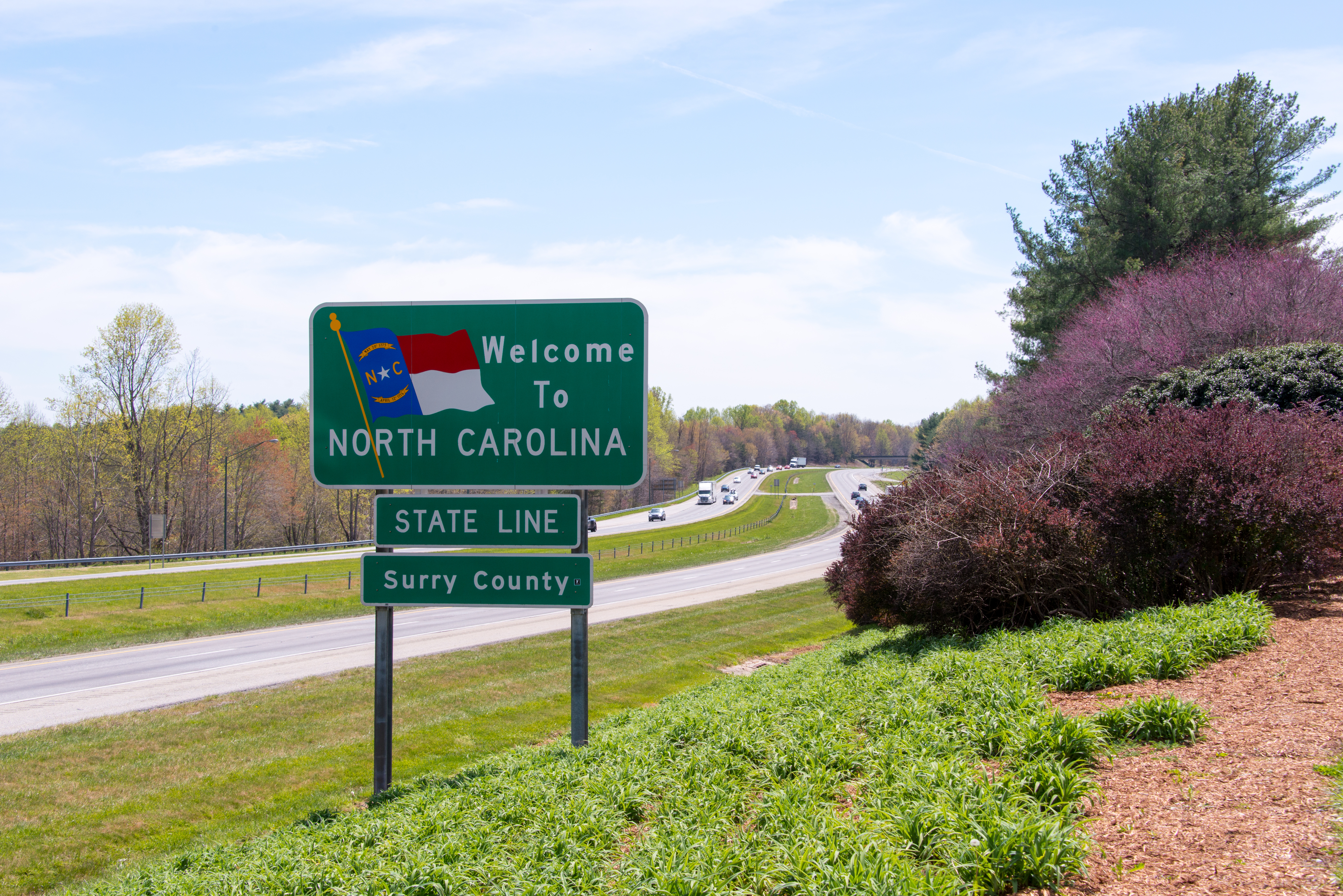
Virginia–North Carolina state line on I-77

I-77 begins at the South Carolina state line, near Fort Mill, in concurrency with US 21. I-77 goes through the city of Charlotte as a major north–south corridor, connecting Uptown Charlotte with the suburbs of Pineville, Huntersville, Cornelius, and Davidson. Shortly after entering North Carolina, it expands to six lanes. Between I-485 (exit 2) and I-277 (exit 9), the highway experiences massive traffic congestion during weekday rush hours (7:00–9:30 am/4:00–6:30 pm) due to commuter traffic. I-77 later encounters the other end of I-277 at exit 11, with the northbound carriageway briefly splitting from the southbound one and making an S-curve underneath I-277 due to the presence of left-hand exit ramps (southbound has a straight-through setup). Just north of Uptown Charlotte, I-77 makes a unique interchange configuration with I-85 (exit 13), with north and southbound lanes crisscrossing briefly. Between I-85 and I-485 (exit 19), I-77 featured the state's only high-occupancy vehicle (HOV) lanes, but, since 2019, they have been converted to express lanes that extend for 26 miles (42 km). After I-485, I-77 reduces to five lanes (three lanes northbound), then to four lanes after Gilead Road (exit 23).

At Lake Norman, I-77 crosses into Iredell County and becomes a more suburban Interstate, passing through Mooresville and then Statesville, where it intersects with I-40. It gradually becomes more rural outside of Statesville, becoming entirely rural after exiting Iredell County. For the rest of I-77's stretch through North Carolina, the only possible rest stop is the town of Elkin; the speed limit through this area is 70 mph (110 km/h). The final five miles (8.0 km) of I-77 is concurrent with I-74 to the Virginia state line (where I-74 ends), all within view of the Blue Ridge Mountains.

=== Express lanes ===
The I-77 Express lanes were financed, developed, and constructed and are operated by I-77 Mobility Partners, in a public–private partnership with the North Carolina Department of Transportation (NCDOT). The express lanes replaced the first and only HOV lanes in North Carolina, which existed from 2004 to 2015.

The 26-mile (42 km) high-occupancy toll (HOT) lanes are contained entirely within the median of I-77, with various connecting points to and from the general purpose lanes and direct access to northbound I-85 and southbound I-277/North Carolina Highway 16 (NC 16; Brookshire Freeway). The express lanes begin with four lanes (two lanes for each direction) at Brookshire Freeway (exit 11), in Charlotte; reduce to two lanes (one lane for each direction) at Catawba Avenue (exit 28), in Cornelius; and end at NC 150 (exit 36), near Mooresville. The tentative maximum speed limit is 65 mph (105 km/h) with a minimum speed limit at 45 mph (72 km/h). There are two exits in the stretch that are exclusive to the express lanes: at Lakeview Road in Charlotte and at Hambright Road in Huntersville.

Only vehicles with two axles or motorcycles are allowed on the express lanes. Emergency vehicles when responding to emergencies and mass transit vehicles are exempt and are not tolled.

On June 1, 2019, the first portion of the I-77 Express lanes opened between Hambright Road in Huntersville and NC 150 in Mooresville. The remainder of the I-77 Express lanes south to I-277 in Charlotte were open in November 2019.

==== Tolls ====
The express lanes uses open road tolling, with tolls payable with a valid transponder (NC Quick Pass, E-ZPass, ExpressToll, K-TAG, Peach Pass, Pikepass, SunPass, or TollTag) or bill by mail, which uses automatic license plate recognition and charge a higher rate with additional fees. Toll rates are based on a dynamic pricing, which means toll prices will fluctuate periodically throughout the day based on real-time traffic conditions and demand to maintain an average travel speed of 48 mph (77 km/h); toll rate changes may occur as frequently as every five minutes, though drivers will only pay the rate displayed when entering the express lanes. When the express lanes first opened in September 2018, they used a fixed rate based on the segment and time of day for the first 180 days of operation, with a total one-way rate range within $0.30–$11.00 with valid transponder.

As of March 5, 2022, the total one-way northbound rate will range within $2.70–$70.45 and the total one-way southbound rate will range within $2.45–$58.00 with valid transponder.

==== HOV3+ ====
Vehicles with three passengers or more may use the express lanes for free, provided they have a E-ZPass Flex Transponder or notify via the HOV mobile app/website, with at least 15 minutes before traveling. Violators are subject to a fine of up to $100 plus court costs; as well as two points against their driver's license for each HOV infraction. Motorcycle drivers with a valid transponder may use the express lanes for free.

== History ==
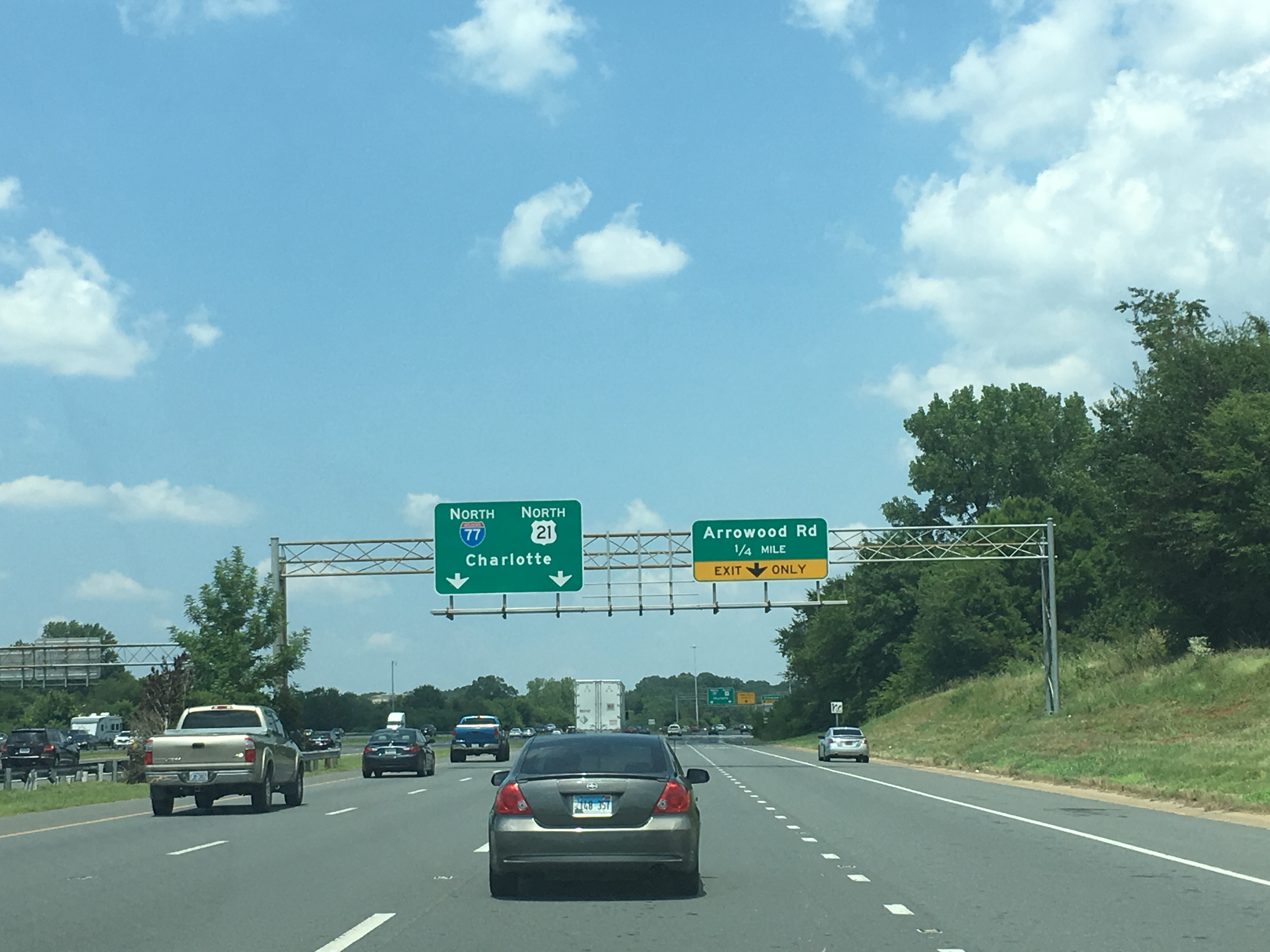
I-77/US 21 northbound approaching the Arrowood Road interchange in Charlotte

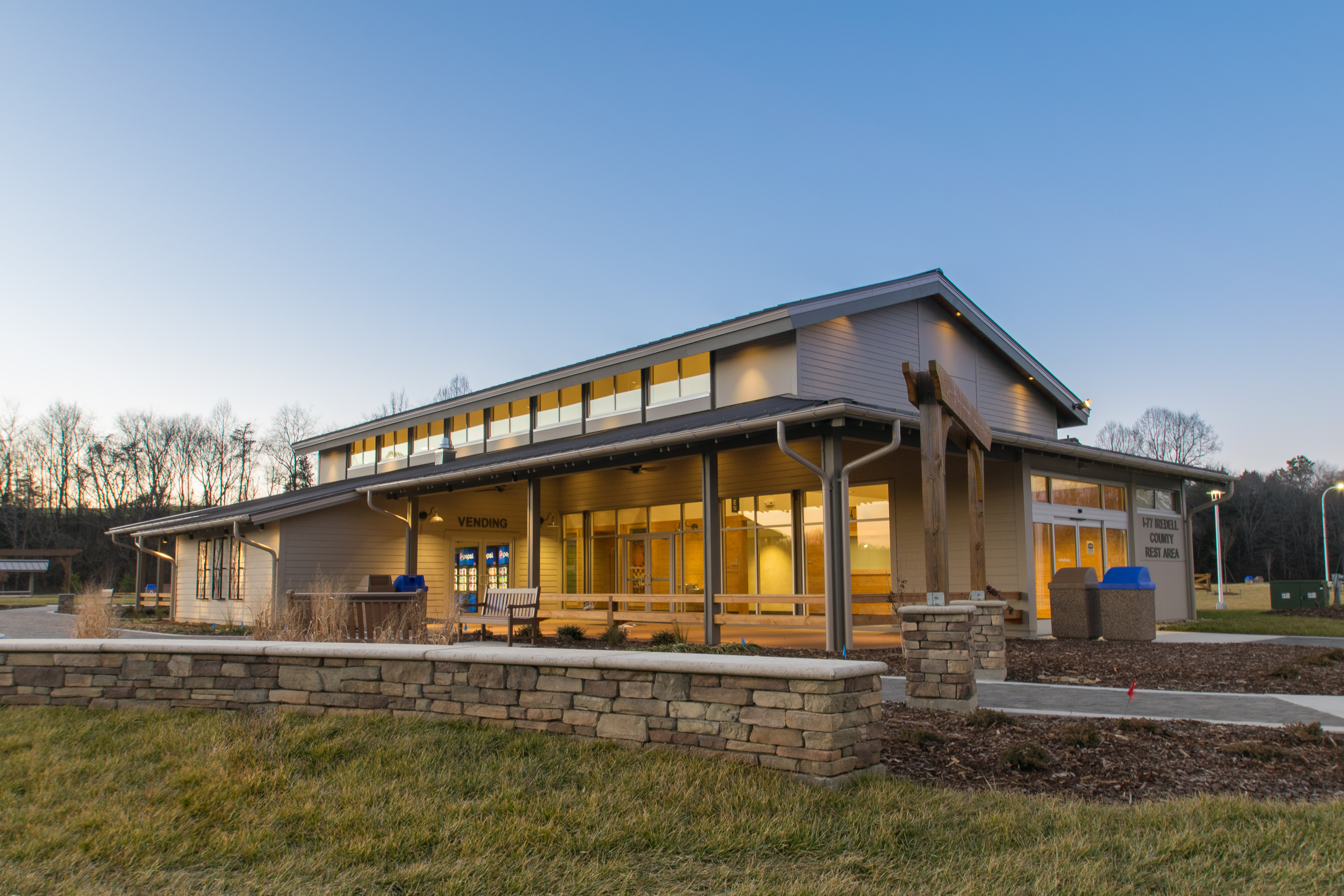
Iredell County Rest Area

I-77 was not part of the original plans for 714 miles (1,149 km) of the nation's Interstate Highway System in North Carolina when they were conveyed in 1956 by the then-North Carolina State Highway Commission. I-77 was added in 1957, increasing the state's mileage to 776 miles (1,249 km).

On August 4, 1959, the commission selected the routing of I-77 to run between I-85 in Charlotte and a point on the Virginia border in Elkin. That would change in late 1960 when the commission voted to route the highway just west of Mount Airy, saying the route would serve the most people.

With construction beginning in the 1960s, I-77 would gain additional mileage in October 1964 when a two-mile (3.2 km) extension was granted by the US Bureau of Public Roads. Instead of ending at I-85, I-77 now ended at Independence Boulevard (US 74) in Uptown Charlotte. Another extension was granted in the late 1960s that extended I-77 from Independence Boulevard to the South Carolina border. The latest extension also included a relocation of US 21 from the city's surface streets to the new Interstate.

I-77 opened to traffic in the following segments:

- 1965: Yadkin and Surry counties (US-21 Elkin Bypass only).
- 1966: A 23-mile (37 km) stretch in Iredell County.
- 1967: Stretches in Mecklenburg, Yadkin, and Iredell counties.
- 1968: A stretch of highway in the Davidson and Cornelius areas in Mecklenburg and Iredell counties.

By 1972, I-77 was open from exit 28 (NC 73) to exit 73 north of Elkin. The last two sections of the highway to open to traffic was the stretch from Cornelius to Charlotte in 1975 and from exit 73 to the Virginia state line in 1977.

In April 2001, I-74 was overlapped with I-77 from the Virginia state line to exit 101.

On December 17, 2004, I-77 was widened to six-lanes with HOV lanes, between I-85 to the proposed location of I-485 (later opened December 8, 2008).

On June 28, 2013, a new interchange was added in Mooresville: exit 35 (Brawley School Road). The interchange was built with additional shoulder space and lights that will not need to be moved when I-77 is eventually widened in area.

In 2015, NCDOT signed a contract with I-77 Mobility Partners to begin construction and eventual management of the toll lanes starting in 2018. However, new criticism erupted before the financial agreement was made when local politicians discovered the contract was amended in 2014 giving I-77 Mobility Partners a 50-year noncompete clause. The clause eliminated any future widening of additional free-lanes between Uptown Charlotte and Mooresville, or, if any additional free-lanes were added, then NCDOT would have to pay the developer compensation. The toll lanes between Mooresville and Huntersville opened June 1, 2019, and the last sections leading into Uptown Charlotte opened November 23 of that year.

On February 1, 2018, NCDOT opened a new rest area located in the median of I-77, at milemarker 58. Construction of the 5,000-square-foot (460 m^{2}) $15-million (equivalent to $19.3 million in 2024) facility started in early 2015. With the opening of the facility, four older rest areas in Iredell and Yadkin counties, built in 1972–1973, were closed.

On November 22, 2022, a news helicopter crashed near I-77 at Nations Ford Road in South Charlotte, killing pilot Chip Tayag and meteorologist Jason Myers, who were employees of local TV station WBTV.

The I-40/I-77 interchange (exit 51) underwent major upgrade in three phases: reconstruction of nearby intersections on both Interstates, reconstruction and widening of I-40/I-77 interchange, and construction of new ramps at the interchange. The estimated cost for the entire project, including widening of a total of seven and half miles of both highways to eight lanes, is $260 million, and construction began in March 2012. The new partial turbine interchange replaced the cloverleaf interchange which was built in the late 1960s. All lanes opened December 22, 2023, but cold weather delayed further resurfacing and pavement markings until Spring 2024.

== Future ==
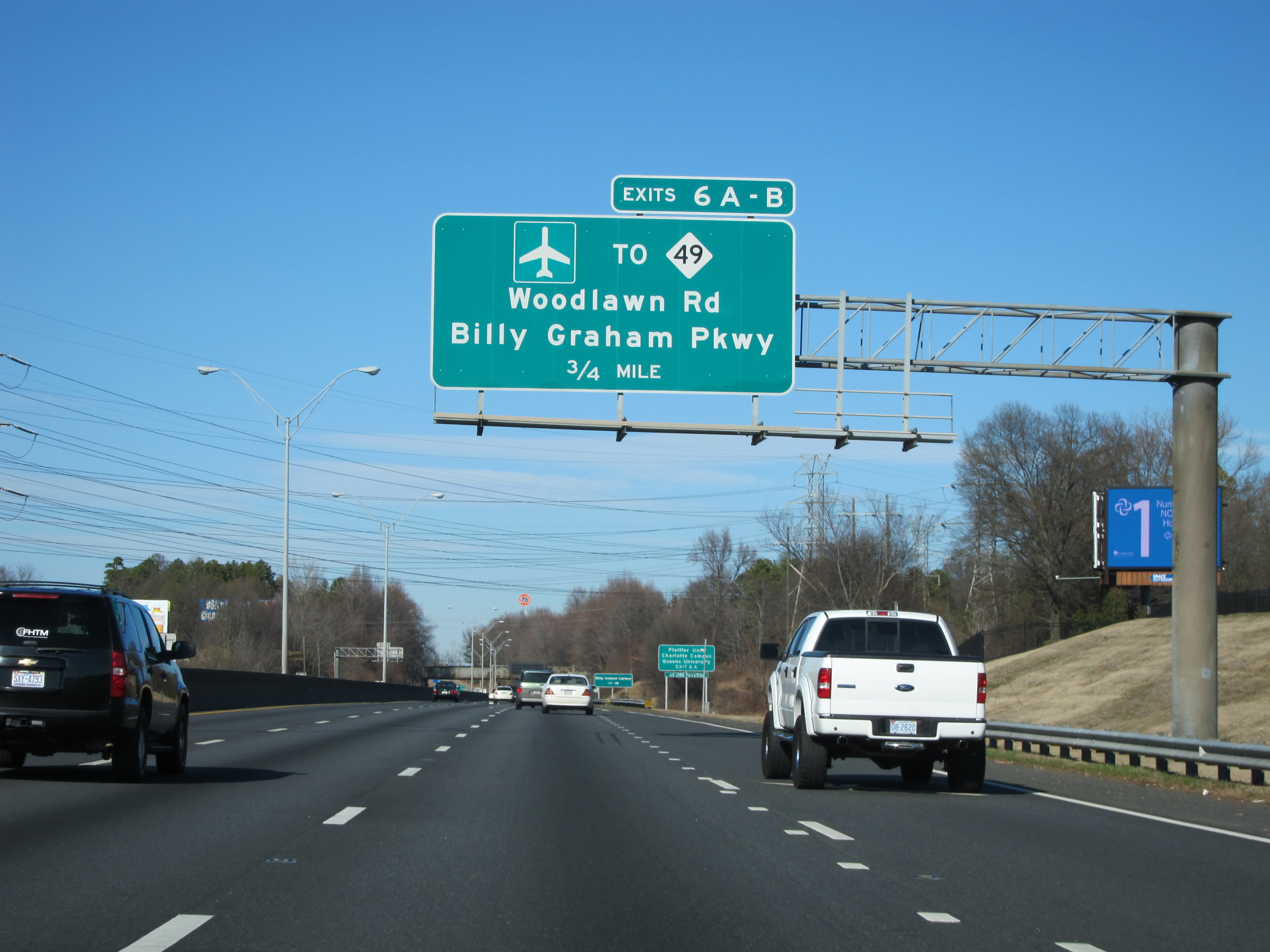
Woodlawn Road/Billy Graham Parkway overhead sign

I-77 is planned to have its existing southbound travel lanes widened (not add more lanes), between I-277/NC 16 (Brookshire Freeway) to I-85 in Charlotte. Estimated to cost $16.5 million, the purpose of the project is to widen the lanes back to proper Interstate standards as agreed with the Federal Highway Administration (FHWA), when NCDOT were given design exceptions when adding the HOV lanes in 2004. Construction began in late 2016.

As of June 2016, HOT lanes are being constructed along I-77. The project is broken into two parts: the first is constructing new travel lanes from I-485 interchange (exit 19) to West Catawba Avenue (exit 28), at an estimated cost of $57 million, and the second would be to convert the existing HOV lanes from Brookshire Boulevard (exit 11) to I-485 (exit 19). After completion, drivers and motorcyclists can still use the lane for free if qualified under HOV rules; noncompliant drivers will be charged a toll. In July 2019, NCDOT and the Charlotte Regional Transportation Planning Organization announced a project that would convert segments of I-77 shoulders to travel lanes to be used only during peak periods between I-485 and Mooresville.

Another set of HOT lanes is being studied along I-77 from south of Uptown Charlotte to the South Carolina border. A funding agreement in 2024 let both private and public dollars be used to build the project. Strong opposition from neighborhoods already affected by the highway led to a May 2026 city council vote to oppose continuing the funding agreement. On May 20, 2026, the region's transportation board voted to stop the project, and two days later, the state decided the project would not go forward. However, on September 21, 2026, there was another council vote to revive the project, and several communities who originally opposed it in May changed their votes, thus making a 7-4 margin in favor of continuing and allowing the city to avoid having to repay $70 million that had been spent on the project from 2018 until its earlier cancellation.

== Auxiliary route ==
I-277 is the only auxiliary route in the state. The auxiliary route loops around uptown Charlotte.

== Exit list ==
County	Location	mi	km	Exit	Destinations	Notes
Mecklenburg	Charlotte	0.00	0.00		I-77 south / US 21 south – Rock Hill, Columbia	Continuation into South Carolina
Mecklenburg	Charlotte	0.9	1.4	1A	Westinghouse Boulevard	
Mecklenburg	Charlotte	1.8	2.9	1B	I-485 – Huntersville, Pineville	Formerly exit 2 (southbound) before August 2010; I-485 exit 67
Mecklenburg	Charlotte	2.8	4.5	3	Arrowood Road	Formerly exit 2 (northbound) before August 2010
Mecklenburg	Charlotte	3.7	6.0	4	Nations Ford Road	
Mecklenburg	Charlotte	4.8	7.7	5	Tyvola Road	Single-point urban interchange
Mecklenburg	Charlotte	6.0	9.7	6A	Woodlawn Road south (Charlotte Route 4 east) – Queens University	To Pfeiffer University
Mecklenburg	Charlotte	6.2	10.0	6B	To NC 49 (S. Tryon Street) / Billy Graham Parkway (Charlotte Route 4 west)	To Billy Graham Library and Charlotte Douglas International Airport; southbound signed as NC 49 south (S. Tryon St. south) only
Mecklenburg	Charlotte	7.3	11.7	7	To NC 49 / Clanton Road	
Mecklenburg	Charlotte	8.3	13.4	8	To NC 160 / Remount Road	Northbound exit and southbound entrance
Mecklenburg	Charlotte	9.0	14.5	9A	NC 160 (West Boulevard)	Southbound exit and northbound entrance; access from collector-distributor lanes
Mecklenburg	Charlotte	9.4	15.1	9B	I-277 north / US 74 east / NC 27 east (John Belk Freeway)	Access from collector-distributor lanes; I-277 exits 1B-C
Mecklenburg	Charlotte	9.5	15.3	9C	US 74 west (Wilkinson Boulevard) / NC 27 west to US 29	US 29 and NC 27 signed northbound only; access from collector-distributor lanes; US 74 exits 1B-C
Mecklenburg	Charlotte	9.9	15.9	10A	US 29 (Morehead Street) to NC 27	Southbound exit and northbound entrance; former route of NC 27
Mecklenburg	Charlotte	10.4	16.7	10	Trade Street / Fifth Street	Signed southbound as exits 10B (Trade Street east) and 10C (Fifth Street/Trade Street west)
Mecklenburg	Charlotte	11.0	17.7	11A	I-277 south / NC 16 south (Brookshire Freeway east) – Downtown Charlotte	I-277 exits 5A-B
Mecklenburg	Charlotte	11.2	18.0	11B	NC 16 north (Brookshire Freeway west)	Left exit northbound; NC 16 exits 5A-B
Mecklenburg	Charlotte			—	I-77 north (Express lanes)	Southern terminus of HOV3+/toll lanes
Mecklenburg	Charlotte			—	I-277 south	Express lanes only; southbound exit and northbound entrance
Mecklenburg	Charlotte	12.4	20.0	12	Lasalle Street / Atando Avenue	
Mecklenburg	Charlotte	13.3	21.4	13	I-85 – Greensboro, Spartanburg	Signed as exits 13A (north) and 13B (south); hybrid interchange; I-85 exit 38
Mecklenburg	Charlotte			—	I-85 north	Express lanes only; northbound exit and southbound entrance
Mecklenburg	Charlotte	15.8	25.4	16	US 21 north (Sunset Road) to NC 115	North end of US 21 overlap; signed as exits 16A (north/east) and 16B (west); To Historic Latta Plantation/Carolina Raptor Center; parclo
Mecklenburg	Charlotte			—	Lakeview Road	Express lanes only
Mecklenburg	Charlotte	18.6	29.9	18	NC 24 (W.T. Harris Boulevard)	To Northlake Mall; parclo
Mecklenburg	Huntersville	19.7	31.7	19A	I-485 north (Inner) to I-85 north – Matthews	I-485 exits 23A-B; I-85 not signed northbound
Mecklenburg	Huntersville	19.7	31.7	19B	I-485 south (Outer) to I-85 south – Pineville	I-485 exits 23A-B; I-85 not signed northbound
Mecklenburg	Huntersville			—	Hambright Road	Express lanes only
Mecklenburg	Huntersville	23.0	37.0	23	Gilead Road – Huntersville	
Mecklenburg	Huntersville	25.5	41.0	25	NC 73 – Concord, Huntersville	
Mecklenburg	Cornelius			27	Westmoreland Road	Future interchange (unfunded)
Mecklenburg	Cornelius	28.3	45.5	28	US 21 south (Catawba Avenue) – Cornelius, Lake Norman	South end of US 21 overlap, converted into a diverging diamond interchange in August 2013
Mecklenburg	Davidson	29.8	48.0	30	Griffith Street – Davidson	To Davidson College
Lake Norman				Lake Norman Causeway		
Iredell	Mooresville	31.7	51.0	31	Langtree Road – Mooresville	
Iredell	Mooresville	33.3	53.6	33	US 21 north – Lake Norman	North end of US 21 overlap
Iredell	Mooresville	35.0	56.3	35	Brawley School Road	Single-point urban interchange
Iredell	Mooresville	36.2	58.3	36	NC 150 – Lincolnton, Mooresville	Planned diverging diamond interchange
Iredell	Mooresville			—	I-77 south (Express Lanes)	Northern terminus of HOV3+/toll lanes
Iredell				38	Cornelius Road	Future interchange (funded)
Iredell		41.8	67.3	42	US 21 / NC 115 – Troutman	Half-clover interchange
Iredell		45.5	73.2	45	Amity Hill Road – Troutman, Barium Springs	
Iredell	Statesville	48.7	78.4	49A	US 70 (Garner Bagnal Boulevard)	Half-clover interchange
Iredell	Statesville	49.0	78.9	49B	Statesville, Downtown	Half-clover interchange
Iredell	Statesville	50.1	80.6	50	E. Broad Street – Downtown	
Iredell	Statesville	51.3	82.6	51	I-40 – Winston-Salem, Asheville	Signed as exits 51A (east) and 51B (west) southbound; I-40 exit 152
Iredell		54.0	86.9	54	US 21 – Turnersburg	
Iredell		59.0	95.0	59	Tomlin Mill Road – Olin	
Iredell		65.5	105.4	65	NC 901 – Harmony, Union Grove	
Yadkin		73.7	118.6	73	US 421 – Yadkinville, Winston-Salem, Wilkesboro, Boone	Signed as exits 73A (south) and 73B (north); cloverleaf interchange; US 421 exit 265; to North Wilkesboro Speedway & Appalachian State University
Yadkin		79.0	127.1	79	US 21 south / US 21 Bus. north – Jonesville	South end of US 21 overlap
Yadkin	Jonesville	81.9	131.8	82	NC 67 – Jonesville, Boonville, Elkin	
Yadkin River				Sgt. Gregory Keith Martin Memorial Bridges		
Surry	Elkin	83.7	134.7	83	US 21 north – Sparta, Roaring Gap	North end of US 21 overlap; southbound access is via exit 85; to Blue Ridge Parkway
Surry	Elkin	84.8	136.5	85	NC 268 Byp. to US 21 north – Elkin	
Surry	Salem Fork	93.2	150.0	93	Zephyr Road – Dobson	
Surry	Oak Grove	100.0	160.9	100	NC 89 – Mount Airy, Galax	
Surry	Pine Ridge	100.8	162.2	101	I-74 east – Mount Airy, Winston-Salem	East end of I-74 overlap; semi-directional T interchange; I-74 exit 5
Surry		105.7	170.1		I-77 north (Future I-74) – Wytheville	Continuation into Virginia
1.000 mi = 1.609 km; 1.000 km = 0.621 mi: Concurrency terminus; HOV only; Incomplete access; Unopened

== See also ==
- Carowinds
- Interstate 74
- Lake Norman
- Lake Norman State Park
- Northlake Mall
- Uptown Charlotte

Interstate 77
Previous state: South Carolina	North Carolina	Next state: Virginia
