= North Carolina Highway 160 =

State highway in Mecklenburg County, North Carolina, US

North Carolina Highway 160

Route information
- Maintained by NCDOT
- Length: 14.9 mi (24.0 km)
- Existed: 1942–present

Major junctions
- South end: SC 160 at the South Carolina state line near Tega Cay, SC
- I-485 in Charlotte; I-77 / US 21 in Charlotte
- North end: NC 49 in Charlotte

Location
- Country: United States
- State: North Carolina
- Counties: Mecklenburg

Highway system
- North Carolina Highway System; Interstate; US; State; Scenic
← NC 159	→ NC 161

North Carolina Highway 160 (NC 160) is a primary state highway in the U.S. state of North Carolina. The highway runs north–south, connecting the Steele Creek neighborhood of Charlotte, Charlotte Douglas International Airport, and Uptown Charlotte.

== Route description ==
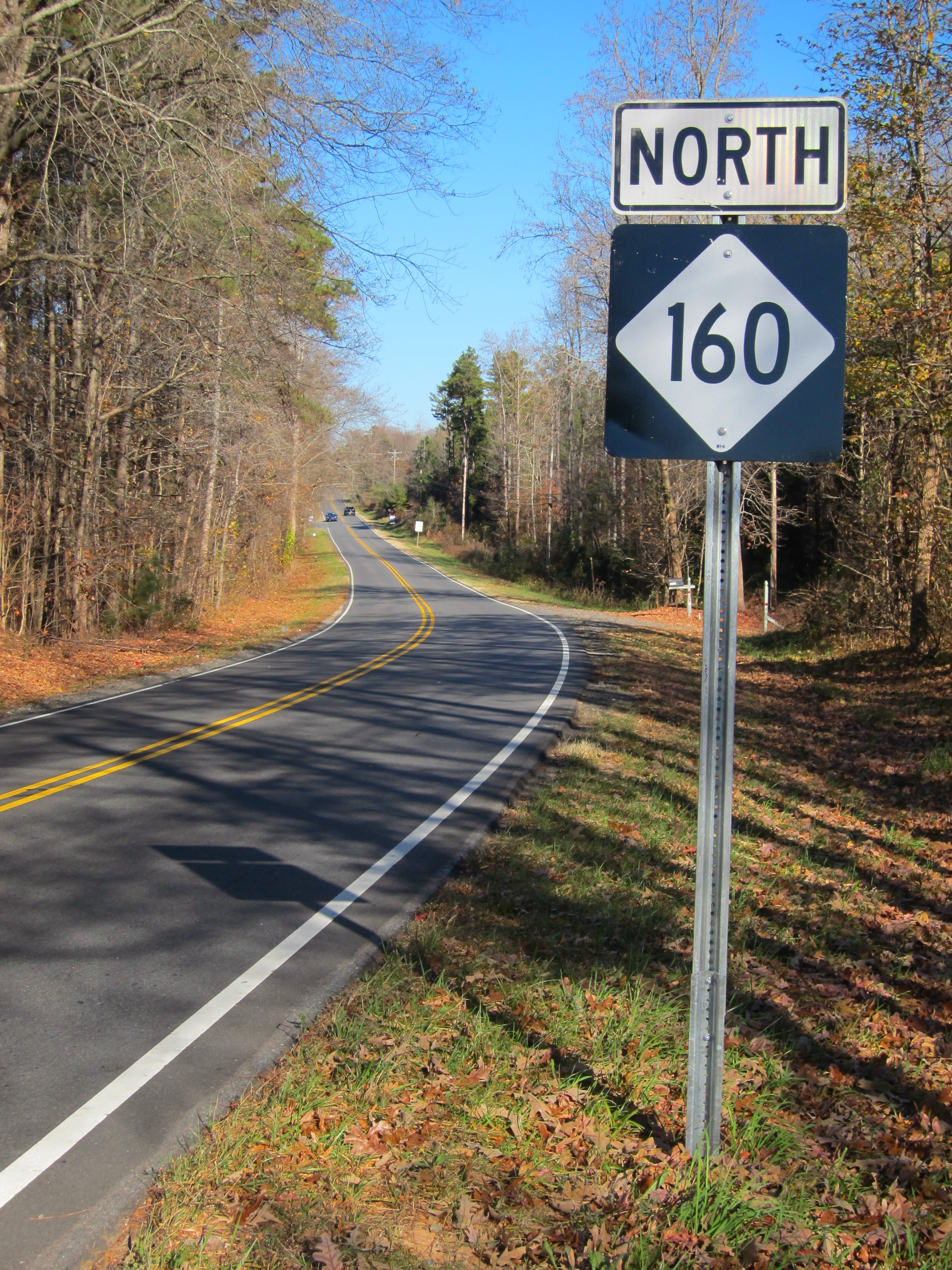
First sign for NC 160 north in Steele Creek.

NC 160 begins at the South Carolina border, where South Carolina Highway 160 (SC 160) ends near Tega Cay, South Carolina. From the state line, the route heads northwards, crossing South Tryon Street (NC 49) for the first time about two miles (3.2 km) inside North Carolina.

NC 160 winds its next five to six miles (8.0–9.7 km) going through southwest Charlotte's Steele Creek community and industrial district. The main intersection with NC 160 in this area, is at Westinghouse Boulevard; at this point, the route bears the street name Steele Creek Road.

Continuing north, NC 160 crosses over Seddon Rusty Goode Freeway (Interstate 485 (I-485), exit 4). One mile (1.6 km) after crossing I-485, NC 160 crosses into Charlotte's city limits again and enters the city's airport area, where Charlotte Douglas International Airport is located. After entering the area, NC 160 darts east-by-northeast onto West Boulevard, leaving Steele Creek Road (which briefly continues as Dixie Road) to head to the greater airport. NC 160 is the only way to access the Airport Police, the North Carolina Air National Guard station and the Charlotte Aviation Museum.

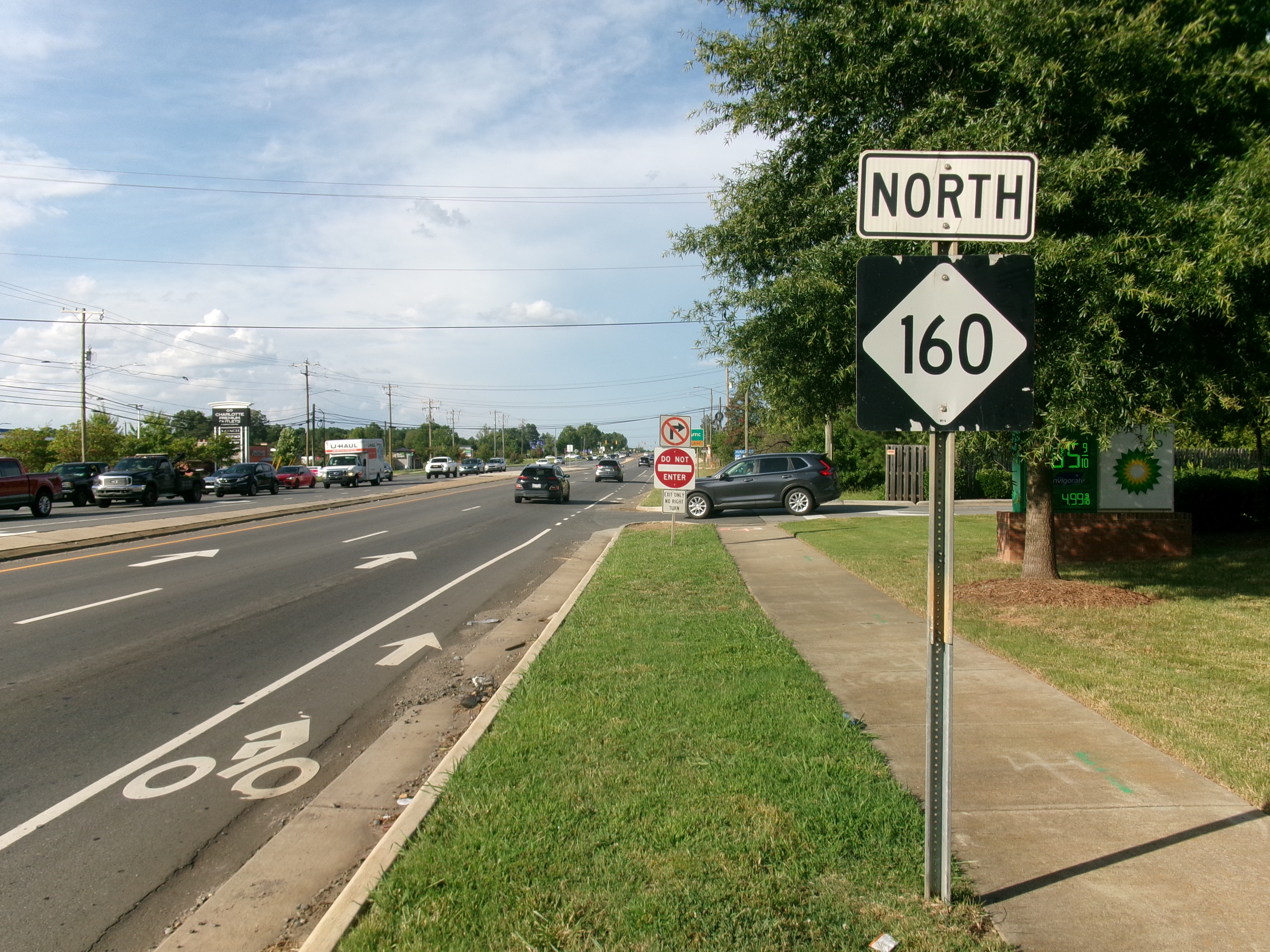
NC 160 northbound near the I-485 interchange at Steele Creek

One mile (1.6 km) after leaving the airport area, NC 160 crosses over Billy Graham Parkway, formerly U.S. Route 521 (US 521), now part of Charlotte Highway 4. NC 160 goes on a few more miles through the urban area of west Charlotte before crossing over the Bill Lee Freeway (I-77/US 21). At this interchange (exit 9A), there are only exits from the southbound lanes of the freeway and entrances onto the northbound lanes of the freeway. To access I-77/US 21 southbound or to access NC 160 from northbound I-77/US 21, one must take an alternate route like Remount Road (exit 8).

NC 160 continues on a northeasterly direction toward Uptown Charlotte. Its eastern terminus is at South Tryon Street (NC 49) nearly one mile (1.6 km) southwest of center city. The road, West Boulevard, continues on as East Boulevard at this terminus. Turning north on NC 49 will take the driver to Uptown (downtown).

== History ==
Established in 1942 as a new primary routing, NC 160 was a mere 2 miles (3.2 km), connecting NC 49 to SC 160 on the South Carolina state line. Before its establishment, it was a secondary road connecting to then SC 211 (1939–1942). Between 1956–58, NC 160 was extended north along Steele Creek Road and Morris Field Drive to Wilkinson Boulevard (US 29/US 74). In 1967, NC 160 was rerouted east along West Boulevard to its current north terminus at NC 49 near Uptown Charlotte. In the late-1970s, the section near the Charlotte Douglas Airport was moved slightly south to allow airport expansion. Another relocation around a new Norfolk Southern intermodal facility yard near the Charlotte Douglas Airport was constructed between 2010 and 2012.

== Junction list ==
The entire route is in Charlotte, Mecklenburg County.

mi	km	Destinations	Notes
0.0	0.0	SC 160 east – Fort Mill	South Carolina state line
2.0	3.2	NC 49 (South Tryon Street) – York	
7.0	11.3	I-485 – Pineville, Huntersville	
11.3	18.2	Billy Graham Parkway – Charlotte Douglas Int'l Airport	
14.3	23.0	I-77 north / US 21 north – Statesville	Southbound exit and northbound entrance
14.9	24.0	NC 49 (South Tryon Street)	
1.000 mi = 1.609 km; 1.000 km = 0.621 mi: Incomplete access
