= Stan Brookshire =

American politician

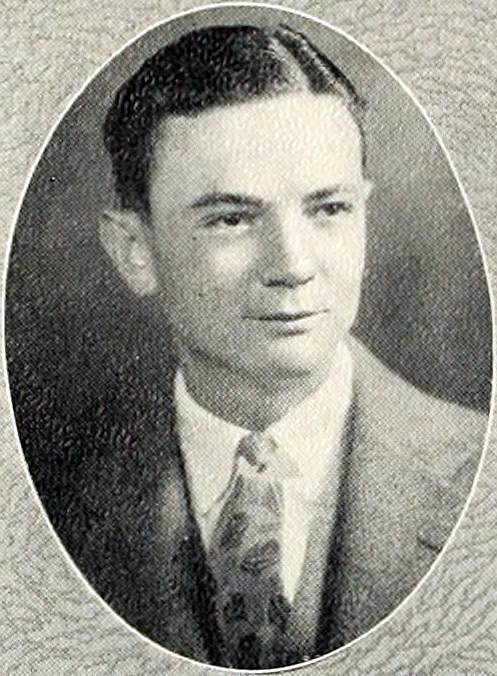
- 1927 Duke University senior photo

46th Mayor of Charlotte
- In office 1961–1969
- Preceded by: James Saxon Smith
- Succeeded by: John M. Belk

Personal details
- Born: Kenneth Rhyne Harris; July 22, 1905 Troutman, North Carolina, U.S.
- Died: October 10, 1990 (aged 85)
- Resting place: Evergreen Cemetery, Charlotte, North Carolina
- Party: Democratic
- Education: Duke University

Stanford Raynold Brookshire (July 22, 1905 – October 10, 1990) was a mayor of Charlotte, North Carolina.

Brookshire served as mayor from 1961 to 1969. He was the longest-serving mayor until 1975, when his immediate successor, John M. Belk, tied him by winning his fourth re-election, though Belk's fourth term would be extended another six months thanks to a change in state law.

A native of Troutman, North Carolina, Brookshire graduated from Duke University and came to Charlotte as a newspaper reporter. He led the Charlotte Chamber of Commerce (as would Belk) prior to becoming mayor.

The Brookshire Freeway, as well as Brookshire Boulevard (both parts of North Carolina Highway 16; the former is shared with Interstate 277), are named in honor of him, and he, along with Belk, is the subject of a book by Alex Coffin, entitled Brookshire & Belk: Businessmen in City Hall.
