= Salem Fork, North Carolina =

Unincorporated community in North Carolina, US

Coordinates: 36°23′38″N 80°47′13″W

Salem Fork is an unincorporated community in central Surry County, North Carolina, United States. The community is centered on the junction of Zephyr Road (SR 1001) and Interstate 77. Prominent landmarks in the community include Salem Fork Baptist Church and Salem Fork Church of Christ (Disciples of Christ). A growing commercial area is developing in the center of the community, including hotels and planned shops. This is due to the increased traffic volume from the interstate to the nearby Shelton Vineyards attraction and the expansion of some municipal services from the nearby town of Dobson.
