= Davidson House (Troutman, North Carolina) =

Historic house in North Carolina, United States

- U.S. National Register of Historic Places
- Location within North Carolina Location within the United States
- Location: SR 1337, near Troutman, North Carolina
- Coordinates: 35°44′55″N 80°54′57″W
- Area: 8.8 acres (3.6 ha)
- Built: c. 1805, c. 1830
- Architectural style: Federal
- MPS: Iredell County MRA
- NRHP reference No.: 80002880
- Added to NRHP: November 24, 1980

Davidson House is a historic home located near Troutman, Iredell County, North Carolina. The original section was built about 1805, and enlarged and remodeled in the Federal period about 1830. It is a 1 1/2-story, two bay by two bay, log dwelling sheathed in weatherboard. It has a hall and parlor plan, front shed porch, rear shed rooms and porch, and a single should brick chimney. Also on the property is a contributing two-story three-bay wide, half-dovetail log barn.

It was added to the National Register of Historic Places in 1980.
