= Claudia Belk =

American judge, lawyer, and philanthropist (1937–2017)

First Lady of Charlotte
- In office 1971–1977
- Mayor: John M. Belk

Personal details
- Born: Claudia Erwin Watkins; July 10, 1937 Durham, North Carolina, US
- Died: February 8, 2017 (aged 79)
- Party: Democratic
- Spouse: John M. Belk (m. 1971; died 2007)
- Children: 1
- Education: Hollins University; University of North Carolina School of Law
- Occupation: Judge; lawyer; philanthropist

Claudia Belk (born Claudia Erwin Watkins; July 10, 1937 – February 8, 2017) was an American judge, lawyer, and philanthropist. She was a prominent woman in North Carolina law and, as the wife of John M. Belk, served four-terms as First Lady of Charlotte.

== Early life and education ==
Claudia Erwin Watkins was born in Durham, North Carolina on July 10, 1937, the daughter of Warren Byers Watkins, a tobacco wholesaler. She graduated from Durham High School and went on to earn her undergraduate degree from Hollins College, now Hollins University, studied in Paris, and was one of two women to graduate from the University of North Carolina School of Law in 1963.

== Career ==
After graduating from law school, Belk opened her law practice. In 1968, she served as the assistant clerk for the Superior Court of Mecklenburg County. Belk was recognized in retrospect for the rarity of women practicing law at that time. She also became one of the first women elected to public office in the county when she won a race for district judge in 1968. Belk told an interviewer that she had some difficulties as "Mecklenburg's only lady judge", such as being called "Miss Judge", "Honey", or "Sir", as well as having to "shorten and 'slim down'" her robe. Belk also pushed back on the idea that, as a woman, she would be too emotional to make decisions in her domestic and juvenile court, remarking that she was educated for the job. Belk commented that it was "no big deal", and that she did not want to compromise her femininity for the job.

In 2000, it was announced that the public safety building at Central Piedmont Community College would be renamed the "Claudia Watkins Belk Center for Justice". Belk sat on the college's board, and the Belk Foundation had given $500,000 to the college. Classes in the building train students to become firefighters and police officers, among other professions.

In 2014, the Belk family donated to the Novant Health hospital, supporting the construction of the "John M. and Claudia W. Belk Heart and Vascular Institute".

== Personal life and death ==
In 1968, Watkins met John M. Belk, known as "Charlotte's most eligible bachelor", at a reception for the Democratic Women's Club. He was the CEO of the Belk department store chain, and was elected mayor of the city the following year. The couple married in 1971, with the wedding being reported as "the talk of the town". John's niece commented that "It was kind of like a made-for-TV match: Beautiful district court judge marries city mayor". The couple's only child, Mary Claudia, chairs the board of the John M. Belk Endowment and has worked for the Belk Foundation.

She was a member of the Daughters of the American Revolution.

Claudia Belk died on February 8, 2017.
