= Interstate 277 (North Carolina) =

Highway in North Carolina

Interstate 277
- Brookshire Freeway; John Belk Freeway
- I-277 highlighted in red

Route information
- Auxiliary route of I-77
- Maintained by NCDOT
- Length: 4.41 mi (7.10 km)
- Existed: 1981–present
- NHS: Entire route

Major junctions
- South end: I-77 / US 21 / US 74 / NC 27
- US 74 / NC 27; US 29 / NC 49
- North end: I-77 / US 21 / NC 16

Location
- Country: United States
- State: North Carolina
- Counties: Mecklenburg

Highway system
- Interstate Highway System; Main; Auxiliary; Suffixed; Business; Future; North Carolina Highway System; Interstate; US; State; Scenic
← US 276	→ NC 279

Interstate 277 (I-277) is a 4.41-mile (7.10 km) auxiliary Interstate Highway and partial beltway around Uptown Charlotte, North Carolina, United States. Both termini exist at interchanges with I-77.

== Route description ==
I-277 outbound passing through Uptown Charlotte

Starting at the exit 9 interchange on I-77/US 21, the route begins in concurrency with US 74/NC 27 as it goes counter-clockwise around Uptown Charlotte. Known as the John Belk Freeway, this section of the interstate is above-grade at both ends, but below-grade of local streets in the middle, with office and residential buildings flanking both sides. At mile marker 1.6, the freeway turns from a southeasterly to northeasterly direction. At approximately the midpoint of the route, the freeway splits two-lanes left to continue along I-277/NC 16 via the Brookshire Freeway and two-lanes right to continue along US 74/NC 27 via the Independence Expressway/Boulevard. At mile marker 2.8, the freeway turns from a northeasterly to northwesterly direction. The Brookshire Freeway is mostly above-grade with a viaduct over a diamond crossing of CSX and Norfolk Southern. The route ends at the exit 11 interchange on I-77/US 21, with NC 16 (Brookshire Freeway/Boulevard) continuing northwesterly towards I-85.

I-277 is signed both north–south and with inner–outer directions. Lane counts vary from six to eight, with a posted speed limit mostly throughout at 50 mph (80 km/h). The interstate is one of three partial/full ring roads serving the city, the other two being Charlotte Route 4 and I-485.

== History ==
=== Northwest Expressway / Brookshire Freeway ===
As part of the urban renewal plans of both Greenville and First Ward in the 1960s, the Northwest Expressway was a proposed freeway from Bellhaven Boulevard, east of I-85, to Independence Boulevard, east of Central Avenue, removing cross-through traffic in Uptown Charlotte. The first segment of the Northwest Expressway opened by 1968, from Graham Street to Central Avenue and had no interchanges. By 1970, interchanges for Tryon Street to Davidson Street were added. By 1971, the freeway was extended east from Central Avenue to Independence Boulevard with an interchange and connector south to Trade Street. By 1972, a western segment of the Northwest Expressway opened between Bellhaven Boulevard to newly constructed I-77; and by 1973, the gap between I-77 and Graham Street was constructed, completing the Northwest Expressway. On August 1, 1974, NCDOT rerouted NC 16 onto the Northwest Expressway, from Bellhaven Boulevard to Graham Street. On September 8, 1975, the Northwest Expressway was renamed to Brookshire Freeway, in honor of Stan Brookshire, Mayor of Charlotte from 1961–1969.

=== John Belk Freeway ===
A freeway removing cross-through traffic along Independence Boulevard through Uptown Charlotte was first proposed during the 1960s urban renewal of Brooklyn/Second Ward. In June 1978, the American Association of State Highway and Transportation Officials (AASHTO) approved the designation of I-277 for the freeway, that would begin at the intersection of I-77 and US 74, travel counter-clockwise around Uptown Charlotte, and onto Brookshire Freeway, to end at the intersection of I-77 and NC 16. That same year, the interchange with Central Avenue was permanently closed and the interchange and connector to Trade Street was closed for reconstruction. On September 11, 1981, the new freeway was named the John Belk Freeway, in honor of John M. Belk, businessperson and Mayor of Charlotte from 1969–1977. The first segment of the John Belk Freeway opened sometime between 1982 and 1984, it followed the former connector from the Brookshire Freeway south to 3rd/4th streets and Independence Boulevard. It is around this time signage for I-277 appeared on both the John Belk and Brookshire freeways; also in 1982, NC 16 was rerouted from Graham Street to 3rd and 4th streets, eliminating its former alignment along Graham, Trade, Elizabeth, and Hawthorne.

By 1988, the rest of the John Belk Freeway was completed from the I-77/US 21 and US 74 interchange to 3rd/4th streets and Independence Boulevard; this included a new interchange (exit 1E) for College Street and Independence Boulevard (the later becoming an extension of South Boulevard) and a reconfiguration of Independence Boulevard immediately exiting at exit 1D from I-77 (later becoming Carson Boulevard). In 1990, US 74 was rerouted into a concurrency with I-277 along the John Belk Freeway from exit 1D to exit 2B; Independence Boulevard through Uptown Charlotte was eventually renamed at various sections by either extensions of other existing roads or renamed entirely.

=== 21st century ===
I-277, as well as parts of I-77 and I-85, was notorious for being dark at night because its streetlights were not in working order. There were many different plans to replace the streetlights on this freeway, most of which had been in place since the early 1970s. A proposal to replace the streetlights with solar power was denied in 2007 because these lights weren't deemed bright enough (however, two solar-powered streetlights were operating on I-77 at the LaSalle Street exit until November 2007 and mounted on the same poles as their older counterparts but halfway down), so new electric-powered high-pressure sodium (HPS) streetlights would have to be installed instead. A relighting project finally got underway in October 2008, which involved setting up new light towers at the Independence Boulevard and I-77 exits, as well as installating new lights and removing the old nonworking ones on the Brookshire portion of the Interstate. This project was completed by the spring of 2009. A similar project was also done for the Belk portion of the Interstate. In addition, highly reflective signs were also installed on the entire loop to give drivers better vision at night without the aid of additional lighting. In 2018, new LED high-masts were installed at the southern I-77, South Boulevard, and Independence Boulevard interchanges, as part of a statewide conversion project; as of 2019, the HPS lights on both I-277 and the Independence Expressway approach have been replaced with LED.

In April 2010, the new color-coded attraction guide signs were added along I-77 and I-277 to help visitors reach popular destinations, including: Bank of America Stadium, Spectrum Center, and the NASCAR Hall of Fame among others.

On September 1, 2019, the inner lanes of I-277 and their associated ramps were closed to vehicles for the first time, as part of a route for the city's inaugural Around the Crown 10K marathon that took place entirely in Uptown Charlotte. The runners raced counterclockwise on the Interstate between the Hill Street onramp to the Belk and the 11th Street offramp from the Brookshire.

In November 2019, as part of the I-77 Express Lanes project, new entrance/exit ramps connecting the Brookshire Freeway were officially opened since construction began to reconfigure the exit 5 interchange in 2018. The two new flyover ramps connect directly to the Express Lanes that traverse north towards Huntersville, Cornelius, Davidson, and Mooresville. The project also made modifications to the existing interchange ramps, which included reconstruction of an existing flyover from I-277/NC 16 north onto I-77/US 21 south.

In 2021, NC 27 was rerouted onto the John Belk Freeway between Freedom Drive and Independence Expressway; its former alignment along Morehead, McDowell, and 7th Street were transitioned to secondary roads.

== Exit list ==
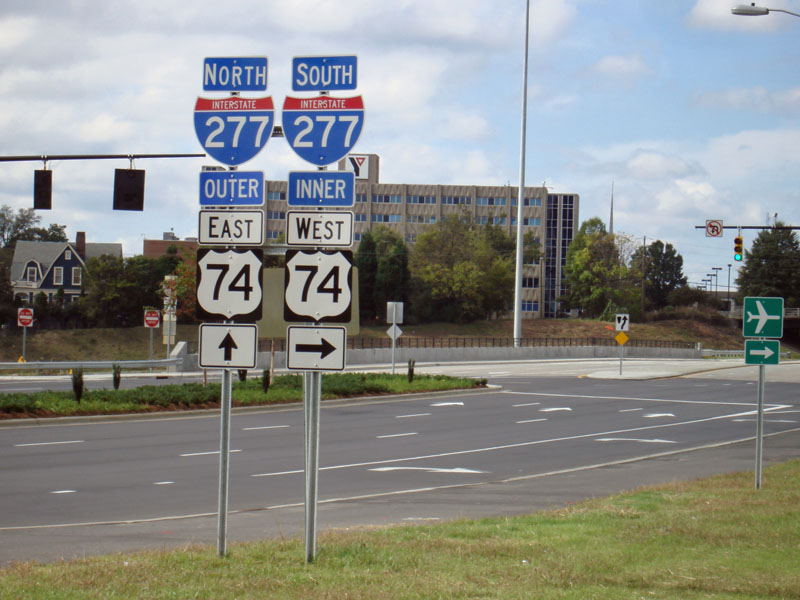
I-277/US 74 directional signs at South Boulevard and Stonewall Street; note the "North/South" and "Inner/Outer" banners being displayed concurrently

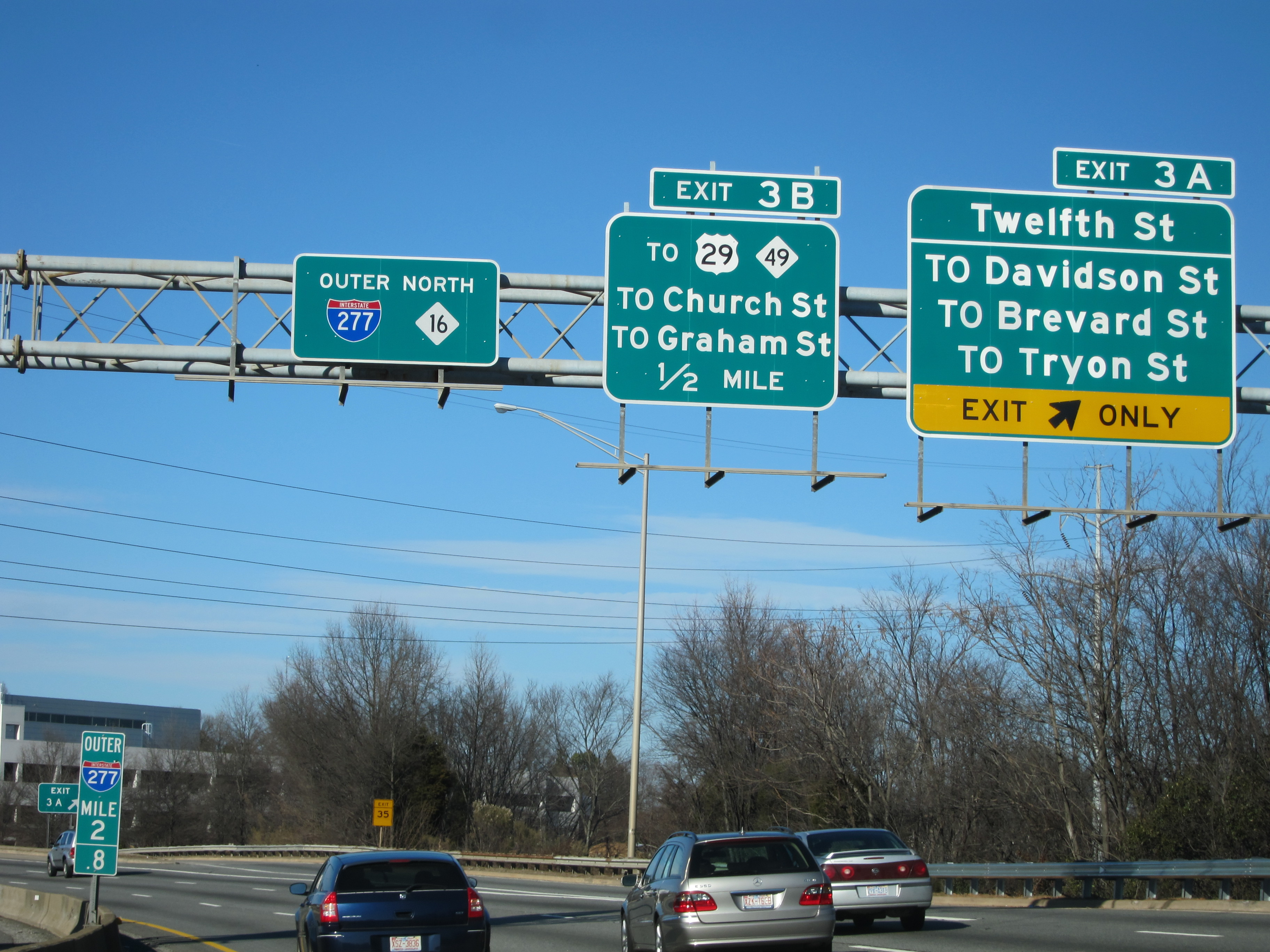
Typical overhead sign and milemarker along Brookshire Freeway

The entire route is in Charlotte, Mecklenburg County.

mi	km	Exit	Destinations	Notes
0.0	0.0	—	US 74 west (Wilkinson Boulevard)	Continuation as US 74
0.0	0.0	1A	NC 27 west to US 29 / Freedom Drive	West end of NC 27 overlap; southbound exit and northbound entrance
0.1	0.16	1B	I-77 south / US 21 south – Columbia	
0.1	0.16	1C	I-77 north / US 21 north – Statesville	
0.6	0.97	1D	Carson Boulevard	Northbound exit and entrance only
1.0	1.6	1E	Northbound: College Street, South Boulevard, Caldwell Street Southbound: Brooklyn Village Avenue, Kenilworth Avenue, South Boulevard, Caldwell Street	Brooklyn Village Avenue was known as Stonewall Street until 2021
1.9	3.1	2A	NC 16 south (Third Street / Fourth Street) / Kenilworth Avenue	South end of NC 16 overlap
2.7	4.3	2B	US 74 east / NC 27 east (Independence Expressway)	East end of US 74 and NC 27 overlap; semi-directional T interchange
3.2	5.1	3A	Northbound: Twelfth Street, Davidson Street, Brevard Street, Tryon Street Southbound: Brevard Street, Davidson Street, McDowell Street	
3.6	5.8	3B	Northbound: To US 29 / NC 49 (Graham Street) / Church Street Southbound: Eleventh Street, Church Street, Tryon Street	To AvidxChange Music Factory
3.8	6.1	4	US 29 / NC 49 (Graham Street)	Southbound exit and northbound entrance
4.4	7.1	5A	I-77 north / US 21 north to I-85 north – Statesville	
4.4	7.1	5B	I-77 north (Express Lanes)	Northbound exit and southbound entrance of HOV3+/toll lanes
4.4	7.1	5C	I-77 south / US 21 south – Columbia	Northbound left exit
4.4	7.1	—	NC 16 north (Brookshire Freeway) to I-85 south	Continuation as NC 16
1.000 mi = 1.609 km; 1.000 km = 0.621 mi: Concurrency terminus; HOV only; Incomplete access

== See also ==
- Bank of America Corporate Center
- Bank of America Stadium
- Duke Energy Center
- NASCAR Hall of Fame
- One Wells Fargo Center
- Spectrum Center
