= Becky Meacham-Richardson =

American politician

Member of the South Carolina House of Representatives from the 48th district
- In office 1996–2002

Personal details
- Party: Republican

Rebecca D. "Becky" Meacham-Richardson is an American politician who served in the South Carolina House of Representatives from the 48th district from 1996 to 2002.

== Political positions ==
In the legislature she worked on justice reform. Meacham-Richardson endorsed the Donald Trump presidential campaign in the 2024 United States presidential election.

== Legacy ==
A section of the South Carolina Highway 460 is known as the Becky Meacham-Richardson Highway.

== Personal life ==
Her husband J. R. "Dick" Richardson died in 2008.
