= Barium Springs, North Carolina =

- Unincorporated community
- Location within North Carolina Location within the United States
- Coordinates: 35°43′08″N 80°53′53″W
- Country: United States
- State: North Carolina
- County: Iredell
- Elevation: 948 ft (289 m)
- Time zone: UTC-5 (Eastern (EST))
  - Summer (DST): UTC-4 (EDT)
- ZIP code: 28010
- Area code: 704
- GNIS feature ID: 1018963

Barium Springs is an unincorporated community in Iredell County, North Carolina, United States. The community is located on the northern border of Troutman along U.S. Route 21. Barium Springs has a post office, with ZIP code 28010.

Native Americans named the area Poison Springs, which later became the name of the community's first post office. After a mineral spa opened there in the 1880s, the community changed its name to emphasize the medicinal properties of the barium and other minerals in its waters.

Barium Springs is the site of the Barium Springs Home for Children, a home for disadvantaged and troubled children.
