= John M. Belk =

American politician

47th Mayor of Charlotte
- In office 1969–1977
- Preceded by: Stanford R. Brookshire
- Succeeded by: Kenneth R. Harris

Personal details
- Born: March 29, 1920
- Died: August 17, 2007 (aged 87)
- Party: Democratic Party
- Spouse: Claudia Watkins (m. 1971–2007)
- Occupation: businessman

John Montgomery Belk (March 29, 1920 – August 17, 2007) was an American businessman. He was head of the Belk, Inc. department store chain and member of the Democratic Party, he served as the mayor of Charlotte, North Carolina for four terms (1969–1977). He was the son of William Henry Belk, who founded the first Belk store in Monroe, North Carolina, in 1888.

== Background ==
He was the longest-serving mayor of the city of Charlotte until Pat McCrory was elected to a fifth term. McCrory eventually left office in 2009, after his record seventh term. When Belk was reelected for the fourth time, he tied his immediate predecessor, Stan Brookshire, for the most terms as mayor (Brookshire was the mayor from 1961 to 1969), but a change in state law extended Belk's term six months longer than Brookshire's.

Before he was mayor, Belk served on Brookshire's staff as the President of the Charlotte Chamber of Commerce.

The John Belk Freeway, part of Interstate 277, is named in honor of him, and it connects to the Brookshire Freeway, also a part of I-277. Also, Brookshire & Belk: Businessmen in City Hall, a book written by Alex Coffin, chronicles the achievements of the two former mayors during their combined eight terms in office.

Belk was also a member of the board of trustees of his alma mater, Davidson College, for almost 50 years. Davidson's sports arena is named John M. Belk Arena in his honor.
