= Charlotte Route 4 =

Road in Charlotte, North Carolina, US

Route 4

Route information
- Maintained by NCDOT and CDOT
- Length: 18.6 mi (29.9 km)

Major junctions
- West end: I-85 in Westerly Hills
- US 29 / US 74 near Westerly Hills; I-77 / US 21 in Clanton Park-Roseland; US 74 / NC 27 in Eastway-Sheffield Park; US 29 / NC 49 in Sugar Creek
- East end: I-85 in Sugar Creek

Location
- Country: United States
- State: North Carolina

Highway system
- North Carolina Highway System; Interstate; US; State; Scenic

Route 4 is an 18.6-mile (29.9 km) partial ring road located in Charlotte, North Carolina. Beginning and ending at Interstate 85 (I-85), it loops south around Uptown Charlotte along state-maintained secondary roads, connecting the Charlotte Douglas International Airport and several city neighborhoods including Madison Park, Myers Park, Windsor Park and Sugar Creek. The route is posted by the Charlotte Department of Transportation (CDOT), using a modified pentagonal county road shield, with a green background and the city's crown logo above the number. The loop has a radius of about 4 miles (6.4 km), hence the number.

== Route description ==
The west end of Route 4 is at exit 33 of I-85; local traffic can continue north on the short Mulberry Church Road. This part of Route 4 is named Billy Graham Parkway, after evangelist Billy Graham, and is a limited-access road, meaning that abutting property owners cannot construct driveways. After crossing Scott Futrell Drive, the south frontage road of I-85, the parkway crosses over Wilkinson Boulevard (US 29/US 74); access between the two roads is indirect, via Boyer Street, Morris Field Drive or another piece of Mulberry Church Road. The few intersections on Billy Graham Parkway include a trumpet interchange with Josh Birmingham Parkway, the main access to Charlotte/Douglas International Airport, an intersection with West Boulevard (NC 160), and a partial cloverleaf interchange with Tyvola Road near Paul Buck Boulevard (near the former site of the Charlotte Coliseum). Billy Graham Parkway ends at South Tryon Street (NC 49), where Route 4 continues east on Woodlawn Road. Woodlawn Road crosses Bill Lee Freeway (I-77/US 21).

Access to the Freeway is unique, with southbound Route 4 drivers needing to go on South Tryon Street (North) to access I-77/US 21 North.

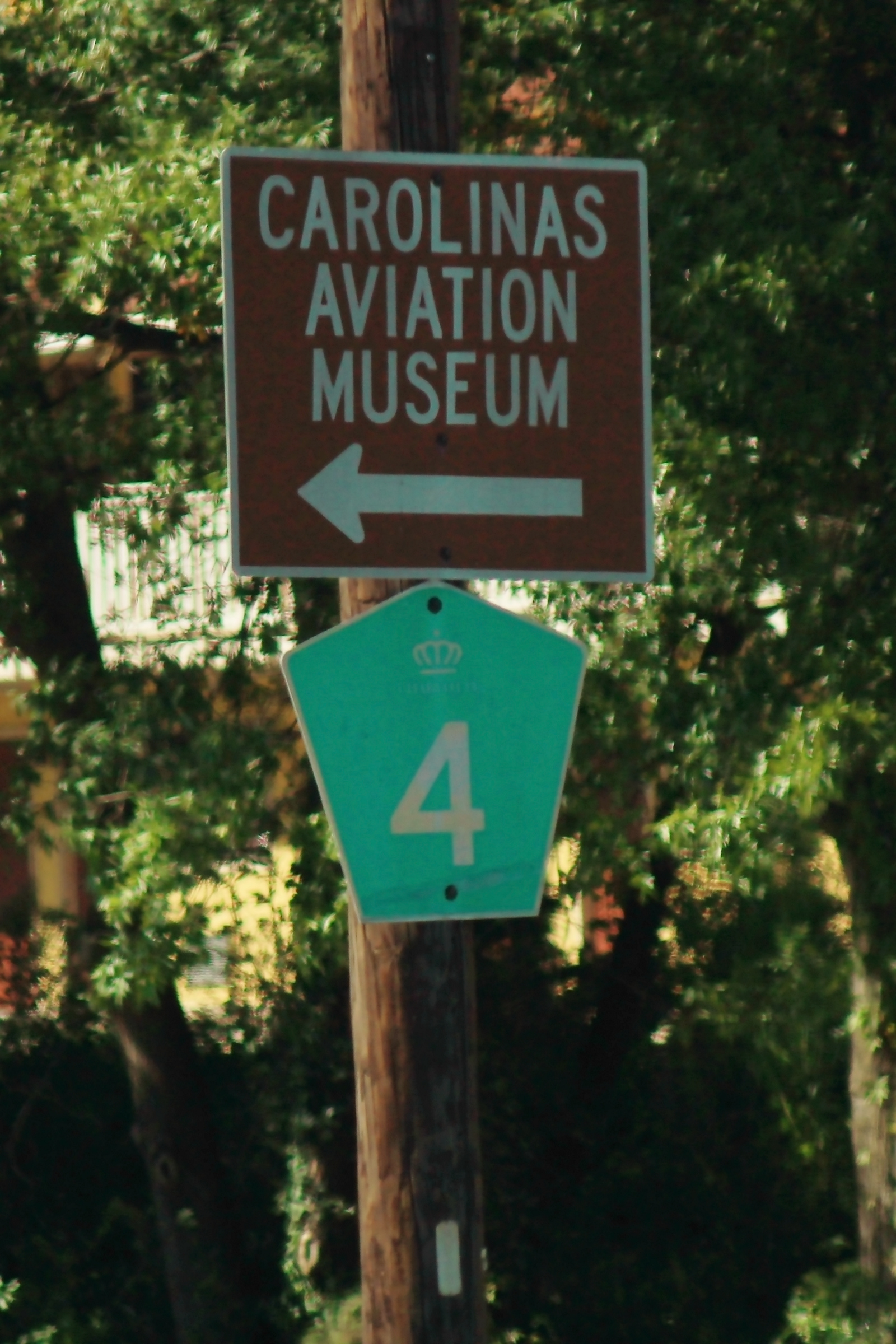
Charlotte Route 4 signage

Woodlawn Road, and the rest of Route 4, is a more typical four-lane arterial road with numerous driveways. Shortly after crossing I-77/US 21, Route 4 meets South Boulevard, where US 521 used to turn south off Woodlawn Road (coming from Billy Graham Parkway). The road continues east, eventually crossing Selwyn Avenue and becoming Runnymede Lane, which ends at Sharon Road after several curves. A short jog north on Sharon Road takes Route 4 to the beginning of Wendover Road; in either direction, two lanes turn to and from Sharon Road, maintaining a four-lane cross section on Route 4. Wendover Road soon crosses Providence Road (NC 16), and becomes Eastway Drive at a cloverleaf interchange with Independence Boulevard (US 74/NC 27). Eastway Drive runs north to North Tryon Street (US 29/NC 49), but Route 4 does not follow the entire road, instead forking northwest on Sugar Creek Road. Unlike the turns at Sharon Road, this turn only has one lane in each direction. Sugar Creek Road crosses North Tryon Street (US 29/NC 49) and then I-85 (Julius Chambers Highway) at exit 41, where Route 4 ends. The road however continues north through Derita, leading part of the way to Huntersville.

Signing for Route 4 is very scarce from intersecting roads, and neither I-85 nor I-77 recognize Route 4 on exit signs for the road. However, Route 4 does have reassurance signs posted along the route, including at all turns. There are Route 4 shields at the tops of the I-85 northbound and southbound exit ramps at Exit 33.

== History ==
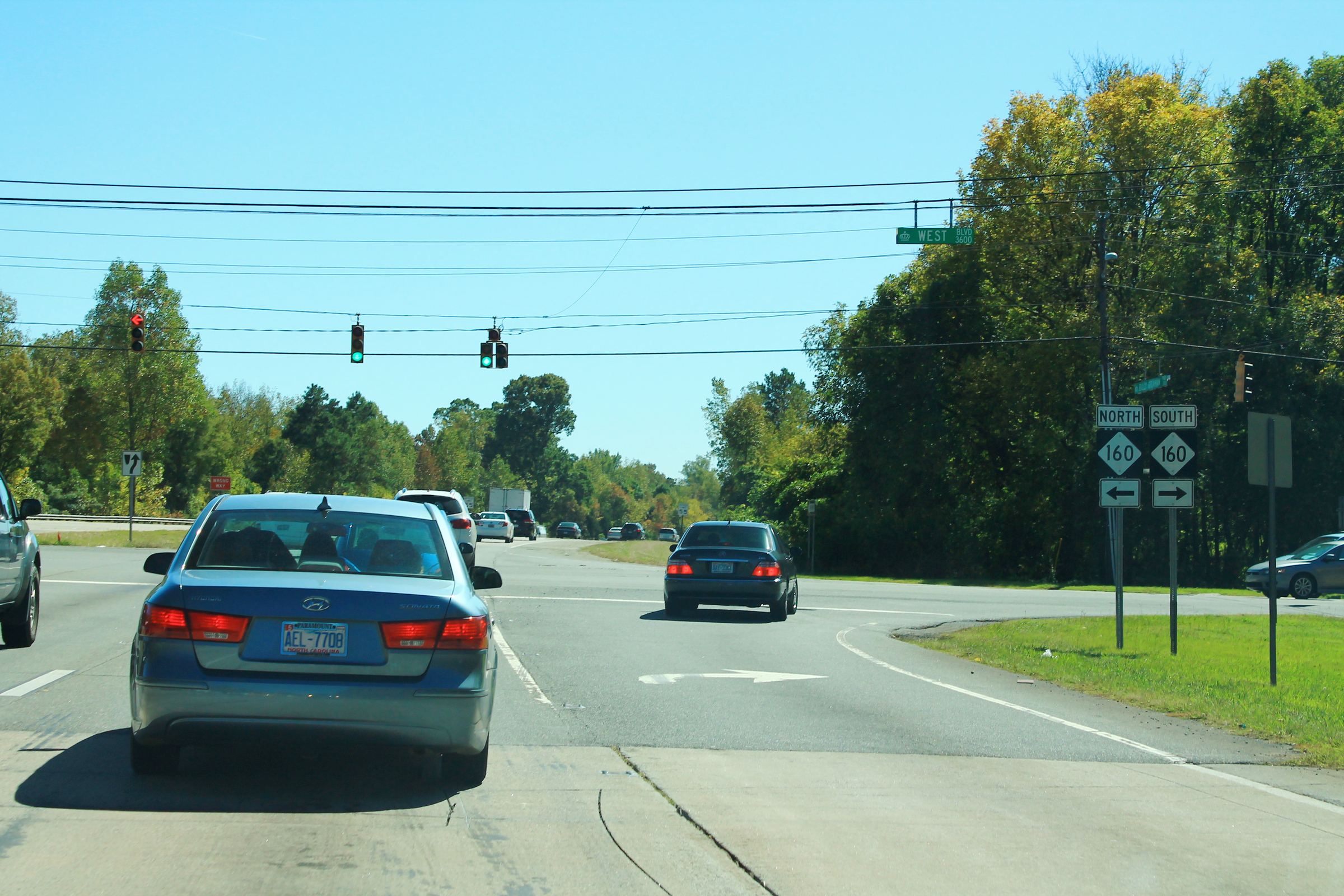
Charlotte Route 4 (Billy Graham Parkway) at NC 160

The idea of a ring around uptown, roughly along what were the city limits at the time, was first suggested in the 1960 city transportation plan. In order to implement this, a number of existing two-lane roads around the south and east sides of Charlotte were connected and widened. Woodlawn Road, then running from Tryon Street (NC 49) east to Fairfax Drive, was through-routed with Runnymede Lane via a new bridge across Briar Creek and a short piece of Barclay Downs Drive. Wendover Road was extended northeast from its end at Randolph Road to Independence Boulevard (US 74), absorbing a short piece of Beal Street (east of Ellington Street) and most of Brookhurst Drive (Monroe Road to just shy of Independence Boulevard). Eastway Drive was already complete, and Sugar Creek Road only required a railroad bridge between The Plaza and Atmore Street, which allowed the short Highway Place to become part of Sugar Creek Road. These roads, along with a proposed southwestern segment that would partially replace Yorkmont Road, were added to the state highway system (where not already part of it) as secondary roads, and, except for Sugar Creek Road, to the federal-aid primary system. Not every turn was eliminated; plans for a straighter Runnymede Lane west of Colony Road and a bypass of Sharon Road were not carried through.

The first portions to be completed as four-lane roads were Woodlawn Road and the segment north of Monroe Road, including the cloverleaf interchange with Independence Boulevard, where there had been a five-way intersection (with Commonwealth Avenue crossing through). The rest of the eastern half was finished in the late 1970s, at which time the Charlotte DOT chose the "Route 4" label, in order to give the road one designation but avoid renaming the existing street names. The remainder of the loop was completed in 1981, connecting to an existing I-85 interchange that served Mulberry Church Road, and was named after Reverend Billy Graham, a Charlotte-born evangelist. This portion, being a new roadway, was built to higher standards, with interchanges at several major intersections and no driveway access. US 521, which had ended uptown at US 29 via mainly South Boulevard, was moved onto the Billy Graham Parkway via a short piece of Woodlawn Road, taking US 521 to a new terminus at I-85 west of uptown. The American Association of State Highway and Transportation Officials approved truncating US 521 to I-485, the new outer beltway, in May 2003, making the entire length of Route 4 a secondary road.

== Major intersections ==
The entire route is in Charlotte, Mecklenburg County.

mi	km	Destinations	Notes
0.00	0.00	I-85 – Gastonia, Concord	Western terminus; exit 33 (I-85); road continues north as Mulberry Church Road
0.50	0.80	To US 29 / US 74 (Wilkinson Boulevard) / Boyer Street – Bank of America Stadium	
1.19	1.92	Charlotte Douglas International Airport	Interchange
2.34	3.77	NC 160 (West Boulevard)	To Airport cargo terminal and NC National Guard
3.23	5.20	Tyvola Road	Interchange; to Farmers Market and VA Health Care Center
5.13	8.26	NC 49 (Tryon Street) to I-77 north / US 21 north – Charlotte	
5.30	8.53	I-77 south / US 21 south – Rock Hill	Exit 6A (I-77)
10.10	16.25	NC 16 (Providence Road)	
12.70	20.44	US 74 / NC 27 (Independence Expressway) to I-277	Cloverleaf interchange; exit 245 (US 74)
17.18	27.65	US 29 / NC 49 (Tryon Street)	
18.61	29.95	I-85 – Concord, Gastonia	Eastern terminus; exit 41 (I-85); road continues north as Sugar Creek Road
1.000 mi = 1.609 km; 1.000 km = 0.621 mi

== See also ==
- Interstate 277, Charlotte's inner freeway loop
- Interstate 485, Charlotte's outer freeway loop
