= Troutman, North Carolina =

- Town
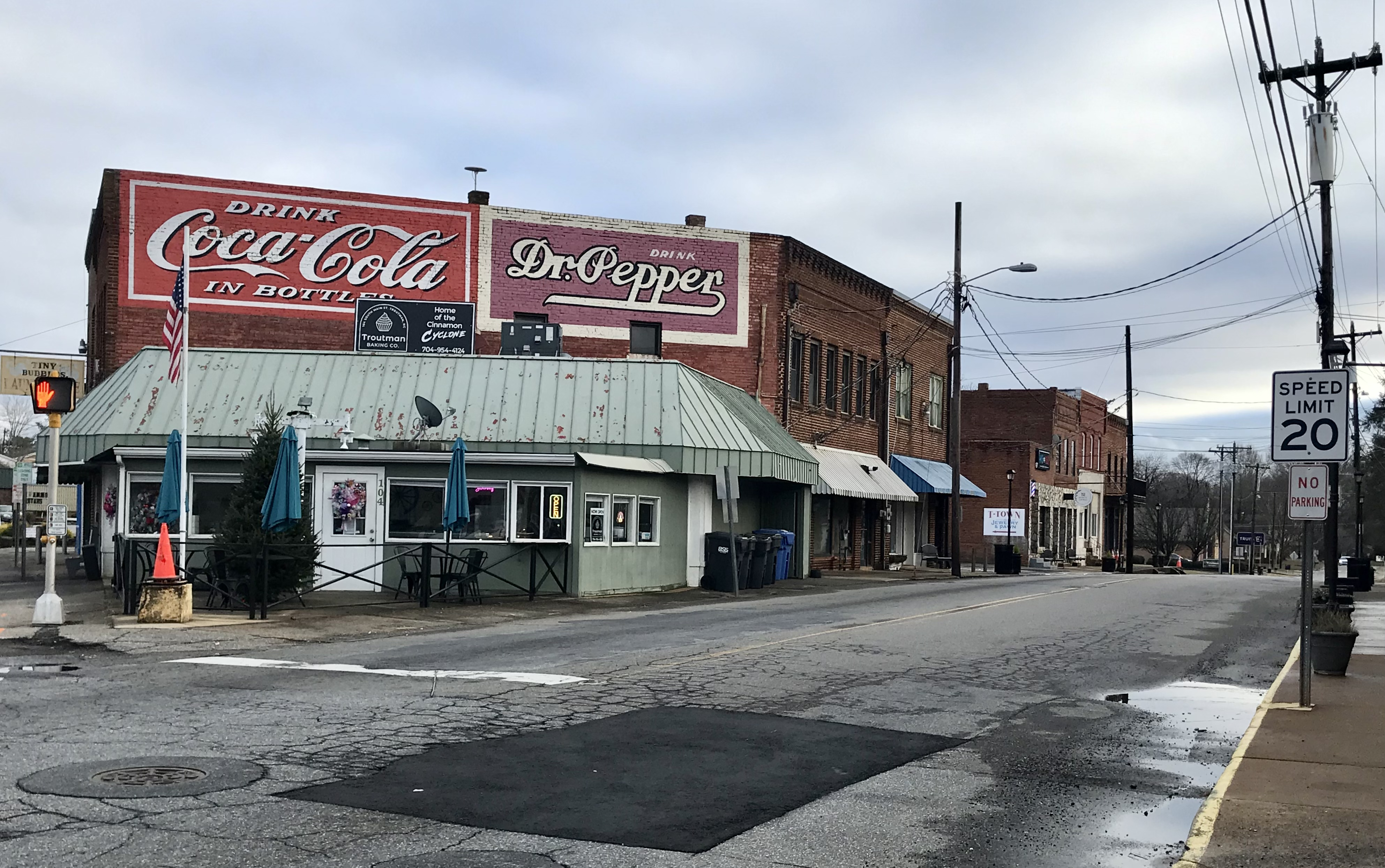
- Wagner Street

- Seal
- Motto: "Enjoy Lake Norman...Naturally"
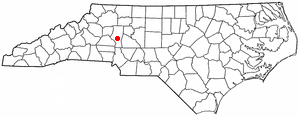
- Location of Troutman, North Carolina
- Coordinates: 35°41′54″N 80°53′23″W
- Country: United States
- State: North Carolina
- County: Iredell
- Settled: 1859
- Incorporated: 1905
- Named for: Annie Troutman

Government
  - Mayor: Teross Young

Area
  - Total: 6.56 sq mi (17.00 km^{2})
  - Land: 6.55 sq mi (16.97 km^{2})
  - Water: 0.012 sq mi (0.03 km^{2})
- Elevation: 906 ft (276 m)

Population (2020)
  - Total: 3,698
  - Density: 564.3/sq mi (217.88/km^{2})
- Time zone: UTC-5 (Eastern (EST))
  - Summer (DST): UTC-4 (EDT)
- ZIP code: 28166
- Area code: 704
- FIPS code: 37-68500
- GNIS feature ID: 2406757
- Website: www.troutmannc.gov

Troutman is a town in Iredell County, North Carolina, United States. The town is located roughly 35 miles (56 km) north of Charlotte. As of the 2020 census the town's population was 3,698. Due to substantial residential growth in the area, as well as neighborhood annexation, the town is experiencing dramatic population growth. Approved residential developments, when completed, are forecast to increase town population to more than 11,000 residents.

== History ==
The Davidson House was added to the National Register of Historic Places in 1980.

== Geography ==
Troutman is located in south-central Iredell County. U.S. Route 21 passes through the center of the town, leading north 6 miles (10 km) to Statesville, the county seat, and south 10 miles (16 km) to Mooresville. Interstate 77 passes 3 miles (5 km) east of the town, with access from Exit 42.

According to the United States Census Bureau, the town has a total area of 5.4 square miles (13.9 km^{2}), of which 0.03 square miles (0.07 km^{2}), or 0.50%, are water.

== Demographics ==
Historical population
Census	Pop.	Note	%±
1880	71		—
1910	230		—
1920	342		48.7%
1930	432		26.3%
1940	566		31.0%
1950	613		8.3%
1960	648		5.7%
1970	797		23.0%
1980	1,360		70.6%
1990	1,493		9.8%
2000	1,592		6.6%
2010	2,383		49.7%
2020	3,698		55.2%
2030 (est.)	11,063	▲	199.2%
U.S. Decennial Census

=== 2020 census ===
Troutman racial composition
Race	Number	Percentage
White or European American (non-Hispanic)	2,660	71.93%
Black or African American (non-Hispanic)	537	14.52%
Native American	7	0.19%
Asian	57	1.54%
Pacific Islander	1	0.03%
Other/Mixed	164	4.43%
Hispanic or Latino	272	7.36%

As of the 2020 census, Troutman had a population of 3,698. The median age was 38.1 years. 25.3% of residents were under the age of 18 and 13.7% of residents were 65 years of age or older. For every 100 females there were 96.9 males, and for every 100 females age 18 and over there were 90.7 males age 18 and over.

77.9% of residents lived in urban areas, while 22.1% lived in rural areas.

There were 1,378 households in Troutman, of which 39.1% had children under the age of 18 living in them. Of all households, 55.6% were married-couple households, 13.3% were households with a male householder and no spouse or partner present, and 24.9% were households with a female householder and no spouse or partner present. About 21.8% of all households were made up of individuals and 9.4% had someone living alone who was 65 years of age or older.

There were 1,460 housing units, of which 5.6% were vacant. The homeowner vacancy rate was 1.3% and the rental vacancy rate was 3.6%.

=== 2000 census ===
As of the census of 2000, there were 1,592 people, 638 households, and 449 families residing in the town. The population density was 765.5 inhabitants per square mile (295.6/km^{2}). There were 695 housing units at an average density of 334.2 per square mile (129.0/km^{2}). The racial makeup of the town was 70.73% White, 28.02% African American, 0.31% Native American, 0.25% Asian, 0.19% from other races, and 0.50% from two or more races. Hispanic or Latino of any race were 0.31% of the population.

There were 638 households, out of which 30.4% had children under the age of 18 living with them, 52.0% were married couples living together, 12.5% had a female householder with no husband present, and 29.6% were non-families. 25.7% of all households were made up of individuals, and 10.0% had someone living alone who was 65 years of age or older. The average household size was 2.50 and the average family size was 2.99.

In the town, the population was spread out, with 24.6% under the age of 18, 7.9% from 18 to 24, 28.0% from 25 to 44, 24.9% from 45 to 64, and 14.8% who were 65 years of age or older. The median age was 39 years. For every 100 females, there were 92.0 males. For every 100 females age 18 and over, there were 89.7 males.

The median income for a household in the town was $41,786, and the median income for a family was $47,569. Males had a median income of $31,071 versus $22,813 for females. The per capita income for the town was $19,261. About 5.2% of families and 6.0% of the population were below the poverty line, including 6.6% of those under age 18 and 4.7% of those age 65 or over.

== Notable people ==
- Jim Lauderdale, singer-songwriter
- Josh Richeson, NASCAR driver
