= Tega Cay, South Carolina =

- City
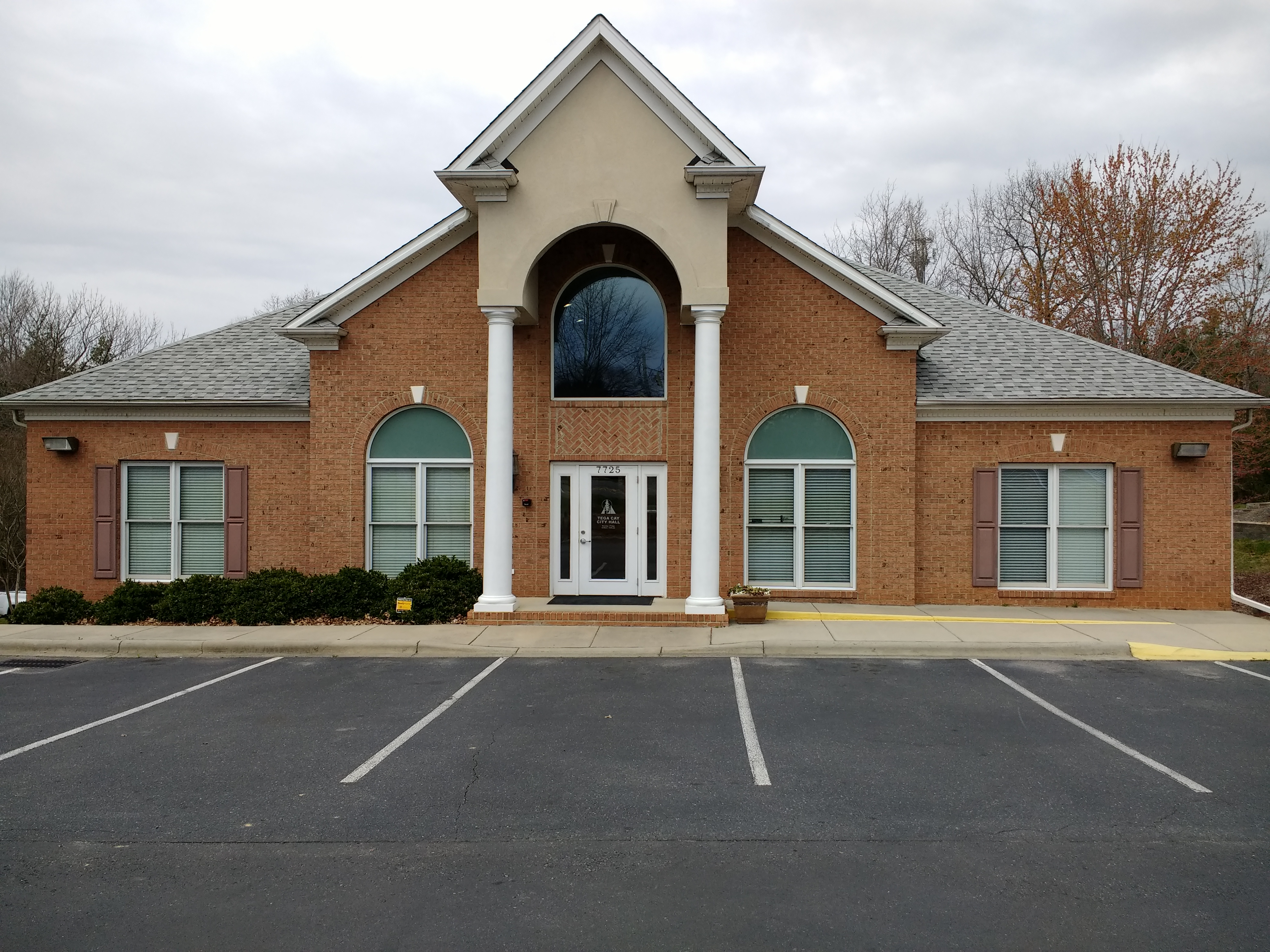
- Tega Cay City Hall

- Seal
- Motto: "The Good Life"
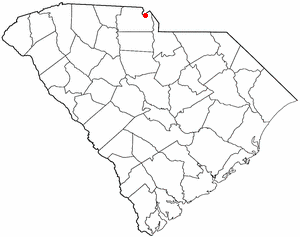
- Location of Tega Cay, South Carolina
- Coordinates: 35°02′18″N 81°00′12″W
- Country: United States
- State: South Carolina
- County: York

Government
  - Type: City

Area
  - Total: 4.49 sq mi (11.64 km^{2})
  - Land: 4.49 sq mi (11.62 km^{2})
  - Water: 0.0077 sq mi (0.02 km^{2})
- Elevation: 620 ft (190 m)

Population (2020)
  - Total: 12,832
  - Density: 2,859.3/sq mi (1,103.99/km^{2})
- Time zone: UTC-5 (Eastern (EST))
  - Summer (DST): UTC-4 (EDT)
- ZIP codes: 29708
- Area codes: 803, 839
- FIPS code: 45-71417
- GNIS feature ID: 2405575
- Website: www.tegacaysc.org

Tega Cay is a planned city in York County, South Carolina, United States, located west of Fort Mill and north of Rock Hill. It is a suburb of Charlotte, North Carolina. The population was recorded at 12,832 as of the 2020 U.S. Census.

Tega Cay is located on a peninsula along Lake Wylie, twenty miles south of Charlotte. The name Tega Cay allegedly comes from an unknown Polynesian language and means "Beautiful Peninsula", however, this is unconfirmed.

== Geography ==
According to the United States Census Bureau, the city has a total area of 3.2 square miles (8.2 km^{2}), of which 2.5 square miles (6.4 km^{2}) is land and 0.7 square mile (1.7 km^{2}) (21.27%) is water. The city has 13 mi (21 km) of shoreline. The hilly terrain is densely forested, containing many species of hardwoods and pines, and wildlife.

== Demographics ==
Historical population
Census	Pop.	Note	%±
1990	3,016		—
2000	4,044		34.1%
2010	7,620		88.4%
2020	12,832		68.4%
2025 (est.)	14,457	▲	12.7%
U.S. Decennial Census

=== 2020 census ===
As of the 2020 census, there were 12,832 people, 4,502 households, and 3,013 families residing in the city. The median age was 39.8 years; 29.7% of residents were under the age of 18 and 13.6% were 65 years of age or older. For every 100 females there were 95.2 males, and for every 100 females age 18 and over there were 91.7 males age 18 and over.

100.0% of residents lived in urban areas, while 0.0% lived in rural areas.

There were 4,502 households in Tega Cay, of which 47.3% had children under the age of 18 living in them. Of all households, 69.1% were married-couple households, 10.3% were households with a male householder and no spouse or partner present, and 16.9% were households with a female householder and no spouse or partner present. About 15.9% of all households were made up of individuals and 7.3% had someone living alone who was 65 years of age or older.

There were 4,653 housing units, of which 3.2% were vacant. The homeowner vacancy rate was 1.3% and the rental vacancy rate was 5.8%.

Racial composition as of the 2020 census
Race	Number	Percent
White	10,195	79.4%
Black or African American	547	4.3%
American Indian and Alaska Native	20	0.2%
Asian	952	7.4%
Native Hawaiian and Other Pacific Islander	3	0.0%
Some other race	181	1.4%
Two or more races	934	7.3%
Hispanic or Latino (of any race)	727	5.7%

=== 2000 census ===
As of the census of 2000, there were 4,044 people, 1,509 households, and 1,228 families residing in the city. The population density was 1,630 inhabitants per square mile (630/km^{2}). There were 1,577 housing units at an average density of 635.7 per square mile (245.4/km^{2}). The racial makeup of the city was 95.87% White, 2.13% African American, 0.82% Asian, 0.12% Native American, 0.10% Pacific Islander, 0.37% from other races, and 0.59% from two or more races. Hispanic or Latino within any race were 0.91% of the population.

There were 1,509 households, out of which 37.6% had children under the age of 18 living with them, 74.6% were married couples living together, 5.2% had a female householder with no husband present, and 18.6% were non-families. 15.0% of all households were made up of individuals, and 4.0% had someone living alone who was 65 years of age or older. The average household size was 2.68 and the average family size was 2.99.

In the city, the population was spread out, with 26.8% under the age of 18, 4.3% from 18 to 24, 29.1% from 25 to 44, 30.6% from 45 to 64, and 9.2% who were 65 years of age or older. The median age was 40 years. For every 100 females, there were 93.4 males. For every 100 females age 18 and over, there were 93.8 males.

The median income for a household in the city was $80,227, and the median income for a family was $82,926. Males had a median income of $61,745 versus $35,082 for females. The per capita income for the city was $37,275. About 1.3% of families and 1.2% of the population were below the poverty line, including 2.1% of those under age 18 and none of those age 65 or over.

Students attend Fort Mill schools, which are located nearby and are considered among the best in the state.

== Parks and recreation ==
Recreational facilities located in Tega Cay include a public 27-hole golf course, a croquet court, and tennis courts, pickleball courts, walking trails, and thirteen city owned parks of which three have baseball and/or soccer fields available for public use. Two of the parks are lake side and the city owns a swimming pool. There is a marina and boats launches.

== Government ==
Tega Cay is run under a council–manager government framework. The city manager is chief executive position in this form of Government. The council of Tega Cay is composed of four members plus the mayor who serves as a member of council, selected from at-large districts. The city maintains its own police department, fire department, parks and recreation department, development services department, utilities department (water and waste water) and public works department.

The mayor is Carmen Miller, who was sworn on January 6, 2026.

Tega Cay is represented by the following legislators:

- US Senate: Senior Senator Darline Graham (R) and Junior Senator Tim Scott (R)
- US House: Ralph Norman (R), as part of South Carolina's 5th congressional district
- South Carolina Senate: Michael Johnson (R) as part of South Carolina Senate District 16
- South Carolina House of Representatives: Jackie Terribile (R) as part of South Carolina House District 66

== Media ==
The newspaper The Tega Cay Sun is printed monthly. Magazines include Life in the Cay and 29708.

== Notable people ==
- Jim Bakker - American evangelist, co-founder and host of The PTL Club
- Ed Currie – breeder of the world's hottest pepper, the Carolina Reaper
- Tamara Faye Messner - American evangelist, co-founder of The PTL Club with her husband Jim Bakker

== See also ==
- Lake Wylie, South Carolina
- Fort Mill, South Carolina
- South Carolina
