= List of shipwrecks in October 1881 =

The list of shipwrecks in October 1881 includes ships sunk, foundered, grounded, or otherwise lost during October 1881.

== 1 October ==
List of shipwrecks: 1 October 1881
Ship	State	Description
Africa	United Kingdom	The ship ran aground on the Sacrifice Rock, off "Ticolly", India. Her passengers were taken off. She was refloated on 11 October.

== 2 October ==
List of shipwrecks: 2 October 1881
Ship	State	Description
Ida	Sweden	The brig was driven ashore at Ekenäs.
Matthew Curtis	United Kingdom	The steamship was driven ashore 4 nautical miles (7.4 km) south of "Jered Hafun", Majerteen Sultanate. Her 27 crew were attacked by the local inhabitants. They took to the boats, and were rescued by a British steamship. Matthew Curtis was on a voyage from Calcutta, India to Dundee, Forfarshire.

== 3 October ==
List of shipwrecks: 3 October 1881
Ship	State	Description
Eeres	Denmark	The steamship was driven ashore at "Revalstone", Russia. She was on a voyage from Amsterdam, North Holland, Netherlands to Reval, and Saint Petersburg, Russia.
George IV	United Kingdom	The ship depatred from the River Tyne for Poole, Dorset. No further trace, reported overdue.

== 4 October ==
List of shipwrecks: 4 October 1881
Ship	State	Description
Morning Star	United Kingdom	The ship ran aground at Queenborough, Kent. She was on a voyage from London to Emmerich am Rhein, Germany.
Sagunto	Spain	The brigantine was driven ashore at Dénia, Spain.

== 5 October ==
List of shipwrecks: 5 October 1881
Ship	State	Description
Hallamshire	United Kingdom	The ship ran aground in the Suez Canal.
Koning der Nederlanden	Netherlands	The Sinking of SS Koning der Nederlanden, oil painting by J. Eden, 1881 After her drive shaft broke the previous day, the ocean liner sank in the Indian Ocean 400 nautical miles (740 km) off the Chagos Archipelago. Six lifeboats were launched; three were found and their occupants rescued, but the other three, with 90 passengers and crew aboard them, disappeared without trace. The captain and thirty-eight crew and passengers were landed at Aden, Aden Colony on 13 November by Madeira (Flag unknown). The steamship Wyberton (United Kingdom) rescued 38 survivors. The steamship Delcomyn (United Kingdom) rescued nineteen survivors.
Lesreaulx	France	The steamship ran aground at Cardiff, Glamorgan, United Kingdom and was damaged. She was refloated and drydocked.
Lucie M.	United States	The schooner sprang a leak and sank 50 nautical miles (93 km) north west of Key West, Florida.
Skjold	United Kingdom	The ship departed from Nantes, Loire-Inférieure, France for Copenhagen, Denmark. Presumed subsequently foundered; items from the ship were discovered at sea before 17 October.
Thomas Lancaster	United States	The schooner was wrecked near Cape Hatteras, North Carolina with the loss of seven lives.
Six unnamed vessels	United States	The ships were wrecked on the coast of the Carolinas.

== 6 October ==
List of shipwrecks: 6 October 1881
Ship	State	Description
Libertas	Norway	The brig collided with the barque Hertha (Germany) off the Varne Lightvessel ( Trinity House) and was severely damaged. She was towed in to Dover, Kent, United Kingdom in a waterlogged condition by Sylphide (Norway).
Margaret Ann	United Kingdom	The smack was run down and sunk off Ringsend, County Dublin by the steamship Edith (United Kingdom). Her crew survived.
Pauline Collins	United States	The schooner was wrecked on Kodiak Island, Department of Alaska. All ten people on board survived.
Tell	Norway	The brig sprang a leak in the Mediterranean Sea and was abandoned. Her crew were rescued. She was on a voyage from Almería, Spain to Arendal.

== 8 October ==
List of shipwrecks: 8 October 1881
Ship	State	Description
Rance	United Kingdom	The steamship was driven ashore in Bideford Bay. The Appledore Lifeboat took off five of the seventeen people on board. She was on a voyage from Torquay, Devon to Newport, Monmouthshire.
Sara	Norway	The ship departed from Belize City, British Honduras for the English Channel. No further trace, reported missing.

== 9 October ==
List of shipwrecks: 9 October 1881
Ship	State	Description
Emily	United Kingdom	The ship collided with Concord (United Kingdom) at Runcorn, Cheshire and was severely damaged.
Silkstone	United Kingdom	The steamship ran aground in the River Suir. She was on a voyage from Waterford to Boulogne, Pas-de-Calais, France.

== 10 October ==
List of shipwrecks: 10 October 1881
Ship	State	Description
Charles Stuart	United Kingdom	The ship departed from Sunderland, County Durham for Newhaven, Sussex. No further trace, reported overdue.
Lurline	United Kingdom	The brigantine was abandoned in the North Sea. She was driven ashore and wrecked at Blakeney, Norfolk.
Rikstina	Russia	The ship departed from Fortrose, Ross-shire for London, United Kingdom. No further trace, reported overdue.

== 11 October ==
List of shipwrecks: 11 October 1881
Ship	State	Description
Corsica	United Kingdom	The steamship struck a sunken rock and foundered 3/4 nautical mile (1.4 km) off Cabo da Roca, Portugal with the loss of 21 of her 26 crew. Survivors reached land in a lifeboat. She was on a voyage from London to Bombay, India.
Gitana	United Kingdom	The steamship was beached on the Abertay Sands in a sinking condition with assistance from the tug William Fenwick (United Kingdom).
Lady Clarendon	United Kingdom	The full-rigged ship ran aground at Cardiff, Glamorgan. She was on a voyage from Quebec City, Canada to Cardiff.

== 12 October ==
List of shipwrecks: 12 October 1881
Ship	State	Description
Emil	Norway	The ship departed from Plymouth, Devon, United Kingdom for Egersund. No further trace, reported missing.
Pasha	United Kingdom	The steamship sank off the Norwegian coast. Her crew were rescued. She was on a voyage from Burntisland, Fife to Kronstadt, Russia. Her captain was reprimanded for having an unfit ship and the crew were drunk because they felt that ″... as the vessel did not look very well, and they thought they might as well go down with a bellyful of whisky as a bellyful of water.″
Sandringham	United Kingdom	The ship ran aground at Greenock, Renfrewshire. She was on a voyage from Quebec City, Canada to Greenock.
Unnamed	Flag unknown	The schooner sank off Formby, Lancashire, United Kingdom with the loss of all hands.

== 13 October ==
List of shipwrecks: 13 October 1881
Ship	State	Description
Agnes Oswald	United Kingdom	The ship was driven ashore at Falmouth, Cornwall.
Alexandra	Sweden	The steamship departed from South Shields, County Durham, United Kingdom for Malmö. No further trace, reported overdue.
Cyfartha	United Kingdom	The steamship ran aground at Bilbao, Spain. She was on a voyage from Bilbao to Cardiff, Glamorgan. She was later refloated and resumed her voyage.
Edmond	France	The steamship ran aground near Bilbao.
Edward O'Brien	United States	The ship was driven ashore at Falmouth.
Gorilla, Iona, and Summerlee	United Kingdom	The steamship Summerlee and the paddle steamer Iona collided in the Clyde near Partick, Renfrewshire and were damaged. The steamship Gorilla ran aground trying to pass Iona, but was refloated. Iona was towed in to Glasgow, Renfrewshire.
Jessie	United Kingdom	The ship departed from Grangemouth, Stirlingshire for Copenhagen, Denmark. No further trace, reported overdue.
Julie	Norway	The brig collided with another vessel and was severely damaged. She was towed in to Havre de Grâce, Seine-Inférieure, France.
Mary A. Kersten	United Kingdom	The brig ran aground at Dunkirk, Nord, France. She was on a voyage from Saint John, New Brunswick, Canada to Dunkirk
Nile	United Kingdom	The steamship departed from South Shields for Kronstadt, Russia. No further trace, reported overdue.
Sydney Grace	United Kingdom	The ship departed from the River Tyne for Dublin. No further trace, reported overdue.

== 14 October ==
List of shipwrecks: 14 October 1881
Ship	State	Description
Ada Maria	United Kingdom	The ship was driven ashore at the mouth of the River Avon with the loss of a crew member. She was on a voyage from Portishead, Somerset to Gloucester.
Admiral	United Kingdom	The ship foundered in the North Sea. She was on a voyage from Peterhead, Aberdeenshire to Leith, Lothian.
Adriatic	Norway	The barque put in to Cowes, Isle of Wight, United Kingdom in a waterlogged condition. She was on a voyage from Oulu, Grand Duchy of Finland to Plymouth, Devon, United Kingdom. She departed from Cowes for Plymouth under tow of the tug Admiral (United Kingdom) on 27 October.
Adolfine	Russia	The barque collided with the full-rigged ship Plenio (Italy) and sank off the Monkstone Lighthouse, Glamorgan, United Kingdom. Her crew were rescued. Adolfine was on a voyage from Gloucester to Riga.
Alexandra	United Kingdom	The ship departed from Newcastle upon Tyne, Northumberland for Malmö, Sweden. No further trace, presumed foundered with the loss of all 25 people on board.
Alice	United Kingdom	The fishing boat sank off Dunbar, Lothian with the loss of all seven crew.
Amelia	United Kingdom	The fishing trawler foundered in the North Sea with the loss of all hands.
Anna Maria	United Kingdom	The fishing trawler was driven ashore and wrecked at Skerries, County Dublin. Her crew were rescued.
Anna Pidzomo	Italy	The barque foundered in the North Sea off the coast of Lincolnshire, United Kingdom. She was on a voyage from Pensacola, Florida, United States to Grimsby, Lincolnshire.
Assyria	United Kingdom	The steamship was driven ashore at Greenock, Renfrewshire. She was refloated.
Atlantic	United Kingdom	The schooner was driven ashore and wrecked at South Shields, County Durham. Her crew were rescued. She was on a voyage from "Lurvic" to South Shields.
Ayton	United Kingdom	The steamship foundered in the North Sea 100 nautical miles (190 km) west by south half south of Spurn Point, Yorkshire. Her twenty crew were rescued by the steamship Romeo (United Kingdom). Ayton was on a voyage from Sunderland, County Durham to Kronstadt, Russia.
Bertha	United Kingdom	The steamship foundered with the loss of all hands.
Bertha	United Kingdom	The fishing trawler was driven ashore at Milford Haven, Pembrokeshire. She was refloated.
Black Cat	United Kingdom	The smack was abandoned off the coast of Devon. Both crew were rescued by the Torquay Lifeboat Mary Brundret ( Royal National Lifeboat Institution), which towed Black Cat in to Torquay.
Bravo	Norway	The steamship was lost off the coast of Iceland with the loss of nine of the twelve people on board.
Brenton	United Kingdom	The schooner was abandoned in Cardigan Bay. Her crew were rescued by the Portmadoc Lifeboat.
Clyde	United Kingdom	The dredger sank at Swansea, Glamorgan.
Comet	United Kingdom	The brigantine was driven ashore at Popton Point, Pembrokeshire. Her crew were rescued. She was a total loss.
Comet	United Kingdom	The fishing trawler foundered in the North Sea with the loss of all hands.
Cyprian	United Kingdom	The steamship was driven ashore and wrecked at Nefyn, Caernarfonshire with the loss of twenty of the 28 people on board. She was on a voyage from Liverpool to a Mediterranean port.
Dewi Wyn	United Kingdom	The ship was driven ashore and severely damaged at Milford Haven.
Dorothea	Norway	The barque was abandoned in the North Sea off Whitby, Yorkshire. Her crew were rescued by the fishing smack Prosperity(United Kingdom). Dorothea was on a voyage from Grangemouth, Stirlingshire, United Kingdom to Copenhagen, Denmark.
Eblana	United Kingdom	The fishing trawler was driven ashore at Skerries. Her crew were rescued.
Economist	United Kingdom	The hulk sank at Milford Haven.
Ellen	United Kingdom	The ship sank at Milford Haven.
Eliza	United Kingdom	The fishing trawler foundered in the North Sea with the loss of all hands.
Eliza Frances	United Kingdom	The ship was driven ashore at Aberporth, Cardiganshire.
Elsa	Flag unknown	The schooner was driven ashore at Leith. She was on a voyage from "Morrisonhaven" to Bremerhaven, Germany. She was refloated with the assistance of a tug.
Emma Mary	United Kingdom	The barque foundered off Great Yarmouth, Norfolk. Her crew were rescued by St Bernard (Flag unknown).
Emily	United Kingdom	The smack was driven ashore at Milford Haven.
Emmie	United Kingdom	The schooner was driven ashore at Thisted, Denmark. She was refloated on 10 April 1882 and taken in to the Limfjord.
Equestrian	United Kingdom	The schooner was driven ashore at Port Gordon, Moray. Her four crew were rescued by the Buckie Lifeboat.
Evergreen	United Kingdom	The sloop foundered off Spurn Point. Her crew were rescued by the tug Champion (United Kingdom). She was on a voyage from Hull, Yorkshire to Ipswich, Suffolk.
Express	United Kingdom	The ship was riven ashore and wrecked on Inchgarvie, Lothian. Her crew were rescued. She was on a voyage from Alloa, Clackmannanshire to the "Leven Light".
Fanny Carvill	Canada	The barque was driven ashore and wrecked in Bluemull Sound. Her crew were rescued. She was on a voyage from Hull to Troon, Ayrshire, United Kingdom.
Favorite	France	The schooner ran aground on the Doom Bar. Her three crew were rescued by the Padstow Lifeboat Albert Edward ( Royal National Lifeboat Institution).
Febo	Italy	The barque was abandoned in the Bristol Channel. Her fourteen crew were rescued by the Penarth Lifeboat.
Florence	United Kingdom	The fishing trawler foundered in the North Sea with the loss of all hands.
Fremad	Norway	The schooner was abandoned 2 nautical miles (3.7 km) off the Isle of May, Fife, United Kingdom. Her crew were rescued by Iron King (United Kingdom). Fremad was on a voyage from "Portend" to Leith. She was discovered off Coquet Island, Northumberland, United Kingdom by the steamship Marmion (United Kingdom), which towed her in to Leith.
Frolic	United Kingdom	The fishing smack was driven ashore at Paull, Yorkshire.
Ganges	United Kingdom	The ship was wrecked on the Goodwin Sands, Kent with the loss of four of her 36 crew. Fifteen survivors were rescued by the Ramsgate Lifeboat Bradford and seventeen by the Deal Lifeboat Mary Somerville (both Royal National Lifeboat Institution) and by Vulcan (United Kingdom). Ganges was on a voyage from Middlesbrough, Yorkshire to Calcutta, India.
Goldseeker	United Kingdom	The fishing trawler foundered in the North Sea with the loss of all hands.
Harmony	United Kingdom	The barque was driven into William Hartmann (Flag unknown) and then drove ashore east of Dunkirk, Nord, France.
Hercules	United Kingdom	The smack foundered in the North Sea. Her crew were rescued by the steam cutter Europe (United Kingdom).
Ino	United Kingdom	The Hartlepool-registered ship foundered off the coast of Yorkshire.
Ino	United Kingdom	The Seaham-registered ship foundered off the coast of Yorkshire.
James and Mary	United Kingdom	The schooner was driven ashore in the Garston Channel. Her crew survived.
Jamie	United Kingdom	The schooner was driven ashore at Shanklin, Isle of Wight.
Jane	United Kingdom	The schooner was driven ashore and wrecked 1 1/2 nautical miles (2.8 km) from Dunbar with the loss of all hands.
Jane and Hannah	United Kingdom	The steam wherry foundered in the North Sea 2 nautical miles (3.7 km) off Blyth, Northumberland.
Jessie Brown	United Kingdom	The steamship collided with the steamship Liverpool (United Kingdom) and sank in the Crosby Channel. Her crew were rescued by Liverpool.
Judy	United Kingdom	The smack was driven ashore and severely damaged at Milford Haven.
Juliesache	Norway	The schooner ran aground on the Goodwin Sands and was wrecked with the presumed loss of all hands. She floated off, and was discovered the next day 4 nautical miles (7.4 km) south west of the South Sandshead Lightship ( Trinity House) by the tug Palmerston (United Kingdom), which towed her in to Dover, Kent in a waterlogged condition.
Laura Fell	United Kingdom	The steamship was abandoned in the Bristol Channel. Seven people were rescued by the Pembrey Lifeboat. Laura Fell was on a voyage from Newport, Monmouthshire to Cork. She was towed in to Llanelly, Glamorgan.
Margaret	United Kingdom	The ship was driven ashore in Bangor Bay. Her fifteen crew were rescued by the Groomsport Lifeboat.
Maria	United Kingdom	The brig was driven ashore and wrecked at Covehithe Ness, Suffolk. Her crew were rescued by the Kessingland and Pakefield RNLI lifeboats. She was on a voyage from Hartlepool, County Durham to London.
Mary	United Kingdom	The ship was driven ashore at Aldeburgh, Suffolk. Her crew were rescued. She was on a voyage from Newcastle upon Tyne to Sheerness Dockyard, Kent. She floated off and sank.
Mary	United Kingdom	The schooner was driven ashore on Salt Island, Anglesey. Her crew were rescued.
Mary	United Kingdom	The fishing trawler foundered in the North Sea with the loss of all hands.
Nantglyn	United Kingdom	The ship departed from the River Tyne for Poole, Dorset. No further trace, reported overdue.
Napoleon	United Kingdom	The tug foundered off the North Foreland, Kent with the loss of all nine crew. She was going to the assistance of Allenshaw, which was in distress 9 or 10 nautical miles (17 or 19 km) off the North Foreland.
Neath Trader	United Kingdom	The smack was driven ashore and wrecked on the coast of Somerset. Her crew were rescued by the Burnham Lifeboat.
Neilson Taylor	United Kingdom	The steamship was driven ashore and wrecked near Lindisfarne, Northumberland. Her crew were rescued. She was on a voyage from Amble, Northumberland to Dundee, Forfarshire.
Noordster	Netherlands	The fishing boat was abandoned in the North Sea before 18 October. Her crew were rescued.
Northumberland	United Kingdom	The steamship was lost. Her crew were rescued by the Newbiggin Lifeboat.
Olga Elkan	Germany	The ship ran aground at Heligoland. She was later refloated and towed in to the Elbe.
Pelican	United Kingdom	The steamship was driven ashore and severely damaged at Drummore, Wigtownshire.
Pickwick	United Kingdom	The schooner was driven ashore in Holyhead Bay. She was on a voyage from Dundalk, County Louth to Bridgwater, Somerset. Her four crew were rescued by the Holyhead Lifeboat.
Pilot	United Kingdom	The steamship was driven ashore and wrecked at the mouth of the River Ogmore. Her crew were rescued. She was on a voyage from Portreath, Cornwall to Cardiff, Glamorgan.
Queen Emma	United Kingdom	The Thames barge sank on the Kentish Flats, off the north Kent coast.
Queen of Scots	United Kingdom	The ship was driven ashore at Liverpool. She was refloated.
Queen of the Sea	United Kingdom	The schooner was driven ashore on the coast of Glamorgan.
Ravenspur	United Kingdom	The steamship was driven ashore at Maassluis, South Holland, Netherlands. She was on a voyage from Rotterdam, South Holland to Newcastle upon Tyne.
Rectory Belle	United Kingdom	The fishing trawler was driven ashore and wrecked at Skerries. Her crew were rescued.
Rose	United Kingdom	The schooner was driven ashore on Salt Island, Anglesey. She was refloated on 22 November and towed in to Holyhead, Anglesey.
Sampson	United Kingdom	The tug was wrecked at the mouth of the River Wear with the loss of all four crew.
Saxon	United Kingdom	The schooner was driven ashore in Holyhead Bay. Her four crew were rescued by the Holyhead Lifeboat.
Seapoint	United Kingdom	The schooner was driven ashore in the Garston Channel. Her crew were rescued.
Serjeant Ballantine	United Kingdom	The fishing trawler foundered in the North Sea with the loss of all hands.
Snowdonia	United Kingdom	The barque foundered in the North Sea off North Sunderland, Northumberland with the loss of all hands. She was on a voyage from the Bull River to Berwick upon Tweed, Northumberland.
Sophia	United Kingdom	The smack was driven ashore at Milford Haven. She was declared a total loss.
Speedwell	United Kingdom	The ship sank at Milford Haven.
Spekulation	Norway	The barque was driven ashore at Ambelteuse, Pas-de-Calais, France. Her crew were rescued. She was on a voyage from Grimstad to Cardiff.
Sunflower	United Kingdom	The ship foundered in the North Sea. Her crew survived.
Susan	United Kingdom	The brig was driven ashore and wrecked at Emmanuel Head near Lindisfarne. Her crew of ten were rescued. She was on a voyage from Montrose, Forfarshire to Sunderland in ballast.
Tal-y-fan	United Kingdom	The steam flat was driven ashore at Porthdinllaen, Caernarfonshire. Her four crew were rescued by the Porthdinllaen Lifeboat George Moore ( Royal National Lifeboat Institution).
Topaz	United Kingdom	The smack was driven ashore and severely damaged at Milford Haven.
Ulala	United Kingdom	The schooner was abandoned in the Irish Sea. Her four crew were rescued by the Ramsey Lifeboat.
Una	United Kingdom	The brig sprang a leak and was abandoned in the North Sea off the coast of Norfolk. Her six crew were rescued by the fishing lugger Hinch (France). Una was on a voyage from London to Whitby. She was subsequently discovered by a fishing smack, which towed her in to Ostend, West Flanders, Belgium.
Unione	Italy	The barque sank in the North Sea 8 nautical miles (15 km) off the Leman Sandbank. Eight of her twelve crew were rescued by the smack Seaflower (United Kingdom) and the other four were rescued by the smack Challeneger (United Kingdom).
Victoria	United Kingdom	The smack foundered in the Bristol Channel off the coast of Somerset. Her crew were rescued. She was on a voyage from Lydney, Gloucestershire to Ilfracombe, Devon.
Vintage	United Kingdom	The brigantine was driven into the St. Nicholas Lightship ( Trinity House) and then ran aground on the Scroby Sands, Norfolk. A crew member got aboard the lightship; he opined that Vintage must have foundered with the loss of the rest of the crew.
William	United Kingdom	The schooner was driven ashore at Skerries. Her crew were rescued by the Skerries Lifeboat and a shoreboat. She was on a voyage from Cardiff to Ardrossan, Ayrshire.
Ramsey Lifeboat	United Kingdom	The lifeboat was severely damaged rescuing the crew of the schooner Ulala (United Kingdom). She was consequently beached.
Unnamed fishing boats	United Kingdom	At least twenty fishing boats were lost in the North Sea, off Eyemouth, Berwickshire during a gale. All told 189 men lost their lives.
Six unnamed vessels	Flags unknown	The ships were lost within a few miles of Liverpool.
Five unnamed vessels	Flags unknown	The ships were driven ashore at Burnham-on-Sea, Somerset.
Unnamed	United Kingdom	The trow was abandoned on the Bristol Channel with the loss of one of her four crew. Survivors were rescued by a steamship. She was then driven ashore at Avonmouth, Somerset.
Unnamed	United Kingdom	The fishing boat foundered off Dunbar with the loss of all seven crew.
Unnamed	United Kingdom	The pilot boat foundered off Newhaven, Lothian with the loss of all three crew.
Three or four unnamed vessels	United Kingdom	The sloops were driven ashore on the Lincolnshire bank of the Humber.
Unnamed	Austria-Hungary	The brig was driven ashore at Neath, Glamorgan.
Unnamed vessels	Flags unknown	A number of vessels were driven ashore on the coast of Glamorgan.
Five unnamed vessels	Flags unknown	The ships were driven ashore at the mouth of the River Avon and in the River Severn.
Unnamed	United Kingdom	The fishing boat was driven ashore at Spittal, Northumberland. Her six crew were rescued by the Berwick Lifeboat.
Unnamed	United Kingdom	The fishing boat was driven ashore at Hood's Head, Northumberland. Her six crew were rescued by rocket apparatus.
Unnamed	United Kingdom	The steamship was driven ashore and wrecked at Burnmouth, Berwickshire.
Unnamed	Flag unknown	The sloop sank 2 nautical miles (3.7 km) north of the Hunstanton Lighthouse, Norfolk.
Unnamed	United Kingdom	The schooner was driven ashore and wreaked at Withernsea, Yorkshire with the loss of all hands.
Unnamed	United Kingdom	The Yorkshire Billyboy was driven ashore at Kilnsea, Yorkshire.
Unnamed	Flag unknown	The barque was abandoned in the North Sea. Her fifteen crew were rescued by the smack Amphitrite (United Kingdom).
Unnamed	Flag unknown	The ship was abandoned in the Thames Estuary. Her four crew were rescued by the Southend Lifeboat Boys of England ( Royal National Lifeboat Institution).
Unnamed	United Kingdom	The ketch was abandoned off the coast of Norfolk. Her four crew were rescued by the Winterton Lifeboat.
Unnamed	United Kingdom	The fishing boat was abandoned off the coast of Anglesey. Her four crew were rescued by the Moelfre Lifeboat Lady Vivian ( Royal National Lifeboat Institution).

== 15 October ==
List of shipwrecks: 15 October 1881
Ship	State	Description
Agostino	Spain	The barque ran aground on the Kaloot Sand, off the coast of Zeeland, Netherlands.
Avenir	France	The schooner ran aground on the Kaloot Sand.
Gwillinge	Germany	The brig foundered in the North Sea with the loss of all but her captain. He was rescued by the schooner Cito (Denmark).
Industry	United Kingdom	The sloop was driven ashore and wrecked at Brancaster, Norfolk.
Julie Esche	Germany	The ship was discovered in a waterlogged condition 4 nautical miles (7.4 km) off the East Goodwin Lightship ( Trinity House). She was taken in to Dover, Kent, United Kingdom.
Rose Middleton	United Kingdom	The steamship was driven ashore at Redheugh, County Durham. She was refloated on 21 January 1882 and towed in to Leith, Lothian by four tugs. She was placed under repair.
Seven Sisters	United Kingdom	The ship foundered in the North Sea 45 nautical miles (83 km) south east of Flamborough Head, Yorkshire. Her crew took to a boat; they were rescued by Elizabeth Roy (United Kingdom). Seven Sisters was on a voyage from Newcastle upon Tyne, Northumberland to Queenstown, County Cork.
Skimmer of the Sea	United Kingdom	The ship foundered in the North Sea with the loss of all hands.
Sleipner	Norway	The ship was driven ashore at Saltfleet, Lincolnshire, United Kingdom and was abandoned by her crew.
Usworth	United Kingdom	The steamship departed from the River Tyne for Hamburg, Germany. No further trace, presumed foundered with the loss of all fifteen crew.

== 16 October ==
List of shipwrecks: 16 October 1881
Ship	State	Description
Aristides	United Kingdom	The steamship was driven ashore and wrecked at "Cape Engheta", 15 nautical miles (28 km) west of Bizerte, Tunisia. Her crew were rescued by Bittern (United Kingdom). Aristides was on a voyage from Odesa, Russia to Liverpool, Lancashire
Catherine Anne	United Kingdom	The schooner sprang a leak and foundered in the English Channel 50 nautical miles (93 km) west of Plymouth, Devon. Her crew survived. She was on a voyage from Porthcawl, Glamorgan to Messina, Sicily, Italy.
Claudia	Germany	The barque foundered in the Dogger Bank. Her crew were rescued by the fishing smack Amphitrite (United Kingdom). Claudia was on a voyage from the River Tyne to Stettin.
Frouwina	Netherlands	The brig was driven ashore at Lemvig, Denmark. She was on a voyage from London or Hull, Yorkshire, United Kingdom to Danzig, Germany. She was a total loss.
John Brotherick	United Kingdom	The abandoned schooner was towed in to Brouwershaven, Zeeland, Netherlands.
Josephine	United Kingdom	The ship ran aground on the Mellum Platte, in the North Sea off the German coast, with the loss of a crew member. She was on a voyage from Grangemouth, Stirlingshire to Bremerhaven, Germany.
J. W. Greaves	United Kingdom	The ship was driven ashore and sank at Imbituba, Brazil.
Petit Arthur	France	The schooner was driven ashore at Lemvig. She was on a voyage from Brest, Fininstère to Danzig.
Samarang	United Kingdom	The barque was abandoned in the North Sea. Her crew were rescued by a smack.
Success	United Kingdom	The brigantine was abandoned in the North Sea. Her crew were rescued by the smack Rover (United Kingdom). Success was on a voyage from Caen, Calvados, France to Sunderland, County Durham. She was towed in to Maassluis, South Holland on 16 October.

== 17 October ==
List of shipwrecks: 17 October 1881
Ship	State	Description
Ellen	United Kingdom	The schooner was driven ashore at the mouth of the Geeste. Her crew were rescued.
Luna	Germany	The brig was driven ashore and wrecked at Thisted, Denmark with the loss of all but three of her crew.
Mary Jane	United Kingdom	The Mersey Flat sank at Liverpool, Lancashire.
Minna Watson	(Canada)	The ship foundered in the Atlantic Ocean (59°10′N 4°45′W) with the loss of all on board, according to a message in a bottle that washed up in the Orkney Islands in late October.
Physician	United Kingdom	The schooner was driven ashore at the mouth of the Geeste. Her crew were rescued.
Wasp	United Kingdom	The steamship departed from Liverpool for Havre de Grâce, Seine-Inférieure, France. No further trace, reported overdue.
Five unnamed vessels	Germany	The ships were driven ashore and wrecked at Bremen with some loss of life.

== 18 October ==
List of shipwrecks: 18 October 1881
Ship	State	Description
Ajmeer	United Kingdom	The ship was damaged by fire at Port Glasgow, Renfrewshire.
Balclutha	New South Wales	The steamship foundered off Gabo Island, Victoria with the loss of all 22 crew. She was on a voyage from Melbourne, Victoria to Sydney.
Bessie Jane	United Kingdom	The ship sank in the Bristol Channel. Her crew were rescued. She was on a voyage from Newport, Monmouthshire to Padstow, Cornwall.
Fenco	Austria-Hungary	The barque ran aground near New Romney, Kent, United Kingdom. She was on a voyage from Antwerp, Belgium to Cardiff, Glamorgan, United Kingdom. She was refloated the next day with assistance from the tug Suffolk (United Kingdom).

== 19 October ==
List of shipwrecks: 19 October 1881
Ship	State	Description
Alexandre II	Portugal	The ship was abandoned in the Atlantic Ocean. Her crew were rescued by a British steamship. She was on a voyage from St. Ubes to Porto.
Cornubia	United Kingdom	The schooner was driven ashore and sank east of Roche's Point, County Cork with the loss of all seven crew. She was on a voyage from Newport, Monmouthshire to Cork.
Euphemia	Austria-Hungary	The brig ran aground in Hall Bay. She put in to Waterford, United Kingdom in a leaky condition.
Heinrich and Emil	Germany	The derelict brig was driven ashore near "Kernsea". She was on a voyage from the River Tyne to Stettin.
Idonico	Austria-Hungary	The barque was driven ashore in Rocky Bay, County Cork with the loss of all but two of the eleven people on board. She was on a voyage from Liverpool, Lancashire, United Kingdom to Baltimore, Maryland, United States.
Isabel	Netherlands	The schooner ran aground in the Ozama River and sank.
Quinta	Germany	The steamship was driven ashore at Taizhou, China and caught fire. She was on a voyage from Saigon, French Indo-China to Hong Kong.
Sarah Allan	United Kingdom	The ship was driven ashore on the coast of County Cork. She was refloated.
Silistria	United Kingdom	The ship was abandoned in the Atlantic Ocean. Her crew were rescued by the barque Melbourne (Flag unknown). Silistria was on a voyage from Quebec City, Canada to Plymouth, Devon.

== 20 October ==
List of shipwrecks: 20 October 1881
Ship	State	Description
Abra	United Kingdom	The ketch was abandoned in the Atlantic Ocean (51°15′N 5°47′W with the loss of her captain. Two survivors were rescued by the steamship Pacific (United Kingdom).
Bend Or	United Kingdom	The barque foundered in the Atlantic Ocean. Five men from the barque Lowood ( Canada) died when attempting to save the crew of Bend Or, which was on a voyage from Liverpool, Lancashire to Saint John's, Newfoundland Colony. Lowood rescued half of Bend Or's crew. The rest were rescued on 22 October by the barque Rudolph (Germany).
Freeman Dennis	Canada	The ship foundered in the Atlantic Ocean.
Golden Sea	United Kingdom	The barque sank in the Atlantic Ocean. Her crew were rescued by the steamship Nubia (United Kingdom). Golden Sea was on a voyage from Bristol, Gloucestershire to Saint John, New Brunswick, Canada.
Haknas	Sweden	The barque was abandoned in the Atlantic Ocean with the loss of four of her fourteen crew. Survivors were rescued by the steamship State of Pennsylvania (United Kingdom). Haknas was on a voyage from Malmö to New York, United States.
Harriet R.	United Kingdom	The brigantine was driven ashore and wrecked at Saundersfoot, Pembrokeshire. Her crew survived. She was on a voyage from Plymouth, Devon to Llanelly, Glamorgan.
Iron King, Lebu, and Two Sisters	United Kingdom; United Kingdom; Royal National Lifeboat Institution	The tug Iron King sprang a severe leak and sank 6 nautical miles (11 km) off Douglas Head, Isle of Man. The barque Lebu anchored, and subsequently raised a distress flag. Her crew were taken off by the Douglas Lifeboat Two Sisters, which capsized on its return with the loss of four of her crew and eight survivors from Lebu. Iron King was towing Lebu from Maryport, Cumberland to Cardiff, Glamorgan.
Samson	Norway	The barque was driven ashore at Cabo de Gata, Spain.

== 21 October ==
List of shipwrecks: 21 October 1881
Ship	State	Description
Balclutha	Flag unknown	The steamship foundered with the loss of all seventeen people on board. She was on a voyage from Melbourne, Victoria to Sydney, New South Wales.
Conrad	United Kingdom	The brig was run into by the full-rigged ship Breadalbane (United Kingdom) and sank off the coast of Cornwall. Conrad was on a voyage from Cardiff, Glamorgan to Stockholm, Sweden.
Busy Bee	United Kingdom	The brig was abandoned in the Atlantic Ocean. Her crew were rescued by the steamship Kestrel (United Kingdom). Busy Bee was on a voyage from Newry, County Antrim to Economy, Nova Scotia, Canada.
Clan Macduff	United Kingdom	The steamship left Liverpool, Lancashire for Bombay, British Raj on 18 October and foundered in the Atlantic Ocean three days later. Some of the crew and passengers took to the boats the day before she sank, and ten people were picked up by the steamship Palestine (United Kingdom). There were not enough lifeboats and nineteen people left on board Clan Macduff were rescued by Upupa (United Kingdom).
Iron Crown	United Kingdom	The barque was driven ashore and wrecked at Tynemouth, Northumberland. She was on a voyage from Hamburg, Germany to the River Tyne.
Maria	Sweden	The schooner was driven ashore and wrecked at Sea Palling, Norfolk, United Kingdom. Her crew were rescued by rocket apparatus and the Palling Lifeboat. She was on a voyage from Harrestad to Trouville, Manche, France.
Omba	Flag unknown	The barque foundered off Lake Macquarie Heads, New South Wales. She was on a voyage from Batavia, Netherlands East Indies to Melbourne.
Pengersick Castle	United Kingdom	The ship sank in the River Usk. She was on a voyage from Appledore, Devon to Newport, Monmouthshire.

== 22 October ==
List of shipwrecks: 22 October 1881
Ship	State	Description
Amsterdam Packet	Norway	The brig was abandoned in the North Sea. Her crew were rescued by the steamship Osbourne (United Kingdom). Amsterdam Packet was on a voyage from Amsterdam, North Holland, Netherlands to Christiania.
Bertha	United Kingdom	The schooner was driven ashore and scuttled in Lough Swilly. She was on a voyage from Liverpool, Lancashire to Sligo.
Calliope	United Kingdom	The steamship sank off Cape Corubedo, Spain with the loss of all but one of her crew. She was on a voyage from Odesa, Russia to Bremen, Germany.
Christiania, and Olivia	Norway	The steamship Christiania and the brig Olivia collided and were both severely damaged. They both put in to IJmuiden, North Holland, Netherlands. Christiania was on a voyage from Amsterdam, North Holland to Christiania. Olivia was on a voyage from Fredrikstad to IJmuiden.
Douze Apotres	France	The ship was driven ashore and wrecked at Dungarvan, County Waterford, United Kingdom. She was on a voyage from Vannes, Morbihan to Cardiff, Glamorgan, United Kingdom.
Florence	United Kingdom	The ship was driven ashore and wrecked at Newcastle, County Down. Her five crew were rescued by the Newcastle Lifeboat. She was on a voyage from Cardiff, Glamorgan to Belfast, County Antrim.
Fusi Yama	United Kingdom	The steamship ran aground at Ochakoff, Russia.
Glimpse	Flag unknown	The barque foundered at sea. She was on a voyage from British Columbia, Canada to Melbourne, Victoria.
George H. Oulton	Canada	On 22 October, the ship of Saint John, New Brunswick stranded on the North Bull, off Clontarf, Dublin. Her crew of 16 were rescued by the Howth RNLI lifeboat Clara Baker. On the 31 October, 11 riggers engaged in salvage work were rescued from the same wreck by the Poolbeg and Kingstown RNLI lifeboats.
Main, and Unity	United Kingdom	The Thames barge Unity was run into by the steamship F. T. Barry (United Kingdom) and sunk at Swanscombe, Kent with the loss of a crew member. F. T. Barrt then collided with a schooner and the sloop Main, which was severely damaged and had to be beached.
Maggie Miller	Canada	The barque was abandoned in the Atlantic Ocean. off the Azores. Her crew were rescued by the barque Proto (Austria-Hungary). Maggie Miller was on a voyage from Antwerp, Belgium to Baltimore, Maryland, United States.
Martha	Germany	The full-rigged ship was abandoned in the Atlantic Ocean. Her crew were rescued by the barque Olbers (Germany). Martha was on a voyage from New York, United States to Hamburg.
Mary Ann	United Kingdom	The brig was driven ashore and wrecked 1 nautical mile (1.9 km) north of Malahide, County Dublin. She was on a voyage from Whitehaven, Cumberland to Dublin.
Stewart	United Kingdom	The schooner was driven ashore and wrecked in Cloghy Bay. Her crew survived.
Unnamed	Flag unknown	The ship was driven ashore at Sutton County Dublin.

== 23 October ==
List of shipwrecks: 23 October 1881
Ship	State	Description
Elizabeth	United Kingdom	The brig was driven ashore near Youghal, County Cork with the loss of one of her four crew. She was on a voyage from Newport, Monmouthshire to Cork.
Empire of Peace	United Kingdom	The vessel was driven ashore in Dundalk Bay. Her crew survived. She was on a voyage from Liverpool, Lancashire to New Orleans, Louisiana, United States. She was a total loss.
Ethel	United Kingdom	The yacht was driven ashore and wrecked at Dromore, County Down.
Fire Venner	Norway	The schooner was driven ashore and wrecked at Burntisland, Fife, United Kingdom. Her crew were rescued by a fishing boat. She was on a voyage from Sunderland, County Durham, United Kingdom to Ångelholm, Sweden.
Josephine	Sweden	The brig was abandoned in the North Sea. Her eight crew were rescued by the steamship Gipsy Queen (United Kingdom). Josephine was on a voyage from Ystad to Hartlepool, County Durham.
Lara	United Kingdom	The barque caught fire in the Pacific Ocean and was abandoned. Some of her crew were rescued. She was on a voyage from Hull, Yorkshire to San Francisco, California, United States.
Louisa	Norway	The galiot was driven ashore and wrecked near Crail, Fife, United Kingdom with the loss of four of her six crew. She was on a voyage from Norway to Newcastle upon Tyne, Northumberland, United Kingdom.
Lydia	Norway	The barque was driven onto the Burnham Flats, off the coast of Norfolk, United Kingdom. Ten crew were rescued by a lifeboat. She was on a voyage from Arendal to Cardiff, Glamorgan, United Kingdom.
Madeleine	France	The fishing lugger was wrecked on the Gunfleet Sand, in the North Sea off the coast of Essex, United Kingdom. Her sixteen crew were rescued by the Clacton Lifeboat Albert Edward ( Royal National Lifeboat Institution).
Margaret Milne	Norway	The barque was driven ashore and wrecked at Aberdeen, United Kingdom. Her crew were rescued by the Aberdeen Lifeboat. She was on a voyage from Burntisland, Fife, United Kingdom to Drammen.
Nevada	United Kingdom	The steamship ran aground at Queenstown, County Cork. She was on a voyage from New York to Queenstown. She was refloated with assistance from a number of tugs.
Thomas Alfred	Norway	The brig was wrecked near North Berwick, Lothian, United Kingdom. Her crew survived. She was on a voyage from Dunkirk, Nord, France to Kristiansand.
Verulam	United Kingdom	The barque was abandoned in the Atlantic Ocean. Her crew were rescued by the barque Mozart (Germany). Verulam was on a voyage from Mauritius to London.
Victor	Sweden	The barque was abandoned in the Atlantic Ocean (40°10′N 26°25′W). Her twelve crew were rescued by the steamship Black Sea (United Kingdom). Victor was on a voyage from New York, United States to Stettin, Germany.
Unnamed	United Kingdom	The barge was run down and sunk in the River Thames by the steamship F. T. Barry (United Kingdom).

== 24 October ==
List of shipwrecks: 24 October 1881
Ship	State	Description
Alfred	France	The schooner ran aground on the Hook Sand, in the English Channel off the coast of Dorset, United Kingdom. She was on a voyage from Pont-l'Abbé, Finistère to Dunkirk, Nord. She was refloated with the assistance of a tug and towed in to Poole, Dorset.
Ester	Sweden	The brig was driven ashore and wrecked 1 nautical mile (1.9 km) east of the Heugh Lighthouse, County Durham, United Kingdom. Her eight crew were rescued by the Coastguard using rocket apparatus. She was on a voyage from Ekenäs to Hartlepool, County Durham.
Eskdale	United Kingdom	The steamship ran aground in the Yenikale Channel. She was on a voyage from Palermo, Sicily, Italy to Azov, Russia.
France	France	The ship foundered in the Atlantic Ocean 300 nautical miles (560 km) off Bermuda Her nineteen crew took to three boats. Nine people in one of the boats were rescued on 10 November by the barque Alexandra (Norway). France was on a voyage from Quebec City, Canada to Colón, United States of Colombia.
Josefix	Flag unknown	The brig was wrecked on the Bondicar Rocks, off the coast of Northumberland, United Kingdom.
Preciosa	Norway	The barque was driven ashore "at Bardsey". Her crew were rescued by rocket apparatus. She was on a voyage from Porsgrund to Thurso, Caithness, United Kingdom.
Sagittaire	France	The brigantine was abandoned in the Atlantic Ocean (50°15′N 11°10′W). Her crew were rescued by Vorwarts (Flag unknown). Saggitaire was on a voyage from Cardiff, Glamorgan, United Kingdom to Nantes, Loire-Inférieure.
Victoria	United Kingdom	The schooner was wrecked in Newlyn harbour, Cornwall during a storm.
Unnamed	Flag unknown	The ship was wrecked on the Carr Rock, off the coast of Berwickshire, United Kingdom.

== 25 October ==
List of shipwrecks: 25 October 1881
Ship	State	Description
Charles et Jeane	France	The barque ran aground on the Shipwash Sand, in the North Sea off the coast of Suffolk, United Kingdom. She was refloated the next day and assisted in to Harwich, Essex, United Kingdom by a steamship.
Helene	Norway	The barque was abandoned in the Atlantic Ocean. Her crew were rescued by the barque Olbers (Germany). Helene was on a voyage from Saguenay, Quebec, Canada to London.
Josephina	Ottoman Empire	The barque ran aground at South Shields, County Durham, United Kingdom. She was on a voyage from Hudiksvall, Sweden to Dunkirk, Nord, France. She was towed in to the River Tyne in a waterlogged condition by the steamship Express (United Kingdom).

== 26 October ==
List of shipwrecks: 26 October 1881
Ship	State	Description
Lass of Gowrie	United Kingdom	The paddle tug foundered off St. Anns Head, Pembrokeshire. Her crew were rescued by a ketch.
Mary	United Kingdom	The schooner struck rocks off Land's End, Cornwall and foundered. Her five crew survived. She was on a voyage from Port Talbot, Glamorgan to Looe, Cornwall.
Peter Rolf	Germany	The abandoned ship was discovered in the North Sea and was towed in to Hull, Yorkshire, United Kingdom.

== 27 October ==
List of shipwrecks: 27 October 1881
Ship	State	Description
Chitose Maru	Japan	The steamship was wrecked at "Cape Noshiaf", "Tegu Island". Her crew were rescued.
Dixie	United States	The schooner was stranded on Santa Rosa Island, Florida.
Heureuse Marie	France	The ship was abandoned in the Atlantic Ocean (49°45′N 10°00′W). Her crew were rescued by Allegiance (United Kingdom). Heureuse Marie was on a voyage from "Trehiguer" to Cardiff, Glamorgan, United Kingdom.
Jennie Gilchrist	United States	The steamship suffered engine failure above a government bridge causing her to strike the bridge in the Mississippi River between Rock Island, Illinois and Clinton, Iowa and was wrecked with the loss of nine lives.
Orest	Norway	The brig collided with a steam collier and sank in the River Thames at Cliffe, Kent, United Kingdom.
Sarah Allen	United Kingdom	The ship was driven ashore at Ballycrovane, County Cork and was wrecked.
Unnamed steamer	Flag unknown	The steamship Venetia (Flag unknown) was sailing with another steamship, which disappeared during a sudden squall.

== 28 October ==
List of shipwrecks: 28 October 1881
Ship	State	Description
Athelet	Norway	The barque was destroyed by fire off Lundy Island, Devon, United Kingdom. Her crew were rescued by a pilot boat. She was on a voyage from Cardiff, Glamorgan, United Kingdom to Algoa Bay.
Brunette	(Dominion of Newfoundland) Newfoundland Colony	The ship departed from Lisbon, Portugal for Saint John's. No further trace, reported missing.
Franky	Austria-Hungary	The brig ran aground in the Uruguay River. She was on a voyage from Cardiff to Fray Bentos, Uruguay. She was later refloated.
Queen of the Islaes	United Kingdom	The schooner was driven ashore at Grutness, Shetland Islands. She was refloated and take in to Lerwick.
San Domingo	United Kingdom	The ship was driven ashore at Sestos, Ottoman Empire. She was refloated the next day with the assistance of a number of tugs.
Severn	United Kingdom	The brig collided with the steamship Windsor (United Kingdom) and sank in the River Mersey. Her six crew were rescued by Windsor. Severn was on a voyage from Antwerp, Belgium to Garston, Lancashire.

== 29 October ==
List of shipwrecks: 29 October 1881
Ship	State	Description
Kate Paull	United Kingdom	The schooner was run into by the steamship Fijenoord (Netherlands) and sank in the River Thames at Gravesend, Kent. Her crew survived.
Loch Maree	United Kingdom	The ship departed from Geelong, Victoria for London. No further trace, reported missing.
Longford, and Titania	United Kingdom	The steamships collided in the Irish Sea off Point Lynas, Anglesey and were both severely damaged. Longford was on a voyage from Dublin to Liverpool, Lancashire. She completed her voyage. Titania was on a voyage from Montevideo, Uruguay to Liverpool or vice versa. She put in to Liverpool.
Unnamed	Flag unknown	The barque was driven ashore at Huttoft, Lincolnshire, United Kingdom in a capsized condition.
Unnamed	Flag unknown	The barque was destroyed by fire off Berry Head, Devon, United Kingdom.

== 30 October ==
List of shipwrecks: 30 October 1881
Ship	State	Description
Emilia M.	Italy	The barque foundered off Margate, Kent, United Kingdom. Her crew were rescued. She was on a voyage from London, United Kingdom to Marseille, Bouches-du-Rhône, France.

== 31 October ==
List of shipwrecks: 31 October 1881
Ship	State	Description
Flying Fish	United Kingdom	The ship was driven ashore and wrecked at Lyme Regis, Dorset.
G. Broughton	United Kingdom	The ship was driven ashore in Shoalwater Bay, Oregon. She was on a voyage from Brisbane, Queensland to Portland, Oregon, United States.
George Bell	Canada	The ship was abandoned in the Atlantic Ocean. Her seventeen crew were rescued by Rona (United Kingdom). George Bell was on a voyage from Quebec City to Antwerp, Belgium.
Great Eastern, Laju, and Macedonia	United Kingdom; Puerto Rico; United Kingdom)	The steamship Macedonia collided with the barque Laju and the tug Great Eastern off the Bar Lightship ( Trinity House), in Liverpool Bay and was damaged. Macedonia was on a voyage from Liverpool, Lancashire to Cardiff, Glamorgan. She put back to Liverpool. Laju sank. Her crew were rescued by Macedonia. Laju was on a voyage from Bayamóro to Liverpool. Great Eastern was damaged.
Hanna D.	United Kingdom	The schooner was scuttled at Ballycotton, County Antrim. She was refloated the next day.
Little Henry	United Kingdom	The schooner was driven ashore and wrecked at Seaham, County Durham. She was on a voyage from Blyth, Northumberland to Whitby, Yorkshire.
Sophie	France	The schooner was wrecked at Battery Point, Prussia Cove, Cornwall, United Kingdom with the loss of all hands.
Weatherall	United Kingdom	The steamship ran aground in "Sacoa Bay".

== Unknown date ==
List of shipwrecks: Unknown date in October 1881
Ship	State	Description
Ada, or Ida	Norway	The schooner was driven ashore at Cresswell, Northumberland, United Kingdom with the loss of two of her crew.
Adria	United Kingdom	The ship was driven ashore at Penzance, Cornwall.
Agenoria	United Kingdom	The fishing trawler was driven ashore at Tenby, Pembrokeshire.
Albert Ehrensvaard	Sweden	The barque was driven ashore near "Pasarœang", Netherlands East Indies. She was on a voyage from "Pasarœang" to New York, United States. She was refloated and towed in to Surabaya, Netherland East Indies.
Alert	Norway	The schooner was driven ashore. She was refloated with the assistance of a steamship and towed in to Copenhagen, Denmark.
Alerte	France	The brig was driven ashore and wrecked on Arholma, Sweden.
Alexander	United Kingdom	The schooner ran aground on the Zuidwal, in the Wadden Zee. She was on a voyage from Bangor to Hamburg, Germany.
Alexandre Smyers	Belgium	The steamship foundered off Hanstholm, Denmark before 12 October. Her crew were rescued.
Alice and Ellen	Germany	The brig was driven ashore at Wyk auf Föhr. She was a total loss.
Alice Cooper	United Kingdom	The barque ran aground on the Piel Ridge. She was on a voyage from Barrow-in-Furness, Lancashire to New York.
Alis	Norway	The brig was abandoned in the North Sea. Her crew were rescued. She was on a voyage from Kragerø to London, United Kingdom. She was taken in to Grimsby, Lincolnshire, United Kingdom by a smack.
Allia	United Kingdom	The steamship was driven ashore and severely damaged in the Velsen Fjord.
Alpha	Norway	The barque was abandoned at sea. Her crew survived. She was on a voyage from Luleå, Sweden to Dunkirk, Nord, France.
Alpha	Norway	The brig was abandoned at sea. She was on a voyage from Grimstad to Luleå. She came ashore at Lemvig, Denmark.
Amicitia	Netherlands	The ship was abandoned in the North Sea. She was subsequently towed in to Bremen, Germany in a waterlogged condition.
Anna	Netherlands	The ship was driven ashore on Skagen, Denmark.
Anna Maria	United Kingdom	The fishing smack was driven ashore at Skerries, County Dublin. She was a total loss.
Anne and Jane	United Kingdom	The schooner ran aground in the Pakefield Gat, in the North Sea off the coast of Suffolk. She was on a voyage from Goole, Yorkshire to London. She was refloated and towed in to Lowestoft, Suffolk.
Annie May	United Kingdom	The ship was driven ashore and wrecked on the coast of Puerto Rico. She was on a voyage from Arecibo, Brazil to Boston, Massachusetts, United States.
Antonieta	Spain	The smack sank at Dénia.
Arcturus	Germany	The barque ran aground and was wrecked at "Unst", near Stromness, Orkney Islands, United Kingdom. Her crew were rescued. Shew as on a voyage from Onega, Russia to Liverpool, Lancashire.
Arno	United Kingdom	The steamship was driven ashore in the Yenikale Channel.
August	Germany	The brig was abandoned in the North Sea after 5 October. She was on a voyage from Stettin to Hull, Yorkshire, United Kingdom. She was subsequently wrecked at Thisted, Denmark.
Azoff	Norway	The barque struck rocks in Gorontalo Bay, Netherlands East Indies and was abandoned by her crew. She was on a voyage from Makassar, Netherlands East Indies to Hamburg.
Balclutha	Flag unknown	The steamship foundered during a gale with the loss of all 22 people on board. She was on a voyage from Melbourne, Victoria to Sydney, New South Wales.
Beethoven	Flag unknown	The ship was driven ashore at "Olandshaf". She was on a voyage from Rotterdam, South Holland, Netherlands to Sundsvall, Sweden. She was refloated and taken in to Stockholm, Sweden in a leaky condition.
Belfort	France	The steamship was driven ashore east of Dunkirk. She was on a voyage from Dunkirk to Bilbao, Spain.
Belle	United Kingdom	The fishing smack was driven ashore at Skerries. She was a total loss.
Bertha	Norway	The brig was driven ashore and wrecked at Nexø, Denmark. She was on a voyage from Härnösand, Sweden to Harlingen, Friesland, Netherlands.
Betsey James	United Kingdom	The schooner ran aground on the Ants Sand, in the North Sea. She was on a voyage from Middlesbrough, Yorkshire to Great Yarmouth, Norfolk. She was refloated with assistance and taken in to the Clayhole in a leaky condition.
Bolton Abbey	United Kingdom	The ship was wrecked on Pratas Island, in the East China Sea with the loss of four of her crew. Survivors were rescued by Kestrel (Royal Navy).
Bertha	Norway	The schooner ran aground on the Herd Sand, in the North Sea off the mouth of the River Tyne. Her crew were rescued by a lifeboat. She was on a voyage from Christiania to Blyth, Northumberland, United Kingdom.
Brisbane	United Kingdom	The steamship ran aground.
Britannia	Russia	The barque was driven ashore on Ameland, Friesland, Netherlands. Her crew were rescued. She was on a voyage from Kotka, Grand Duchy of Finland to London.
Caitloch	United Kingdom	The ship caught fire at San Francisco, California, United States.
Calcutta	(Canada)	The barque ran aground at Cardiff, Glamorgan, United Kingdom.
Carolina	United States	The ship was wrecked at Mazatlán, Cuba.
Caroline	Norway	The barque was driven ashore on Öland, Sweden.
Cartolla	Sweden	The schooner was driven ashore at Gothenburg. She was on a voyage from Grimsby to Gothenburg.
Cataluna	Spain	The ship foundered in the Atlantic Ocean. Her crew were rescued. She was on a voyage from Montevideo, Uruguay to Rio de Janeiro, Brazil.
Catharina	Germany	The barque ran aground on the Haisborough Sands, in the North Sea off the coast of Norfolk, United Kingdom and was wrecked with the loss of all hands. She was on a voyage from Hamburg to Shanghai, China.
Chilian	United Kingdom	The ship foundered in the North Sea. Her crew were rescued by the smack Rialto (United Kingdom). Chilian was on a voyage from Sunderland, County Durham to London.
Clara	Sweden	The brig was driven ashore at Nienhagen, Germany.
Cleveland	United Kingdom	The ship was driven ashore at Barrebäck, Sweden.
Cocker	United Kingdom	The schooner was driven ashore near "Dunary", County Louth.
Commerce	Denmark	The schooner foundered in the North Sea. Her crew were rescued. She was on a voyage from Charlestown, Cornwall, United Kingdom to Horsens.
Concurrence	Germany	The steamship was driven ashore and wrecked at Tønning. She was on a voyage from Riga, Russia to Ghent, East Flanders, Belgium.
Cordula, and Tollens	Norway; Netherlands	The barque Cordula collided with the steamship Tollens and sank. Her crew were rescued by Tollens. Cordula was on a voyage from Cherbourg, Manche, France to Härnösand, Sweden. Tollens was on a voyage from Rotterdam to Libava, Courland Governorate. She put in to Copenhagen severely damaged at the bow.
Corean	United Kingdom	The steamship was driven ashore at Point St. Valier, Canada. She was on a voyage from Quebec City, Canada to Glasgow, Renfrewshire. She was later refloated and towed back to Quebec City.
Countess of Durham	United Kingdom	The steamship was abandoned in the North Sea 40 nautical miles (74 km) west north west of Texel, North Holland. Her crew were rescued by the smack Alliance (United Kingdom). She was driven ashore and wrecked in Pegwell Bay between 14 and 18 October.
Crescent City	United States	The steamship capsized in a drydock at New York.
David Badcock	United States	The ship was wrecked on São João Island, Brazil.
Deborah	United Kingdom	The schooner ran aground on the Dragør Sands, in the Baltic Sea. She was on a voyage from Stettin to Antwerp, Belgium.
Derby	United Kingdom	The smack was lost with all hands.
Der Wanderer	Germany	The schooner collided with the barque Frank (Norway) in the Øresund and was severely damaged. Der Wanderer was on a voyage from Hull to Gävle. Sweden. She put in to Copenhagen.
Duen	Norway	The schooner was abandoned in the North Sea. She was subsequently towed in to Terschelling, Friesland.
Duen	Norway	The brig ran aground at Svartklubben, Sweden.
Ebenezer	United States	The brig was abandoned at in the North Sea. Her crew were rescued. She was on a voyage from Wilmington, Delaware to Hamburg. She was towed in to IJmuiden, North Holland, Netherlands.
Elise Metzler	Flag unknown	The ship was driven ashore on Amager, Denmark. She was refloated with assistance and towed in to Copenhagen.
Elizabeth	United Kingdom	The ship sank at Brouwershaven, Zeeland, Netherlands. Her crew survived. She was on a voyage from Newcastle upon Tyne, Northumberland to Rotterdam.
Elizabeth	United Kingdom	The ship was wrecked at Milford Haven, Pembrokeshire with the loss of her captain.
Eliza Cornish	United Kingdom	The ship was driven ashore and wrecked between Saltburn and Skinningrove, Yorkshire. She was on a voyage from Sunderland to London.
Elizabeth Young	(United Kingdom of Great Britain and Ireland) Guernsey	The brig foundered in the North Sea 60 nautical miles (110 km) off Spurn Head with the loss of three of her crew. Survivors were rescued by the smack Peace (United Kingdom). Elizabeth Young was on a voyage from the River Tyne to Jersey, Channel Islands.
Ellard	United Kingdom	The fishing smack was driven ashore at Skerries. She was a total loss.
Emborini	Greece	The brig was wrecked in the Kertch Strait. Her crew took to a lifeboat; they were rescued by the steamship Leverington (United Kingdom).
Emile	France	The steamship was driven ashore at Gravelines, Nord.
Emma and Mary	United Kingdom	The schooner sank in the North Sea south east of Lowestoft. Her crew were rescued.
Emma Pitcairn	United Kingdom	The ship was driven ashore in Bull-creek, Prince Edward Island, Canada. She was on a voyage from Madeira to Prince Edward Island.
England's Glory	United Kingdom	The ship struck a rock and foundered in Bluff Harbour, New Zealand.
Ester	United Kingdom	The brig was driven ashore and wrecked at West Hartlepool, County Durham. Her crew were rescued.
Eta	United Kingdom	The ship arrived at Stanley, Falkland Islands on fire. She was on a voyage from Swansea, Glamorgan to Valparaíso, Chile. The fire was extinguished.
Etoile de la Mer	France	The schooner was destroyed by fire in the Gironde.
Etzhorn	Germany	The ship was driven ashore at Walton-on-the-Naze, Essex, United Kingdom. She was on a voyage from Bremen to Lisbon, Portugal. She was refloated and was towed in to Harwich, Essex.
Eveline	United Kingdom	The barque foundered in the Atlantic Ocean. Her crew were rescued by the steamship Australia (United Kingdom). Eveline was on a voyage from Quebec City to Leith, Lothian.
Fantasy	United Kingdom	The schooner was run down and sunk at Stettin by the steamship Melida (Germany).
Fernglen	United Kingdom	The ship was driven ashore and wrecked on the Clatsop Spit. Her crew survived. She was on a voyage from Wellington, New Zealand to Portland, Oregon, United States.
Fraternidade	Portugal	The ship foundered 9 nautical miles (17 km) off Flores Island, Azores. Her crew survived. She was on a voyage from Madeira to Halifax, Nova Scotia, Canada.
Fraternity	United Kingdom	The schooner was abandoned in the North Sea (56°08′N 0°03′E) on or before 14 October. Her crew were rescued by the schooner Pioneer (United Kingdom).
Fria	United Kingdom	The ship struck a submerged object. She put in to Peterhead, Aberdeenshire in a leaky condition.
Friedeburg	Flag unknown	The ship was holed at Mazatlán and developed a very severe leak.
Fritzoc	Norway	The brigantine was driven ashore and severely damaged at Carrickfergus, County Antrim, United Kingdom.
Fortitude	United Kingdom	The schooner was driven ashore and wrecked at Towan Beach, near St Anthony Head, Cornwall with the loss of all hands.
Friedrich II	Germany	The schooner sprang a leak and sank in the Kattegat. Her crew survived. She was on a voyage from Peterheadto Stettin.
Gazelle	United Kingdom	The ship foundered in the Baltic Sea off Rixhöft, Germany. Her crew were rescued by Rebecca (Flag unknown). Gazelle was on a voyage from Plymouth, Devon to Stettin.
General Cathcart	United Kingdom	The ship was driven ashore at "Drunmore". She was on a voyage from Ballywalter, County Antrim to Maryport, Cumberland.
Geraldine Paget	United Kingdom	The full-rigged ship was wrecked in the Pratas Islands before 20 October. She was on a voyage from Hong Kong to Portland, Oregon.
Gertrude	United Kingdom	The barque was driven ashore in Dundrum Bay. Her thirteen crew were rescued by the Tyrella Lifeboat.
Gesina	Germany	The schooner was driven ashore at Libava. She was on a voyage from Peterhead to Libava. She was refloated.
Govino	United Kingdom	The steamship ran aground on the English Bank, in the River Plate and was wrecked. Two of her crew were drowned and eleven were reported missing. She was on a voyage from Antwerp to Buenos Aires, Argentina.
Gustava	Norway	The barque was driven ashore and wrecked in Ballycotton Bay.
Gylfe	United Kingdom	The ship was driven ashore at Rimouski, Quebec.
Hamacaton	Flag unknown	The ship was abandoned in the North Sea. Six crew were rescued by the steamship Fervent (United Kingdom). Hamacaton was subsequently towed in to Bremen in a waterlogged condition.
Hebridean	United Kingdom	The steamship was driven ashore in Loch Eport. She was later refloated and towed in to Greenock, Renfrewshire on 22 October.
Helen	Flag unknown	The schooner was driven ashore and wrecked on the coast of the Newfoundland Colony with the loss of all fifteen crew.
Hellas	Germany	The schooner was abandoned in the North Sea before 17 October with the loss of a crew member. She was on a voyage from Quebec City to the River Tyne.
Hercules	United Kingdom	The fishing smack foundered in the Dogger Bank. Her crew were rescued by the steam fishing boat Europe (United Kingdom).
Humboldt	United States	The ship was wrecked in the Paracel Islands with some loss of life. She was on a voyage from Shanghai to New York.
Huntress	Germany	The barque became waterlogged in Fortune Bay.
Hypatia	United Kingdom	The barque ran aground on the Colorados, off the coast of Cuba and was abandoned. Her crew were rescued. She was on a voyage from Pascagoula, Mississippi, United States to Guayaquil, Ecuador.
Ilmatar	United Kingdom	The barque was driven ashore and wrecked near Fraserburgh, Aberdeenshire. Her crew were rescued. She was on a voyage from South Shields to Kalmar.
Iris	Sweden	The barque ran aground on the Cork Sand, in the North Sea off the coast of Essex. Her crew were rescued by the Harwich Lifeboat. She was on a voyage from Gävle to Algoa Bay. Iris was later refloated with assistance from the tug Harwich and the smacks Reindeer and Volunteer (all United Kingdom).
Island	Norway	The barque was abandoned in the Atlantic Ocean before 21 October. Her ten crew were rescued by the schooner Forest Fairy (). Island was on a voyage from Pensacola, Florida, United States to "Weighton".
Jane	United Kingdom	The schooner was driven ashore at Ballyquinton Point, County Down. She was on a voyage from Garston, Lancashire to Cienfuegos, Cuba.
John Wesley	United Kingdom	The brigantine was driven ashore at Middleton, County Durham. Her five crew were rescued by the Hartlepool Lifeboat.
Joseph	United Kingdom	The steamship was driven ashore on Saltholm, Denmark. She was on a voyage from South Shields, County Durham to Swinemünde, Germany.
Kortenaer	Netherlands	The barque was driven ashore at Brouwershaven. She was on a voyage from Kronstadt, Russia to Schiedam, South Holland.
Laura Williamson	United Kingdom	The ship was abandoned in the North Sea. She was subsequently taken in to Ostend, West Flanders, Belgium by a steamship.
Llandough	United Kingdom	The steamship was driven ashore in the Black Sea. She was on a voyage from Sulina, Romania to Malta.
Louise	Norway	The ran aground on the Lemon and Ower Sand, in the North Sea. She was on a voyage from Gävle to Marseille, Bouches-du-Rhône, France. She was refloated and assisted in to Grimsby in a waterlogged condition.
Lovise	Norway	The brig was driven ashore in St Andrews Bay. Her crew were rescued by a lifeboat. She was on a voyage from Fredrikstadt to Newcastle upon Tyne.
Ludworth	United Kingdom	The steamship sprang a leak and was beached on the Haisborough Sands, in the North Sea off the coast of Norfolk. Her crew were rescued, eight of them by the Happisburgh Lifeboat. She was on a voyage from Hartlepool, County Durham to London.
Margrethe	United Kingdom	The ship was driven ashore on Burray, Orkney Islands. Her crew were rescued. She was on a voyage from Stettin to Kirkwall, Orkney Islands.
Marianne	Norway	The barque ran aground and was wrecked at Svartklubben.
Marie Françoise	United Kingdom	The ship was driven ashore at New Romney, Kent, United Kingdom.
Marion	United Kingdom	The ship was driven ashore on Dragør, Denmark. She was on a voyage from Peterhead, Aberdeenshire to Königsberg, Germany.
Mary and Louise	Flag unknown	The schooner was wrecked in Placentia Bay.
Mary Nixon	United Kingdom	The steam collier struck the wreck of the steamship Douglas (United Kingdom) and was beached at Tilbury, Essex.
Masterpiece	United Kingdom	The fishing smack was abandoned in the Dogger Bank before 18 October. Her crew were rescued by Sunbeam (United Kingdom).
Mathilde	Denmark	The schooner was driven ashore at Lemvig. Her crew were rescued. She was on a voyage from Caen, Calvados, France to Aarhus. She was a total loss.
Meawha	Germany	The steamship was driven ashore on Utlängan, Sweden. She was on a voyage from Danzig to Copenhagen.
Meta	Flag unknown	The ship was wrecked in Scrammy Bay.
Michael Ray	Flag unknown	The full-rigged ship was wrecked on the coast of the Newfoundland Colony with the loss of one life.
Nagpore	United Kingdom	The ship ran aground in the Karnaphuli River. She was on a voyage from Liverpool to Chittagong, India.
Neptunus	Netherlands	The barque was abandoned at sea. Her crew were rescued. She was on a voyage from Sundsvall to Harlingen, Friesland. She was subsequently towed in to Harwich in a waterlogged condition.
Nora	Canada	The abandoned schooner was towed in to Crookhaven, County Cork, United Kingdom.
Nora	United Kingdom	The ship was abandoned in the Bay of Biscay. Her crew were rescued by Topdahl (France). Nora was on a voyage from Bathurst, Gambia Colony and Protectorate to London.
Oldambt	Germany	The ship was driven ashore on Skagen. She was on a voyage from Emden to Copenhagen.
Omba	United Kingdom)	The ship foundered off Newcastle, New South Wales. It is believed all on board perished. She was on a voyage from Batavia, Netherlands East Indies to Melbourne.
Onkel	Sweden	The ship was driven ashore on Skagen. She was on a voyage from Sundsvall to Honfleur, Manche, France.
Ontario	Canada	The schooner was driven ashore on the coast of the Newfoundland Colony with the loss of all but one of her crew.
Orphan Girl	United Kingdom	The ship was driven ashore at Ballymoney, County Antrim.
Pacha	United Kingdom	The steamship was abandoned in the North Sea.
Patria	Norway	The schooner was driven ashore at Wyk auf Föhr. She was a total loss.
Pax	Germany	The ship was towed in to Terschelling in a waterlogged condition by the tug Assistant (Netherlands).
Pendle Hill	United Kingdom	The ship was driven ashore at Imbituba, Brazil. She was on a voyage from Middlesbrough to Imbituba.
Pride of Bute	United Kingdom	The smack was driven ashore 2 nautical miles (3.7 km) from Fleetwood, Lancashire and was wrecked.
Providence	United Kingdom	The schooner was driven ashore 2 nautical miles (3.7 km) west of Ramsgate, Kent. She was on a voyage from Saint-Valery-sur-Somme, Somme, France to Blyth.
Retreiver	United Kingdom	The ship was driven ashore at Noordwijk, North Holland. She was on a voyage from London to Newcastle upon Tyne.
Robin Hood	United Kingdom	The steamship was abandoned at sea. Her crew were rescued. She was on a voyage from Brăila, Romania to Bremen, Germany.
Rockland	United Kingdom	The steamship ran aground on the Bredegrunden, in the Baltic Sea. She was on a voyage from Hartlepool to Kronstadt.
Rolla	United Kingdom	The schooner was driven ashore at Wyk auf Föhr. She was a total loss.
Rosina	Italy	The ship capsized in the Atlantic Ocean in late October with the loss of all but one of her crew. He was rescued eight days later by the brigantine Marianna (Portugal). Rosina was on a voyage from Catania, Sicily to New York.
Rossland	United Kingdom	The schooner was abandoned in the North Sea. She was discovered 12 nautical miles (22 km) off Whitby, Yorkshire by the steamship Elizabeth (United Kingdom), which towed her in to South Shields.
Rosy Morn	United Kingdom	The ship ran aground at Coosaw Island, South Carolina, United States. She was on a voyage from Coosaw Island to Bristol, Gloucestershire. She was refloated and resumed her voyage, but put in to Port Royal, Jamaica in a leaky condition.
Sarah Smith	United Kingdom	The brig departed from Brixham, Devon in mid-October for Newcastle upon Tyne. No further trace, presumed foundered with the loss of all hands.
Saxon Monarch	United Kingdom	The steamship foundered in the Bay of Biscay after 22 October with the loss of all 27 crew. She was on a voyage from Odesa to Antwerp, Belgium.
Sincero Primo	Italy	The ship foundered in the North Sea. Her crew survived. She was on a voyage from Newcastle upon Tyne to Buenos Aires.
Sir Robert Peel	United Kingdom	The steamship was driven ashore west of Dunkirk. She was refloated and assisted in to Dunkirk by a tug.
Sisters	(United Kingdom of Great Britain and Ireland) Guernsey	The brig was lost at sea. Her crew were rescued by the smack Prince of Wales (United Kingdom).
Skulda	United Kingdom	The ship was driven ashore in the Saint Lawrence River at Métis, Quebec.
Solide	Flag unknown	The ship was driven ashore at Métis.
Sophils	Sweden	The ship was driven ashore on Dragør. She was on a voyage from Newcastle upon Tyne to Karlshamn. She was refloated with the assistance of a steamship.
Success	United Kingdom	The fishing smack was run into by the schooner Norden (Norway) and was severely damaged. She was towed in to Lowestoft by Norden.
Sunflower	United Kingdom	The ship foundered in the North Sea 40 nautical miles (74 km) off Lowestoft. Her crew were rescued by the smack Edward (United Kingdom). Sunflower was on a voyage from Seaham, County Durham to Portsmouth, Hampshire.
Swift	United Kingdom	The smack was driven ashore and wrecked at Courtmacsherry, County Cork. She was on a voyage from Bridgwater, Somerset to Dublin.
Tabor	United Kingdom	The steamship foundered in the North Sea. Wreckage washed ashore at Friskney, Lincolnshire in late October.
Theodor	Germany	The galiot was driven ashore at Wyk auf Föhr. She was a total loss.
Thomas and Alfred	United Kingdom	The schooner was driven ashore and wrecked at North Berwick, Lothian. Her crew were rescued.
Toimi	(Russian Empire) Grand Duchy of Finland	The barque was abandoned in the North Sea. Her crew were rescued by the fishing smack Agenoria (United Kingdom). Toimi was on a voyage from Turku to Calais, France.
Tonni	United Kingdom	The ship was wrecked at Amerst, Nova Scotia.
Tordenskjold	Norway	The ship was wrecked in St Andrews Bay. She was on a voyage from Christiania to Hartlepool.
Trial	United Kingdom	The schooner struck the breakwater at Kingstown, County Dublin and sprang a leak. She was on a voyage from Newport, Monmouthshire to Dundalk, County Louth.
Tregenna	United Kingdom	The steamship was driven ashore at Kertch, Russia.
Trientje	Flag unknown	The ship was driven ashore at Norderney, Germany. She was on a voyage from Landskrona, Sweden to Woodbridge, Suffolk. She subsequently became a wreck.
Triton	United Kingdom	The smack ran aground on the Barber Sands, in the North Sea off the coast of Norfolk. She was refloated with assistance from the Caister Lifeboat and a tug and assisted in to Great Yarmouth.
Utrecht	Netherlands	The full-rigged ship ran aground at Dublin, United Kingdom.
Vasco de Gama	Norway	The ship was driven ashore at Trelleborg, Sweden.
Verein	Germany	The schooner was driven ashore at North Berwick. Her crew were rescued.
Vesper	United Kingdom	The steamship departed from Trinidad for Dieppe, Seine-Inférieure, France. No further trace, reported missing.
Victoria	Sweden	The brig was driven ashore at Amble, Northumberland. Her crew survived. She was on a voyage from Langesund, Norway to Hull.
Victory	United Kingdom	The fishing smack was driven ashore at Skerries. She was a total loss.
Vivid	United Kingdom	The Yorkshire Billyboy foundered off Hunstanton, Norfolk. Her crew were rescued by a number of smacks. She was on a voyage from Hamburg to Brancaster, Norfolk.
Wara	United Kingdom	The ship was driven ashore on Terschelling.
West Cumberland	United Kingdom	The steamship was driven ashore and severely damaged at Trelleborg. She was on a voyage from Maryport to Kronstadt. She was refloated and taken in to Copenhagen in a leaky condition.
White Crest	United Kingdom	The barque was abandoned in the North Sea 50 nautical miles (93 km) north by east of the Lemon Sand. Her crew were rescued by the smack Forward (United Kingdom). White Crest was on a voyage from Quebec City to London.
Wilhelm	Denmark	The schooner was driven ashore at Wyk auf Föhr. She was a total loss.
Windward	United Kingdom	The schooner was driven ashore in Ardneil Bay. She was on a voyage from Belfast, County Antrim to Glasgow.
Unnamed	United Kingdom	The boat was wrecked in Pegwell Bay between 14 and 18 October. There were two survivors.
Unnamed	Norway	The schooner was run down and sunk by the steamship George Locket (United Kingdom) with the loss of all but one of her crew. The survivor was rescued by George Locket.
Unnamed	Flag unknown	The barque foundered in Carlingford Bay.
Unnamed	Russia	The lighter sank at Kertch.
Unnamed	United Kingdom	The smack struck the Druid's Mare Rock, off the south coast of Devon, and foundered.
Unnamed	Netherlands	The fishing vessel was driven ashore in a capsized condition at Cromer, Norfolk with the loss of all seven crew.
Unnamed	Flag unknown	The schooner was wrecked in Lawn Bay, Newfoundland Colony with the loss of all hands.
Unnamed	United Kingdom	The schooner foundered off Faial Island, Azores on or before 23 October. Six crew, along with a dog and a cat, reached the island in a boat.
