= List of shipwrecks in January 1888 =

The list of shipwrecks in January 1888 includes ships sunk, foundered, grounded, or otherwise lost during January 1888.

== 1 January ==
List of shipwrecks: 1 January 1888
Ship	State	Description
John Potts	United Kingdom	The barque was wrecked on a reef in the Indian Ocean 300 nautical miles (560 km) from Bombay, India with the loss of her captain. Survivors were rescued on 18 January.
The Goolwa	United Kingdom	The clipper sprang a leak during heavy weather whilst en route from Penarth, Glamorgan to San Francisco, California, United States. She started to sink after the loss of the deck hatches and was abandoned in the Bay of Biscay (49°34′N 10°00′W). Her crew were rescued by the barque Cato (Norway)

== 2 January ==
List of shipwrecks: 2 January 1888
Ship	State	Description
Garibaldi	Sweden	The barque was wrecked at the mouth of the Hérault with the loss of seven of her crew.
Superbe	Germany	The barque foundered in the Atlantic while on a voyage from Newport to Cape Verde. The crew were rescued by the Austrian barque Nermina and landed at Falmouth, Cornwall.
William Porter	United States	The steamship caught fire in the Salt River five miles (8.0 km) from its mouth. She either sank., or was scuttled, with the loss of a crew member.

== 3 January ==
List of shipwrecks: 3 January 1888
Ship	State	Description
Eureka	United States	The full-rigged ship was driven ashore and wrecked near Waterford, United Kingdom with some loss of life amongst her 30 crew. She was on a voyage from San Francisco, California to Queenstown, County Cork, United Kingdom.

== 4 January ==
List of shipwrecks: 4 January 1888
Ship	State	Description
Alfred D. Snow	United States	The full-rigged ship was wrecked near Waterford, United Kingdom with the loss of all 28 crew. She was on a voyage from San Francisco, California to a British port.
Daisy	United Kingdom	The schooner ran aground on the Conister Rock, Isle of Man. She was refloated but consequently sank. All twelve people on board were rescued.
Favorita	Spain	The ship was abandoned in the Atlantic Ocean (40°13′N 9°38′W). Her crew were rescued by the steamship Delos (United Kingdom). Favorita was on a voyage from Gijón to Adra.
Jupiter	United Kingdom	The barque sprang a severe leak, caught fire and was abandoned in the Bay of Biscay. Her crew took to the boats; they were rescued the next day by the schooner Osceola (Norway). Jupiter was on a voyage from Cardiff, Glamorgan to Rio de Janeiro, Brazil.
Lyra	(United Kingdom of Great Britain and Ireland) Isle of Man	The schooner struck the Carrick Rock and sank with the loss of her Master. Three remaining crew were rescued by the Port Erin RNLI lifeboat Ann and Mary of Manchester. She was on a voyage from Liverpool, Lancashire to Dublin.
Margaret	United Kingdom	The Dundalk schooner foundered and four crew landed at Port St Mary, Isle of Man.
Unnamed	United Kingdom	The ferryboat was driven ashore and wrecked at Queenstown, County Cork.
Unnamed	Royal Navy	The launch sank at Haulbowline, County Cork.
Ten unnamed vessels	United Kingdom	The whale boats were wrecked at Haulbowline.

== 5 January ==
List of shipwrecks: 5 January 1888
Ship	State	Description
Ebor	United Kingdom	The steamship struck the quayside at Les Sables-d'Olonne, Vendée, Franch and ran aground. She was on a voyage from Sunderland, County Durham to Les Sables-d'Olonne.
Hope	United Kingdom	The schooner sank in the Irish Sea 25 nautical miles (46 km) west of the Calf of Man, Isle of Man. Her four crew survived.
Kate	Norway	The barque struck the North Rock, off the coast of County Down, United Kingdom and sank. Her crew survived.
Kydonia	Flag unknown	The steamship was lost at "Chio".
Warren J. Crosby	United States	The schooner was wrecked at Louisbourg, Nova Scotia, Canada. Wreck was sold, raised, repaired and put in Canadian service.

== 6 January ==
List of shipwrecks: 6 January 1888
Ship	State	Description
Nimble	United Kingdom	The fishing trawler was run into by the steamship Swansea (United Kingdom) and sank off Start Point, Devon with the loss of four of her five crew. The survivor was rescued by Swansea.

== 7 January ==
List of shipwrecks: 7 January 1888
Ship	State	Description
Earl Spencer	United Kingdom	The paddle steamer became stranded on the breakwater at Holyhead, Anglesey. Her 57 passengers were taken off; 50 by rocket apparatus and the rest by the Holyhead Lifeboat.
Veracity	United Kingdom	The brigantine collided with the steamship Hugh Taylor (United Kingdom) and sank south of Flamborough Head, Yorkshire. Her seven crew were rescued.

== 8 January ==
List of shipwrecks: 8 January 1888
Ship	State	Description
Clan Ogilvie	United Kingdom	The steamship was wrecked on Santa Maria Island, in the Strait of Bonifacio. All on board were rescued. She was on a voyage from Bombay India to Marseille, Bouches-du-Rhône, France.
Emma A. Cutting	United States	The schooner was wrecked on Pavilion Beach.
Mary E. Wadham	United Kingdom	The steamship ran ashore and was wrecked at Freshwater West, Pembrokeshire with the loss of a crew member. She was on a voyage from Swansea, Glamorgan to Belfast, County Antrim.
Shoreham	United Kingdom	The steamship collided with the steamship Colstrup (United Kingdom) and sank off the Kentish Knock. Ten of her crew were rescued by the steamship Prudhoe Castle (United Kingdom); seven were reported missing, presumed drowned. Shoreham was on a voyage from Shoreham-by-Sea, Sussex to Newcastle upon Tyne, Northumberland.

== 9 January ==
List of shipwrecks: 9 January 1888
Ship	State	Description
Conqueror	United Kingdom	The smack was run down and sunk by a steamship south west of the Girdler Lightship ( Trinity House), in the Thames Estuary. Her crew were rescued.
John T. Berry	United States	The ship was destroyed by fire in the Pacific Ocean. Fourteen of the 25 people on board were rescued; the rest were reported missing. She was on a voyage from Philadelphia, Pennsylvania to Hiogo, Japan.

== 10 January ==
List of shipwrecks: 10 January 1888
Ship	State	Description
Hibernia	United Kingdom	The smack was driven ashore at Kingsgate, Kent.

== 12 January ==
List of shipwrecks: 12 January 1888
Ship	State	Description
Guildford	United Kingdom	The barge was holed by the propeller of the steamship Dundee (United Kingdom) and sank in the River Thames.
Hattie N. Gove	United States	The schooner was wrecked at Port Royal, South Carolina.

== 13 January ==
List of shipwrecks: 13 January 1888
Ship	State	Description
Dordstern	Germany	The steamer went ashore in fog at Start Point, Devon.
Isaac Patch	United States	The schooner was wrecked at Grand Manan. Her crew were rescued.
Milan	United Kingdom	The steamship was driven ashore and wrecked at Overton, Glamorgan. 11 of her crew were rescued by the RNLI Port Eynon Lifeboat, with the remaining crew rescued by rocket apparatus. She was on a voyage from Bristol, Gloucestershire to Alexandria, Egypt.

== 14 January ==
List of shipwrecks: 14 January 1888
Ship	State	Description
Shamrock	France	The transport ship ran aground in the Bay of Belligam, Ceylon. She was refloated and resumed her voyage to Colombo, Ceylon.

== 15 January ==
List of shipwrecks: 15 January 1888
Ship	State	Description
Gauloise	France	The 332 ton barque of Bordeaux sailed onto Great Arthur Island on the northern edge of Crow Sound. She was carrying pitprops for Porthcawl and heading NNE when fog came down 14 miles (23 km) south of St Agnes light.
Unnamed	United Kingdom	The smack was run down and sunk in the North Sea by the steamship James Malam (United Kingdom) with the loss of all hands.

== 16 January ==
List of shipwrecks: 16 January 1888
Ship	State	Description
Edinburgh Castle	United Kingdom	The barque ran aground at Warrnambool, Victoria and was subsequently wrecked in a gale. All on board survived. She was on a voyage from London to Warrnambool.
Taunton	United Kingdom	The ketch sank off Ilfracombe, Devon and the crew were landed at Ilfracombe.
Unnamed	United Kingdom	The pilot cutter was run down and sunk at Cardiff, Glamorgan by the steamship Belmont (United Kingdom) with the loss of all hands.

== 17 January ==
List of shipwrecks: 17 January 1888
Ship	State	Description
Freidis	Norway	The barque collided with the steamship Toronto (United Kingdom) and sank off The Skerries, Anglesey, United Kingdom with the loss of all but one of her crew. Freidis was on a voyage from Liverpool, Lancashire to Savannah, Georgia, United States.
Sylvester	United States	The schooner was wrecked at Brace's Cove. Her crew were rescued.
Winthorpe	United Kingdom	The steamship was driven ashore at the mouth of the River Wear.

== 18 January ==
List of shipwrecks: 18 January 1888
Ship	State	Description
Bonita	United Kingdom	The smack was driven ashore near Mousehole, Cornwall. She was on a voyage from Chatham, Kent to Bristol, Gloucestershire. She was refloated and taken in to Mousehole.
Oxfordshire	United Kingdom	The steamship collided with the steamship Cascapedia (United Kingdom) and sank in the Atlantic Ocean with the loss of all but five of her crew. Survivors were rescued by Cascapedia. Oxfordshire was on a voyage from Carloforte, Sardinia, Italy to Antwerp, Belgium.
Vilhelm Foss	Norway	The barque collided with the full-rigged ship Ardmore (United Kingdom) and sank in the Atlantic Ocean off the Isles of Scilly, United Kingdom. Her crew were rescued by Ardmore.

== 19 January ==
List of shipwrecks: 19 January 1888
Ship	State	Description
Bronx	United States	The tug was run down and sunk in the East River off Blackwell's Island, New York City by the steamship Miranda ( Canada). Her fireman drowned.

== 20 January ==
List of shipwrecks: 20 January 1888
Ship	State	Description
Anna H. Mason	United States	The schooner was sunk in a collision at Portsmouth, New Hampshire.
Danos	United Kingdom	The steamship ran aground on Zea, Greece and sank. Her crew were rescued by the steamship William Symington (United Kingdom).
Elsie	United Kingdom	The steamship was driven ashore and wrecked on Lundy Island, Devon. Her crew were rescued.
Kongsek	Norway	The brigantine ran aground on the Atherfield Ledge, in the English Channel off the Isle of Wight, United Kingdom. All nine people on board were rescued. She was on a voyage from Cádiz, Spain to Holmestrand.
Prarie Flower	United Kingdom	The tug was driven ashore at Breaksea Point, Glamorgan. She was later refloated and taken in to Newport, Monmouthshire for repairs.
Unnamed	Germany	The derelict barque was driven ashore near Ilfracombe, Devon.

== 21 January ==
List of shipwrecks: 21 January 1888
Ship	State	Description
Constance	United Kingdom	The steamship ran onto the Shagstone Rocks, off Plymouth, Devon and sank with the loss of three of her crew.
Switzerland	Belgium	The steamship collided with the steamship La Gascogne (France) in the Upper New York Bay and was severely damaged at the bow. She put into New York, United States for repairs. She was later returned to service.

== 22 January ==
List of shipwrecks: 22 January 1888
Ship	State	Description
May Queen	United Kingdom	The barque was wrecked in Lyttelton Harbour, New Zealand. She was on a voyage from London to Lyttelton Harbour.
Pfenna Wilhelmina	United Kingdom	The schooner went ashore, in Mount's Bay, near Penzance Harbour, Cornwall in dense fog. The cargo of coal was discharged.

== 24 January ==
List of shipwrecks: 24 January 1888
Ship	State	Description
Suez	France	The steamship collided with Dethmarschen (Flag unknown) and sank off Cape Espichel, Portugal. Twelve of her crew survived, the rest were reported missing. Suez was on a voyage from Penarth, Glamorgan, United Kingdom to Marseille, Bouches-du-Rhône.

== 25 January ==
List of shipwrecks: 25 January 1888
Ship	State	Description
Albert William	United Kingdom	The schooner was partly abandoned in the Ribble Estuary. Ten of her twelve crew were taken off by the Lytham St. Anne's Lifeboat, the others refused to leave.
Etta Gott	United States	The schooner was wrecked on Big Spoon Island near Isle au Haut, Maine. The crew of eleven men remained on a desolate island for a week before they were discovered and rescued.
Louisa	United Kingdom	The schooner foundered in the North Sea off the coast of Yorkshire. Her four crew were rescued by the schooner Briton (United Kingdom). Louisa was on a voyage from Erith, Kent to Inverness.
Rokeby	United Kingdom	The steamship struck a rock and foundered off Conil de la Frontera, Spain. Her crew were rescued by the revenue cutter Viva (Spain). Rokeby was on a voyage from Newport, Monmouthshire to Savona, Italy.

== 26 January ==
List of shipwrecks: 26 January 1888
Ship	State	Description
Finance	United States	The schooner was wrecked on Blanche Island, Nova Scotia, Canada with the loss of two of her crew.

== 27 January ==
List of shipwrecks: 27 January 1888
Ship	State	Description
Clara Peters	Germany	The schooner foundered in the North Sea 50 nautical miles (93 km) off Spurn Point, Yorkshire, United Kingdom. Her crew were rescued by a fishing smack. She was on a voyage from Fowey, Cornwall to Bridgeness, Lothian, United Kingdom.
Europa	United Kingdom	The steamship was wrecked off Deal, Kent, during dense fog, while carrying wine from Portugal to London. Two of the crew lost their lives and the cargo, valued at £70,000 was also lost.
Goethe	Norway	The barque was abandoned in the Atlantic Ocean (44°44′N 11°40′W). Her crew were rescued by the steamship Niger (United Kingdom). Goethe was on a voyage from Torrevieja, Spain to Moss.
Isle of Dursey	United Kingdom	The steamship ran aground in the River Ouse. She was on a voyage from Seville, Spain to Goole, Yorkshire. She was refloated with the assistance of three tugs and taken in to Goole.

== 28 January ==
List of shipwrecks: 28 January 1888
Ship	State	Description
Gleaner	United States	The steamship was swamped in a heavy squall in the Columbia River near Astoria, Oregon. Three passengers died.
Jane Maria	United Kingdom	The schooner was abandoned off Cromer, Norfolk, whilst on passage from Hartlepool to Greenwich with a cargo of coal. Her crew of seven were rescued by the RNLI Cromer lifeboat Benjamin Bond Cabbell.
Joseph Howe	United Kingdom	The ship ran aground and capsized at Liverpool, Lancashire. She was on a voyage from Glasgow, Renfrewshire to Widnes, Cheshire.
Laurina	United Kingdom	The smack was wrecked on the Stony Binks, at the mouth of the Humber. Her crew were rescued by the Spurn Lifeboat.
Restless	United States	The schooner was severely damaged by high seas on Brown's Bank on 18 January, drifting rudderless in snow storms. The crew was taken off by the schooner Harry Lewis (United States) an hour before she sank on 28 January.

== 29 January ==
List of shipwrecks: 29 January 1888
Ship	State	Description
Gulnare	Denmark	The schooner ran aground in the River Stour at Wrabness, Essex, United Kingdom. She was on a voyage from Kalundborg to Mistley, Essex.
Margaret	United Kingdom	The schooner was discovered abandoned off the Smalls Lighthouse, Wales by Magic (United Kingdom). She put three of her crew aboard. They took her in to Plymouth, Devon.

== 30 January ==
List of shipwrecks: 30 January 1888
Ship	State	Description
Arabella	United Kingdom	The schooner sank while on a voyage from New York to Halifax, Nova Scotia, with the loss of six lives.

== 31 January ==
List of shipwrecks: 31 January 1888
Ship	State	Description
Darnet	United Kingdom	The ship was driven ashore at Reculver, Kent. She was then run into by Glen Ross (United Kingdom). Darnet was on a voyage from Portland, Dorset to London. She was refloated and taken in to Whitstable, Kent.
Eliza Jane	United Kingdom	The lugger sank at Sandgate, Kent. Her crew were rescued.
Eversfield	United Kingdom	The steamship foundered in the Horse Channel. Her crew survived.
John C. Wade	United Kingdom	The schooner was driven ashore near Wexford.

== Unknown date ==
List of shipwrecks: Unknown date in January 1888
Ship	State	Description
Activ	Germany	The schooner was driven ashore on Skagen, Denmark. She was on a voyage from Newcastle upon Tyne, Northumberland, United Kingdom to Sønderborg, Denmark.
Agatha	United Kingdom	The barque was destroyed by fire at sea. Her crew were rescued by the barque Mary Hogarth (United Kingdom). Agatha was on a voyage from Swansea, Glamorgan to Martinique.
Albert H. Locke	United Kingdom	The ship was driven ashore and wrecked at Worthing, Sussex.
Ann Elizabeth	United Kingdom	The ship was driven ashore and wrecked at Clovelly, Devon. Her crew were rescued.
Arcadia	United Kingdom	The steamship was driven ashore on Stronsay, Orkney Islands. She was refloated on 27 January.
Ban Mazuranich	Austria-Hungary	The barque ran aground in the River Ouse and was severely damaged. She was on a voyage from Jamaica to Goole, Yorkshire, United Kingdom. She was refloated on 30 January and taken in to Goole.
Beignon	United Kingdom	The steamship ran aground in the Gulf of Xeros. She was later refloated and taken in to Dedeagatch, Ottoman Empire.
Bengal	United Kingdom	The steamship was abandoned at sea with the loss of her captain. She was on a voyage from Cardiff, Glamorgan to Port Said, Egypt.
Boscoppa	United Kingdom	The ship was driven ashore and wrecked at Clovelly. Her crew were rescued.
Dakota	Germany	The full-rigged ship was driven ashore at Lemvig, Norway with the loss of her captain. She was on a voyage from Hamburg to Christiania, Norway.
Devon	United Kingdom	The ketch was driven ashore and wrecked at Clovelly. Her crew were rescued.
Dunluce	United Kingdom	The steamship was driven ashore at Porto Tolle, Italy. She was later refloated with the assistance of a steamship and taken in to Alberoni, Italy.
Eleanor Margaret	Flag unknown	The ship ran aground in the Raccoon Strait.
Electric	United Kingdom	The ship was driven ashore at "Burnham". She was later refloated.
Excelsior	United Kingdom	The ship was driven ashore at Lindisfarne, Northumberland. She was on a voyage from Port Gordon, Moray to South Shields, County Durham.
Fanny	Flag unknown	The ship was wrecked in the Caicos Islands. She was on a voyage from San Domingo to Hamburg.
Galgate	United Kingdom	The full-rigged ship was destroyed by fire at sea. Her crew were rescued by the brig Sulfoy (Sweden). Galgate was on a voyage from Calcutta, India to New York.
Godolphin	United Kingdom	The steamship was driven ashore at Black Head, Cornwall.
Graf Otto von Zums	Germany	The schooner was driven ashore in Llandudno Bay. She was on a voyage from Belize City, British Honduras to Goole.
Haarfanger	Norway	The barque was driven ashore and wrecked at Skibbereen, County Cork, United Kingdom. Her crew were rescued. She was on a voyage from Cardiff to the Congo Free State.
Herlon	United Kingdom	The barque was wrecked on the Half Moon Kaye Reef. She was on a voyage from Buenos Aires, Argentina to Belize City.
Illinor	United Kingdom	The schooner was driven ashore and wrecked at Ballyquinton Point, County Down. Her crew were rescued. She was on a voyage from Bangor, County Down to Ayr.
Jane	United Kingdom	The ship was driven ashore and wrecked at Clovelly. Her crew were rescued.
Johanne	Denmark	The schooner was driven ashore on Terschelling, Friesland, Netherlands. She was on a voyage from Karlskrona, Sweden to Africa.
Kate Fawcett	United Kingdom	The steamship ran aground in the River Tweed. She was on a voyage from Coosaw Island, South Carolina, United States to Berwick upon Tweed, Northumberland.
Kingfisher	United Kingdom	The steam trawler was driven ashore 2 nautical miles (3.7 km) south of Rattray Head, Aberdeenshire. Her ten crew were rescued by rocket apparatus.
Knight Commander	United Kingdom	The ship ran aground in the River Tay. She was on a voyage from Montrose, Forfarshire to Melbourne, Victoria. She was refloated and towed in to Leith, Lothian for repairs.
Knight Templar	United Kingdom	The steamship collided with the steamship Chrysolite (United Kingdom) and ran aground at Poti, Russia.
Lady Ann	United Kingdom	The steamship ran aground on the Cross Sand, in the North Sea off the coast of Norfolk.
Linden	United Kingdom	The steamship foundered off Sunderland, County Durham. Her crew were rescued. She was on a voyage from London to Sunderland.
Malfitatre	United Kingdom	The ship was driven ashore at "Burnham". She was later refloated.
Maritona	United Kingdom	The ship collided with the steamship City of Texas (United Kingdom) at Savannah, Georgia, United States and was severely damaged.
Moss Rose	United Kingdom	The ship was abandoned at sea. She was on a voyage from Liverpool to Aspinwall, Colombia.
Norah	United Kingdom	The steamship ran aground off "Tusla", Romania.
Père Jacques	United Kingdom	The brig was driven ashore and wrecked at Saint Pierre and Miquelon.
Quatro Fratelli II	Italy	The schooner foundered in the Adriatic Sea off Fasano. She was on a voyage from Chioggia to Sicily.
Remus	Flag unknown	The steamship was driven ashore and wrecked at Pula, Austria-Hungary. Her crew were rescued.
Rose	United Kingdom	The steamship was driven ashore at Amble, Northumberland.
Semantha	United Kingdom	The ship was wrecked in Gorda Bay before 17 January. Her crew were rescued.
Thessalus	Greece	The ship foundered off "Nealvi". Her crew were rescued. She was on a voyage from the Black Sea to Nice, Alpes-Maritimes, France.
Triton	Sweden	The barque was run into by a Danish steamship in the River Tyne and was severely damaged.
Vrouw Anna	Netherlands	The tjalk collided with the steamship Sachsen (Germany) and sank in the Scheldt at Kruisschans, Belgium. Vrouw Anna was on a voyage from Rotterdam, South Holland to Antwerp, Belgium.
Wave	United Kingdom	The ketch was driven ashore and wrecked at Clovelly. Her crew were rescued.
Whitehead	United Kingdom	The ship was driven ashore at Rone, Gotland, Sweden. She was refloated and taken in to Copenhagen, Denmark.
William Dodds	United Kingdom	The tug was driven ashore at Tynemouth, Northumberland and was severely damaged. She was later refloated and taken into the River Tyne for repairs.
Unnamed	United States	The pilot boat collided with Sir William Wallace (United Kingdom) and sank at San Francisco, California.
Unnamed	Flag unknown	The ship was driven ashore near Toe Head, County Cork.
