= Ekenäs =

Ekenäs, composed of the Swedish words ek- (oak) and näs (promontory or peninsula), is a place name in Fennoscandia. In particular it refers to:

- Ekenäs, Finland, a town in the municipality of Raseborg, formerly an independent city
- Ekenäs Castle in Linköping Municipality, Sweden
- Ekenäs, Kalmar, a village in Kalmar Municipality, Sweden

== See also ==
- Ekenäs Idrottsförening, a sports club from Ekenäs, Raseborg in Finland
