= List of shipwrecks in April 1887 =

The list of shipwrecks in April 1887 includes ships sunk, foundered, grounded, or otherwise lost during April 1887.

== 1 April ==
List of shipwrecks: 1 April 1887
| Ship | State | Description |
|---|---|---|
| Alexander | United Kingdom | The fishing boat was driven ashore and wrecked at Cellardyke, Fife. Her crew were rescued. |
| Flower of Obrig | United Kingdom | The schooner was driven ashore and wrecked at Murkle, Caithness. Her crew were rescued. She was on a voyage from Leith, Lothian to Castlehill. |
| James | United Kingdom | The ship was driven ashore at Murkle. |
| Little Fred | United Kingdom | The ship was driven ashore and wrecked at Lindisfarne, Northumberland. Her crew were rescued. She was on a voyage from Sunderland, County Durham to Montrose, Forfarshire. |
| Pêcheries Françaises | United Kingdom | The ship ran aground on the Hull Sands, in the North Sea off the coast of Norfolk, United Kingdom. |
| Power | United Kingdom | The tugboat collided with the barque Ruggerio Primo (Italy) off Cape la Heve, Seine-Inférieure, France and was severely damaged. Power put in to Plymouth, Devon. |
| St. Matthaus | United Kingdom | The ship ran aground on the East Hoyle Bank, in Liverpool Bay. Her crew were rescued by the Liverpool Lifeboat. She was on a voyage from Liverpool, Lancashire to New York, United States. |
| Three unnamed vessels | United Kingdom | Three fishing smacks foundered off Fraserburgh, Aberdeenshire. |
| Unnamed | United Kingdom | A fishing smack was driven ashore at Fraserburgh. |
| Unnamed | Flag unknown | A ship was wrecked off Newport, Pembrokeshire, United Kingdom. |
| Unnamed | United Kingdom | A fishing boat was driven ashore at North Sunderland, Northumberland. Her crew were rescued. |

== 4 April ==
List of shipwrecks: 4 April 1887
| Ship | State | Description |
|---|---|---|
| Tobago | France | The steamship was wrecked near Cape Finisterre, Spain. |
| Venus | United Kingdom | The brig was abandoned in the North Sea. Her crew were rescued by the smack Speculator (United Kingdom). Venus was on a voyage from Gothenburg, Sweden to Newcastle upon Tyne, Northumberland. She was towed in to Scarborough, Yorkshire by the steam trawler Star (United Kingdom). |
| Wiltshire | United Kingdom | The ship was damaged entering Saint-Malo, Ille-et-Vilaine, France and was beached. She was on a voyage from South Shields, County Durham to Saint-Malo. |

== 5 April ==
List of shipwrecks: 5 April 1887
| Ship | State | Description |
|---|---|---|
| Arcturus | Denmark | The steamship collided with the steamship Savona (United Kingdom) and sank off Falsterbo, Sweden. Her crew were rescued by Savona. |
| Brazileira | Norway | The barque struck a rock off Cozumel, Mexico and was wrecked. She was on a voyage from Belize City, British Honduras to Goole, Yorkshire, United Kingdom. |

== 6 April ==
List of shipwrecks: 6 April 1887
| Ship | State | Description |
|---|---|---|
| Bessie Hiller | United Kingdom | The ship ran aground on the North Gare, off the mouth of the River Tees. She was on a voyage from Margate, Kent to Seaham, County Durham. |
| Charles | United Kingdom | The barge was run into by the steamship Alford (United Kingdom) and sank in the River Thames at Rotherhithe, Surrey. |
| Darwin | United Kingdom | The steamship ran aground at Belfast, County Antrim. She was on a voyage from Baltimore, Maryland, United States to Belfast. She was refloated and taken in to Belfast. |
| Willem | Germany | The schooner was driven ashore at Marske-by-the-Sea, Yorkshire, United Kingdom. Her crew were rescued by a fishing coble. She was on a voyage from South Shields to Hartlepool, County Durham, United Kingdom. |
| Unnamed | Flag unknown | A schooner foundered off the Crow Rock, off the coast of Pembrokeshire, United Kingdom. Her crew were rescued by another schooner. |

== 7 April ==
List of shipwrecks: 7 April 1887
| Ship | State | Description |
|---|---|---|
| Charles Morand | United Kingdom | The steamship ran aground on the Blacktail Sand, in the Thames Estuary. |
| Emma | United Kingdom | The Thames barge collided with the steamship Hewett (United Kingdom) and sank in the River Thames at Northfleet, Kent. Her crew were rescued. |
| Wilhelm I | Germany | The barque was abandoned in the Atlantic Ocean and set afire. Her crew were rescued by General Roberts (United Kingdom). |

== 8 April ==
List of shipwrecks: 8 April 1887
| Ship | State | Description |
|---|---|---|
| Bjorntras | Flag unknown | The ship was abandoned in the Atlantic Ocean. Her crew were rescued by the steamship Nordlyset (flag unknown). Bjorntras was on a voyage from "Brunswick" to Kronstadt, Russia. |
| Bride of Lorne | United Kingdom | The schooner was wrecked on Santa Rosa Island, Florida, United States (30°17′N 87°13′W), or just west of the Pensacola Pass. |

== 13 April ==
List of shipwrecks: 13 April 1887
| Ship | State | Description |
|---|---|---|
| Victoria | United Kingdom | The steamship ran onto rocks and was wrecked at Cape Ailly, near Varengeville-sur-Mer, Seine-Inférieure, France with the loss of nineteen of the 90 people on board. She was on a voyage from Newhaven, Sussex to Dieppe, Seine-Inférieure. |

== 14 April ==
List of shipwrecks: 14 April 1887
| Ship | State | Description |
|---|---|---|
| Buckhurst | United Kingdom | The ship was damaged by fire at Dundee, Forfarshire. |
| Corsair | United States | The tug struck the bank of the Mississippi River just upstream of New Orleans, Louisiana in fog causing her to careen and sink. A female passenger died. |
| Lockton | United Kingdom | The steamship caught fire at Lisbon, Portugal. |
| Trindeln Lightship | Denmark | The lightship was driven ashore on Læsø. |
| Two unnamed vessels | Flags unknown | Two ships were driven ashore on Læsø. |

== 15 April ==
List of shipwrecks: 15 April 1887
| Ship | State | Description |
|---|---|---|
| Svadilfare | Norway | The barque was abandoned in the Atlantic Ocean. Her crew were rescued by Prince Amadeo (flag unknown). Svadilfare was on a voyage from Liverpool, Lancashire, United Kingdom to Bic, Quebec, Canada. |

== 16 April ==
List of shipwrecks: 16 April 1887
| Ship | State | Description |
|---|---|---|
| Betsy and Helen | United Kingdom | The fishing smack capsized in the North Sea 18 nautical miles (33 km) east north east of Coquet Island, Northumberland with the loss of at least two lives. She was towed into the River Tyne by the steam trawler Scotia (United Kingdom. |
| Unnamed | United Kingdom | A steamship foundered off Bonifacio, Corsica, France. |

== 17 April ==
List of shipwrecks: 17 April 1887
| Ship | State | Description |
|---|---|---|
| Aimable Dolores | Spain | The brigantine was driven ashore in the Bay of Bormes. She was on a voyage from Rosas to Marseille, Bouches-du-Rhône, France. |
| Breeze | United Kingdom | The yawl was run down and sunk in the English Channel 8 nautical miles (15 km) east of Beachy Head, Sussex by the steamship Australia (Germany) with the loss of four of the five people on board. Breeze was on a voyage from Fowey, Cornwall to Great Yarmouth, Norfolk. |
| Unnamed | Flag unknown | Two ships collided in the English Channel off the South Foreland, Kent, United Kingdom. At least one vessel, which was on a voyage from Rotterdam, South Holland, Netherlands to New York, sank with loss of life. |
| Unnamed' | Flag unknown | A ship ran aground on the Sunk Sand or Longsand, in the North Sea off the coast of Essex, United Kingdom. The Walton Lifeboat could find no trace of her. |
| Unnamed | Flag unknown | A ship ran aground on the Middle Sand, in the North Sea off the coast of Essex, and caught fire. |

== 18 April ==
List of shipwrecks: 18 April 1887
| Ship | State | Description |
|---|---|---|
| Albion | United Kingdom | The Mersey Flat foundered off the West Hoyle Bank, in Liverpool Bay. Her crew were rescued by a fishing boat. |
| Tasmania | United Kingdom | The steamship was wrecked on the Monachai Rocks, off the coast of Corsica, France with the loss of 35 of the 281 people on board. The yacht Pérséverant (France rescued at least 75 survivors; 74 were landed in Tasmania's boats. An Italian steamship and a British yacht were also despatched to assist. Tasmania was on a voyage from Bombay, India to Marseille, Bouches-du-Rhône, France. |

== 20 April ==
List of shipwrecks: 20 April 1887
| Ship | State | Description |
|---|---|---|
| Escort | United Kingdom | The naval iron paddle dockyard tug, while target towing, was wrecked on Monsicar Reef, off Malta, with the loss of three lives. |

== 23 April ==
List of shipwrecks: 23 April 1887
| Ship | State | Description |
|---|---|---|
| Ino | United Kingdom | The barge was run into by the steamship Italia (United Kingdom) at Millwall, Essex with the loss of a lighterman. She was beached in a sinking condition with the assistance of a tug. |

== 26 April ==
List of shipwrecks: 26 April 1887
| Ship | State | Description |
|---|---|---|
| Asia | United Kingdom | The paddle tug collided with the steamship Cuthonia (United Kingdom) and sank in the North Sea off Seaham, County Durham. Her crew were rescued. |
| Ciss | United Kingdom | The yacht ran aground on the Haven Hole Spit, in the Thames Estuary. She was on a voyage from "Haven Hole" to Erith, Kent. She was refloated and completed her voyage. |
| Normandy | (United Kingdom of Great Britain and Ireland) Jersey | The cutter foundered north of Jersey with the loss of two of her three crew. She was on a voyage from Jersey to Saint-Valery-sur-Somme, Somme, France. |

== 27 April ==
List of shipwrecks: 27 April 1887
| Ship | State | Description |
|---|---|---|
| Finland | United Kingdom | The steamship was wrecked near the mouth of the Kowie River. All on board were rescued. She was on a voyage from Cape Town, Cape Colony to Mauritius. |

== 28 April ==
List of shipwrecks: 28 April 1887
| Ship | State | Description |
|---|---|---|
| Zia G. | Italy | The ship departed from The Downs for Savona, No further trace, reported missing. |
| Unnamed | France | A fishing boat collided with the steamship Forest Queen (United Kingdom) and sank with the loss of a crew member. |

== 29 April ==
List of shipwrecks: 29 April 1887
| Ship | State | Description |
|---|---|---|
| Ellen Owen | United Kingdom | The smack struck the Half Tide Rock and was damaged. She was on a voyage from Caernarfon to Swansea, Glamorgan. She put in to Milford Haven, Pembrokeshire in a leaky condition. |
| Empress | United Kingdom | The barque was abandoned in the Atlantic Ocean. Her crew were rescued by Gefion (flag unknown). Empress was on a voyage from Puerto Cabello, Venezuela to Swansea. |

== Unknown date ==
List of shipwrecks: Unknown date in April 1887
| Ship | State | Description |
|---|---|---|
| Agnes | Germany | The barque capsized off Falsterbo, Sweden. Her crew were rescued by the barque O. F. Mass (Germany). |
| Argonauta | Italy | The barque was towed in to Montevideo, Uruguay in a sinking condition. She was beached. |
| Bowesfield | United Kingdom | The steamship ran aground at Kertch, Russia. She was refloated on 3 April. |
| Diamond | United Kingdom | The steamship was driven ashore at the Surop Lighthouse, Russia. |
| Dienstag | Germany | The barque was driven ashore at Falsterbo. She was on a voyage from Stettin to Honfleur, Manche, France. |
| English Maid | United Kingdom | The schooner was driven ashore and wrecked at Portreath, Cornwall. Her crew were rescued. She was on a voyage from Newport, Monmouthshire to Portreath. |
| Glaslyn | United Kingdom | The ship was reported to have been wrecked at Coquimbo, Chile. Her crew were rescued. She was on a voyage from Coquimbo to Cardiff, Glamorgan, or from Fremantle, Western Australia to Shanghai, China. |
| Gwendoline | United Kingdom | The steamship was driven ashore at Terneuzen, Zeeland, Netherlands. She was on a voyage from Middlesbrough, Yorkshire to Terneuzen. |
| Harmonia | Germany | The ship was abandoned at Hirtshals, Denmark. Her crew were rescued. |
| Henry Parr | Norway | The ship was wrecked on the Shipwash Sand, in the North Sea off the coast of Suffolk, United Kingdom. Her crew were rescued by the steamship Nerissa (United Kingdom). |
| Johanna | Flag unknown | The ship was abandoned in the Atlantic Ocean. She was on a voyage from Havana, Cuba to New York, United States. |
| Kepler | United Kingdom | The steamship ran aground in the Schuylkill River. She was on a voyage from Mazarrón, Spain to Philadelphia, Pennsylvania. |
| Magan | France | The yacht was cut in two by the steamship Chusan (United Kingdom and sank in the Mediterranean Sea. Two crew and the captain died. |
| Mary Freeman | United Kingdom | The brigantine collided with the barque Mary Lee (Sweden) and sank at Barbados with the loss of a crew member. |
| Mary L. Cushing | United States | The full-rigged ship was driven ashore on Block Island, Rhode Island. She was on a voyage from New York to Hong Kong. |
| Meteor, and Wolviston | Germany; United Kingdom | The barque Meteor collided with the steamship Wolviston and sank. Her crew were rescued. She was on a voyage from Hamburg to Talcahuano, Mexico. Wolviston was on a voyage from the Black Sea to Hamburg. She was severely damaged and put in to Cuxhaven. |
| Mexico | Flag unknown | The steamship was driven ashore in the Gulf of Georgia. |
| Perseverance | United Kingdom | The ship was driven ashore and severely damaged at Herne Bay, Kent. Her crew were rescued. |
| Ragna | Norway | The barque was abandoned in the Atlantic Ocean. Her crew were rescued by the schooner Energy (United Kingdom). Ragna was on a voyage from Savannah, Georgia, United States to Saint Petersburg, Russia. |
| Raiatea | Germany | The steamship was destroyed by fire in the Pacific Ocean before 17 April. All on board were rescued, but a passenger subsequently died. She was on a voyage from San Francisco, California, United States to Tahiti. |
| R. F. Matthews | United States | The ship was driven ashore on Saint Helena Island, South Carolina. She was on a voyage from Coosaw Island, South Carolina to a British port. |
| Richard | Norway | The barque was abandoned in the Atlantic Ocean. Her crew were rescued by the steamship Ethiopia (flag unknown). Richard was on a voyage from Ayr, United Kingdom to New York. |
| Rjukan | Norway | The full-rigged ship was abandoned in the Atlantic Ocean. Her crew were rescued. She was on a voyage from Newport, Monmouthshire to Quebec City, Canada. |
| Russia | Germany | The steamship was driven ashore at Falsterbo. She was on a voyage from Stettin to Rotterdam, South Holland, Netherlands. |
| Saragossa | United States | The steamship foundered in the Atlantic Ocean. She was on a voyage from Baltimore, Maryland to Port Antonio, Jamaica. |
| Scotia | Flag unknown | The ship was driven ashore 15 nautical miles (28 km) east of Fire Island, New York, United States. She was on a voyage from Marseille, Bouches-du-Rhône, France to New York City. |
| Silverdale | United Kingdom | The ship ran aground at Workington, Cumberland. |
| Sokoto | Flag unknown | The ship was abandoned at sea. Her crew were rescued. She was on a voyage from PhiladelphiaPhiladelphia to Messina, Sicily, Italy. |
| Stroma | Flag unknown | The steamship was driven ashore at the Head of Passes. She was later refloated. |
| Tom John Taylor | United Kingdom | The steamship collided with the steamship Hansa (Germany) and sank at Hamburg. Tom John Taylor was on a voyage from South Shields, County Durham to Hamburg. |
| Uckermünde | Germany | The barque was driven ashore at Falsterbo. She was on a voyage from Stettin to Honfleur. |
| Vasco | Spain | The steamship was lost at Cape Penas. Her crew were rescued. |
| Viking | United Kingdom | The schooner ran aground in the Cromarty Firth and was severely damaged. She was on a voyage from Inverness to Dingwall, Ross-shire. She was refloated and found to be leaky. |
| Volta | United Kingdom | The steamship was wrecked 2 nautical miles (3.7 km) south of Mykonos, Greece with the loss of eleven of her 24 crew. |
| Walton | United Kingdom | The steamship ran aground at Galaţi, Romania. She was refloated on 25 April. |
| Zaire | United Kingdom | The steamship was driven ashore at Trieste before 25 April. |
| Zelia | United Kingdom | The ship was wrecked on Mayaguana, Bahamas. She was on a voyage from Nuevitas, Cubat to the English Channel. |
| Unnamed | Germany | A steamship ran aground on the Blacktail Sand, in the Thames Estuary. |
