= May Queen (barque) =

Scottish sailing vessel

May Queen was an iron barque of 733 tons net register. It was built at Aberdeen, Scotland, launched in May 1869, and was wrecked near Lyttelton Harbour, New Zealand, in January 1888.

== Construction ==
May Queen was built by A. Hall and Company, Aberdeen. It weighed 733 tons net register, had a length of 178.6 feet (54.4 m), and a beam of 31.2 feet (9.5 m).

== Final voyage and stranding ==
May Queen, inward bound from London carrying 1,200 tons of cargo, approached Lyttelton Heads on 26 January 1888. A pilot from the port boarded the ship outside the heads, and beat up against a strong, uncertain breeze. The pilot took the vessel too close to the south shore of Lyttelton Harbour, near Red Rock. A squall called the ship to miss stays, and it was carried on to the rocks.

A tug from the port endeavoured to tow May Queen free, but failed. The ship had run aground at high tide; as the tide ebbed the ship became lodged on the rocks. Rocks penetrated the hull, and boats from the port discharged most of the cargo before the ship became a total wreck. May Queen was abandoned to the underwriters on 27 January 1888.

== Salvage ==
Between 500 and 600 tons of cargo was salved from the wreck, along with various cabin fittings. A mahogany sideboard and couch from May Queen are now displayed at Lyttelton Museum.

== Shipwreck ==
The wreck of May Queen lies in Lyttelton Harbour, where the ship sank. The ship lies in 7 metres (3.8 fathoms) of water on the harbour floor, though is mostly buried in the sand and silt.
