= Coosaw Island =

Island in Beaufort County, South Carolina, United States

Coordinates: 32°28′32″N 80°35′08″W

Coosaw Island is one of South Carolina's Sea Islands. It is part of Beaufort County, South Carolina. The island is rural and residential. A narrow creek separates it from Lady's Island. It is named for a tribe of Native Americans who inhabited the area, the Coosaw band of Native Americans.

== History ==
An uprising reportedly occurred on the island in 1715.

John Bull (ca. 1693–1767) lived on the island and it was known as Bull's Island. His wife was reportedly taken by Native Americans while he was away and never heard from again.

Landgrave Joseph Morton acquired it.

Surgeon Thomas P. Knox, an abolitionist who served with the U.S. Army in South Carolina until being fired for encouraging black people to exercise their political rights, wrote about deplorable conditions of freed slaves on this and other islands accusing a relief organization and Rufus Saxton of fraudulent activities.

In 1863, U.S. president Abraham Lincoln gave instructions to U.S. tax commissioners regarding the island and other areas. After the Civil War the 6,500 acre island, part of a "cluster of sub-tropical, swampy, malaria-infested Sea Islands west of St. Helena Sound was where thousands of "contraband" escaped slaves were held on the islands. The islands were sold off on the cheap after General Sherman's attempts to manage the island for agricultural production by freedmen failed to pan out by 1864.

A Penn School graduate taught at a one room school house on the island documented in a photograph.

In 1937, a Work Projects Administration guide to South Carolina described the island as being inhabited "solely by negroes" and as having no telephone service, bathing facilities, or cars on it.

In 2003 a 40 page report on its shell ring complex was published.

== Geography ==
Coosaw Island is 10 miles northeast of Beaufort, South Carolina. South Bluff Heritage Preserve is on the island. It includes ring sites (List of shell ring sites) dating from 5,000-3,000 years ago.

== See also ==
- List of shipwrecks in October 1881
- List of shipwrecks in April 1887
- List of shipwrecks in January 1888
- Haplogroup E-M2
