= Scrammy Bay =

Natural bay in Newfoundland and Labrador, Canada

Coordinates: 52.700°N 55.831°W

Scrammy Bay is a natural bay on the coast of Labrador in the province of Newfoundland and Labrador, Canada. It is in the southeast reaches of St. Mary’s Bay to the east of lavander’s Arm.
