= Lyttelton Museum =

Museum in Lyttelton, New Zealand

Coordinates: 43.604°S 172.723°E

Lyttelton Museum is a museum in Lyttelton, New Zealand. It was opened in 1969 and has been closed since the 2010 and 2011 Christchurch earthquakes occurred. The museum building was demolished in 2012, and the museum is planning on moving into a new building in the future.

== History ==
Antarctic explorer Baden Norris founded the museum in 1969 and was the museum's curator until the 2010 and 2011 Christchurch earthquakes occurred. The museum first opened at Hawkhurst Road, and later moved to a council-owned building at 2 Gladstone Quay.

=== Canterbury earthquakes ===
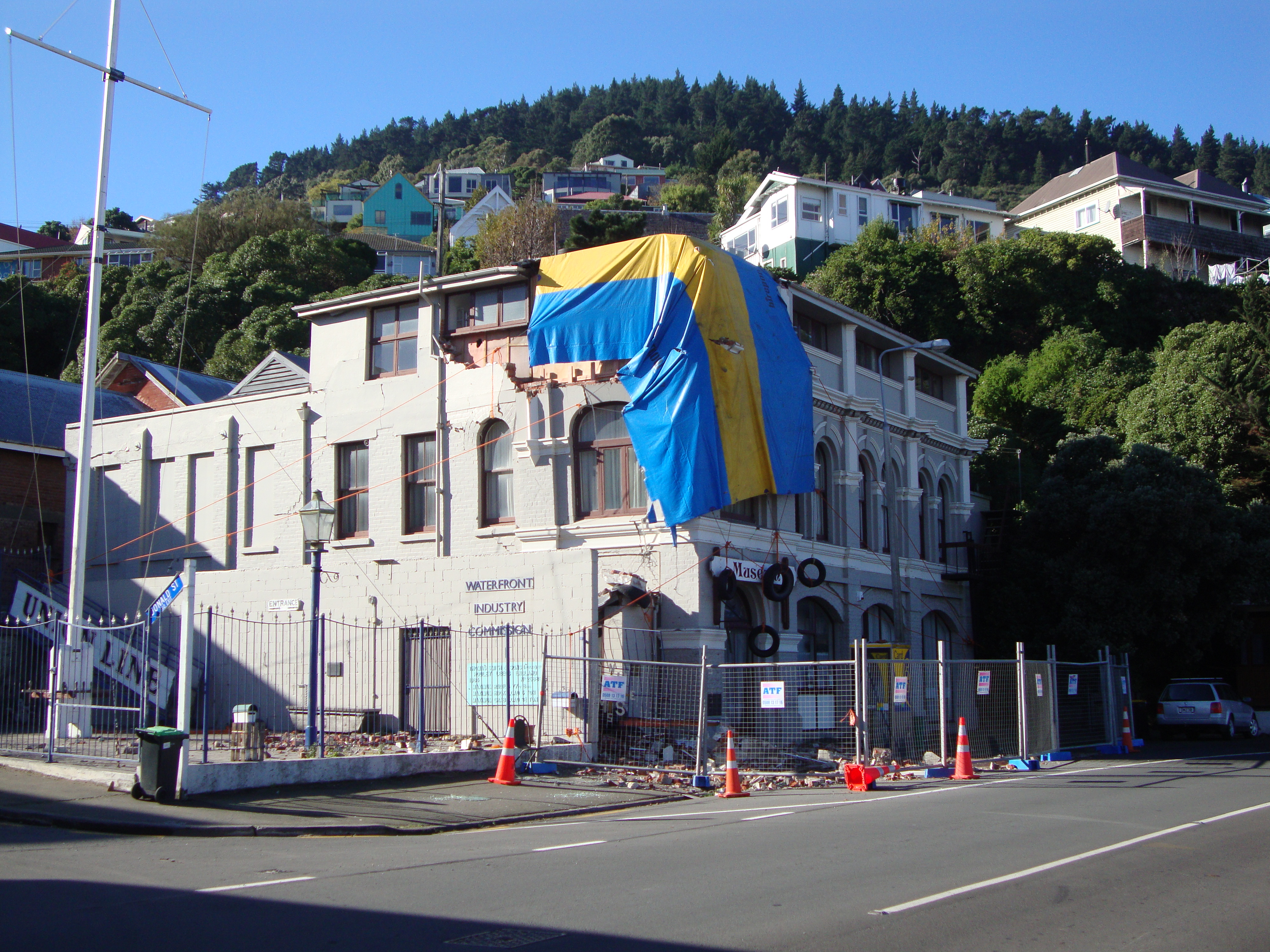
Earthquake-damaged museum building in May 2011

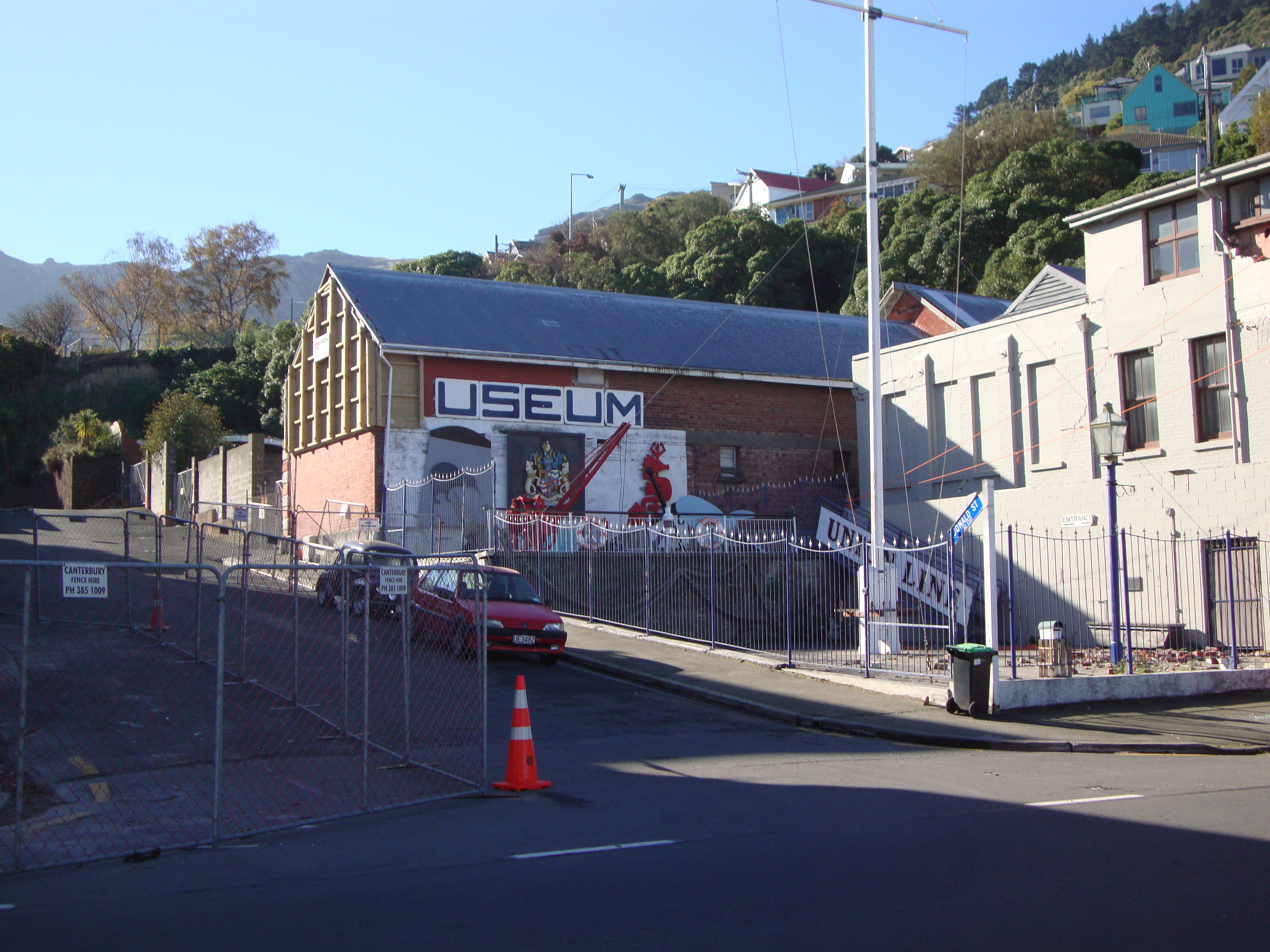
A quake-damaged museum building on Donald Street in May 2011

After the 2010 and 2011 Canterbury earthquakes occurred, the museum building was demolished in 2012 after being damaged. Of the museums collection, 95% of the items were saved and over 8,500 items were put in storage, with the Air Force Museum of New Zealand starting to hold most of the display items in 2011. A landslide in the 2013 New Zealand winter storm landed on a storage building and crushed it. In 2014 the museum held its first exhibition since the demolition of the 2 Gladstone Quay building.

The museum has been planning on using a new building. In 2017 the Christchurch City Council gave the museum society a spot at London Street. A resource consent was granted by the council in April 2023, three years after the initial application due to the building's design being modified to take into account feedback given by the council and other parties. In 2023 the museum said that they would need to raise $12.5 million for the build.

In 2017 it was reported that entry to the new museum would be free and would be open for six or seven days a week, which compares to the six hours a week the old museum was open for.

== Collection ==
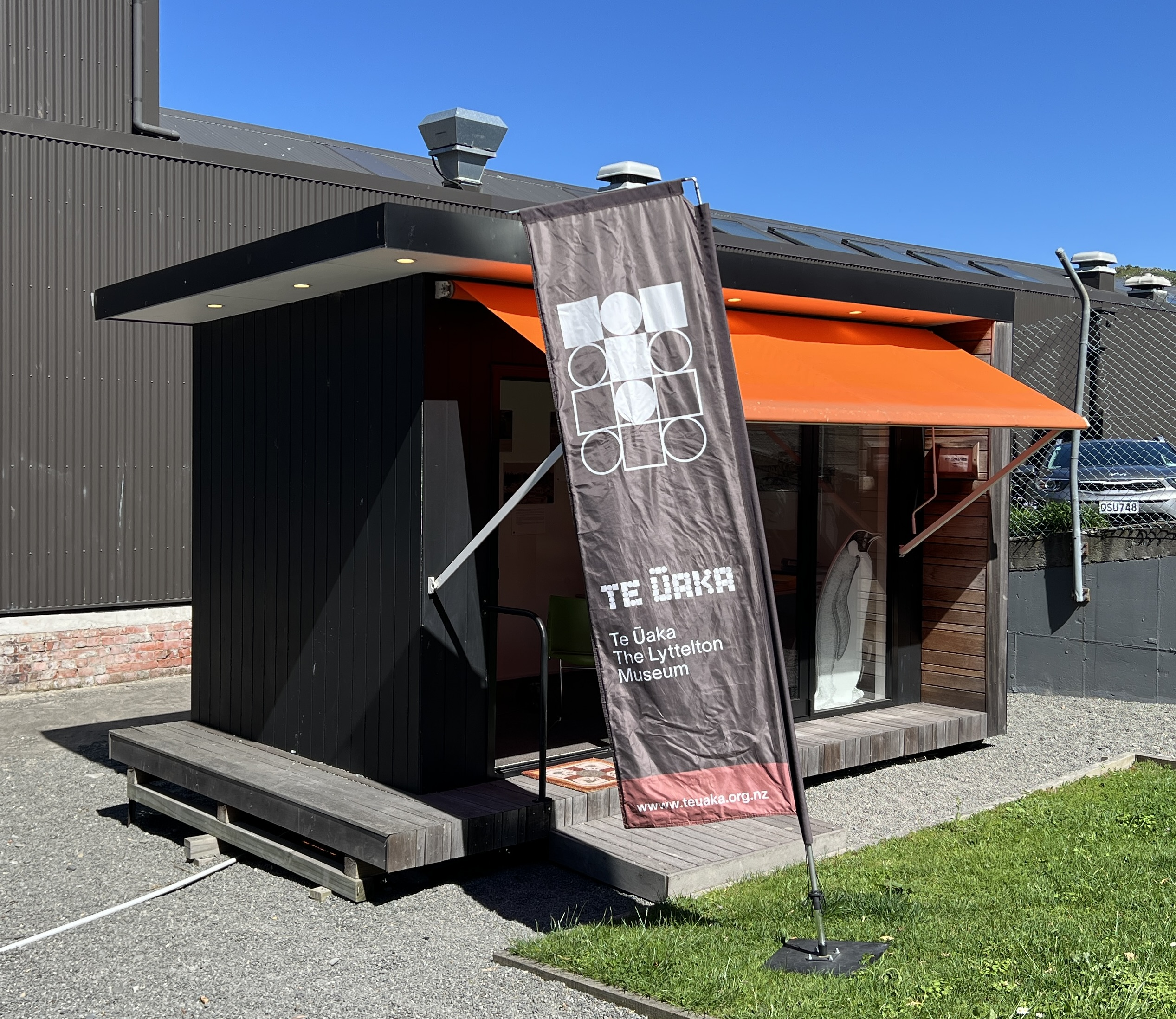
Cabin on future site of Te Ūaka Lyttelton Museum

The museum has over 20,000 items, with collections relating to Lyttelton and Antarctica.
