= Ekenäs, Kalmar =

Village in Kalmar Municipality, Sweden

Coordinates: 56.51°N 016.18°E

Ekenäs is a village in Kalmar Municipality, Sweden, situated on Kalmar Sound east of European route E22. It is the site of two traditional shipyards and a small yacht harbour. As of 2023 the village had a population of 166.
