= National Register of Historic Places listings in Beaufort County, South Carolina =

Location of Beaufort County in South Carolina

This is a list of the National Register of Historic Places listings in Beaufort County, South Carolina.

This is intended to be a complete list of the properties and districts on the National Register of Historic Places in Beaufort County, South Carolina, United States. The locations of National Register properties and districts for which the latitude and longitude coordinates are included below, may be seen on a map.

There are 77 properties and districts listed on the National Register in the county, including 5 National Historic Landmarks.

This National Park Service list is complete through NPS recent listings posted October 16, 2026.

== Current listings ==
	Name on the Register	Image	Date listed	Location	City or town	Description
1	Emanuel Alston House	Emanuel Alston House	October 6, 1988 (#88001723)	Secondary Road 161, 0.25 miles north of its junction with U.S. Route 21; 32°24′11″N 80°33′32″W	Frogmore	
2	Altamaha Town		January 21, 1994 (#93001479)	Address Restricted	Bluffton	
3	The Anchorage	The Anchorage	November 23, 1971 (#71000743)	1103 Bay St. 32°25′56″N 80°40′27″W	Beaufort	
4	Dr. York Bailey House	Dr. York Bailey House	October 6, 1988 (#88001726)	U.S. Route 21, approximately 0.2 miles east of its junction with Lands End Rd. 32°23′52″N 80°34′27″W	Frogmore	
5	William Barnwell House	William Barnwell House	March 24, 1971 (#71000744)	800 Prince St. 32°26′06″N 80°40′21″W	Beaufort	
6	Barnwell-Gough House	Barnwell-Gough House	November 15, 1972 (#72001191)	705 Washington St. 32°26′13″N 80°40′21″W	Beaufort	
7	Beaufort Historic District	Beaufort Historic District	December 17, 1969 (#69000159)	Bounded by the Beaufort River and Bladen, Hamar, and Boundary Sts. 32°26′08″N 80°40′04″W	Beaufort	
8	Beaufort National Cemetery	Beaufort National Cemetery	October 10, 1997 (#97001208)	1601 Boundary St. 32°25′55″N 80°40′49″W	Beaufort	
9	Bluffton Historic District	Bluffton Historic District	June 21, 1996 (#96000686)	Roughly bounded by the May River, Huger Cove, and Bridge St. 32°13′57″N 80°51′49″W	Bluffton	
10	Callawassie Sugar Works	Callawassie Sugar Works	May 27, 2014 (#13001096)	29 Sugar Mill Dr. 32°20′08″N 80°51′26″W	Okatie	
11	Camp Saxton Site		February 2, 1995 (#94001581)	Address Restricted	Port Royal	
12	Campbell Chapel AME Church	Campbell Chapel AME Church	April 26, 2019 (#100003688)	23 Boundary St. 32°14′11″N 80°51′39″W	Bluffton	
13	Charlesfort-Santa Elena Site	Charlesfort-Santa Elena Site	August 7, 1974 (#74001822)	South end of Belleau Wood Road; 32°18′23″N 80°40′32″W	Parris Island	
14	Cherry Hill School	Cherry Hill School	November 21, 2012 (#12000965)	210 Dillon Rd. 32°14′05″N 80°41′28″W	Hilton Head Island	
15	Chester Field		October 15, 1970 (#70000565)	Address Restricted	Laurel Bay	
16	Church of the Cross	Church of the Cross	May 29, 1975 (#75001686)	Calhoun St. 32°13′52″N 80°51′52″W	Bluffton	
17	Coffin Point Plantation	Coffin Point Plantation	August 28, 1975 (#75001687)	3 miles east of Frogmore at the northeastern end of Seaside Rd. on St. Helena Island; 32°25′58″N 80°28′32″W	Frogmore	
18	Coffin Point Plantation Caretaker's House	Coffin Point Plantation Caretaker's House	May 28, 1989 (#88001730)	Adjacent to Coffin Point Plantation, off Seaside Rd. 32°26′08″N 80°28′24″W	Frogmore	
19	The Corner Packing Shed	The Corner Packing Shed	October 6, 1988 (#88001733)	U.S. Route 21, west of its junction with Land's End Rd. 32°23′51″N 80°34′34″W	Frogmore	
20	The Corner Store and Office	The Corner Store and Office	October 6, 1988 (#88001737)	U.S. Route 21, west of its junction with Lands End Rd. 32°23′48″N 80°34′43″W	Frogmore	
21	John A. Cuthbert House	John A. Cuthbert House	June 13, 1972 (#72001192)	1203 Bay St. 32°25′57″N 80°40′32″W	Beaufort	
22	Daufuskie Island Historic District	Daufuskie Island Historic District	June 2, 1982 (#82003831)	Southwest of Hilton Head; 32°06′47″N 80°51′59″W	Hilton Head Island	
23	Eddings Point Community Praise House	Eddings Point Community Praise House	May 19, 1989 (#88001739)	On Secondary Road 183, 0.1 miles north of its junction with Secondary Road 74; 32°26′36″N 80°32′38″W	Frogmore	
24	Fish Haul Archaeological Site	Fish Haul Archaeological Site	June 30, 1988 (#88000976)	Address Restricted	Hilton Head Island	
25	Fort Frederick		December 31, 1974 (#74001826)	Address Restricted	Port Royal	The preserve is located adjacent to the grounds of Naval Hospital Beaufort. The South Carolina Department of Natural Resources constructed a gravel road to access the site in August of 2020.
26	Fort Fremont Battery	Fort Fremont Battery	May 5, 2010 (#88001821)	Bay Point Rd., 0.3 miles (0.48 km) from Land's End Rd. 32°18′22″N 80°38′32″W	Frogmore	Boundary increase approved May 6, 2021.
27	Fort Fremont Hospital	Fort Fremont Hospital	May 26, 1989 (#88001819)	0.3 miles from Land's End Rd. 32°18′29″N 80°38′37″W	Frogmore	
28	Fort Howell	Fort Howell	June 15, 2011 (#11000371)	North side of Beach City Rd. approximately 200 ft. southwest of the junction with Dillon Rd. 32°14′04″N 80°41′31″W	Hilton Head	Civil War earthwork fortification built in 1864 by the 32nd United States Colored Infantry Regiment and the 144th New York Infantry
29	Fort Lyttelton Site		September 13, 1979 (#79003322)	Address Restricted	Beaufort	
30	Fort Mitchell		June 5, 2017 (#100001036)	65 Skull Creek Dr. 32°14′36″N 80°44′37″W	Hilton Head	
31	Edgar Fripp Mausoleum, St. Helena Island Parish Church	Edgar Fripp Mausoleum, St. Helena Island Parish Church	October 6, 1988 (#88001743)	Secondary Road 45 near its junction with Secondary Road 37; 32°22′30″N 80°34′34″W	Frogmore	
32	Isaac Fripp House Ruins		October 6, 1988 (#88001750)	On an unpaved road, 1.1 miles west of its junction with Secondary Road 45; 32°20′37″N 80°38′25″W	Frogmore	
33	Frogmore Plantation Complex	Frogmore Plantation Complex	May 26, 1989 (#88001754)	Off Secondary Road 77 near its junction with Secondary Road 35; 32°21′32″N 80°33′40″W	Frogmore	
34	Green's Shell Enclosure		August 7, 1974 (#74001825)	Address Restricted	Hilton Head Island	
35	The Green	The Green	October 6, 1988 (#88001759)	Southeastern corner of the intersection of U.S. Route 21 and Lands End Rd. 32°23′46″N 80°34′37″W	Frogmore	
36	Hasell Point Site		August 14, 1973 (#73001675)	Address Restricted	Port Royal	
37	Hunting Island State Park Lighthouse	Hunting Island State Park Lighthouse	June 5, 1970 (#70000561)	17 miles south-southeast of Beaufort on U.S. Route 21; 32°22′32″N 80°26′16″W	Beaufort	
38	Indian Hill Site		March 22, 1974 (#74001827)	Address Restricted	St. Helena Island	
39	Mary Jenkins Community Praise House	Mary Jenkins Community Praise House	May 19, 1989 (#88001770)	On Secondary Road 74, 2.1 miles north of its junction with U.S. Route 21; 32°25′47″N 80°33′38″W	Frogmore	
40	Knights of Wise Men Lodge	Knights of Wise Men Lodge	April 12, 1996 (#96000408)	Martin Luther King Dr., south of its junction with U.S. Route 21; 32°23′43″N 80°33′58″W	St. Helena Island	
41	Lady's Island Bridge	Lady's Island Bridge	January 6, 2023 (#100008530)	US 21-Bus over Beaufort R. between Carteret St. and Sea Island Pkwy. 32°25′42″N 80°40′09″W	Beaufort	Now known as the Richard V. Woods Memorial Bridge.
42	Lands End Road Tabby Ruins		October 6, 1988 (#88001771)	Address Restricted	Frogmore	
43	Laurel Bay Plantation		February 27, 1997 (#97000095)	Address Restricted	Beaufort	
44	Little Barnwell Island		August 14, 1973 (#73001676)	North of Port Royal; 32°30′06″N 80°47′25″W	Port Royal	
45	Marshlands	Marshlands	November 7, 1973 (#73001674)	501 Pinckney St. 32°25′59″N 80°39′56″W	Beaufort	
46	McLeod Farmstead	McLeod Farmstead	July 25, 1997 (#97000776)	Seabrook Rd., 1 mile west of U.S. Route 21 and 10 miles north of Beaufort; 32°31′40″N 80°45′56″W	Seabrook	
47	Means-Gage House	Means-Gage House	October 15, 2020 (#100005675)	1207 Bay St. 32°25′57″N 80°40′33″W	Beaufort	
48	The Oaks		October 6, 1988 (#88001773)	On an unpaved road, 0.3 miles west of Secondary Road 165; 32°23′21″N 80°37′12″W	Frogmore	
49	Old Brass	Old Brass	June 3, 1976 (#76001693)	East of Yemassee on River Rd. 32°41′00″N 80°48′30″W	Yemassee	
50	Orange Grove Plantation		May 26, 1989 (#88001774)	Overlooking Wallace Creek, 0.25 mi. from South Carolina Highway 113; 32°22′13″N 80°36′14″W	Frogmore	
51	Parris Island Drydock and Commanding Generals House		November 21, 1978 (#78002492)	Mexico and Tripoli Sts. 32°21′00″N 80°40′18″W	Parris Island	
52	Penn Center Historic District	Penn Center Historic District	September 9, 1974 (#74001824)	South of Frogmore on South Carolina Highway 37; 32°23′16″N 80°34′44″W	Frogmore	
53	Pine Island Plantation Complex		May 26, 1989 (#88001775)	Pine Island; 32°26′25″N 80°30′38″W	Frogmore	
54	Pocosobo Town		January 21, 1994 (#93001480)	Address Restricted	Sheldon	
55	Port Royal School	Port Royal School	April 21, 2014 (#14000163)	1214 Paris Ave. 32°22′40″N 80°41′30″W	Port Royal	
56	Rear Lighthouse of Hilton Head Range Light Station	Rear Lighthouse of Hilton Head Range Light Station	December 12, 1985 (#85003349)	Arthur Hill Golf Course, Palmetto Dunes Resort off U.S. Route 278; 32°09′51″N 80°44′24″W	Hilton Head Island	
57	Riverside Plantation Tabby Ruins		October 6, 1988 (#88001776)	On an unpaved road., 0.4 miles west of Secondary Road 45 at Lands End; 32°18′57″N 80°38′38″W	Frogmore	
58	Rose Hill Plantation House	Rose Hill Plantation House	May 19, 1983 (#83002185)	Off U.S. Route 278; 32°17′42″N 80°52′31″W	Bluffton	
59	St. Helena Parish Chapel of Ease Ruins	St. Helena Parish Chapel of Ease Ruins	October 6, 1988 (#88001777)	Secondary Road 45, near its junction with Secondary Road 37; 32°22′31″N 80°34′36″W	Frogmore	
60	St. Helenaville Archaeological Site (38BU931)		October 6, 1988 (#88001778)	Address Restricted	Frogmore	
61	St. Luke's Church	St. Luke's Church	November 10, 1987 (#87001951)	South Carolina Highway 170; 32°16′24″N 80°57′00″W	Pritchardville	
62	St. Luke's Parish Zion Chapel of Ease Cemetery	St. Luke's Parish Zion Chapel of Ease Cemetery	October 5, 2017 (#100000727)	574 William Hilton Pkwy. 32°12′06″N 80°41′57″W	Hilton Head Island	
63	Sams Plantation Complex Tabby Ruins	Sams Plantation Complex Tabby Ruins	March 4, 2011 (#88001820)	Southern end of Dataw (Datha) Island near the intersection of Dataw Dr. and Dataw Club Rd., at Mink's Point near Jenkins Creek; 32°25′51″N 80°35′04″W	Frogmore	Ruins of late-18th/early-19th century tabby plantation complex; originally listed as "Sams Tabby Complex (38BU581)"
64	F.W. Scheper Store	F.W. Scheper Store	June 22, 2004 (#04000652)	918 8th St. 32°22′29″N 80°41′34″W	Port Royal	
65	Sea Pines		October 15, 1970 (#70000563)	Address Restricted	Hilton Head Island	A prehistoric shell midden on Hilton Head Island.
66	Seacoast Packing Company	Seacoast Packing Company	June 17, 2008 (#08000537)	100 Dill Dr. 32°25′24″N 80°41′33″W	Beaufort	
67	Seaside Plantation		July 16, 1979 (#79002375)	10 miles east of Beaufort on U.S. Route 21; 32°21′02″N 80°34′13″W	Beaufort	
68	Sheldon Church Ruins	Sheldon Church Ruins	October 22, 1970 (#70000562)	Northwest of Gardens Corner on Old Sheldon Church Road; 32°37′07″N 80°46′50″W	Gardens Corner	
69	Robert Simmons House		October 6, 1988 (#88001779)	On an unpaved road, 0.5 miles south of U.S. Route 21; 32°23′29″N 80°36′15″W	Frogmore	
70	Skull Creek		November 10, 1970 (#70000564)	Address Restricted	Hilton Head Island	
71	Robert Smalls House	Robert Smalls House	May 30, 1974 (#74001823)	511 Prince St. 32°26′07″N 80°40′06″W	Beaufort	
72	SS WILLIAM LAWRENCE Shipwreck Site		February 10, 1998 (#97000522)	Address Restricted	Hilton Head Island	
73	Stoney-Baynard Plantation	Stoney-Baynard Plantation	February 23, 1994 (#94000038)	Junction of Baynard Park Rd. and Plantation Dr. 32°07′44″N 80°48′53″W	Hilton Head Island	
74	Tabby Manse	Tabby Manse	May 14, 1971 (#71000745)	1211 Bay St. 32°25′58″N 80°40′35″W	Beaufort	
75	Tombee Plantation	Tombee Plantation	September 18, 1975 (#75001688)	South of Frogmore on St. Helena's Island; 32°18′31″N 80°37′25″W	Frogmore	
76	Union Church of Port Royal	Union Church of Port Royal	November 17, 2010 (#10000931)	1004 11th St. 32°22′37″N 80°41′35″W	Port Royal	
77	John Mark Verdier House	John Mark Verdier House	August 19, 1971 (#71000746)	801 Bay St. 32°25′50″N 80°40′16″W	Beaufort	

== See also ==
- List of National Historic Landmarks in South Carolina
- National Register of Historic Places listings in South Carolina
