= Datha =

Datha may refer to:

== Places ==
- Datha State, a non-salute Rajput princely state and its seat on the Bagad river in Kathiawar, Gujarat, India
- Datha island in Beaufort County, South Carolina, site of Sams Plantation Complex Tabby Ruins

== Persons ==
- a paramount native Indian chief of Cofitachequi in South Carolina, named by Spanish explorer Francisco de Chicora; cfr. the above island

== Religion ==
- one of eight theerthas at the Jharasangam Shiva temple

== Fiction ==
- Datha-giri alias Yawana, the Burmese equivalent of Ravana in the Ramayana
