= Riverside Plantation Tabby Ruins =

Archaeological site in South Carolina, United States

- U.S. National Register of Historic Places
- Location within South Carolina Location within the United States
- Location: On an unpaved road., 0.4 miles west of Secondary Road 45 at Lands End, Frogmore, South Carolina
- Coordinates: 32°18′57″N 80°38′38″W
- Area: 3.2 acres (1.3 ha)
- MPS: Historic Resources of St. Helena Island c. 1740-c. 1935 MPS
- NRHP reference No.: 88001776
- Added to NRHP: October 6, 1988

Riverside Plantation Tabby Ruins is a historic archeological site located on Saint Helena Island near Frogmore, Beaufort County, South Carolina. The ruins are significant as an example of early- to mid-19th century tabby construction. The ruins are the remains of an outbuilding associated with the Riverside Plantation and have great archaeological potential.

It was listed in the National Register of Historic Places in 1988.
