= Coffin Point Plantation Caretaker's House =

Historic house in South Carolina, United States

- U.S. National Register of Historic Places
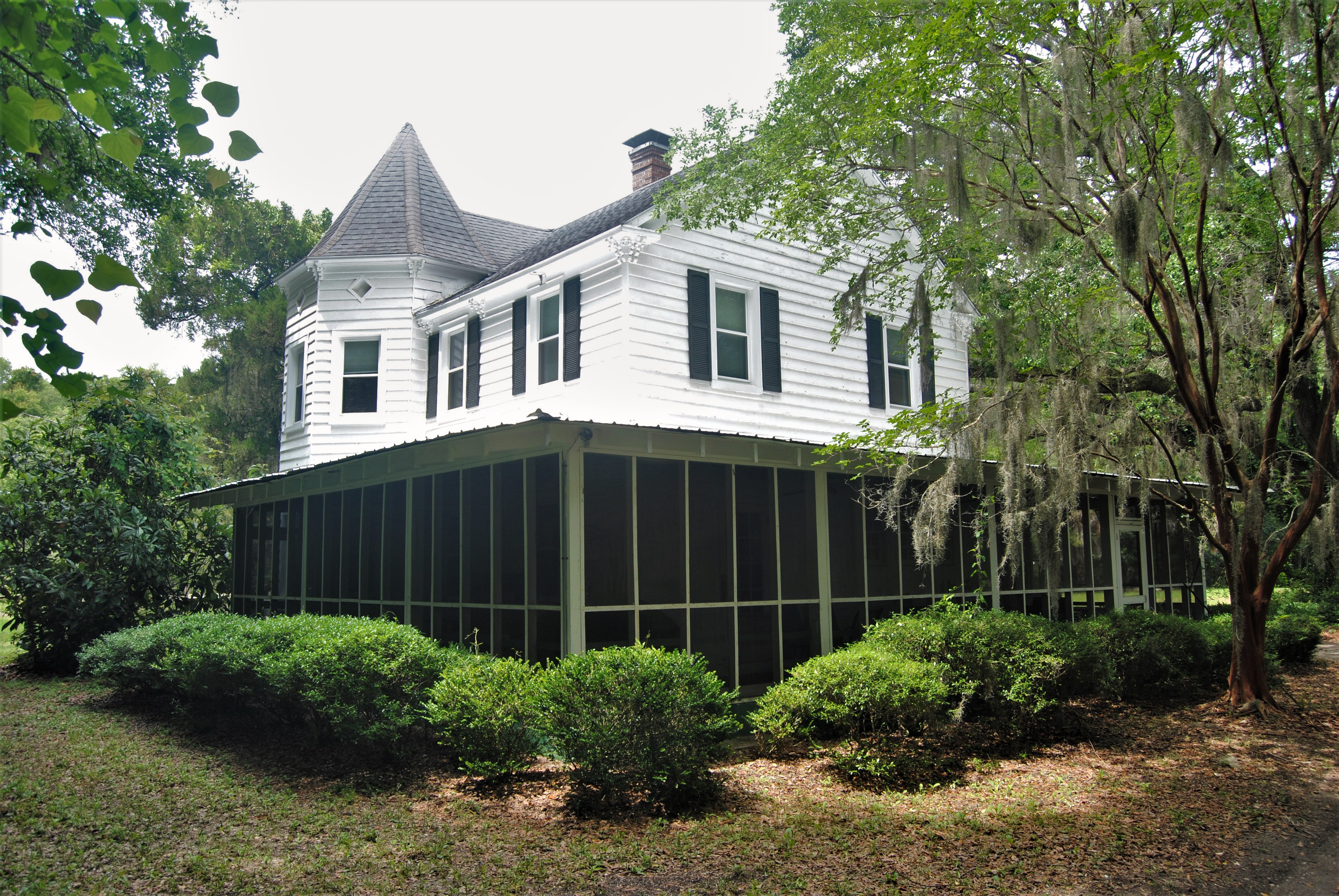

- Location within South Carolina Location within the United States
- Nearest city: Frogmore, South Carolina
- Coordinates: 32°26′8″N 80°28′24″W
- Area: 2 acres (0.81 ha)
- Built: 1892
- Architectural style: Queen Anne
- MPS: Historic Resources of St. Helena Island c. 1740-c. 1935 MPS
- NRHP reference No.: 88001730
- Added to NRHP: May 28, 1989

The Coffin Point Plantation Caretaker's House, located in the Frogmore area of Beaufort County, South Carolina and in the shadows of the nearby Coffin Point Plantation, was built in 1892 as a residence for the plantation's caretaker. The Queen Anne style of architecture is considered marginally interesting, but it is noteworthy in that it is the only home known at this time that employed this style. During this era in the plantation's history, the site primary dwelling was owned by James Donald Cameron, who was the Secretary of War under Ulysses S. Grant, and later, United States Senator from 1877 to 1897. The Coffin Point Plantation Caretaker's House was listed in the National Register of Historic Places on May 26, 1989.
