= Pine Island Plantation Complex =

Historic house in South Carolina, United States

- U.S. National Register of Historic Places
- U.S. Historic district
- Location within South Carolina Location within the United States
- Location: Pine Island, near Frogmore, South Carolina
- Coordinates: 32°26′25″N 80°30′38″W
- Area: 1 acre (0.40 ha)
- Built: c. 1904, c. 1928, c. 1936
- MPS: Historic Resources of St. Helena Island c. 1740-c. 1935 MPS
- NRHP reference No.: 88001775
- Added to NRHP: May 26, 1989

Pine Island Plantation Complex is a historic hunting plantation complex and national historic district located on Pine Island near Frogmore, Beaufort County, South Carolina. The district encompasses six contributing buildings and one contributing sites, and is an early-20th century hunting plantation. The main house at Pine Island was built about 1904, and is a two-story frame structure built on an existing tabby foundation. The front façade features a full-width two-story porch. Also on the property are the contributing cottage (c. 1915), a toolshed/doghouse (c. 1904), a barn (c. 1936), a pumphouse (c. 1928), an automobile garage (c. 1928), and causeway (c. 1904).

It was listed in the National Register of Historic Places in 1989.
