= Lands End Road Tabby Ruins =

Archaeological site in South Carolina, United States

- U.S. National Register of Historic Places
- Nearest city: Frogmore, South Carolina
- Area: 6.3 acres (2.5 ha)
- MPS: Historic Resources of St. Helena Island c. 1740-c. 1935 MPS
- NRHP reference No.: 88001771
- Added to NRHP: October 6, 1988

Lands End Road Tabby Ruins is a historic archeological site located on Saint Helena Island near Frogmore, South Carolina, US. The site contains the archaeological remains of a large late-18th to early-19th century house. The site has a tabby foundation pier and the partial outlines of a structure.

It was listed in the National Register of Historic Places in 1988.
