= Orange Grove Plantation (Saint Helena Island, South Carolina) =

Historic house in South Carolina, United States

- U.S. National Register of Historic Places
- U.S. Historic district
- Location within South Carolina Location within the United States
- Location: Overlooking Wallace Creek, 0.25 mi. from South Carolina Highway 113, near Frogmore, South Carolina
- Coordinates: 32°22′13″N 80°36′14″W
- Area: 5.7 acres (2.3 ha)
- Built: c. 1800, 1928
- Architectural style: Central passage 4-over-4
- MPS: Historic Resources of St. Helena Island c. 1740-c. 1935 MPS
- NRHP reference No.: 88001774
- Added to NRHP: May 26, 1989

Orange Grove Plantation is a historic plantation house and national historic district located on Saint Helena Island near Frogmore, Beaufort County, South Carolina. The district encompasses one contributing building and two contributing sites, and reflects the early-20th century influx of Northerners onto St. Helena Island. The plantation was first recorded in 1753 when Peter Perry purchased 473 acres. Perry owned 46 chattel slaves. The plantation house, built about 1800, was in poor condition when Henry L. Bowles (1866-1932), a U.S. Representative from Massachusetts, bought the property in 1928. He demolished it and built the present house in the same year. The property also includes the tabby ruin of the kitchen, built about 1800, and a tabby-walled cemetery containing three early-19th century graves of the Fripp and Perry families.

It was listed in the National Register of Historic Places in 1989.
