= Parish Church of St. Helena =

Historic Anglican church in Beaufort, South Carolina, United States

Coordinates: 32°26′03″N 80°40′29″W

The Parish Church of St. Helena
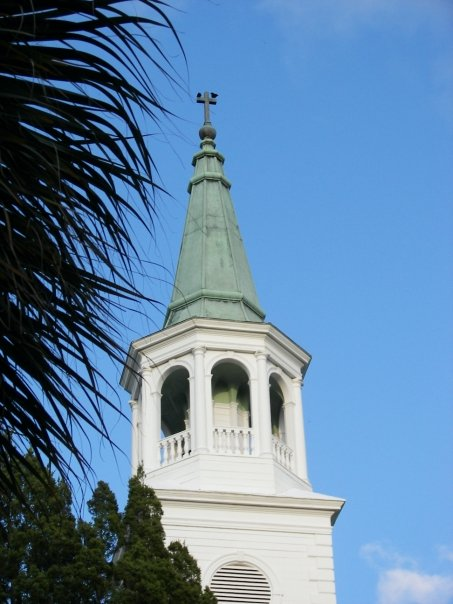
- Location: Beaufort, South Carolina
- Country: United States
- Denomination: Anglican Church in North America
- Website: sthelenas1712.org

History
- Founded: 1712
- Dedicated: 1724

Architecture
- Style: Georgian/Federal

Administration
- Diocese: South Carolina

Clergy
- Rector: The Rev. Samuel Porcher "Shay" Gaillard IV
- Parish Church of St. Helena
- U.S. Historic district – Contributing property
- Part of: Beaufort Historic District (ID69000159)
- Added to NRHP: December 17, 1969

The Parish Church of St. Helena is a historic Anglican church in Beaufort, South Carolina. Founded in 1712, it is among the oldest churches in the United States. Its building—erected in 1724 but expanded and substantially modified in the 19th century—is among the oldest continuously used church buildings in the United States. The church is a contributing property to the Beaufort Historic District, and the broader parish encompasses several sites listed on the National Register of Historic Places in Beaufort County.

== History ==
An act of South Carolina Assembly established the Parish of St. Helena on June 17, 1712, just two years after the founding of Beaufort. In the town plan, land north of Duke Street was set aside as glebe land for the parish, and under colonial law the parish vestry had the power to tax and hold elections. The first minister was the Rev. William Guy, a missionary of the Society for the Propagation of the Gospel in Foreign Parts. However, construction on the first church was slow, with conflict between colonists and the Yamasee erupting into war in 1715. By the 1720s, £1,200 had been raised toward a church and parsonage, and construction was finished around 1724. In 1740, the parish added a chapel of ease on St. Helena Island for the convenience of planters there; the chapel remained until it burned in 1886, and its ruins are today listed separately on the National Register.

The church was expanded several times in subsequent years, with waves of reconstruction and renovation being completed in 1769 and 1842. St. Helena's Church experienced only minor damage during the Revolutionary War but suffered neglect following disestablishment until the 1820s. In 1823, the Rev. Joseph Walker began a 55-year rectorate. In 1831, St. Helena's was a hub for the Beaufort Revival late in the Second Great Awakening. The Rev. Daniel Baker, the minister at Independent Presbyterian Church in Savannah, was invited by Walker to preach at St. Helena's since there was no Presbyterian church yet in Beaufort. Baker preached two or three times daily at St. Helena's for ten days. William J. Grayson, a newspaper editor and future member of Congress who was converted during the revival, described the scene thus:

The congregations increased daily; the whole community, laying aside their avocations, gave themselves up to the religious services. The word was "with power," whenever and by whomsoever preached. The consciences of sinners were aroused. The hearts of God’s people were moved to earnest, prevailing intercession. Every day brought accessions to the ranks of those who ‘mourned for sin.’ Every day witnessed the joy of those who exchanged tears of sorrow for smiles of happiness in attaining a hope of salvation. The voice of praise and thanksgiving burst forth from lips unused to the worship of God. The scoffer knelt down in the church to pray. The proud formalist wept over his sins, and sought the intercessions of his friends. The gambler left his cards, and the convivialist his bottle, and "went with the multitude to the house of God." The interval between the public services was spent in prayer in private houses, in conference with the ministers, and in religious conversation. The consciousness of eternity seemed impressed upon every individual. "The Spirit of God moved upon the face of the" community. A holy atmosphere pervaded the town, and affected the entire population to a degree unparalleled, save in the revival described by President Edwards, at Northampton, in 1735.

It is difficult to convey an idea of the feeling which characterized the religious assemblies. It was not noisy, like the brawling brook; but deep, still, solemn, like the mighty river. Once, at the close of an evening service, when the congregation seemed to drink in the preached gospel, the minister invited those who desired the prayers of their brethren to kneel around the chancel. There was a momentary pause in. the church, when, simultaneously, every pew door appeared to fly open; and not the chancel only, but the aisles also, were thronged with a kneeling multitude, in solemn silence, "waiting for the moving of the waters." God was manifestly present "in the assemblies of his saints." The truths of the gospel were realized as they never had been before, and the "people believed in the Lord," and gave glory to his name.

But what were the effects of this deep feeling. Most of our readers have probably seen enough of the transient influence of "revivals," so called, to distrust the results of religious excitement. But the "fruits" of this movement remain, and are obvious at the present day. As the whole population felt the divine impulse, some, doubtless, did not obey; but the great majority became consistent and useful Christians, filling many stations of honour and influence in the church and in the world.

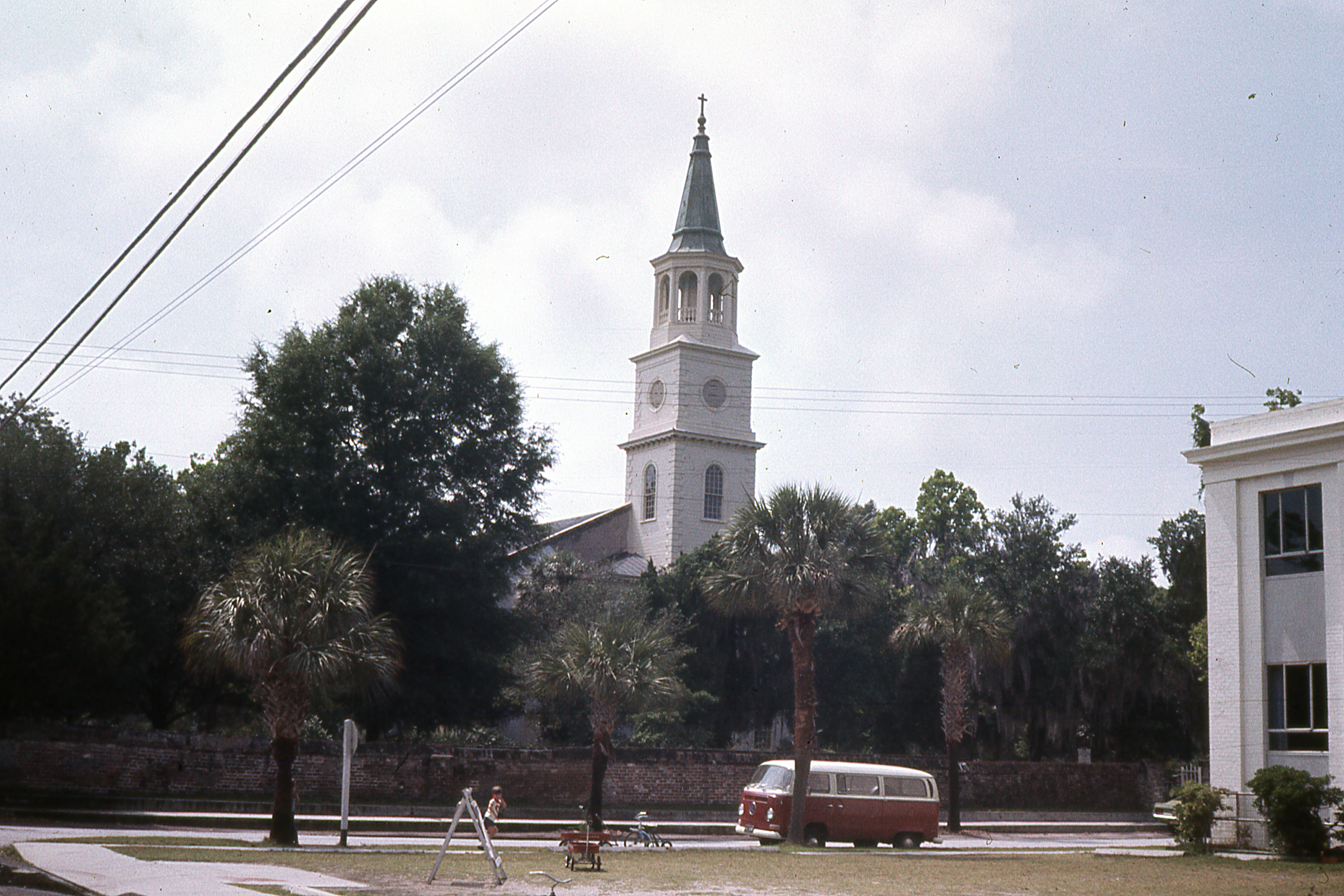
St. Helena's as seen in 1972.

As a result of the revival, 40 men entered ordained ministry, six of whom became Episcopal bishops, including Stephen Elliott, the first bishop of Georgia, as well a future prominent Baptist minister, Richard Fuller. St. Helena's doubled in attendance and outgrew its building; Walker presided over a major expansion in 1842 that saw the addition of galleries in the church. During the Civil War, the church was used as a hospital.

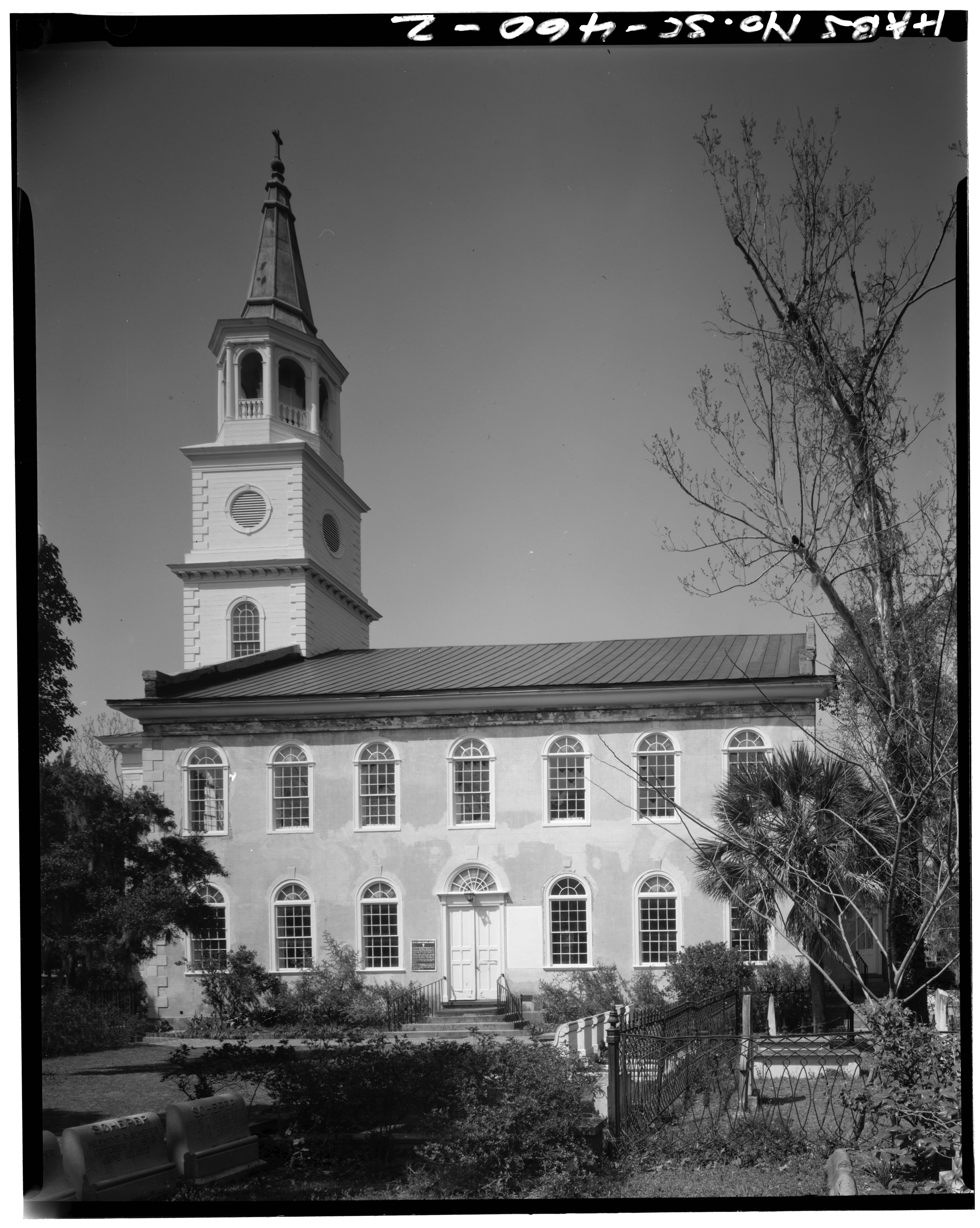
The south side of St. Helena's church.

In the early 21st century, as part of the Anglican realignment, St. Helena's Church remained affiliated with the Diocese of South Carolina when it disaffiliated from the Episcopal Church. After litigation, St. Helena's Church was one of the congregations permitted to keep its property, although the diocese was forced to rename itself as the Anglican Diocese of South Carolina. The congregation and diocese have been part of the Anglican Church in North America since 2015.

== Architecture ==
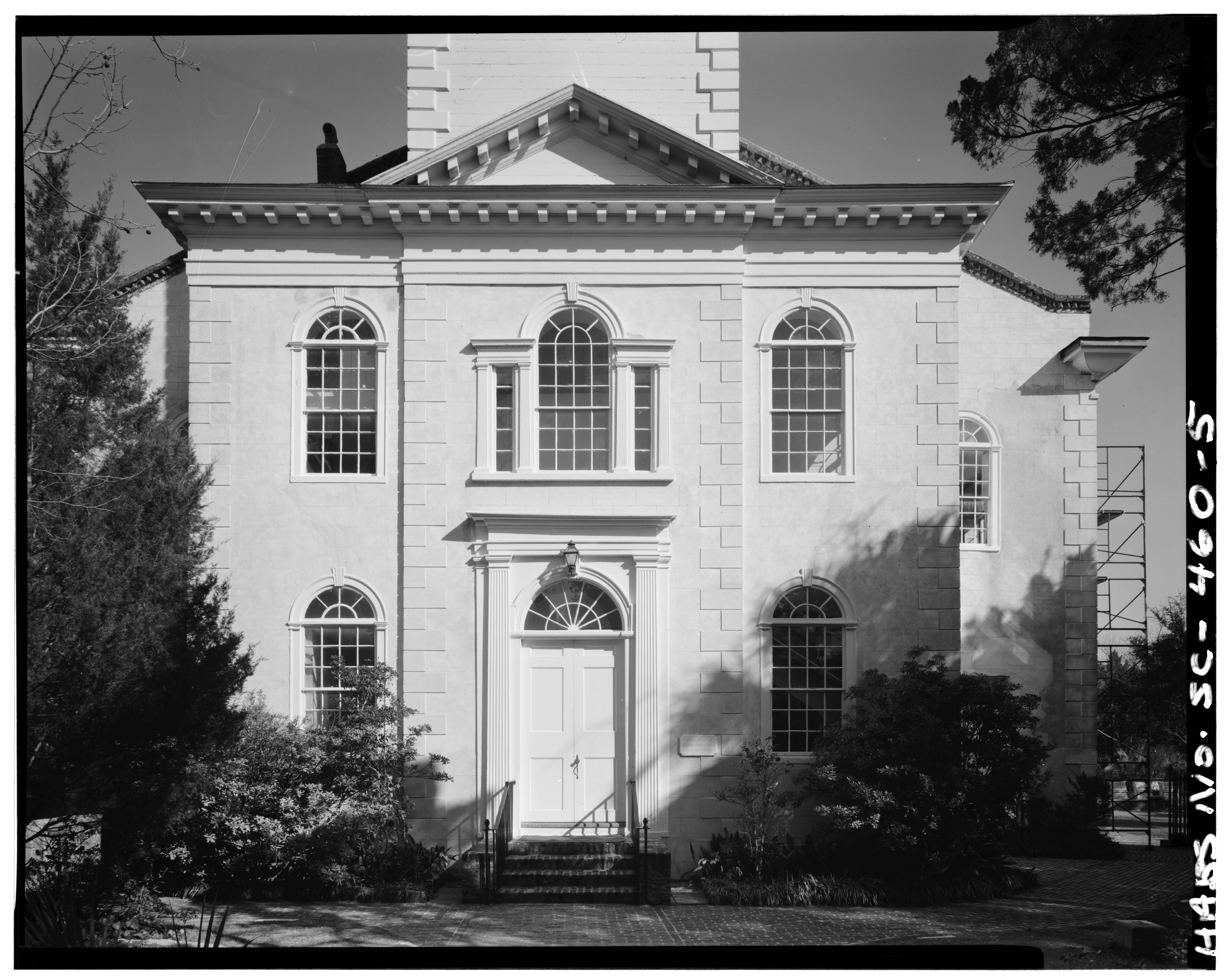
The Federal style west end of St. Helena's.

St. Helena's Church is considered emblematic of colonial Georgian architecture, with its west facade representing the Federal style in particular.

The church's prominent west end steeple was added in 1942 to a period design by Albert Simons. The church did not have a steeple between 1817 and 1942 and likely not before. An adjacent parish house was built in 1962.

== Graveyard ==
The historic church sits in St. Helena's Old Church Yard, which was also dedicated in 1724. Notable interments in the graveyard include early Beaufort colonist John "Tuscarora Jack" Barnwell, his grandson and South Carolina militia general John Barnwell, and Confederate Army generals Richard H. Anderson and Stephen Elliott Jr.

== Ministries ==
St. Helena's currently holds weekly services in the historic sanctuary, in the parish hall, on Fripp Island and at Habersham, a planned community west of Beaufort. Since 1925, St. Helena's has held an annual service at the NRHP-listed Old Sheldon Church ruins.
