= St. Helenaville Archaeological Site =

Archaeological site in South Carolina, United States

- St. Helenaville Archaeological Site (38BU931)
- U.S. National Register of Historic Places
- Nearest city: Frogmore, South Carolina
- Area: 165.5 acres (67.0 ha)
- MPS: Historic Resources of St. Helena Island c. 1740-c. 1935 MPS
- NRHP reference No.: 88001778
- Added to NRHP: October 6, 1988

St. Helenaville Archaeological Site is a historic archeological site located on Saint Helena Island near Frogmore, Beaufort County, South Carolina. It was listed in the National Register of Historic Places in 1988.

St. Helenaville was a small antebellum village and summer retreat located on the northeastern end of St. Helena Island. St. Helenaville was damaged by several major storms, which ultimately caused part of the village to fall into the sound. There is very little historical documentation of the village. Several remains of tabby and brick are evident.
