= Laurel Bay Plantation =

Archaeological site in South Carolina, United States

- U.S. National Register of Historic Places
- Nearest city: Beaufort, South Carolina
- Area: 26.8 acres (10.8 ha)
- Built: 1779
- NRHP reference No.: 97000095
- Added to NRHP: February 27, 1997

Laurel Bay Plantation, also known as Woodward Plantation and Tabby Ruin Site, is a historic archaeological site located near Beaufort, Beaufort County, South Carolina. The site contains artifacts associated with domestic outbuilding activities related to either or both Laurel Bay Plantation (c. 1772–1779) and Woodward Plantation (c. 1800–1861). Features present at the site include sections of two tabby walls, a tabby structure foundation, two depressions, two brick piles, and a shell pile.

It was listed in the National Register of Historic Places in 1994.
