= Fort Mitchell (South Carolina) =

- Fort Mitchel
- U.S. National Register of Historic Places
- Location within South Carolina Location within the United States
- Location: 65 Skill Creek Dr., Hilton Head, South Carolina
- Coordinates: 32°14′36″N 80°44′37″W
- Built: 1861
- NRHP reference No.: 100001036
- Added to NRHP: June 5, 2017

Fort Mitchel is an American Civil War fortification at 65 Skull Creek Drive in Hilton Head, South Carolina.

== History ==
The fort was built in 1861 by Union Army forces as part of the defenses of a coaling station and ship maintenance facility at Seabrook Landing. It was named for Brigadier General Ormsby M. Mitchel, and is a rare surviving example of a semi-permanent fortification built by the Union in the South Carolina Low Country.

The fort site was listed on the National Register of Historic Places in 2017. Today, it is an historic site that is open to the public.

== See also ==
- National Register of Historic Places listings in Beaufort County, South Carolina
