= St. Luke's Parish Zion Chapel of Ease Cemetery =

Historic site in Beaufort County, South Carolina, US

- U.S. National Register of Historic Places
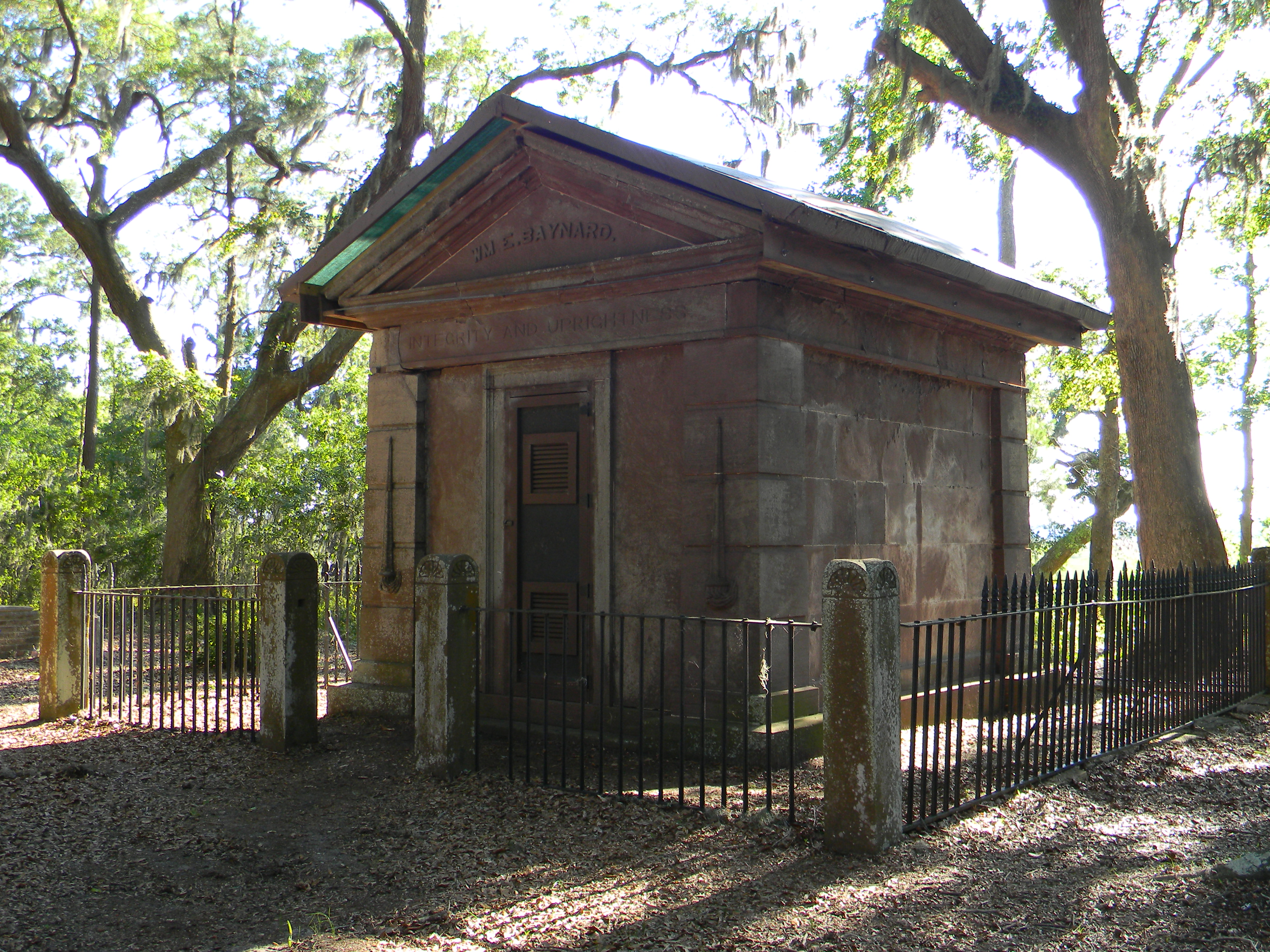

- Location within South Carolina Location within the United States
- Location: 574 William Hilton Pkwy., Hilton Head Island, South Carolina
- Coordinates: 32°12′6″N 80°41′57″W
- Built: 1846
- NRHP reference No.: 100000727
- Added to NRHP: October 05, 2017

St. Luke's Parish Zion Chapel of Ease Cemetery is a historic cemetery and chapel site at 574 William Hilton Parkway in Hilton Head Island, South Carolina. The cemetery was established in the 18th century, and includes a fine collection late 18th and early 19th century funerary art. It also includes the 1846 Baynard Mausoleum, believed to be the oldest surviving structure on the island. Somewhere on the property are the remains of the St. Luke's Chapel, which was destroyed in the 1860s.

The cemetery was listed on the National Register of Historic Places in 2017.

== See also ==
- National Register of Historic Places listings in Beaufort County, South Carolina
