= Port Royal School =

- U.S. National Register of Historic Places
- Exterior, Port Royal School

- Location within South Carolina Location within the United States
- Location: 1214 Paris Ave., Port Royal, South Carolina
- Coordinates: 32°22′40″N 80°41′30″W
- Area: 4 acres (1.6 ha)
- Built: 1911
- Architectural style: Colonial Revival; Modern
- NRHP reference No.: 14000163
- Added to NRHP: April 21, 2014

The Port Royal School is a historic South Carolina school building. It is located at 1214 Paris Avenue in the town of Port Royal. Its original main block is a two-story Colonial Revival structure designed by Wilson and Sompayrac and built in 1911. In 1954 a single-story brick Modern addition was added to the north of this building; it was designed by William Harleston of Halsey & Cummings. A second addition was made in 2002, further extending the 1954 building to the north.

The building is believed to be the second-oldest active elementary school building in the state. It also contributed to the area's checkered history of the provision of so-called "separate but equal" educational facilities for whites and African Americans: the 1954 addition occurred at a time when the last elementary school for African Americans in Port Royal was closed, requiring the transportation of those students to Beaufort. The Port Royal School remained whites-only until 1964.

The school was listed in the National Register of Historic Places in 2014.

== See also ==
- National Register of Historic Places listings in Beaufort County, South Carolina
