= Fort Fremont Hospital =

- U.S. National Register of Historic Places
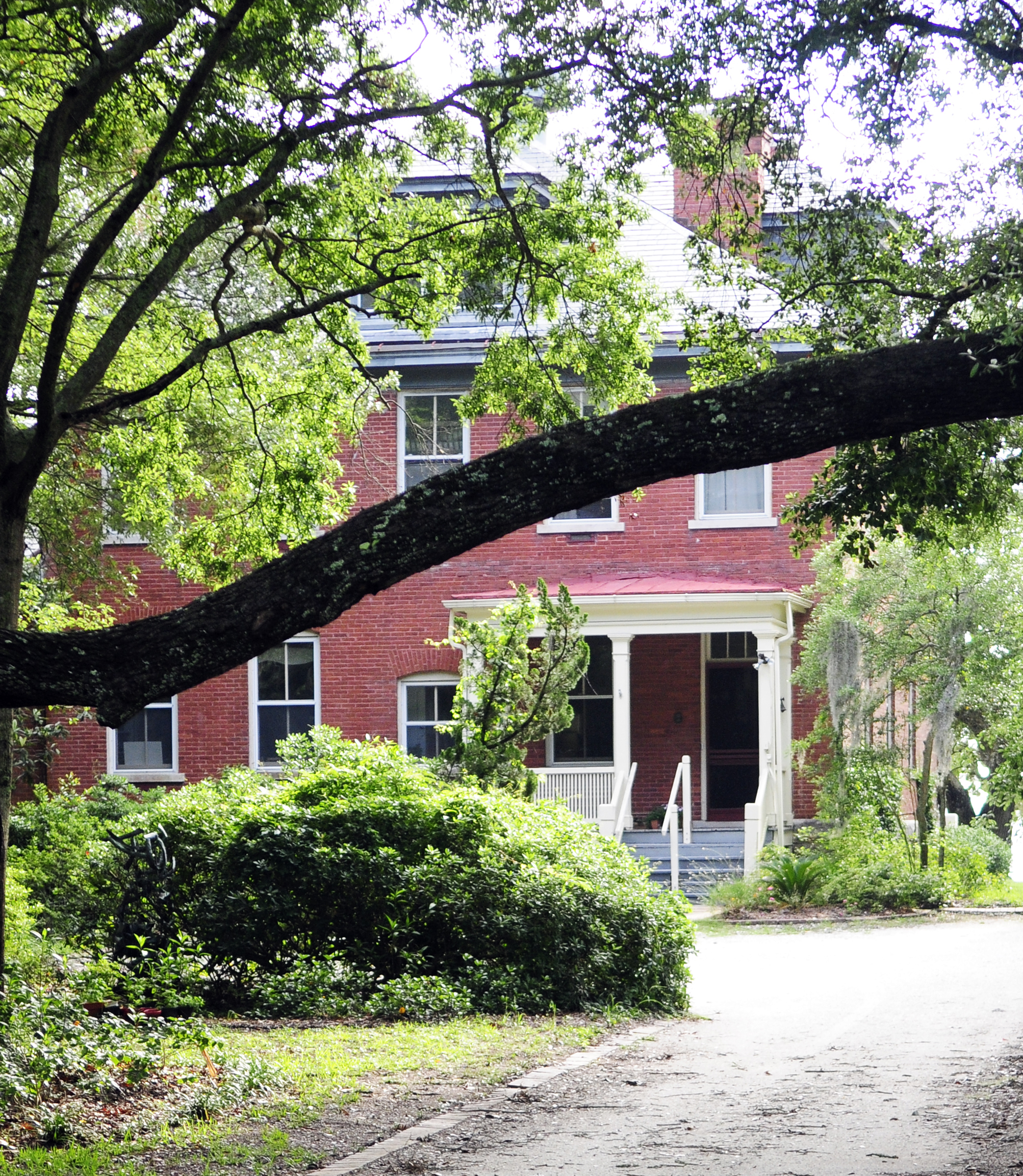

- Location within South Carolina Location within the United States
- Nearest city: Frogmore, South Carolina
- Coordinates: 32°18′29″N 80°38′37″W
- Area: 2.4 acres (0.97 ha)
- Built: 1906
- Built by: US Army Corps of Engineers
- Architectural style: Colonial Revival
- MPS: Historic Resources of St. Helena Island c. 1740-c. 1935 MPS
- NRHP reference No.: 88001819
- Added to NRHP: May 26, 1989

Fort Fremont Hospital, located in Beaufort County, South Carolina, is significant due to its association with the nearby fort. The Colonial Revival building was built around 1906 as a replacement for the original hospital for the garrison. The War Department planned to phase out the post at Fort Fremont Battery as early as 1906, the year that Fort Fremont Hospital was built. Since 1930, the year that the fort was decommissioned, the hospital has been privately owned. Fort Fremont Hospital was listed in the National Register of Historic Places on May 26, 1989.
