= Frogmore Plantation Complex =

- U.S. National Register of Historic Places
- U.S. Historic district
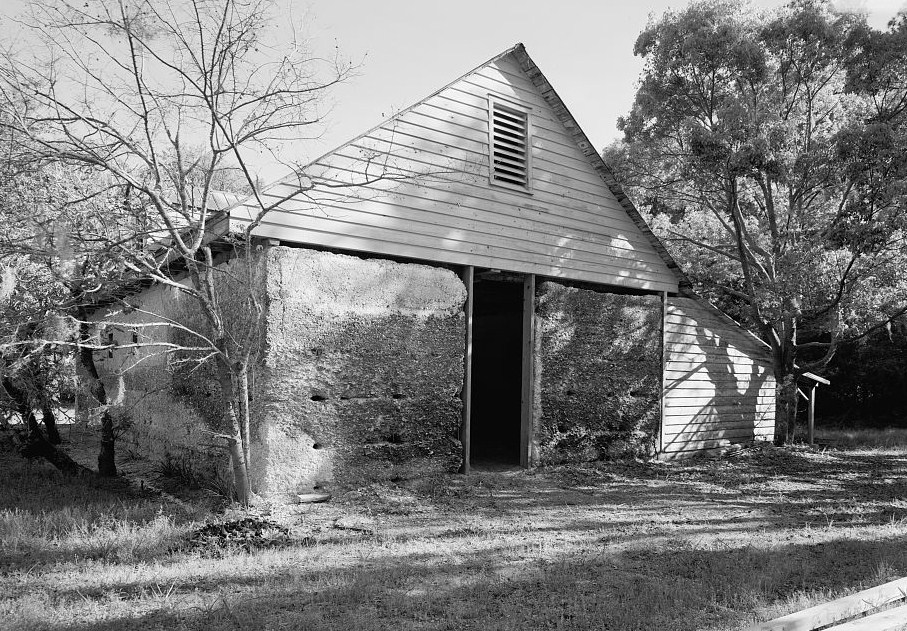
- Tabby Barn

- Location within South Carolina Location within the United States
- Location: Off Secondary Road 77 near its junction with Secondary Road 35, near Frogmore, South Carolina
- Coordinates: 32°21′32″N 80°33′40″W
- Area: 18.4 acres (7.4 ha)
- Built: 1920
- Architectural style: Central passage 4-over-4
- MPS: Historic Resources of St. Helena Island c. 1740-c. 1935 MPS
- NRHP reference No.: 88001754
- Added to NRHP: May 26, 1989

The Frogmore Plantation Complex, located on Saint Helena Island, in Beaufort County, South Carolina, is significant for several reasons. First, the plantation home, along with its contributing properties (i.e. pump house, barn, windmill/water tower), offers an excellent example of the area's architectural development from 1790 to 1920. Second, the plantation's long association with prominent families contributes to its significance. The plantation was first owned by Lieutenant Governor William Bull, who then willed it to his son in 1750.

After the Civil War, the house was purchased by two northern missionaries — Miss Laura Matilda Towne and Miss Ellen Murray — who founded the historic Penn School, located within the Penn Center. The Frogmore Plantation Complex was listed in the National Historic Register on May 26, 1989.
