= The Green (Frogmore, South Carolina) =

Archaeological site in South Carolina, United States

- U.S. National Register of Historic Places
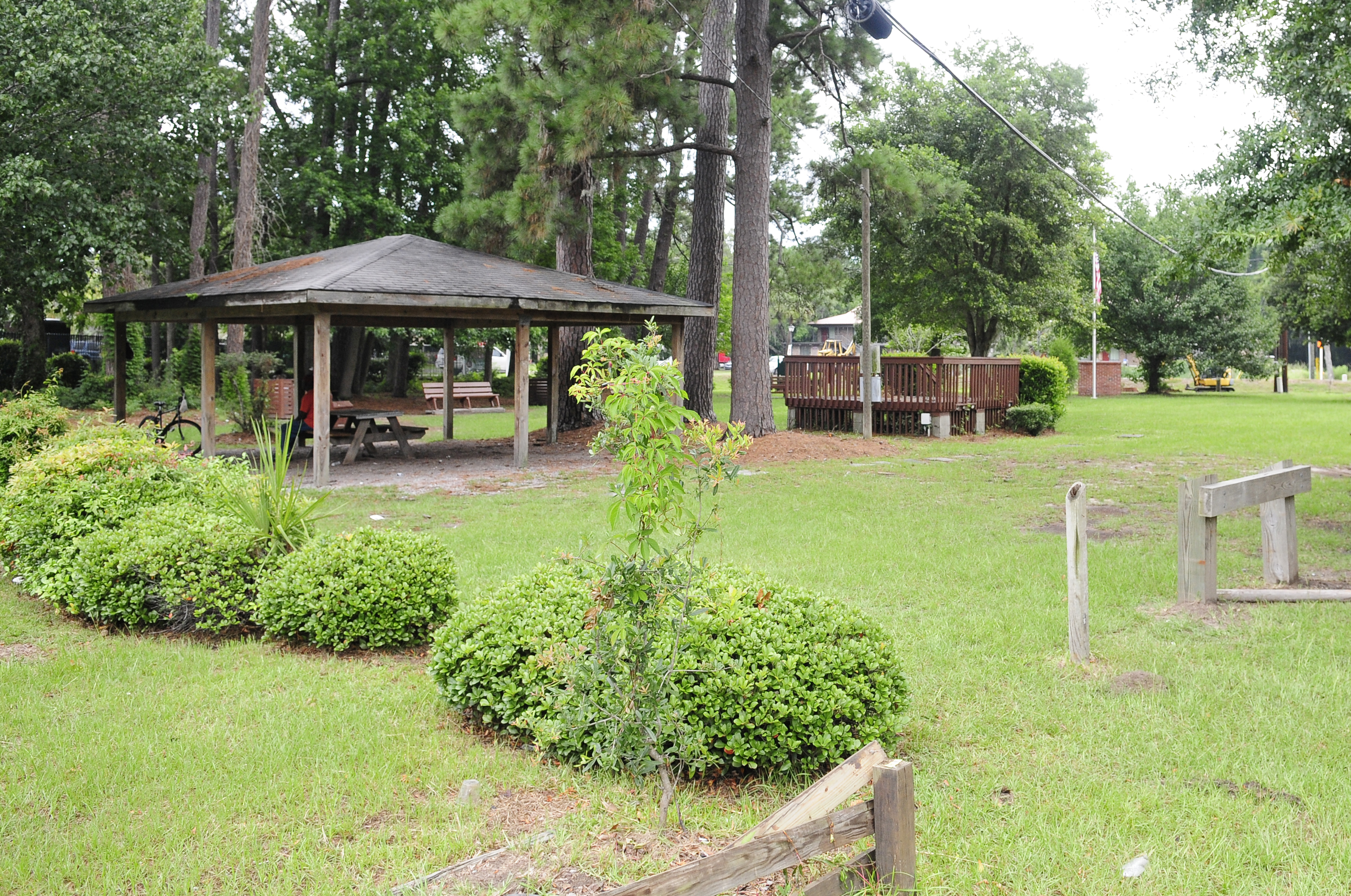
- The Green, June 2012

- Location within South Carolina Location within the United States
- Location: SE corner intersection of US Hwy. 21 and Lands End Rd., Frogmore, South Carolina
- Coordinates: 32°23′46″N 80°34′37″W
- Area: less than one acre
- Built: 1893
- MPS: Historic Resources of St. Helena Island c. 1740-c. 1935 MPS
- NRHP reference No.: 88001759
- Added to NRHP: October 6, 1988

The Green is a historic open-space located on Saint Helena Island near Frogmore, Beaufort County, South Carolina. It is the site of community meetings, celebrations, and other gatherings. It was listed in the National Register of Historic Places in 1988.

The Green was the site of the first Darrah Hall, an auditorium and community center built about 1885 by Penn School, and destroyed in 1893. Since that time the Green has continued to serve as a gathering place for the people of St. Helena Island. At the rear of The Green is the Knights of Wise Men Lodge.
