= Dr. York Bailey House =

Historic house in South Carolina, United States

- U.S. National Register of Historic Places
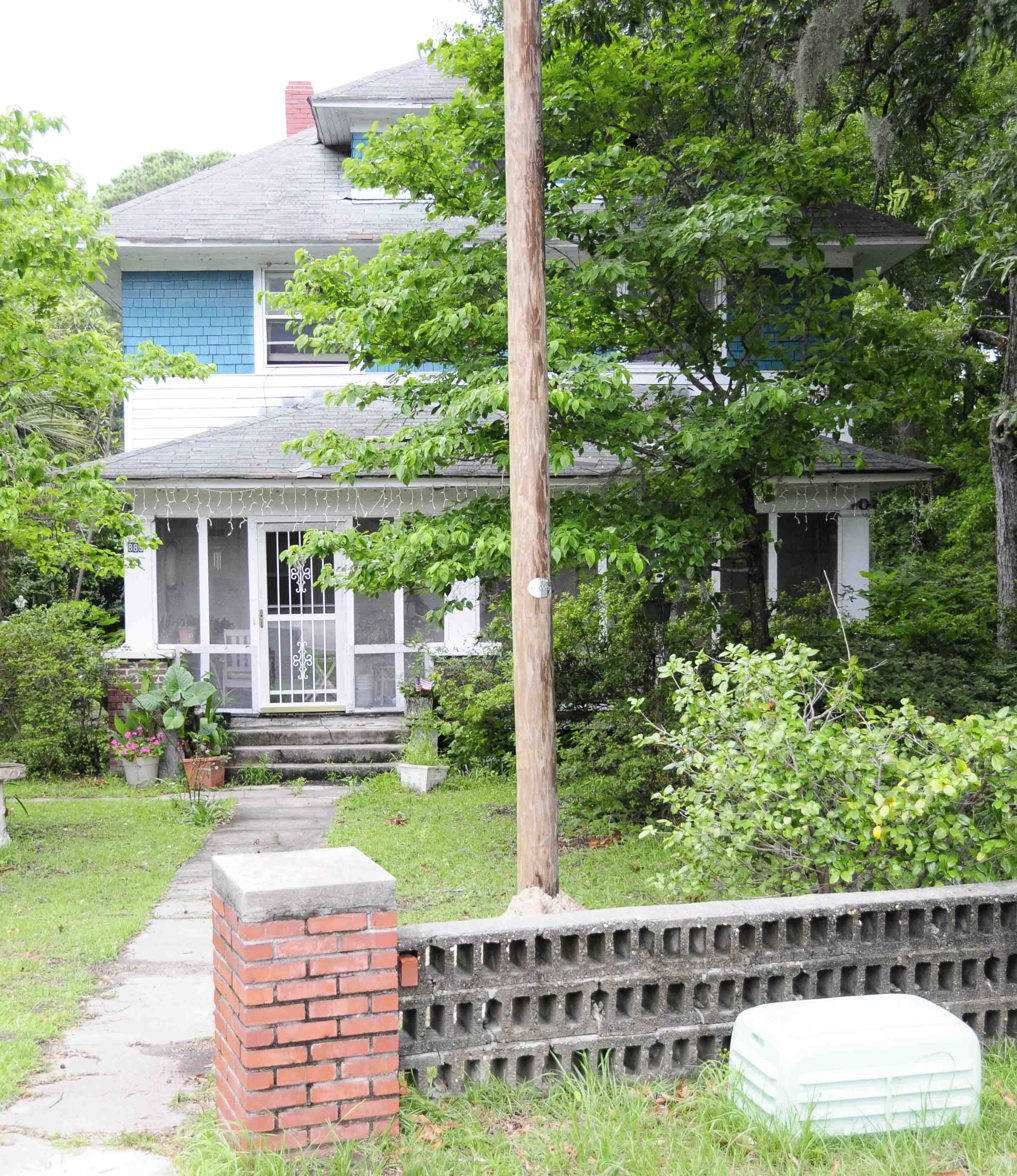
- Dr. York Bailey House, June 2012

- Location within South Carolina Location within the United States
- Location: US Hwy. 21, approx. .2 mi. E of jct. with Lands End Rd., Frogmore, South Carolina
- Coordinates: 32°23′52″N 80°34′27″W
- Area: less than one acre
- Built: c. 1915
- Architectural style: American Foursquare
- MPS: Historic Resources of St. Helena Island c. 1740-c. 1935 MPS
- NRHP reference No.: 88001726
- Added to NRHP: October 6, 1988

Dr. York Bailey House, also known as the Sara Rhodan House, is a historic home located on Saint Helena Island near Frogmore, Beaufort County, South Carolina. It was built about 1915, and is a two-story, vernacular frame American Foursquare style dwelling. It was built for Dr. York W. Bailey (1881-1971), a prominent native of the island who was St. Helena's first African-American doctor and only resident physician for over 50 years. He lived in this house until his death in 1971. The York W. Bailey Cultural Center and Museum at Penn Community Center is named for him.

The house was from a mail order catalogue.

It was listed in the National Register of Historic Places in 1988.
