= Datha princely state =

Town, former princely state in India

Datha is a town and former non-salute Rajput princely state on Saurashtra peninsula in Gujarat, Western India.

The village lies on the Bagad river, in Kathiawar.

== History ==
The princely state, in Gohelwar prant, was ruled by Sarvaiya Rajput Chieftains.

In 1901 it comprised 24 villages, covering 69 square km, with a population of 9,452, yielding 31,339 Rupees state revenue (1903–4, mostly from land), and paid 5,398 Rupees tribute, to the Gaikwar Baroda State and Junagadh State.

== External links and Sources ==
- Imperial Gazetteer, on DSAL.UChicago.edu - Kathiawar
