= Isaac Fripp House Ruins =

Historic ruin in South Carolina, United States

- U.S. National Register of Historic Places
- Location within South Carolina Location within the United States
- Location: On an unpaved road, 1.1 miles west of its junction with Secondary Road 45, Frogmore, South Carolina
- Coordinates: 32°20′37″N 80°38′25″W
- Area: 8.2 acres (3.3 ha)
- Built: c. 1800-1860
- MPS: Historic Resources of St. Helena Island c. 1740-c. 1935 MPS
- NRHP reference No.: 88001750
- Added to NRHP: October 6, 1988

Isaac Fripp House Ruins is a historic house ruin and archaeological site located on Saint Helena Island near Frogmore, Beaufort County, South Carolina. The ruins are located at Bay View overlooking the junction of Chowan Creek and the Beaufort River. The two-story, tabby house dates to the early- to mid-19th century. It is associated with Isaac Fripp, a planter of sea island cotton and other staples on St. Helena Island.

It was listed in the National Register of Historic Places in 1988.
