= St. Helena Parish Chapel of Ease Ruins =

- U.S. National Register of Historic Places
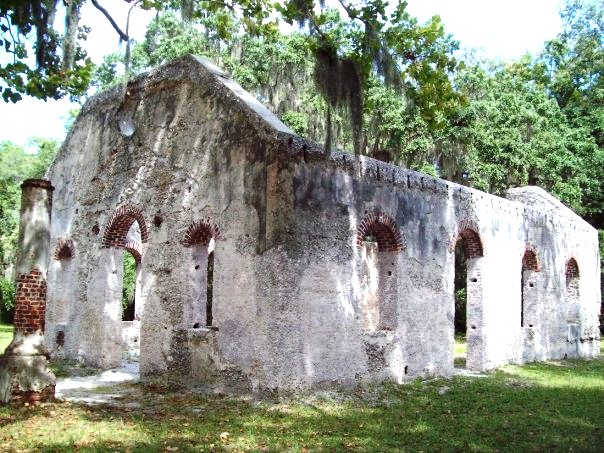

- Location within South Carolina Location within the United States
- Nearest city: Frogmore, South Carolina
- Coordinates: 32°22′31″N 80°34′36″W
- Area: 1.8 acres (0.73 ha)
- Built: 1740
- Architectural style: Colonial
- MPS: Historic Resources of St. Helena Island c. 1740-c. 1935 MPS
- NRHP reference No.: 88001777
- Added to NRHP: October 06, 1988

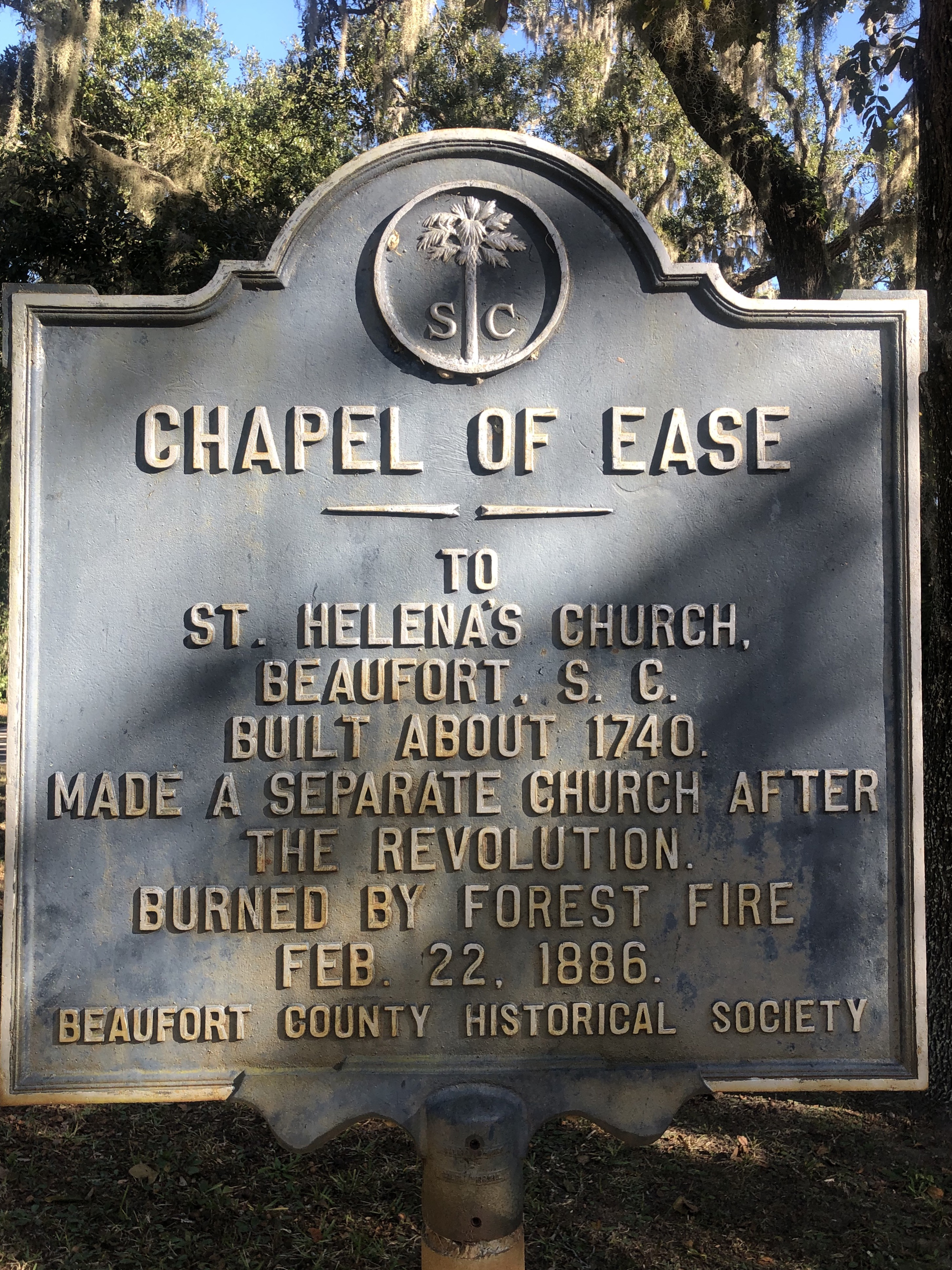
St. Helena Parish Chapel of Ease Ruins Plaque

St. Helena Parish Chapel of Ease Ruins is a historic site in Frogmore, South Carolina on Saint Helena Island.

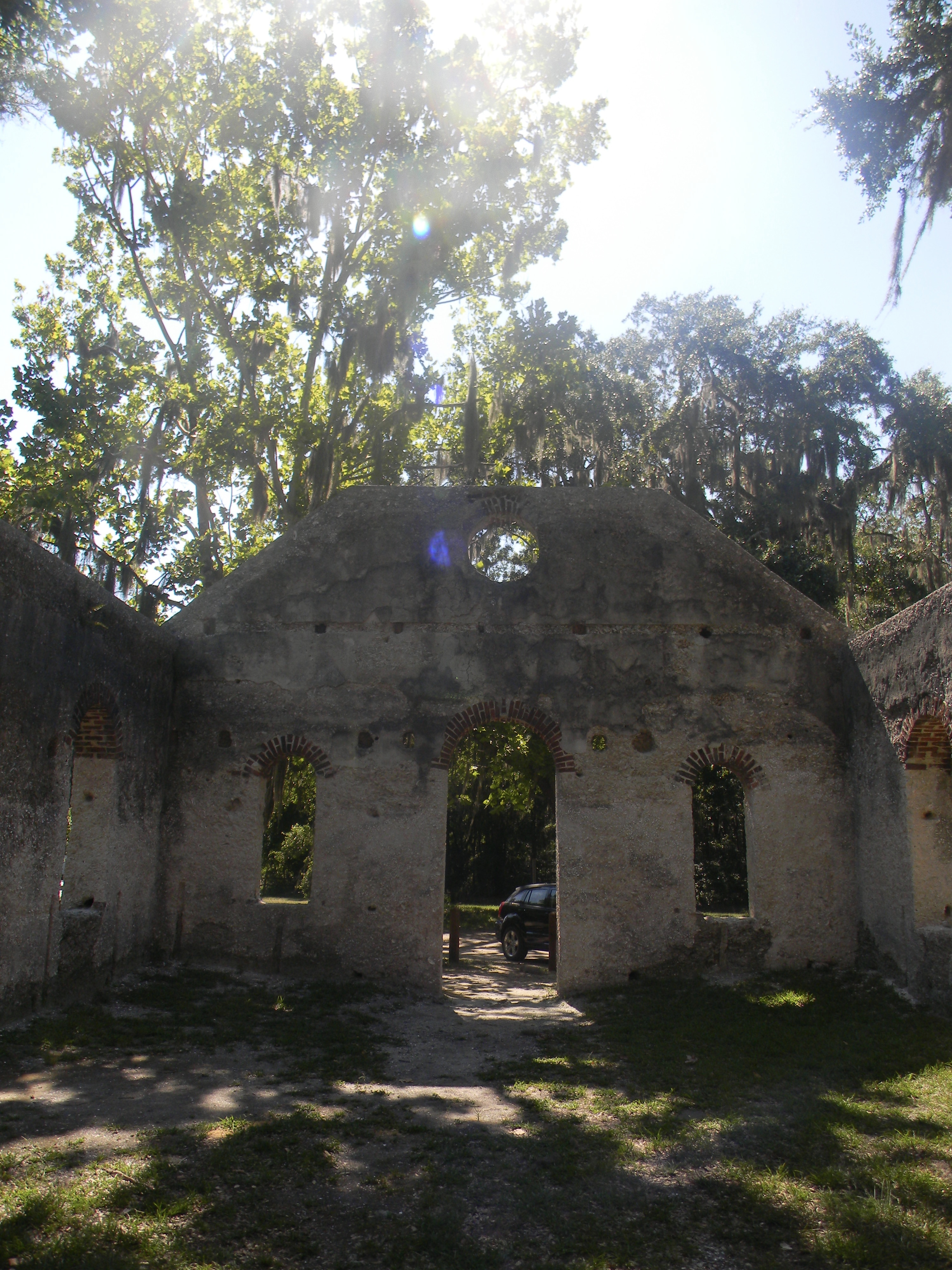
The front of the Chapel of Ease Ruins from the inside.

The Anglican chapel was constructed in 1740 by enslaved people on Saint Helena Island as a chapel of ease for parishioners who had difficulty traveling to worship at the Parish Church of St. Helena in Beaufort, South Carolina. The ruins were added to the National Register of Historic Places in 1988.
