= Tombee Plantation =

Historic house in South Carolina, United States

- U.S. National Register of Historic Places
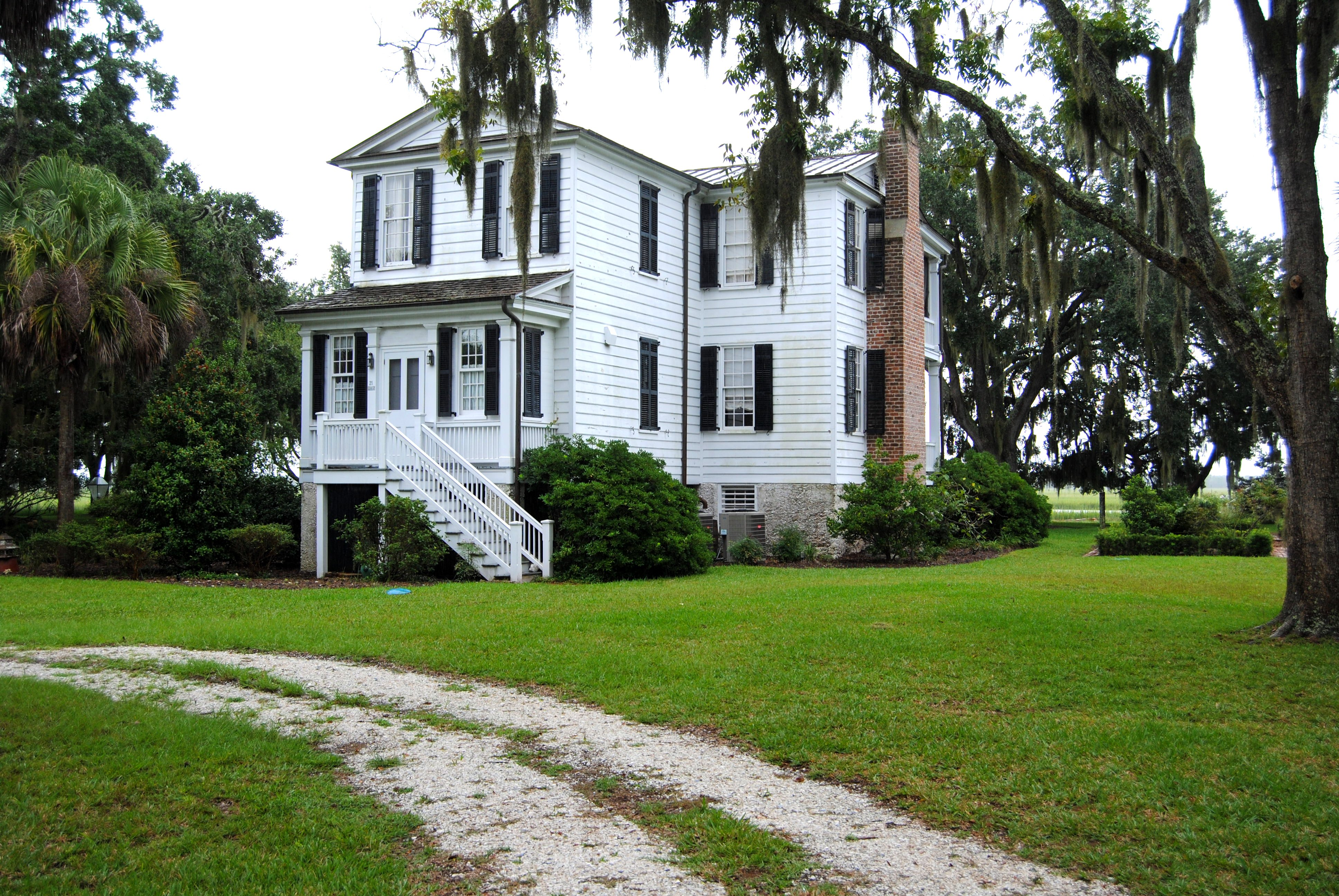

- Location within South Carolina Location within the United States
- Location: South of Frogmore on St. Helena's Island, near Frogmore, South Carolina
- Coordinates: 32°18′31″N 80°37′25″W
- Area: 14 acres (5.7 ha)
- Built: c. 1790-1800, 1862
- NRHP reference No.: 75001688
- Added to NRHP: September 18, 1975

Tombee Plantation is a historic plantation house located on Saint Helena Island near Frogmore, Beaufort County, South Carolina. It was built about 1790–1800, and is two-story, T-shaped frame dwelling. It is sheathed in clapboard and has a gable roof. It features a single-story front portico with four square columns and a two-story balustraded rear porch with six square columns on each floor. Along with Seaside Plantation, it is one of the few surviving antebellum plantation houses remaining on St. Helena Island. The Tombee Plantation property was divided into tracts during the days of the "Port Royal Experiment" in 1862. It remained in the hands of descendants of freed slaves until 1971.

It was listed in the National Register of Historic Places in 1975.
