= The Corner Packing Shed =

- U.S. National Register of Historic Places
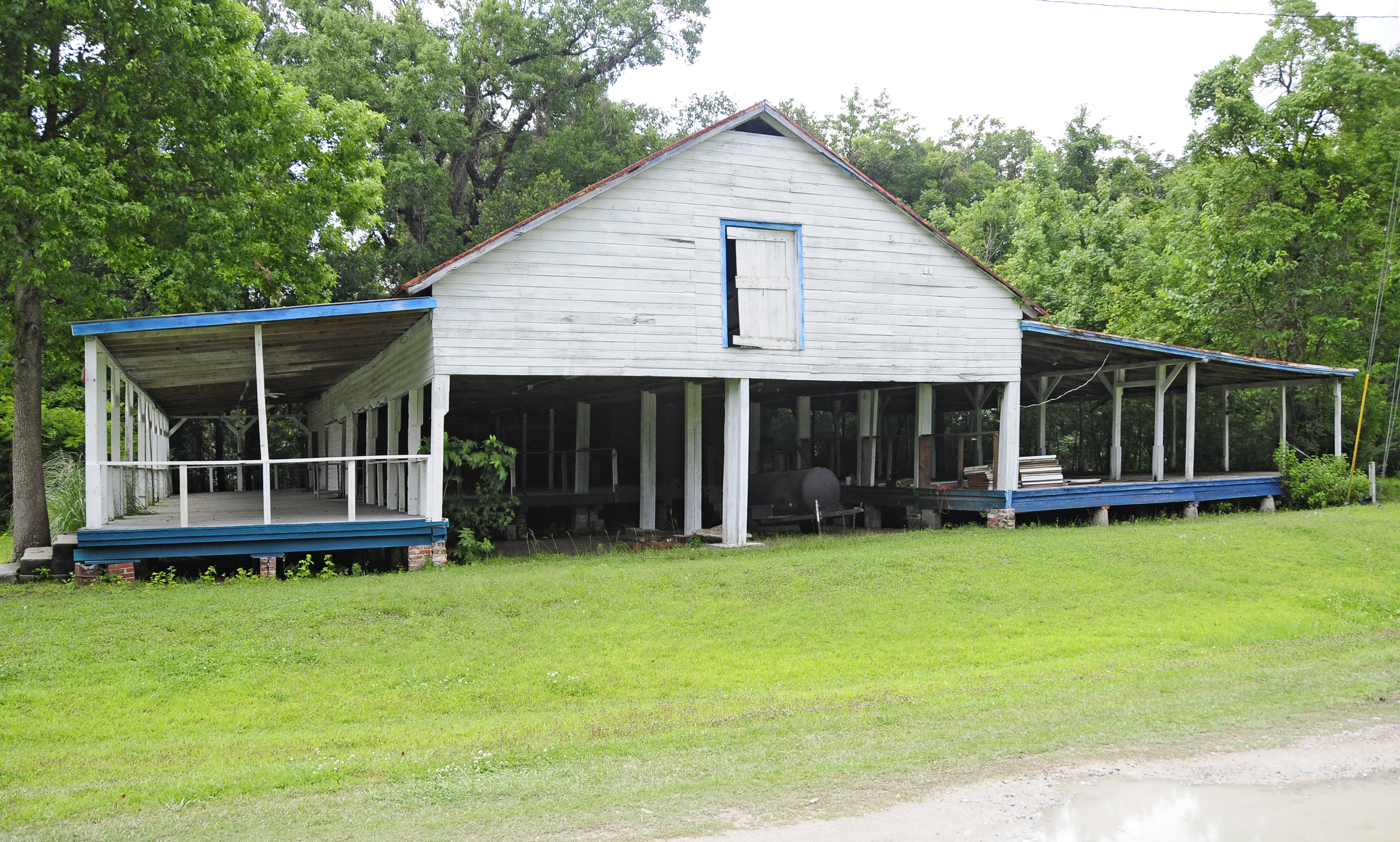

- Location within South Carolina Location within the United States
- Location: US Hwy. 21, W of jct. with Land's End Rd., Frogmore, South Carolina
- Coordinates: 32°23′51″N 80°34′34″W
- Area: less than one acre
- Built: 1930
- MPS: Historic Resources of St. Helena Island c. 1740-c. 1935 MPS
- NRHP reference No.: 88001733
- Added to NRHP: October 6, 1988

The Corner Packing Shed, in Frogmore, South Carolina, is a historic packing house on St. Helena Island that was built in 1930. It was listed on the National Register of Historic Places in 1988.
