= Frogmore, South Carolina =

Unincorporated community in South Carolina, US

Coordinates: 32°39′28″N 80°19′55″W

Frogmore is an unincorporated community on St. Helena Island in Beaufort County, South Carolina, United States, along U.S. Route 21.

Located halfway between Beaufort and Hunting Island State Park, the Frogmore area is primarily rural but is considered to be the commercial center of St. Helena Island. Frogmore is also the name of a plantation that has been listed on the National Register of Historic Places. The plantation is located off Seaside Road on Frogmore Manor Drive and is significant for its association with Laura Towne and Ellen Murray, the founders of Penn School.

Frogmore is renowned for being home to the Penn School Historic District, known as Penn Center, a National Historic Landmark. Dr. Martin Luther King Jr. studied and lectured at Penn Center during the formative years of his career as a civil rights leader. The museum at Penn Center is a noted cultural attraction and attracts tourists worldwide who are also interested in learning more about this region of the coastal Southeastern United States.

Frogmore Stew, a popular Lowcountry dish originated in the Frogmore community.

In addition to Frogmore Plantation and the Penn School Historic District, the Emanuel Alston House, Dr. York Bailey House, Coffin Point Plantation, Coffin Point Plantation Caretaker's House, The Corner Packing Shed, The Corner Store and Office, Eddings Point Community Praise House, Fort Fremont Battery, Fort Fremont Hospital, Edgar Fripp Mausoleum, St. Helena Island Parish Church, Isaac Fripp House Ruins, The Green, Mary Jenkins Community Praise House, Lands End Road Tabby Ruins, The Oaks, Orange Grove Plantation, Pine Island Plantation Complex, Riverside Plantation Tabby Ruins, St. Helena Parish Chapel of Ease Ruins, St. Helenaville Archaeological Site, Sams Plantation Complex Tabby Ruins, Robert Simmons House, and Tombee Plantation are listed on the National Register of Historic Places.
