= The Corner Store and Office =

- U.S. National Register of Historic Places
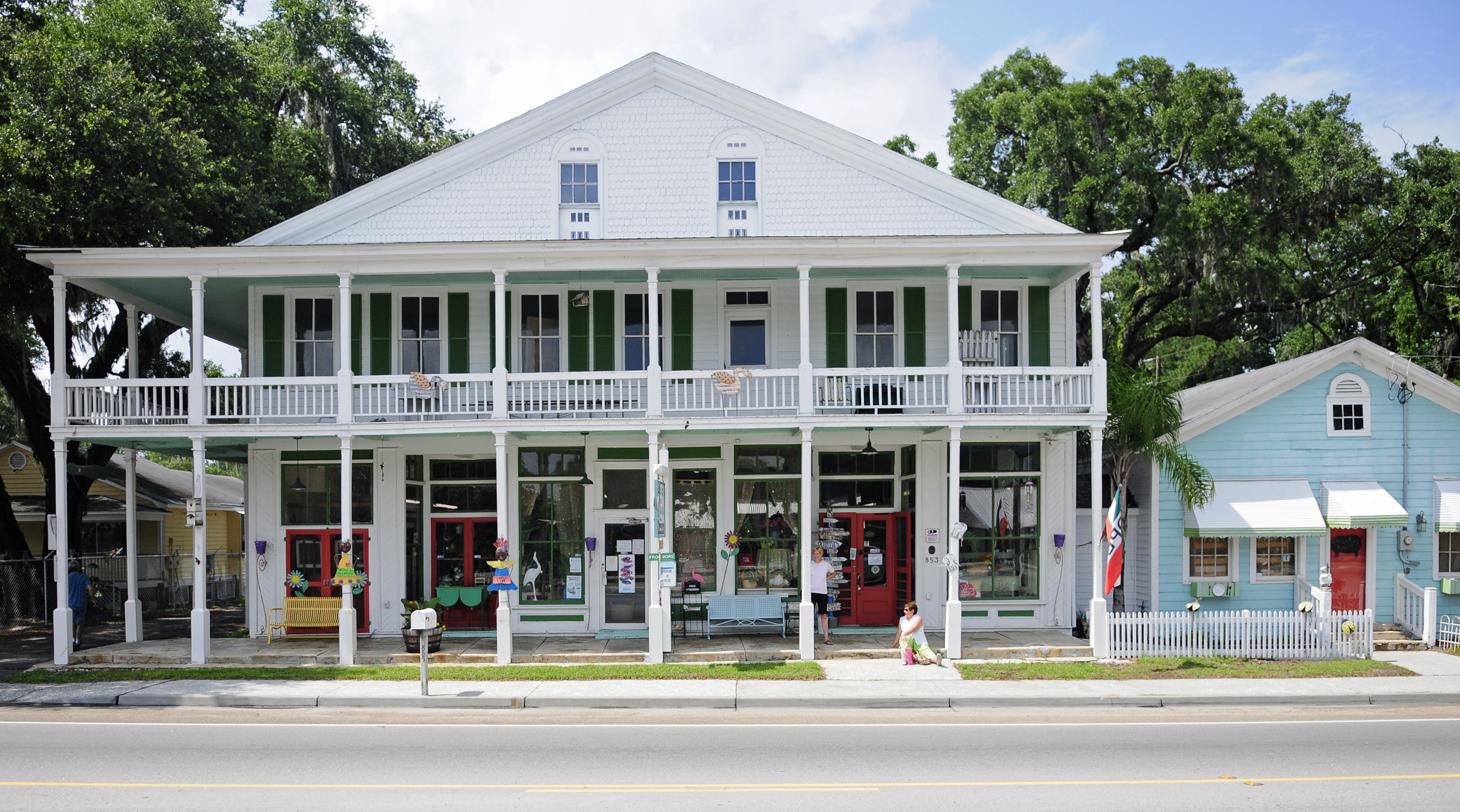
- The Corner Store and Office, June 2012

- Location within South Carolina Location within the United States
- Location: US Hwy. 21, W of jct. with Lands End Rd., Frogmore, South Carolina
- Coordinates: 32°23′48″N 80°34′43″W
- Area: less than one acre
- Built: 1905
- MPS: Historic Resources of St. Helena Island c. 1740-c. 1935 MPS
- NRHP reference No.: 88001737
- Added to NRHP: October 6, 1988

The Corner Store and Office, also known as the Frogmore Emporium, Macdonald, Wilkins, and Company Store and Mark D. Batchelder Office, is a historic general store, residence and, eventually, office building located on Saint Helena Island near Frogmore, Beaufort County, South Carolina. Primarily built as a house, it was built about 1877, and is a two-story, wood-frame building with a gable roof. It features a two-story wraparound porch. The adjacent one-story house was built about 1905. The store sold provisions to the islanders, most of whom were African American, and became one of the major centers of commercial and social activity on St. Helena. The home and businesses in the building were owned by Cameron Thomas and his relatives for most of the 20th century. The family lived in the back and upstairs portion of the house, while the front included a general store and liquor store, with the small house added on used as a residence for relatives. The store also had the only gas pump on the island for many years.

It was listed in the National Register of Historic Places in 1988.
