= The Oaks (Frogmore, South Carolina) =

Historic house in South Carolina, United States

- U.S. National Register of Historic Places
- Location within South Carolina Location within the United States
- Location: On an unpaved road, 0.3 miles west of Secondary Road 165, near Frogmore, South Carolina
- Coordinates: 32°23′21″N 80°37′12″W
- Area: 2.4 acres (0.97 ha)
- Built: c. 1855
- Architectural style: I-House
- MPS: Historic Resources of St. Helena Island c. 1740-c. 1935 MPS
- NRHP reference No.: 88001773
- Added to NRHP: October 6, 1988

The Oaks, also known as the Cooler House, is a historic plantation house located on Saint Helena Island near Frogmore, Beaufort County, South Carolina. It was built about 1855, and is a two-story, vernacular frame I-House. Edward L. Pierce chose The Oaks as his headquarters during the military occupation of St. Helena during the American Civil War. The Oaks was the center for military and agricultural activities on the island. On June 18, 1862, Ellen Murray, who had ten days earlier arrived from Pennsylvania, opened the Penn School for Freedmen in a back room of the house. The house also served as a hotel for military personnel from Port Royal, superintendents, and teachers.

It was listed in the National Register of Historic Places in 1988.
