= Robert Simmons House =

Historic house in South Carolina, United States

- U.S. National Register of Historic Places
- Location within South Carolina Location within the United States
- Location: On an unpaved road, 0.5 miles south of U.S. Route 21, near Frogmore, South Carolina
- Coordinates: 32°23′29″N 80°36′15″W
- Area: 3.2 acres (1.3 ha)
- Built: 1910
- Architectural style: Double-pen house
- MPS: Historic Resources of St. Helena Island c. 1740-c. 1935 MPS
- NRHP reference No.: 88001779
- Added to NRHP: October 6, 1988

Robert Simmons House, also known as the Willie Simmons House, is a historic home located on Saint Helena Island near Frogmore, Beaufort County, South Carolina. The original section was built about 1910 by farmer Robert Simmons, and subsequently expanded. It is a double pen house type on metal piers, with a full-width shed roof porch supported by wood posts. It is a rare example of a vernacular architectural form once common to St. Helena Island.

It was listed in the National Register of Historic Places in 1988.
