= Edgar Fripp Mausoleum, St. Helena Island Parish Church =

Mausoleum in Frogmore, South Carolina, US

- Fripp, Edgar, Mausoleum, St. Helena Island Parish Church
- U.S. National Register of Historic Places
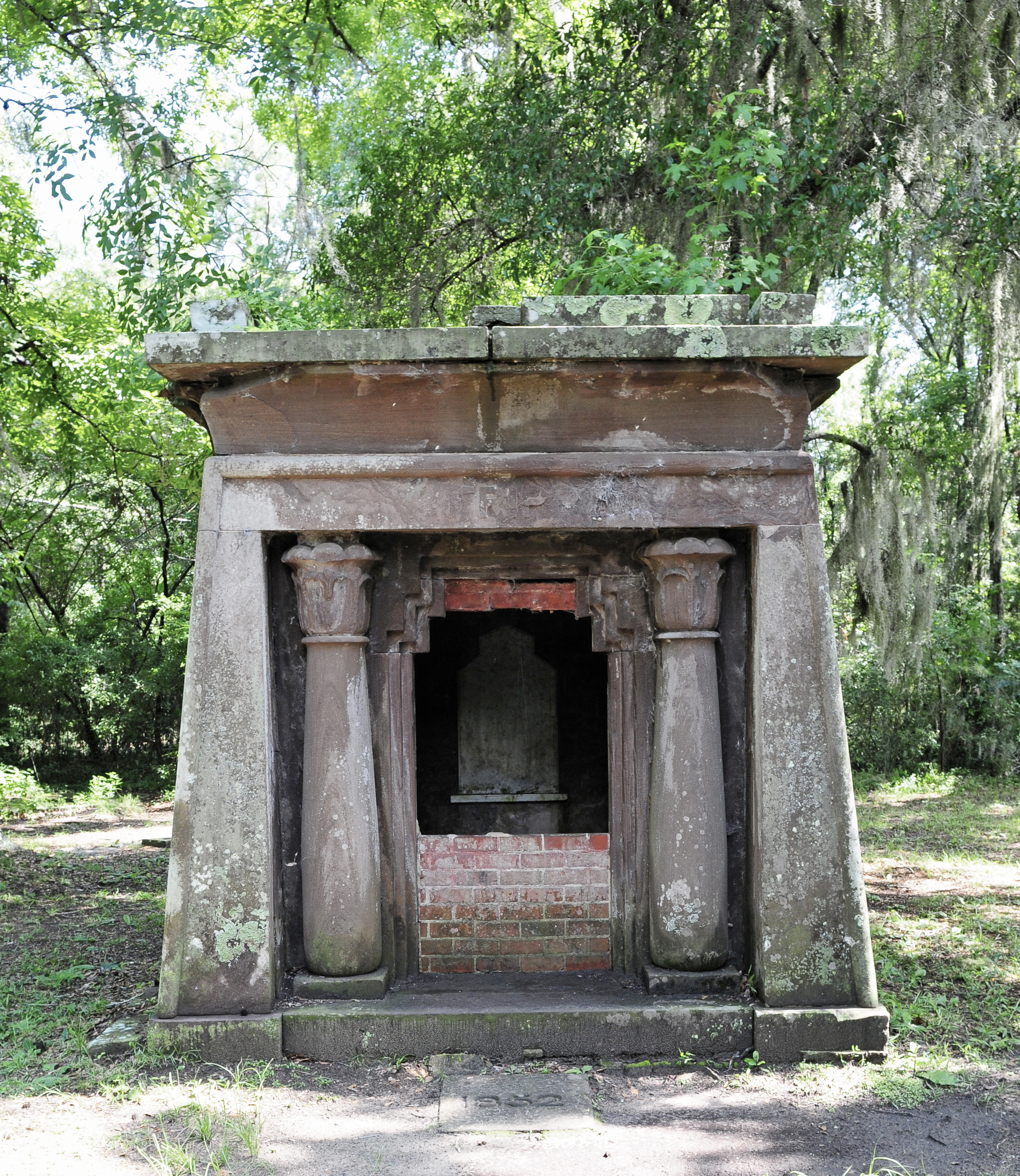

- Location within South Carolina Location within the United States Location within the United States
- Nearest city: Frogmore, South Carolina
- Coordinates: 32°22′30″N 80°34′34″W
- Area: less than one acre
- Built: 1852
- Architect: White, William T.
- Architectural style: Exotic Revival, Egyptian Revival
- MPS: Historic Resources of St. Helena Island c. 1740–c. 1935 MPS
- NRHP reference No.: 88001743
- Added to NRHP: October 06, 1988

Edgar Fripp Mausoleum, St. Helena Island Parish Church is a historic mausoleum in Frogmore, South Carolina, United States.

The Egyptian Revival mausoleum was built in 1852 and added to the National Register of Historic Places in 1988.
