= Emanuel Alston House =

Historic house in South Carolina, United States

- U.S. National Register of Historic Places
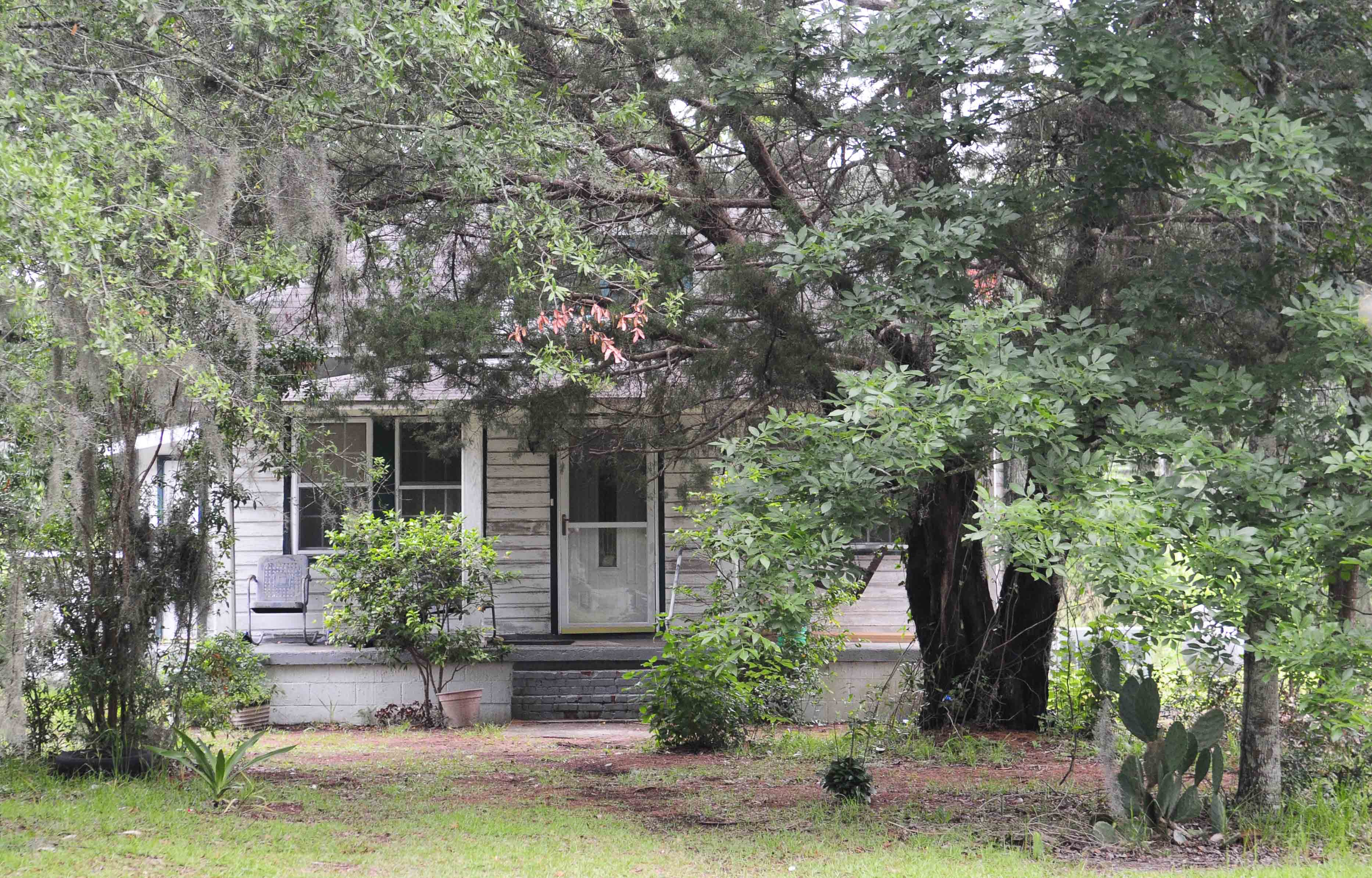
- Emanuel Alston House, June 2012

- Location within South Carolina Location within the United States
- Location: Secondary Road 161, 0.25 miles north of its junction with U.S. Route 21, near Frogmore, South Carolina
- Coordinates: 32°24′11″N 80°33′32″W
- Area: 7.5 acres (3.0 ha)
- Built: c. 1915
- Architectural style: One-story hipped roof house
- MPS: Historic Resources of St. Helena Island c. 1740-c. 1935 MPS
- NRHP reference No.: 88001723
- Added to NRHP: October 6, 1988

Emanuel Alston House is a historic home located on Saint Helena Island near Frogmore, Beaufort County, South Carolina. It was built about 1915, and is a rectangular one-story, vernacular frame dwelling on a brick foundation, with a metal hipped roof. The front façade features a full-width porch, with a low hipped roof. A shed or hipped roof dormer located on the front roof slope provides light and ventilation to the attic space.

It was listed in the National Register of Historic Places in 1988.
