= Coffin Point Plantation =

Historic house in South Carolina, United States

- U.S. National Register of Historic Places
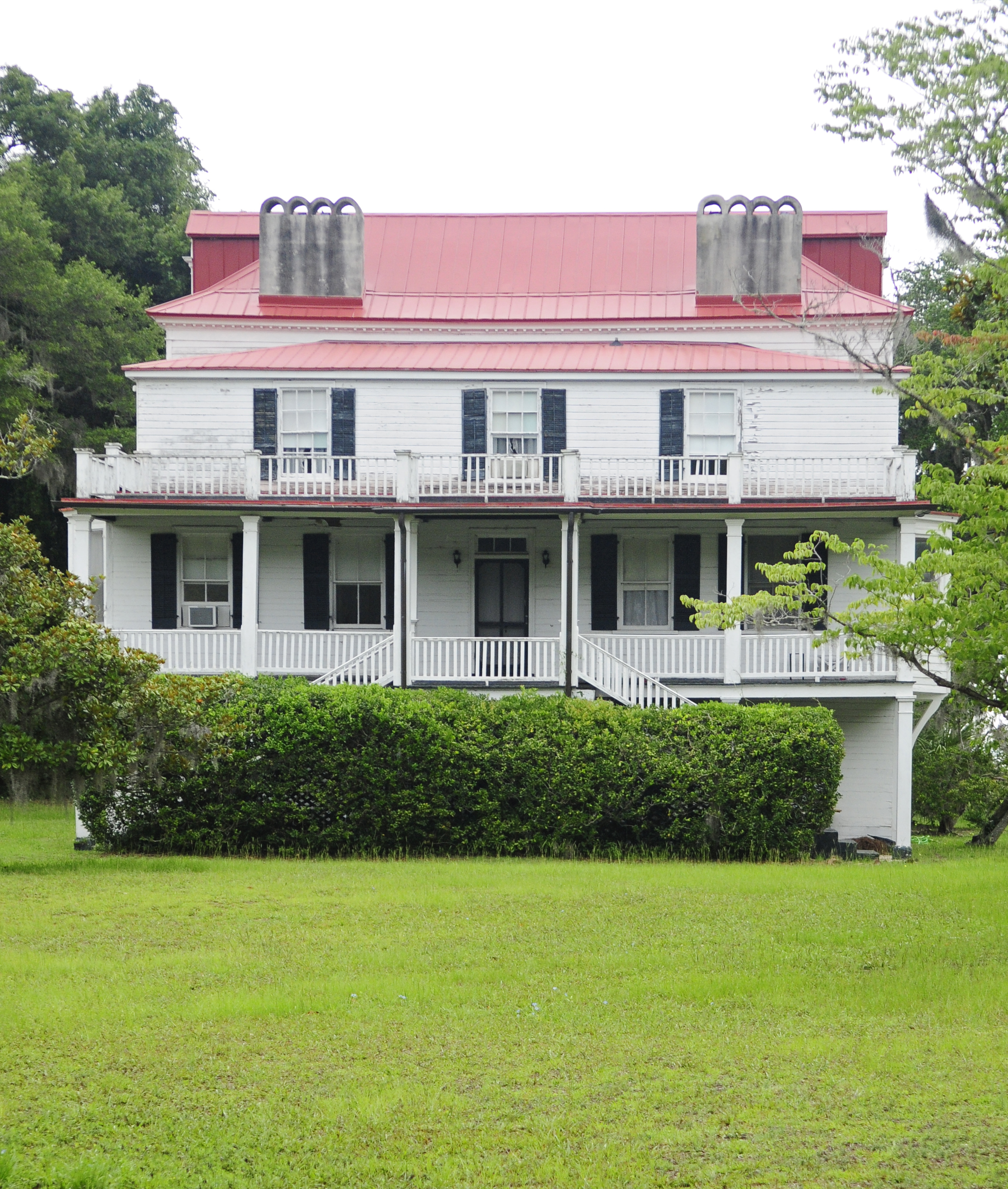

- Location within South Carolina Location within the United States
- Nearest city: Frogmore, South Carolina
- Coordinates: 32°25′58″N 80°28′32″W
- Area: 22 acres (8.9 ha)
- Built: 1801
- Architectural style: Federal
- NRHP reference No.: 75001687
- Added to NRHP: August 28, 1975

Coffin Point Plantation, is a historic plantation house located in the Frogmore area of Beaufort County, South Carolina, USA. A Sea Island plantation.

Ebenezer Coffin, born in Boston in 1763, received 1120 acres and 63 chattel slaves from his father-in-law and had the house built on the property.

It is estimated that the home was built around 1801, and like many early 19th century homes in the area, features a tabby foundation. One of the home's more striking features is the one-half mile avenue of oaks that leads to the home.

In 1862, during the Civil War, 260 people were recorded as being enslaved on the plantation.

James Donald Cameron, a Republican U.S. Senator from Pennsylvania and former Secretary of War bought the plantation house in the early 1890s. Henry Adams described his visits to the Camerons at the plantation in his book The Education of Henry Adams.

The plantation was placed in the National Historic Register on August 28, 1975.
