= Sams Plantation Complex Tabby Ruins =

Archaeological site in South Carolina, United States

- U.S. National Register of Historic Places
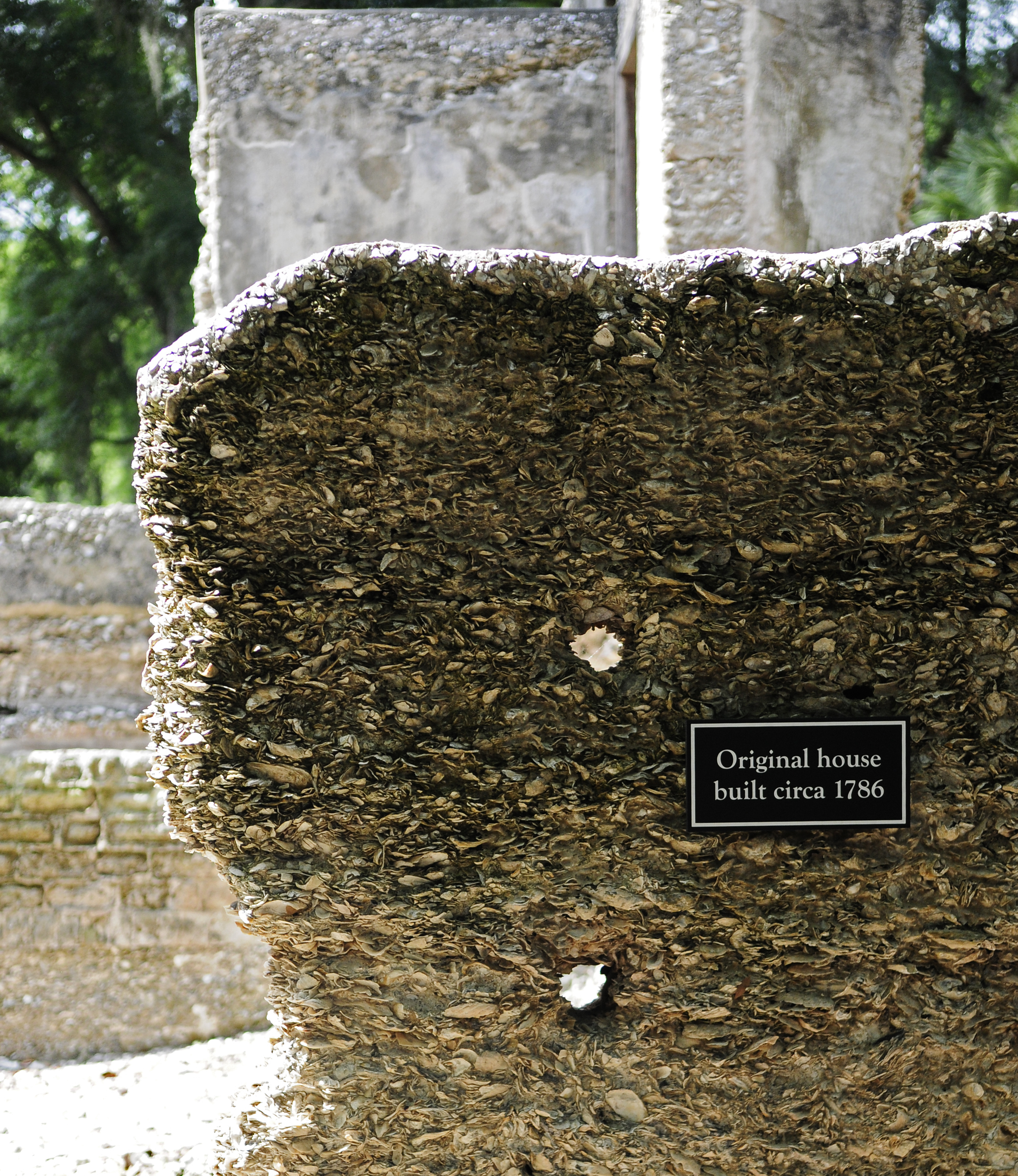
- Sams Plantation Complex Tabby Ruins, June 2012

- Location within South Carolina Location within the United States
- Location: Southern end of Dataw (Datha) Island near the intersection of Dataw Dr. and Dataw Club Rd., at Mink's Point near Jenkins Creek, near Frogmore, South Carolina
- Coordinates: 32°25′51″N 80°35′40″W
- Area: 10 acres (4.0 ha)
- Built: c. 1783
- MPS: Historic Resources of St. Helena Island c. 1740-c. 1935 MPS
- NRHP reference No.: 88001820
- Added to NRHP: March 4, 2011

Sams Plantation Complex Tabby Ruins is a historic plantation complex and archaeological site located at Frogmore, Beaufort County, South Carolina. The site, possibly built upon and occupied well before 1783. It includes the ruins and/or archaeological remains of at least 12 tabby structures. They include the main plantation house, a rectangular enclosure consisting of tabby walls, a large tabby kitchen, and five tabby slave quarters. Also on the property were a variety of tabby dependencies including a barn/stable, a smokehouse or blade house, a well/dairy house, and a well. The property also includes the Sams family cemetery and Episcopal chapel enclosed by high tabby walls. Other structures include possibly an overseer's house, a granary/mill, and a tabby cotton house. During and subsequent to the American Civil War, the Sams Tabby Complex was occupied by freedmen. Following the Civil War, the plantation house was destroyed by hurricanes.

It was listed in the National Register of Historic Places in 2011.
