= Fort Fremont =

- Fort Fremont Battery
- U.S. National Register of Historic Places
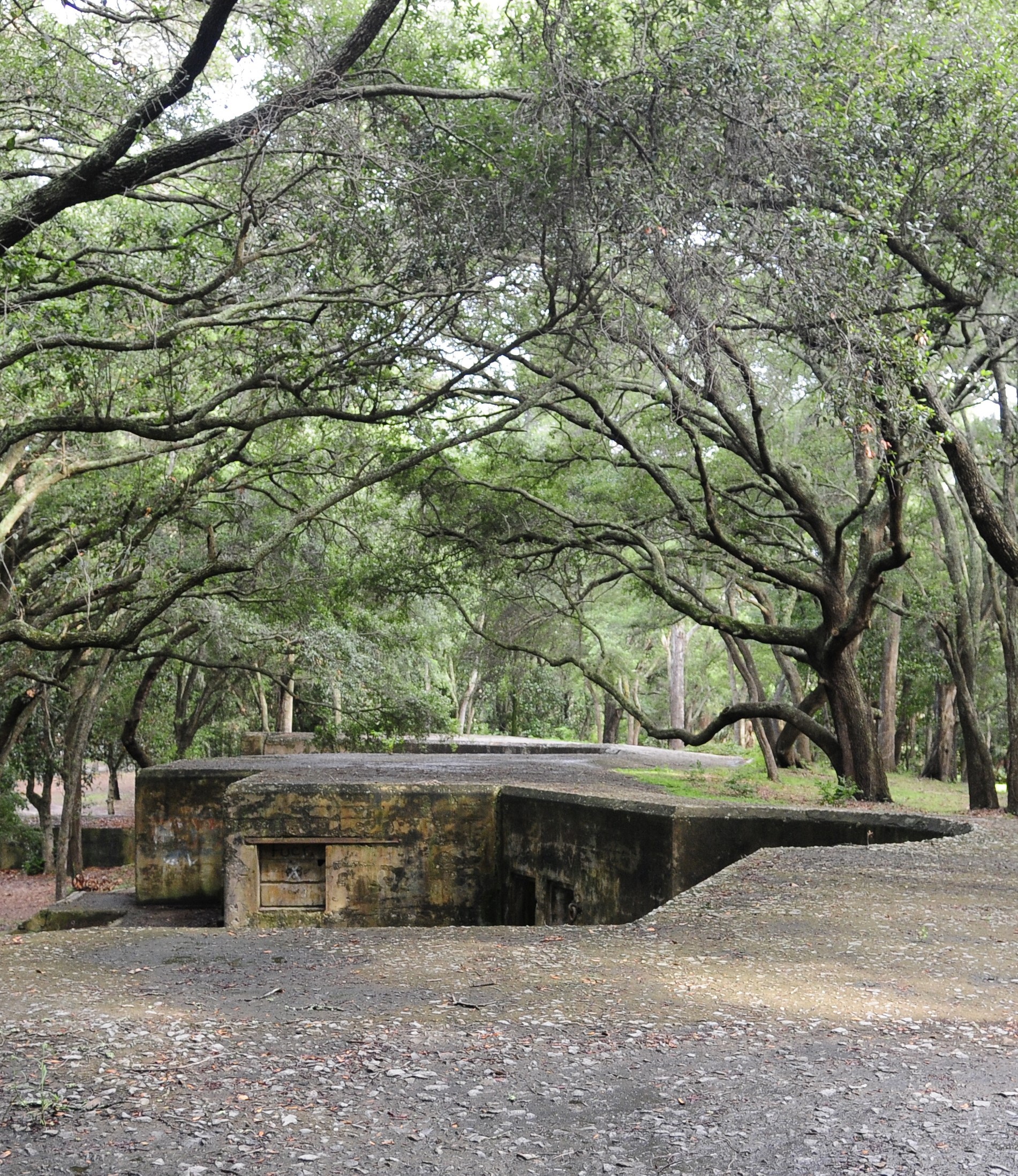

- Location within South Carolina Location within the United States
- Nearest city: Frogmore, South Carolina
- Coordinates: 32°18′20″N 80°38′36″W
- Area: 2.8 acres (1.1 ha)
- Built: 1899
- Built by: US Army Corps of Engineers
- Architectural style: Coastal Fortification
- MPS: Historic Resources of St. Helena Island c. 1740-c. 1935 MPS
- NRHP reference No.: 88001821 (original); 100006498 (increase)

Significant dates
- Added to NRHP: May 5, 2010
- Boundary increase: May 6, 2021

Fort Fremont (sometimes misspelled 'Freemont') was a military installation on Saint Helena Island, Beaufort County, South Carolina. The fort and battery is historically significant as an example of late nineteenth and early twentieth century military architecture and as one of two surviving coastal fortifications in the United States intact from the Spanish–American War era.

== Construction ==
The construction of additional coastal batteries was authorized by Congress under the $50 million Harbor Fortification Defense Act of 1898 due to the Spanish–American War. Fort Fremont was built by the Corps of Engineers on condemned private property, with construction starting in 1899. The Corps of Engineers hired labor from the Beaufort area to build the military complex.

== Details ==
The fort was named after John C. Fremont, the first presidential candidate of the Republican Party in 1856. Later, Fremont was a Civil War general.

The complex at Fort Fremont consisted of almost 170 acres (69 ha) of land with numerous outbuildings, including an Administration building, guard house, barracks, hospital, stable, mess hall, bakery, commissary, post exchange, lavatory, and water tower. The garrison's single artillery company operated three 10-inch disappearing guns and two 4.7-inch rapid fire guns. Much of the bastions and the concrete emplacements for the guns remain today.

In 1900, Fort Fremont was turned over to the Coastal Artillery.

== Deactivation ==
As early as 1906 the War Department gave serious consideration to the closing of Fort Fremont, due to budgetary constraints.

Regarding reports that Fort Fremont would be sold or abandoned, the April 16, 1912 issue of the Beaufort Gazette quoted the Assistant Secretary of War: "... I have the honor to inform you that no such action is contemplated at present." A small detachment of soldiers had been serving as caretakers at the fort after troops stationed there had been reassigned to Galveston the previous year.

A December 7, 1921 Charleston News and Courier article reported that the U.S. Treasury Department requested Fort Fremont from the U.S. War Department for use as a quarantine station. The property had by then been placed on the Secretary of War's list of properties no longer needed for military purposes and available for sale. Fort Fremont was subsequently deactivated as a military installation in 1921.

The fort was decommissioned and sold at public auction by the War Department in 1930. The Fort Fremont Battery was listed in the National Register of Historic Places (NRHP) on May 5, 2010. Today the fort is a Historical Preserve. Only the 10 inch battery, the rapid-fire battery, and the brick hospital built in 1906 survive. All the other structures were made of wood and were demolished at various points before 1989, when documentation was submitted to the NRHP. The documentation states that "Fort Fremont is one of only two extant Spanish–American War fortifications which retain their character from that period."

== Gallery ==
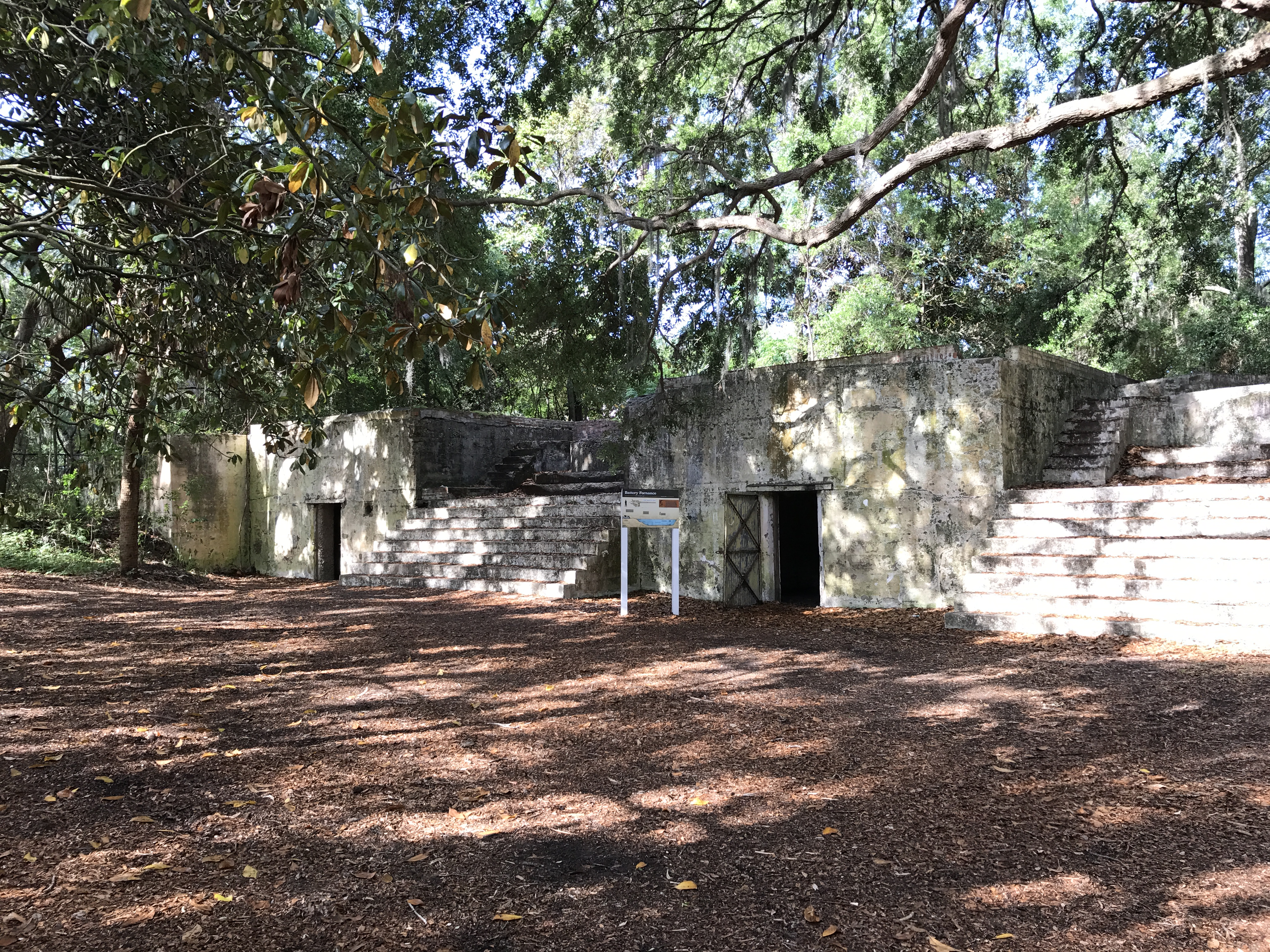
Rear view of Fort Fremont

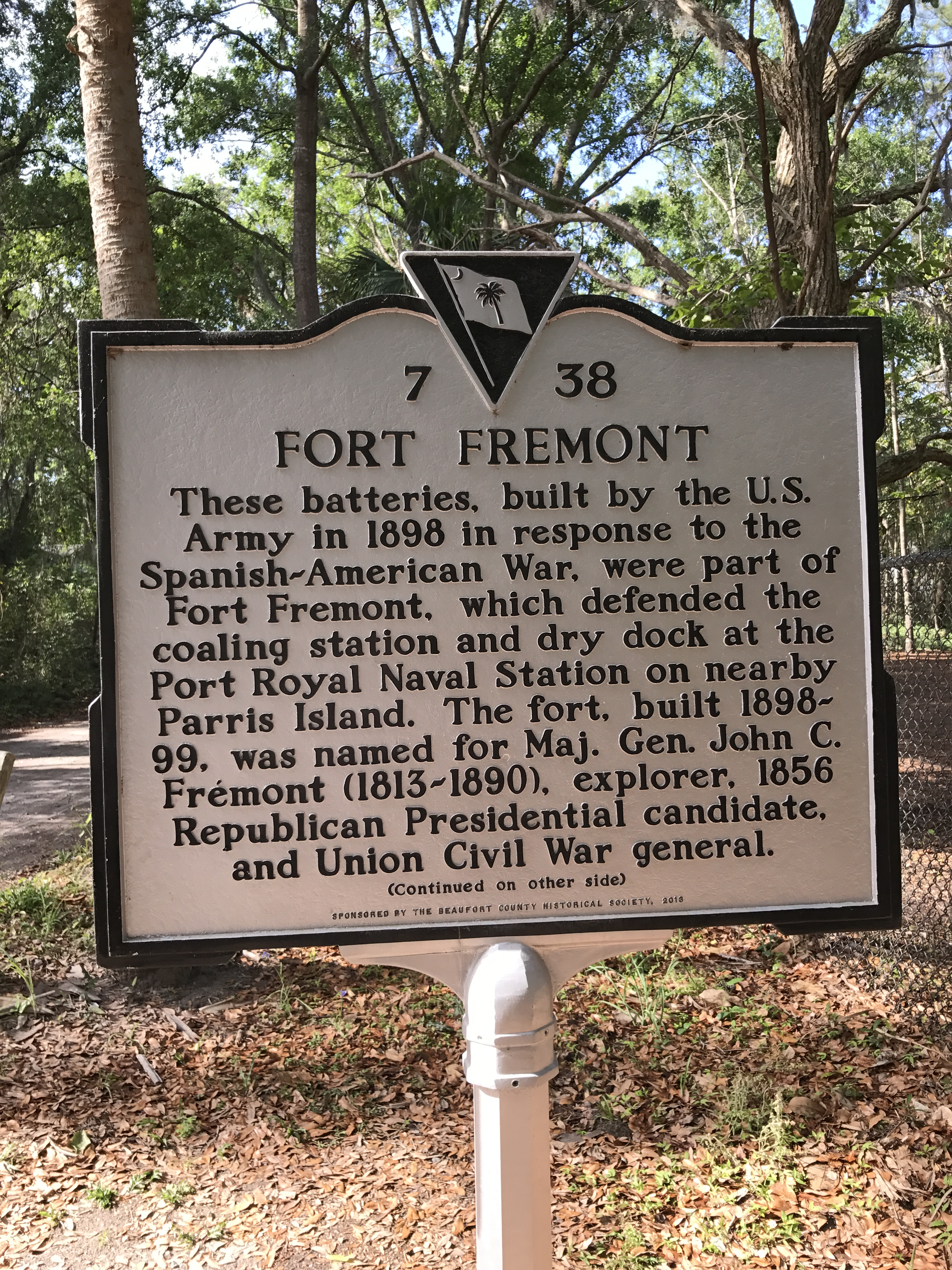
Front face of historical plaque

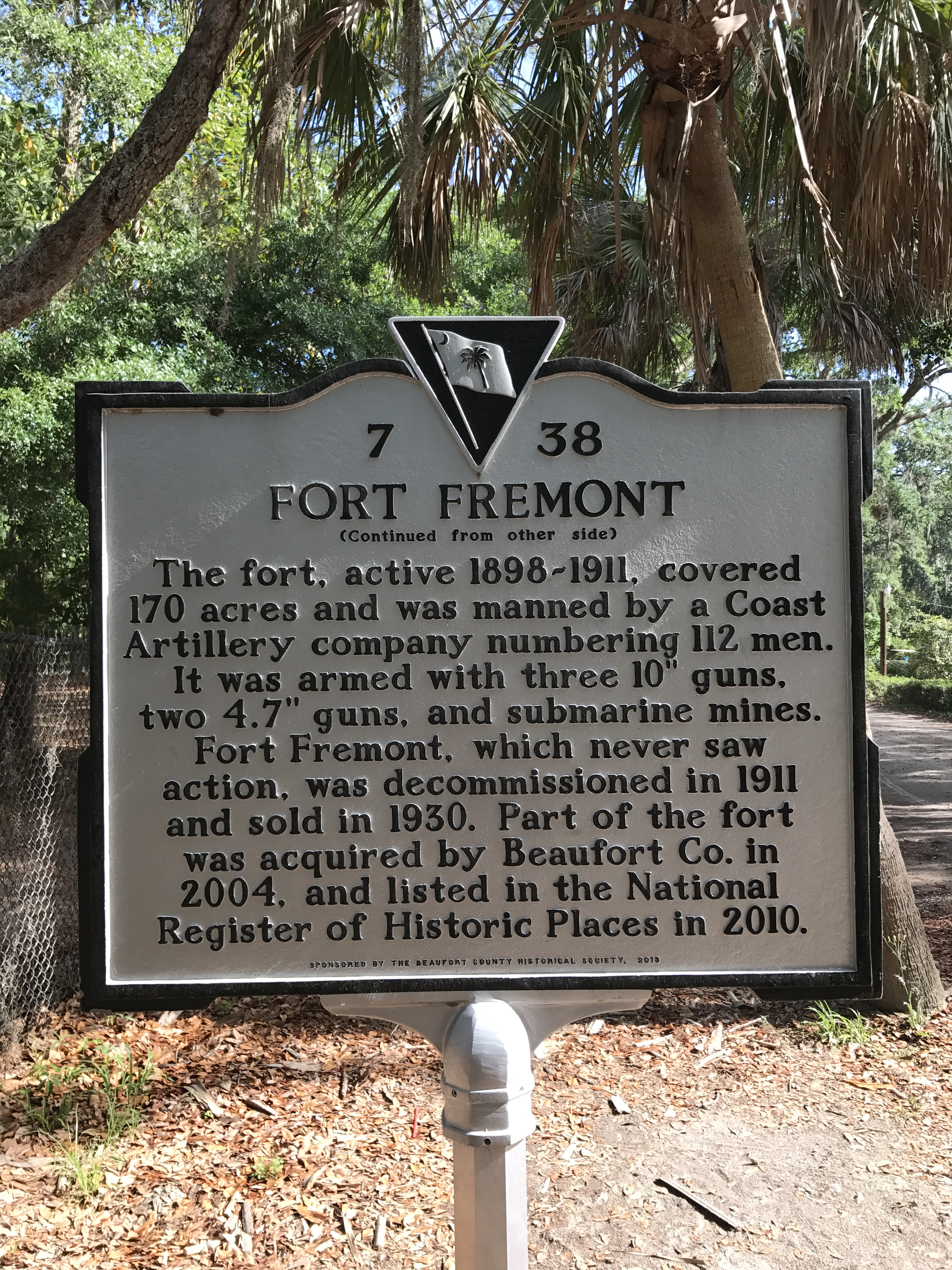
Rear face of historical plaque
