= Tabby concrete =

Type of concrete using lime from burnt shell

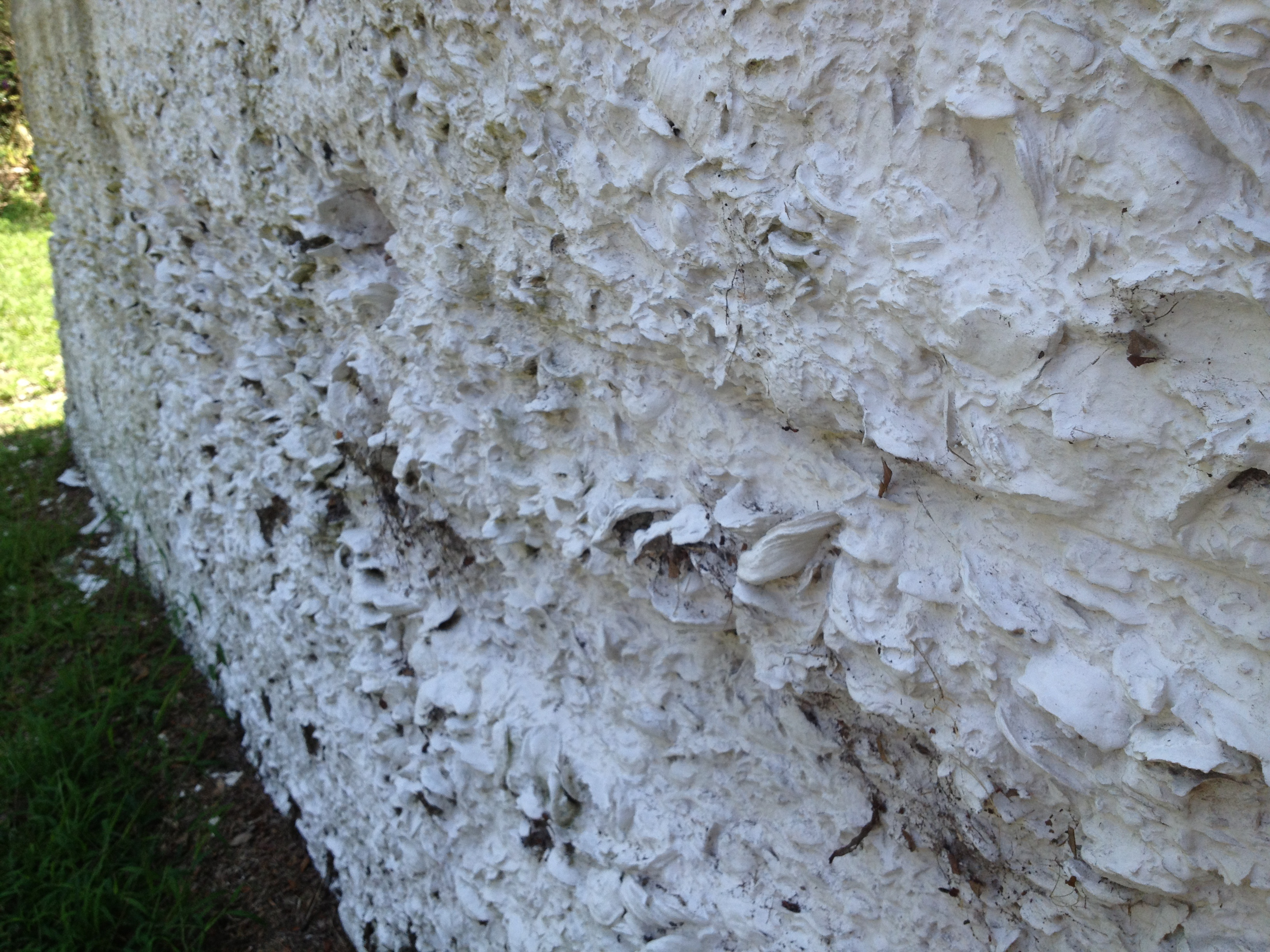
Original tabby concrete walls of slave housing at Kingsley Plantation, early nineteenth century

Tabby is a type of concrete made by burning oyster shells to create lime, then mixing it with water, sand, ash and broken oyster shells. Tabby was used by early Spanish settlers in present-day Florida, then by British colonists primarily in coastal South Carolina and Georgia. It is a man-made analogue of coquina, a naturally occurring sedimentary rock derived from shells and also used for building.

Revivals in the use of tabby spread northward and continued into the early 19th century. Tabby was normally protected with a coating of plaster or stucco.

== Origin ==
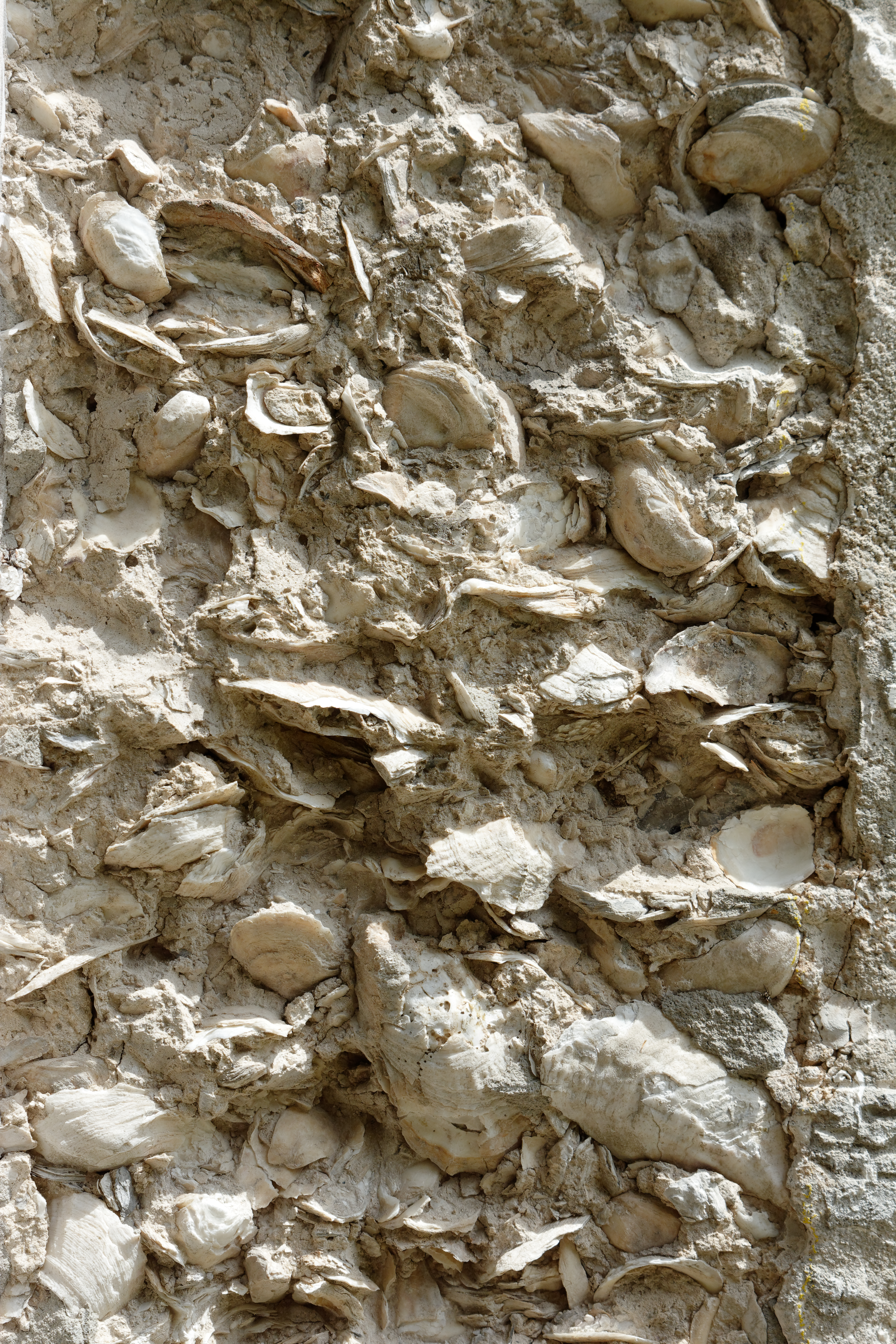
Tabby at the Hamilton Plantation slave houses, St. Simons, Georgia

There is evidence that North African Moors brought a predecessor form of tabby to Spain when they invaded the Iberian Peninsula, but there is also evidence that the Iberian use is earlier and that it spread from there south to Morocco. A form of tabby is used in Morocco today and some tabby structures survive in Spain, though in both instances the aggregate is granite, not oyster shells.

It is likely that 16th-century Spanish explorers first brought tabby (which appears as tabee, tapis, tappy and tapia in early documents) to the coast of Florida in the 16th century. Tapia is Spanish for 'mud wall' and Arabic tabbi means 'a mixture of mortar and lime' or African tabi. In fact, the mortar used to chink the earliest cabins in this area was a mixture of mud and Spanish moss.

The oldest known example of tabby concrete in North America is the Spanish Fort San Antón de Carlos located on Mound Key in Florida. Some researchers believe that English colonists developed their own process independently of the Spanish.

James Oglethorpe is credited with introducing "Oglethorpe tabby" into Georgia after seeing Spanish forts in Florida and encouraging its use, using it for his house near Fort Frederica. Later Thomas Spalding, who had grown up in Oglethorpe's house, led a tabby revival in the second quarter of the 19th century sometimes referred to as "Spalding tabby". Another revival occurred with the development of Jekyll Island in the 1880s.

== Regions of use ==
Limestone to make building lime was not locally available to early settlers, so lime was imported or made from oyster shells. Shell middens along the coast were a supply of shells to make tabby, which diffused from two primary centers or hearths: one at St. Augustine, Florida, and the other at Beaufort, South Carolina.

The British tradition began later (some time close to, but earlier than, 1700, upon introduction of the techniques from Spanish Florida) than the Spanish (1580), and spread far more widely as a building material, reaching at least as far north as Staten Island, New York, where it can be found in the still-standing Abraham Manee House, erected circa 1670. Beaufort, South Carolina, was both the primary center for British tabby and the location of the earliest British tabby in the southeastern US. It was here that the British tradition first developed, and from this hearth tabby eventually spread throughout the sea island district.

Herbert Eugene Bolton, John Tate Lanning, and other historians believed, from the mid-19th century into the middle of the 20th century, that tabby ruins in coastal Georgia and northeastern Florida were the remains of Spanish missions, even though local residents had earlier identified the ruins as those of late-18th century plantation buildings. The fact that the ruins were of structures built after the establishment of the Georgia Colony by Great Britain was not fully accepted by historians until late in the 20th century. With the exception of St. Augustine and, possibly, a few other important places, Spanish mission buildings were built with wooden posts supporting the roof and walls of palmetto thatch, wattle and daub or planks, or left open.

The LaPointe Krebs House, also known as the Old Spanish Fort (Pascagoula, Mississippi) is an extant tabby structure on the U.S. Gulf of Mexico. The house was constructed in 1757 in Louisiane, during the French Colonial period.

Tabby was used in the West Indies, including the islands of Antigua and Barbados.

== Process ==
The labor-intensive process depended on slave labor to crush and burn the oyster shells into quicklime. The quicklime was then slaked (hydrated) and combined with more shells, sand, and water. It was poured or tamped into wood forms called cradles, built up in layers in a similar manner to rammed earth. Tabby was used in place of bricks, which could not be made locally because of the absence of local clay.

Tabby was used like concrete for floors, foundations, columns, roofs. Besides replacing bricks, it was also used as "oyster shell mortar" or "burnt shell mortar".

== Significant examples ==
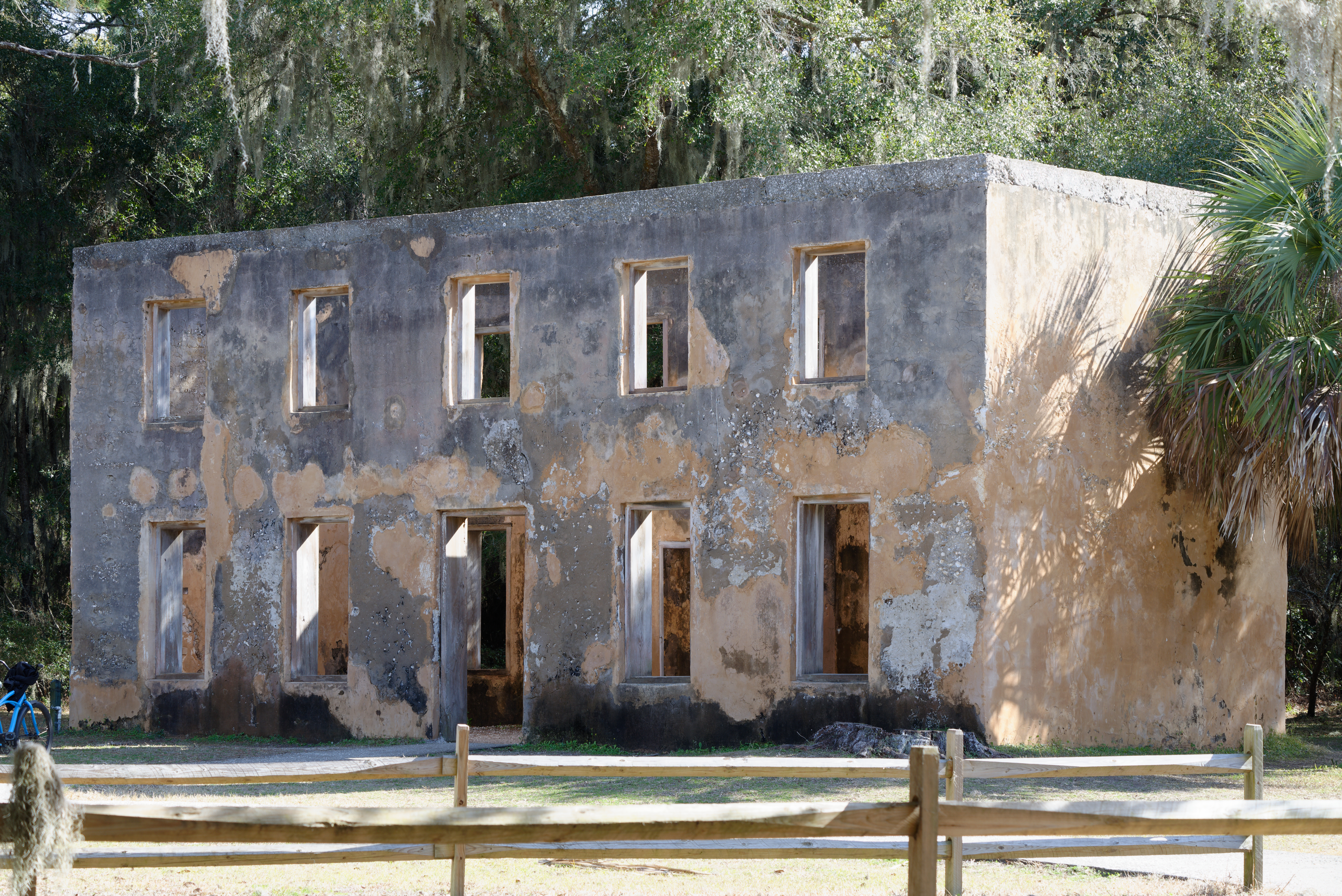
Horton House, built in 1743

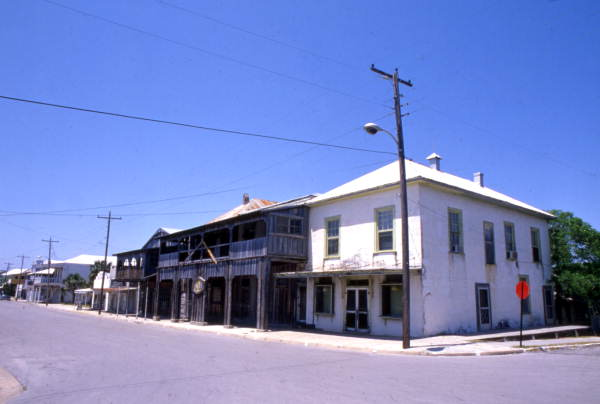
Historic Bodiford Drug Store, Cedar Key, Florida

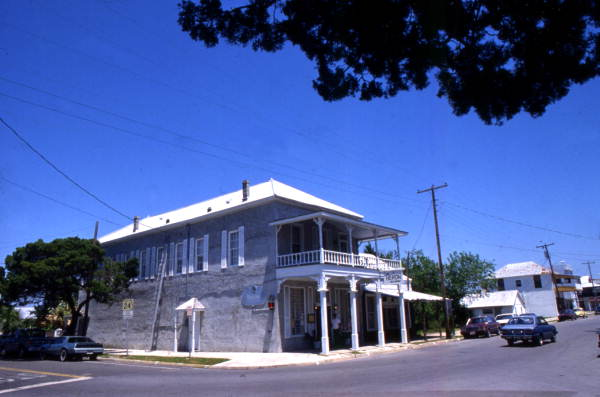
Heron Restaurant, Hale Building, Cedar Key, Florida, incorporates an older tabby structure.

- St. Simons Island Light, Georgia (foundation only)
- Wormsloe Plantation house ruins, Isle of Hope, Georgia
- McIntosh Sugarmill, Camden County, Georgia. Link to historical marker on McIntosh sugar works
- Horton House, Jekyll Island, Georgia. There is a historical marker.
- Slave quarters at Kingsley Plantation, Fort George Island, near Jacksonville, Florida
- Bodiford Drug Store, Cedar Key, Florida
- Heron Restaurant, Cedar Key, Florida
- Island Hotel, Cedar Key, Florida
- Isaac Fripp House Ruins, Saint Helena Island near Frogmore, South Carolina
- Along Florida's west coast, Gamble Plantation Mansion, Ellenton
- George Adderley House in Marathon, Florida
- Colonial Dorchester State Historic Site near Charleston, South Carolina
- Tabby Manse (Thomas Fuller House), Beaufort, South Carolina
- The LaPointe Krebs House, also known as the Old Spanish Fort (Pascagoula, Mississippi)

== See also ==
- Bahareque
