= List of lighthouses in South Carolina =

This is a list of lighthouses in South Carolina.

Name	Image	Location	Coordinates	Year first lit	Automated	Year deactivated	Current Lens	Focal Height
Bloody Point Range Front Light	N/A	Daufuskie Island	N/A	1883	Never	1922 (Preserved)	None	Unknown
Bloody Point Range Rear Light	N/A	Daufuskie Island	N/A	1883 (First); 1899 (Last)	Never	1922 (Removed)	None	81 ft (25 m) (Original rear range)
Bulls Bay Light	N/A	Charleston County	N/A	1852 (First); 1900 (Last)	Never	1913 (Destroyed)	None	44 ft (13 m) (First lighthouse)
Cape Romain Light (Old)		Cape Romain	33°01′06.6″N 79°22′26.6″W	1827	Never	1858	None	88 ft (27 m)
Cape Romain Light (New)		Cape Romain	33°01′08″N 79°22′25″W	1858	1937	1947	None	161 ft (49 m)
Castle Pinckney Light		Charleston County	32°46′25.1″N 79°54′39.6″W	1855 (First); 1890 (Last)	Never	1917 (Destroyed by 1938)	None	50 ft (15 m)
Charleston Light		Sullivan's Island	32°45′28.5″N 79°50′35.7″W	1962	1975	Active	DCB-24	163 ft (50 m)
Combahee Bank Light	N/A	Saint Helena Sound	32°28′N 80°26′W	1868	Never	1876 (Removed in 1925)	None	Unknown
Fort Ripley Shoal Light		Charleston	32.766°N 79.902°W (Estimated)	1878	Never	1932 (Dismantled)	None	Unknown
Fort Sumter Range Front Light		Charleston	32°45′8″N 79°52′29″W	1855 (First); 1893 (Last)	Never	1950s	None	Unknown
Fort Sumter Range Rear Light		Charleston	32°45′8″N 79°52′29″W	1855 (First); 1893 (Last)	Never	1915	None	140 ft (43 m)
Georgetown Light		Winyah Bay	33°13′21.47″N 79°11′6.18″W	1801 (First); 1867 (Current)	1986	Active	VRB-25	85 ft (26 m)
Governor's Light^{A}	N/A	Little River	N/A	1985 (Private)	Always	Active	Unknown	60 ft (18 m)
Haig Point Front Range Light		Daufuskie Island	N/A	1873	Never	Disputed^{B} (Removed)	None	17 ft (5.2 m)
Haig Point Rear Range Light		Daufuskie Island	N/A	1873	1987 (Relit)	Active (Inactive: ????-1987^{B})	Acrylic	70 ft (21 m)
Harbour Town Light		Hilton Head Island	32°08′19″N 80°48′46″W	1970	Always	Active	Unknown	90 ft (27 m)
Hilton Head Range Front Light	N/A	Hilton Head Island	N/A	1881	Never	1932 (Destroyed)	None	35 ft (11 m)
Hilton Head Range Rear Light		Hilton Head Island	32°9′51″N 80°44′24″W	1880	Never	1932	None	92 ft (28 m)
Hunting Island Light		Beaufort (Hunting Island State Park)	32°22′32″N 80°26′15″W	1859 (First); 1875 (Current)	1995 (Relit)	Active (Inactive: 1933-1995	Unknown	132 ft (40 m)
Morris Island Range Front Light^{C}	N/A	Morris Island	N/A	1871	Never	Unknown^{D} (Removed)	None	Unknown
Morris Island Range Rear Light^{C}	N/A	Morris Island	N/A	1871	Never	Unknown^{D} (Removed)	None	Unknown
Morris Island Light		Morris Island	32°41′43″N 79°53′1″W	1767 (First); 1876 (Current)	1938	1962	None	Unknown
Parris Island Range Front Light	N/A	Parris Island	N/A	1881	Never	1923	None	Unknown
Parris Island Range Rear Light	N/A	Parris Island	32°18′46″N 80°40′39″W	1881	Never	1923	None	120 ft (37 m)
Sullivan's Island Range Front Light		Sullivan's Island	N/A	1848 (First); 1872 (Last)	Never	Unknown (Removed)	None	Unknown
Sullivan's Island Range Rear Light	N/A	Sullivan's Island	N/A	1848 (First); 1872 (Last)	Never	Unknown (Removed)	None	120 ft (37 m)

== Notes ==
A. This lighthouse was built in honor of South Carolina's governors. It is privately maintained and an unofficial aid to navigation.
B. The deactivation date for the Haig Point Range Lights is disputed among sources. Click on the article for more information.
C. Not much is known about this set of range lights. The two structures were built in 1871 after the second Morris Island lighthouse was destroyed in the civil war, as navigation was needed in the area.
D. Listed on the light list as late as 1898.
