= Parris Island Range Lights =

Lighthouses in South Carolina, US

- Location: Parris Island, South Carolina, United States
- Coordinates: 32°18′46″N 80°40′39″W

Tower
- Constructed: 1881
- Parris Island front range light
- Construction: lumber
- Height: 45 ft (14 m)
- Shape: square
- First lit: 1881
- Deactivated: 1912
- Parris Island rear range light
- Construction: iron
- Height: 132 ft (40 m)
- Shape: triangle
- First lit: 1881
- Deactivated: 1912
- Focal height: 120 ft (37 m)
- Lens: Steamer lens

The Parris Island Range Lights were range lights on the southern end of Parris Island in Beaufort County, South Carolina. The Parris Range Lights were first lit in 1881. They were deactivated in 1912. Only the lens house for the Rear Light remains, which is the oldest building at Parris Island.

Parris Island is on Port Royal Sound south of main portion of the city of Port Royal. It is best known as the home of the Marine Corps Recruit Depot Parris Island. The range lights on the Recruit Depot south of the airfield.

== Range Lights ==
In 1878, the U.S. Congress authorized range lights on Parris Island. These were to be used with the Hilton Head Range Lights to guide ships coming into Port Royal Sound.

The Front Range Light was a 45 feet (14 m) tall, wooden tower with square cross section and four legs. The watch room beneath the lantern was enclosed. To compensate for any shifts in the channel, the front light could be moved.

The front light suffered from erosion and storm damage. Its foundation was replaced in 1892. In 1900 and 1902 the U.S. Lighthouse Board's Annual Report indicated that it would have to be moved back. It is possible that the front light was moved back prior to deactivation.

The Rear Light was a 132 feet (40 m) tall triangular, iron skeletal tower, manufactured by the Cooper Manufacturing of Mount Vernon, Ohio. John Michael Doyle, who was an employee of the manufacturer, supervised the erection of the tower on a concrete foundation. Doyle later supervised the erection of the shorter Bloody Point Rear Range Light. He also became the first light keeper at Bloody Point. A brick lamp house, which was also called a lens house, was built at the base of the tower to house the lamp during the day. At night, the locomotive or steamer lamp with parabolic reflector was raised on rails to a height of 120 feet (37 m). The Parris Island Range Lights were lit in 1881.

A wooden walkway was built to connect the lights. The keeper's house was built about midway between the front and rear light.
