= Bloody Point, South Carolina =

Community in South Carolina, US

Coordinates: 32.09181°N 80.872507°W

Bloody Point is a residential community on the southernmost tip of Daufuskie Island, South Carolina, United States. It is bordered by the Atlantic Ocean on one side and the Mungen River on the other.

== History ==
Bloody Point was a part of the land settled by European colonists in the late 17th and early 18th centuries. It was the site of a violent battle in 1715, during the Yemassee War. After the island had been divided up by Europeans in the 18th century, the Spanish began to grow uncomfortable having the English so close to their Florida settlements. As a result, they began to encourage and reward Yemassee Indians and other local tribes for undertaking raids on the Daufuskie colonists' settlements. During one such raid, the beaches on the southernmost tip of Daufuskie ran red with blood, earning it the title "Bloody Point". Bloody Point served as the battleground for three separate skirmishes before the American Revolutionary War. The Native Americans ultimately lost these battles and their land, which led to the plantation era on Daufuskie. Through the 18th and 19th centuries, Daufuskie was the site of twelve farming plantations, known for their ability to produce a rare kind of cotton, Sea Island Cotton. When cotton crops were wiped out in 1922, oystering became the main industry on Daufuskie. Few residents lived on Bloody Point at this time.

In the 1980s, developers began to regard Daufuskie, as having potential for oceanfront communities. The year 1984 marked the purchase of central and southern land on Daufuskie by Hilton Head businessmen, which resulted in the development of Bloody Point and Melrose, as well as the creation of the Melrose Company. Bloody Point and Melrose became the sites for two golf courses and resorts. The Bloody Point Course was originally constructed in 1991, with a design by Tom Weiskopf and Jay Morrish. Both courses eventually fell into bankruptcy and disrepair. Bloody Point was closed from 2008 to 2011. Purchased by a new owner in 2011, Bloody Point Golf Club is facing a total overhaul of its facilities. The Davis Love Design Group is currently redesigning and restoring the golf course. Thirty-two oceanfront villas have been built at the northern end of Bloody Point, and 110 lots border the ocean, the Mungen River, or the Bloody Point Golf Course. What was once the Daufuskie Island Resort's Breathe Spa is being converted into the Bloody Point Inn.

== Historical sites ==
Bloody Point is also the home of several historic places, such as Bloody Point Range Lights and the Silver Dew Winery. The Range Lights constructed around 1883. The position of this range light, coupled with that of Haig Point, helped ensure safe passage of ships to the port of Savannah. The Silver Dew Winery, built in 1883, originated as a part of the lighthouse structure and became the first licensed winery in South Carolina. Papy Burn, the last assistant keeper of the lighthouse, lived there for over forty years, and fermented fruit to make small amounts of wine for his friends.
