= Sallie Ann Robinson =

American author, chef, historian

Sallie Ann Robinson is an American cookbook author, celebrity chef, and cultural historian. A native of Daufuskie Island, South Carolina, she is noted for her knowledge of Gullah traditions and history.

== Early life ==
Robinson was born on Daufuskie Island before natives began selling their ancestral land to private corporations and individuals in the 1960s and began moving inland to surrounding areas in South Carolina, Georgia, Florida, and elsewhere. While she is an author in her own right, Robinson's literary debut actually came as the character named Ethel in Pat Conroy’s classic memoir, The Water Is Wide. She was among the students Conroy taught on Daufuskie Island and maintained a friendship with the author as an adult. Before Conroy's death in 2016, the two sometimes made joint appearances at literary events. Members of Robinson's family are also featured in Daufuskie Island, A Photographic Essay by Jeanne Moutoussamy-Ashe.

Robinson now runs a tour company on Daufuskie Island and offers Gullah perspective on the island.

== Published works ==
Robinson's published titles have been acclaimed for the author's mixture of authentic Gullah recipes, home remedies, folklore, memoir, and documentation of the Gullah dialect spoken by island natives. To date, they include the following:

- Gullah Home Cooking the Daufuskie Way (ISBN 0807827835, University of North Carolina Press, 2003)
- Cooking the Gullah Way, Morning, Noon, and Night (ISBN 0807831506, University of North Carolina Press, 2007)
- Sallie Ann Robinson's Kitchen from the Lowcountry and Family Lore (ISBN 9780813056296, University of Florida 2019
- Image of America DAUFUSKIE ISLAND (ISBN 9781467127684 2019
