= Slaughter Pen (disambiguation) =

Slaughter Pen may refer to battle locations where, as with an animal killing area at a slaughterhouse, military troops with little defense are "caught in a slaughter pen on some disastrous field with a sacrifice" in a short period:

- Slaughter Pen (Cold Harbor), during the Battle of Cold Harbor
- Slaughter Pen (Gettysburg Battlefield), during the Battle of Gettysburg
- Slaughter Pen (Stones River), during the Battle of Stones River
- Slaughter Pen Farm (Fredericksburg and Spotsylvania National Military Park), a 208 acres (0.84 km^{2})
- Floating Battery of Charleston Harbor, nicknamed "the slaughter pen"
