= Haig Point Club =

Private community on Daufuskie Island, South Carolina

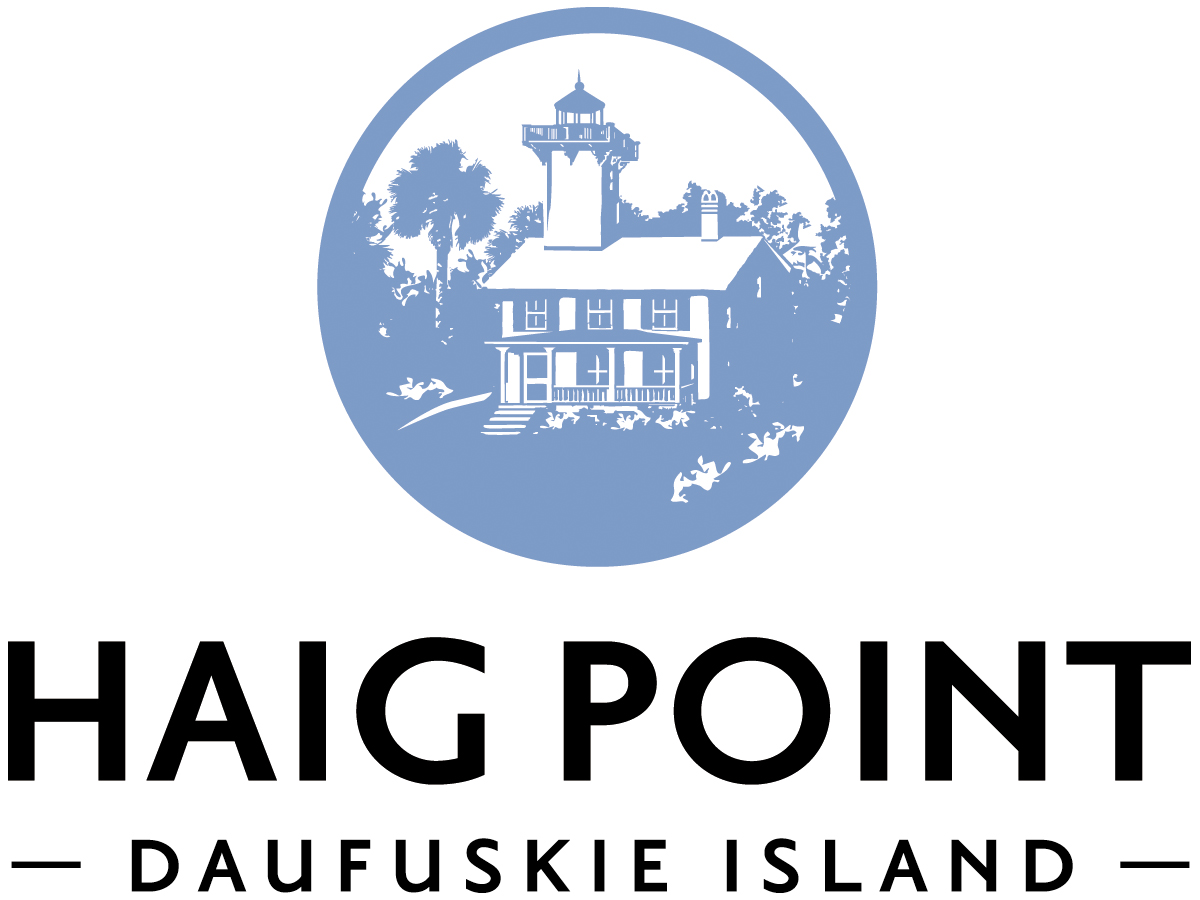
- Type: Private
- Founded: 1986
- Headquarters: Daufuskie Island, South Carolina, U.S.
- Parent: Haig Point Club and Community Association, Inc.

Haig Point is a private 1,050-acre (4.2 km^{2}) community on Daufuskie Island, South Carolina, in the United States. Commonly referred to just as Haig Point, it is legally known as The Haig Point Club and Community Association Inc. Founded in 1986 by International Paper, it has been owned by its members since 2001 and members-operated since 2009.

Haig Point is critically acclaimed, being often placed highly in rankings of golf course communities.

== History ==
=== Pre-settlement (8,000 BC–1711 AD) ===
Native American Indians occupied Daufuskie Island for thousands of years. Many artifacts have been found at Haig Point dating back to this time. Tabby ruins still exist on the property, dating back to the Colonial period, and have been carefully preserved. Other artifacts are kept on display in the Strachan Mansion.

=== Haig era (1711–1810) ===
In 1711, James Cockran, an Indian trader and planter, acquired 500 acres (2.0 km^{2}) of Haig Point (not yet called such). Five years later, the property was left to Richard Cockran Ash, who sold it to Archibald Niele in 1735. Having never occupied the property, Niele sold it to George Haig I later in the same year. Following Haig's death, Haig Point was left to George Haig III in 1790. In 1810, Haig put the property up for sale. While this was the end for the Haig family at Haig Point, the property is called Haig Point to this day.

=== Expansion era (1810–1850) ===
Haig III sold Haig Point to John David Mongin for his son, David John Mongin in 1810. Sometime between 1810 and 1823 the Mongins acquired the 600-acre (2.4 km^{2}) Freeport Plantation. This created the nearly 1,100-acre (4.5 km^{2}) plantation now known as Haig Point. Having died in 1823, David John Mongin left Haig Point to his wife Sarah. Two years later she married Reverend Herman Blodgett. Sarah Mongin Blodgett died in 1833 and Rev. Blodgett bought Haig Point from the Mongin family. After remarrying and starting construction on a new plantation house, Blodgett eventually sold Haig Point to William (Squire) Pope of Hilton Head Island.

=== Confiscation and reacquisition (1861–1980) ===
In 1861, due to tax issues, Haig Point was confiscated by the U.S. Government. Five years later, Pope's heirs paid the taxes and reclaimed Haig Point. In 1872, the Popes sold the historic Haig Point Lighthouse and the 5 acres (20,000 m^{2}) around it to the U.S. Government. Nearing the turn of the century in 1899, William Scouten bought Haig Point from the Popes for $2,500. The property stayed in the Scouten family for 58 years until in 1957 it was sold to Stiles Harper of Estill, SC for $44,000. Harper sold it to George "Pete" Bostwick for $134,000. Bostwick then bought back the famous Haig Point Lighthouse from the U.S. Government. Drawing this chapter of Haig Point history to a close, Charles Cauthen and Daufuskie Island Land Trust bought Haig Point, the Webb Tract and Oak Ridge for $2,875,000.

=== International Paper era (1984–2001) ===
In 1984, International Paper bought Haig Point from Charles Cauthen and the Daufuskie Island Land Trust for $8,453,328.18. Two years later, International Paper had set up extensive infrastructure, the lighthouse had been restored, and Rees Jones had built the initial golf course. Also at this time (1986), the Strachan Mansion was moved from St. Simons Island, Georgia to Haig Point. The mansion essentially was given away to International Paper by the Sea Island Company as they wanted the Mansion removed. The mansion was barged up the Intracoastal Waterway and restored to its present state.

=== Member-owned era (since 2001) ===
In 2001, International Paper transferred all of the common property and amenities to the members of Haig Point. The golf course and other amenities were operated on behalf of the HPCCA by Troon Golf until the end of 2008. Since 2009, it is member-operated under the traditional model of a private club.

== Geography ==
Haig Point is located on the northeast end of Daufuskie Island. The island is one of the southernmost sea islands in South Carolina with both Hilton Head Island (to the northeast) and Savannah, GA (to the southwest) only a short distance away. Daufuskie Island is not attached to the mainland and can only be reached by ferry.

To the east lies Calibogue Sound and Hilton Head Island; to the south is the Daufuskie Island Resort at Melrose and the Atlantic Ocean; to the west there is the Webb Tract and the mainland; and finally, to the north lies the Intracoastal Waterway and Bull Creek.

Haig Point and all of Daufuskie Island experiences large tides that can swallow and reveal large portions of the beach and vast tidal marsh.

Haig Point has also preserved many of the oyster beds that line the Atlantic side of the island.

== Golf club ==
Haig Point Golf Club
- Interactive map of Haig Point Golf Club
- 32.128088°N 80.8465°W

Club information
- Location: Daufuskie Island, South Carolina, U.S.
- Established: 1986
- Type: Private
- Owner: HPCCA
- Operator: member-operated
- Total holes: 29
- Website: HaigPoint.com

Signature Course
- Designed by: Rees Jones
- Par: 72
- Length: 7380
- Course rating: 76.6

Osprey Course
- Designed by: Rees Jones
- Par: 36 (9 holes)
- Length: 3,595
- Course rating: 37.6

The Haig Point golf amenity consists of 29 holes of golf, a two-way driving range, two practice greens and a clubhouse.

=== Signature course ===
Haig Point features the 20-hole Rees Jones Signature Course, an innovative and original design that launched Jones' solo career. The course is set along the Calibogue Sound and features two distinct routings: the Haig, which has fewer forced carries, and the Calibogue, which is more challenging. Many holes have different playing angles depending on the selected routing, while two of the par-3s have entirely separate holes, thus creating a 20-hole course. The course opened in 1986 to immediate critical acclaim, underwent renovations by Jones, and reopened in late 2007. These renovations received praise from Golf Digest and are part of Haig Point Club's long-range strategic plan.

=== Osprey course ===
The Osprey is Haig Point's 9-hole golf course (giving Haig Point 29 holes of private Rees Jones golf). The Osprey is geared more toward relaxed family play or a quick outing.

== Amenities ==
=== Beach club ===
The club's Calibogue Club is located along the beach on Haig Point's "Outer Banks." It overlooks the Calibogue Sound, a major waterway connecting the Intracoastal Waterway to the Atlantic Ocean, with the Harbour Town lighthouse visible in the distance. While the original Beach Club has a pool, bar and barbecue, the Calibogue Club, opened in November 2008, is a separate but adjacent two-story structure with capacity for 160 diners.

=== Dining ===
Dining options include casual fare at the 30th Hole Grill in the Clubhouse, while the Calibogue Club offers waterfront dining for lunch and dinner.

=== Equestrian center ===
Haig Point has a private stabling facility that offers programs for all ages and abilities, including carriage rides and horseback riding. The center also offers lessons in English or Western seats. Pony rides are available for children.

== Strachan Mansion ==
The historic Strachan Mansion, moved from St. Simons Island via barge in 1986, serves as a guesthouse with a bar and billiards room.

== Lighthouse ==
The Haig Point Lighthouse was built in 1873. Open for private tours when not occupied, it is currently used as a guesthouse as well as a venue for weddings, receptions and special events.

== Ferry company ==
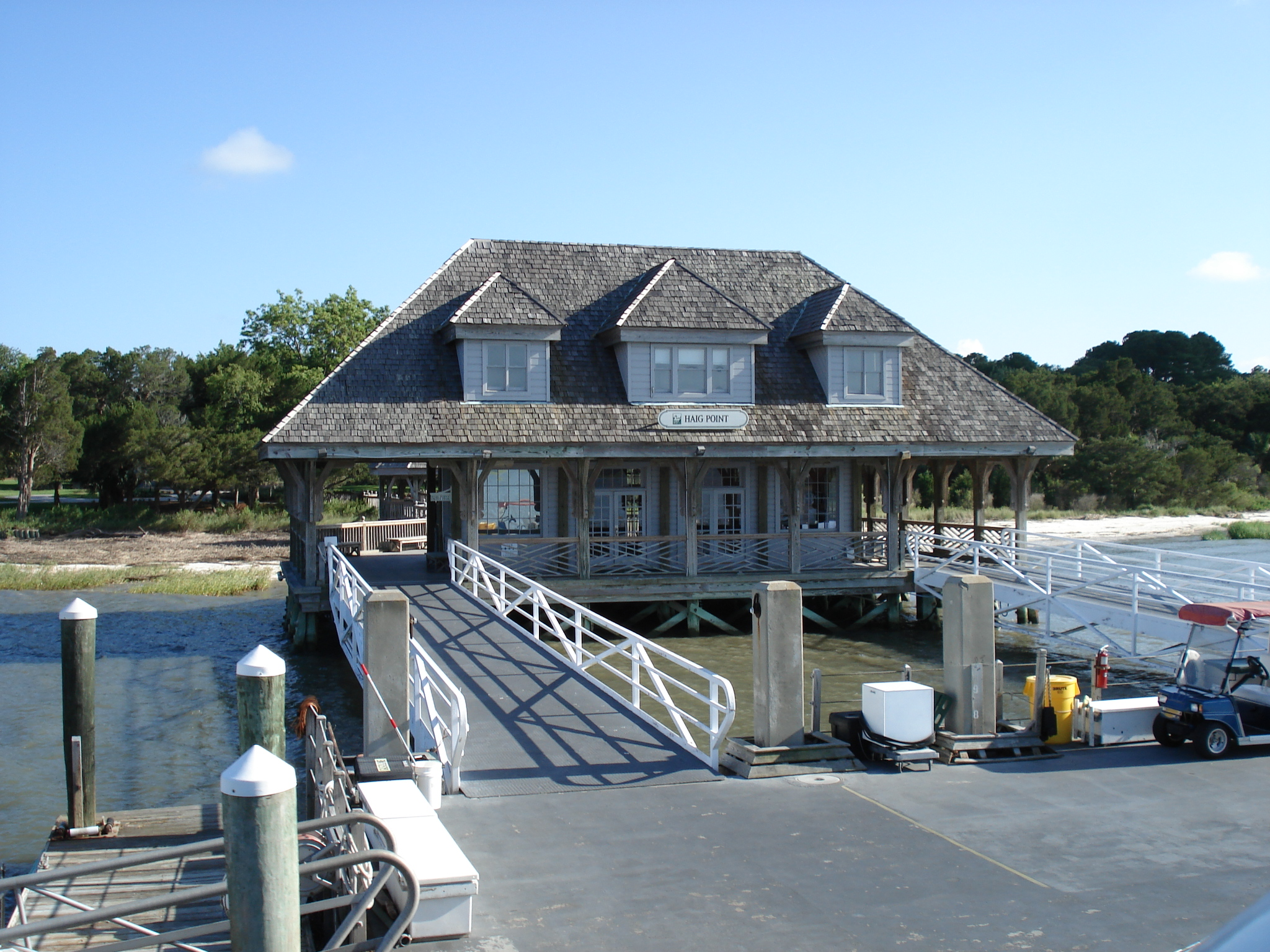
Haig Point Private Ferry terminal and dock at Daufuskie

Haig Point has its own private ferry company that transports its members, their guests, and employees to and from Daufuskie and Hilton Head Island. The Embarkation Center on Hilton Head serves as both a ferry terminal and parking lot, as no cars are allowed in Haig Point – members and guests travel via golf cart or bicycle.

The Haig Point Ferry Company has three large ferries (Haig Point I, II and IV), and one smaller water taxi (Haig Point III). In 2007, as a part of the club's long-range strategic plan, the Haig Point IV (with a capacity of 100 persons, including crew) was built and is now an active part of the fleet.

== Wildlife ==
Haig Point is home to a variety of different animals including deer, eagles, osprey, falcons, squirrels, lizards, snakes, armadillos, alligators and many different types of fish and sharks.

== Popular culture ==
Haig Point was the first golf course and golf course community featured in the first publication of Links Magazine (then titled Southern Links), the March/April 1988 issue. Links also featured the Palm Beach Polo Golf and Country Club and an interview with Gary Player in this first issue. Celebrating its 20th anniversary, Links featured Haig Point again in its July/August 2008 publication. The eighth hole "Calibogue" green of Haig Point's Signature Course was featured on the cover of the July/August 2008 issue.

Pat Conroy's book The Water Is Wide is a recounting of the year (1969) he spent as a teacher on Daufuskie Island teaching at the Mary Field School. With contributions from Haig Point members, other Daufuskie residents and various Lowcountry organizations, the school has been preserved as a community center.

== Awards ==
- Ranked on "America's 100 Greatest Golf Courses" by Golf Digest, 1986–2000
- Ranked among the "Top 100 Courses in the World" by Golf Magazine
- Ranked on "America's Best Top 100 Residential Courses" by Golfweek Magazine, 2005-2009
- Named a "Top 10 Best, Private-equity, Country Club in America" by The Golfer magazine
- One of "America's 100 Premier Properties" by the editors of Links Magazine and cited as "Best for Golf" 2006/2007 & 2007/2008.
