= Conrack =

1974 film by Martin Ritt

- 1974 Promotional Poster for Conrack
- Directed by: Martin Ritt
- Screenplay by: Harriet Frank Jr. Irving Ravetch
- Based on: The Water Is Wide by Pat Conroy
- Produced by: Martin Ritt; Harriet Frank Jr.
- Starring: Jon Voight; Paul Winfield; Hume Cronyn
- Cinematography: John A. Alonzo
- Edited by: Frank Bracht
- Music by: John Williams
- Distributed by: 20th Century Fox
- Release date: March 15, 1974 (Los Angeles)
- Running time: 106 minutes
- Country: United States
- Language: English
- Budget: $2.37 million
- Box office: $2 million (rentals)

Conrack is a 1974 American drama film based on the 1972 autobiographical book The Water Is Wide by Pat Conroy, directed by Martin Ritt and starring Jon Voight in the title role, alongside Paul Winfield, Madge Sinclair, Hume Cronyn and Antonio Fargas. The film was released by 20th Century Fox on March 15, 1974.

The novel was remade as The Water Is Wide in 2006, a Hallmark Hall of Fame TV movie starring Jeff Hephner and Alfre Woodard.

== Plot ==
The story follows a young teacher, Pat Conroy, in 1969 assigned to isolated Yamacraw Island (Daufuskie Island) off the coast of South Carolina and populated mostly by poor black families. He finds out that the children as well as the adults have been isolated from the rest of the world and speak a dialect called Gullah, with "Conrack" of the novel's title being the best they can do to pronounce his last name. The school has only two rooms for all grades combined, with the principal teaching grades one through four and Conroy teaching grades five through eight. Conroy discovers that the students aren't taught much and will have little hope of making a life in the larger world.

Conroy tries to teach them about the outside world but comes into conflict both with the principal and Mr. Skeffington, the superintendent. He teaches them how to brush their teeth, who Babe Ruth is, and has the children listen to music, including Flight of the Bumblebee and Beethoven's Fifth Symphony. He explains that when Beethoven wrote the Fifth Symphony, he was writing about "what death would sound like". He is astounded they've never even heard of Halloween, and he decides to take them to Beaufort on the mainland to go trick-or-treating, which the superintendent has forbidden. He also must overcome parental fears of "the river." As a result, he's fired. As he leaves the island for the last time, the children come to see him leave, all of them lined up on a rickety bridge. As he is about to leave by boat, one of the students then begins playing a record, which is the beginning movement of Beethoven's Fifth Symphony.

== Cast ==
- Jon Voight as Pat Conroy
- Paul Winfield as Mad Billy
- Madge Sinclair as Mrs. Scott
- Tina Andrews as Mary
- Antonio Fargas as Quickfellow
- Ruth Attaway as Edna
- James O'Rear as Postman
- Hume Cronyn as Mr. Skeffington

== Production ==
This film was shot mostly on Saint Simons Island, Georgia at what was then known as Taylor's Fish Camp and also in nearby Brunswick, Georgia and used pupils from C.B. Greer Elementary school as the cast of students.

Tommy Tedesco played guitar on the introduction theme.

== Reception ==
=== Box office ===
On a budget of $2.37 million, Conrack grossed $2 million in the United States and Canada.

=== Critical response ===
On Rotten Tomatoes, the film has an approval rating of 67% based on 15 reviews.

Nora Sayre of The New York Times wrote that "despite Mr. Voight's skill, the teacher's character never jells... Another weakness is the glaze of sentimentality that sugars much of the narrative." The review in Variety stated, "Its computerized warmth may make 'Conrack' seem a bit self-congratulatory at times, but at least its creative participants deserve outsiders' congrats for translating hokum into potentially viable b.o. fodder." Gene Siskel of the Chicago Tribune gave the film three-and-a-half stars out of four and praised it as "an undeniably tender film full of affecting moments, genuine tension, and much good will. It's also one of those rare film commodities: a nice family picture." Charles Champlin of the Los Angeles Times wrote, "Conrack has Voight's commanding characterization as its center, and those kids, and a strong visual sense throughout. And in its warm concern for human values, it is beyond question a welcome alternative to the hard-edge melodramas which have been conspicuous in recent times. The disappointment is that to achieve a sentimental optimism, it is felt necessary to create a world which, however real it looks and sounds, turns out to be make-believe at its center." Gary Arnold of The Washington Post called it "an unusually decent and appealing adventure, a commercial entertainment that also reflects the best of human and social intentions. One trusts that it will be a popular film, and it deserves to be." John Raisbeck of The Monthly Film Bulletin wrote "With its lingering long shots, Conrack is a constant visual delight; but for all its craftsman-like virtues, it seems a conscious turning aside from the complexities of modern cinema to the simpler alternatives of yesteryear. Indeed, with underprivileged white children instead of black and Greer Garson substituting for Jon Voight, the film might have been made all of thirty years ago."

=== Release ===
The film was released on VHS and DVD in 2001. Twilight Time released a limited edition (3,000 copies) Blu-ray version of the film in 2014.

== See also ==
- List of American films of 1974
- List of drama films of the 1970s
- Daufuskie Island
- Sea Islands
- The Water Is Wide
