= Fort Ripley Shoal Light =

Lighthouse in South Carolina, US

- Location: NNW of Fort Sumter in Charleston, South Carolina harbor approaches
- Coordinates: 32.766°N 79.902°W (approx.)

Tower
- Foundation: screw-pile
- Construction: cast-iron/wood
- Height: 44 feet (13 m)
- Shape: hexagonal house

Light
- First lit: 1878
- Deactivated: 1932
- Lens: fifth order Fresnel lens
- Characteristic: fixed red

The Fort Ripley Shoal Light or Middle Ground Light was a lighthouse in the Charleston, South Carolina harbor approaches.

== History ==
The channels approaching Charleston fork shortly after passing Fort Sumter, split by a large shoal extending southeast from Shutes' Folly Island. The southern portion, known as the Middle Ground, was the site of the Civil War-era Fort Ripley, cobbled together on an artificial island. The fort has since slumped beneath the waves; it is now evidenced by nothing more than a daymark and notation of submerged rocks on nautical charts.

In 1878 a screw-pile lighthouse was erected a short distance from the remains of the fort, to mark the shoal. Little is recorded of its history, and it was deactivated and dismantled in 1932. However, a much larger skeleton tower was erected on the same site to replace the old rear light of the Fort Sumter Range. This tower remains in service, though it's unnamed on charts. It displays three lights: a pair at 166 and 170 feet (51 and 52 m) feet to present the day and night aspects of the range, and a third at 50 feet (15 m), to guide passing ships.
