= Bloody Point Range Lights =

Lighthouses in South Carolina, US

- Location: South Carolina, United States
- Coordinates: 32°05′49.7″N 80°52′23.5″W

Tower
- Constructed: 1883
- Construction: Wood
- Height: 27 feet (8.2 m) (Original Front); 91 feet (28 m) (Original Rear)
- Shape: Dormer window on roof of house
- Heritage: National Register of Historic Places contributing property

Light
- First lit: 1883
- Deactivated: 1922
- Focal height: 81 feet (25 m) (Original Rear)
- Lens: Red steamer lens (original front and rear), decorative (current)
- Bloody Point Lighthouse
- U.S. Historic district – Contributing property
- Part of: Daufuskie Island Historic District (ID82003831)
- Added to NRHP: June 2, 1982

The Bloody Point Range Lights, which is known as the Bloody Point Lighthouse, were range lights on the southern end of Daufuskie Island in Beaufort County, South Carolina. The Bloody Point Range Lights were built in 1883. Due to erosion, the front light was moved to the location of the former rear light and became the rear light. The lights were maintained as an official aid to navigation until 1922. The original Front Range Light house is currently a private home.

Bloody Point is the southern end of Daufuskie Island. It was given this name because of the blood shed during the Yamasee War of 1715.

== Original range lights ==
In 1871, the U.S. Congress authorized two sets of range lights on Daufuskie Island. The other range lights were the Haig Point Range Lights on the northern end of the island. In 1882, 6.72 acres (2.72 ha) was purchased for the Bloody Point lights.

The Front Range Light was a red, kerosene lamp placed in a gable-fronted dormer window of the lightkeeper's house. This house, which was built by James C. LaCoste, was located near the beach on 1.72 acres (7,000 m^{2}). The light was at a height of 27 feet (8.2 m).

The Rear Light was a 91-foot (28 m) tall triangular, iron skeletal tower, manufactured by the Cooper Manufacturing of Mount Vernon, Ohio. John Michael Doyle, who was an employee of the manufacturer, supervised the erection of the tower on a concrete foundation on 5 acres (2.0 ha) plot about 4,350 feet (1,330 m) inland of the front light. Doyle became the first light keeper. A brick lamp house, which was also called a wick house, was built at the base of the tower to house the lamp during the day. At night, the red steamer lamp with parabolic reflector was raised on rails to a height of 81 feet (25 m). The Bloody Point Range Lights were lit on 1883. A nearby brick oil house for storage of kerosene was also built.

== Later configuration ==
Due to erosion, the front light was moved in 1899 to a location near the rear light, which was dismantled. In its new position, it became the rear light. A 45 feet (14 m) tall wooden house on metal legs was placed on leased land near the shore. The metal legs rested on metal disks that could be slid across the beach as the channel shifted. This light was moved several times over the next twenty years. The range lights were deactivated in 1922.

In 1925, the lightkeeper house was sold. The front range light had already been lost due to erosion. The house was sold at auction and then sold to its last light keeper, Gus Ohman. In 1926, he sold it to a former assistant light keeper, Arthur A. "Papy" Burn, Jr., who lived there for about 40 years. In 1953, Papy Burn started making wine using blackberries, elderberries, scuppernongs, and other fruit in the lamp house and/or the oil house. Although wine making was a small operation, he called the building the Silver Dew Winery. Two small brick buildings with the sign for the Silver Dew Winery were described by Pat Conroy in his autobiographical book the Water is Wide.

In 1981, the house was renovated as a private home. The property was seized for back taxes owed and sold. It was purchased in an auction at the Beaufort County Courthouse in 1983. After serving as a temporary pro shop for a golf course, it is now a private residence.

The former Front Range House is a contributing property of the National Register of Historic Places' Daufuskie Island Historic District. The nomination form and an additional pictures are available from the South Carolina Department of Archives and History.
