= Combahee Bank Light =

Lighthouse in South Carolina, US

- Location: South Carolina, United States
- Coordinates: 32°28′N 80°26′W

Tower
- Constructed: 1868
- Construction: Screwpile
- Shape: Cottage

Light
- Deactivated: ca. 1876

The Combahee Bank Lighthouse is a former lighthouse in St. Helena Sound on the border of Beaufort and Colleton Counties in South Carolina. It was built in 1868 and abandoned around 1876.

The lighthouse was a cottage-style screwpile lighthouse that was built to warn of shoals. It was near the location of the current automated light, which is on a dolphin.

In 1902, a daymark was put on the old structure. Due to settling, the daymark was replaced with a lighted buoy in 1913. Most of the old structure was removed in 1925 by a buoy tender's derrick.
