= Daufuskie Island =

Census-designated place in South Carolina, United States

- Daufuskie Island Historic District
- U.S. National Register of Historic Places
- U.S. Historic district
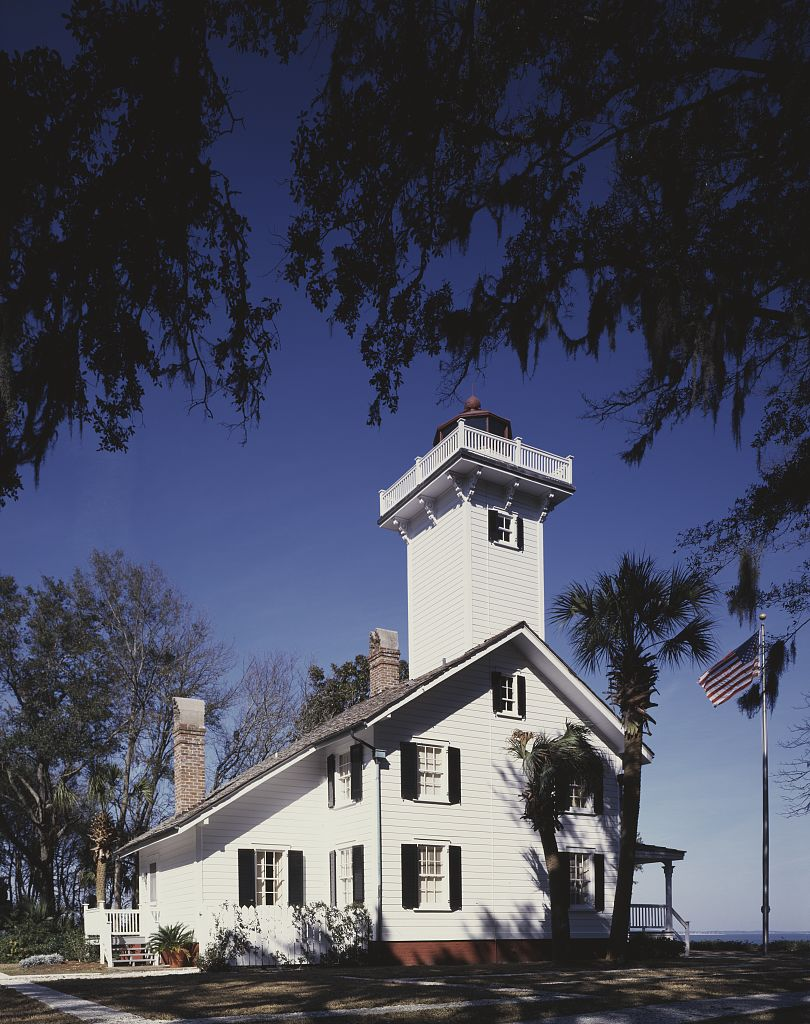
- Haig Point Rear Range Light

- Location within South Carolina Location within the United States
- Nearest city: Hilton Head, South Carolina
- Coordinates: 32°6′47″N 80°51′59″W
- Built: 1728
- Architectural style: Greek Revival
- NRHP reference No.: 82003831
- Added to NRHP: June 2, 1982

Daufuskie Island, located between Hilton Head Island and Savannah, is the southernmost inhabited sea island in South Carolina. It is 5 miles (8 km) long by almost 2.5 miles (4.0 km) wide – approximate surface area of 8 square miles (21 km^{2}) (5,000 acres). With over 3 miles (5 km) of beachfront, Daufuskie is surrounded by the waters of Calibogue Sound, the Intracoastal Waterway and the Atlantic Ocean. It was listed as a census-designated place in the 2020 census with a population of 557.

Accessible only by ferry or barge, and with a full-time population of just over 400, Daufuskie Island contains environmental preserves, private communities, resorts, Gullah houses, diverse art galleries and history. The island was named a historic district on the National Register of Historic Places due to its Gullah and Civil War history. The island is also the setting of Pat Conroy's memoir The Water Is Wide recounting Conroy's experiences teaching on Daufuskie in the late 1960s.

== History ==
Daufuskie Island has been inhabited for thousands of years, as evidenced by ancient piles of discarded oyster shells exhibiting pottery shards from all phases of the hunter-gathering period. Prior to European arrival numerous Indian tribes inhabited the Lowcountry and islands. Culturally and linguistically these tribes were of Muskogean stock. Daufuskie comes from the Muscogee language and means "sharp feather", for the island's distinctive shape.

As early as 1523, Spanish explorers were sailing the southeastern coast of North America in search of potential settlements. By 1565, the Spanish had settled in St. Augustine, Florida, and were pushing up the coast establishing and maintaining additional colonies. Concurrent with these 16th-century ambitions for settlement, the French also made attempts at colonization in South Carolina Lowcountry areas. By the mid-1600s the English began to explore the southern coast. Prosperous Caribbean planters sponsored several expeditions to South Carolina. Captain William Hilton and Robert Sandford both made voyages to Port Royal Sound and vicinity. In July 1666 Sandford entered Calibogue Sound between Hilton Head and Daufuskie.

It was during this period of early exploration that Spanish settlers introduced their distinctive Iberian horses to the Southeastern coast. Today the descendants of these horses are known as "Carolina Marsh Tacky". These sturdy, intelligent horses are particularly well adapted to the swampy and marshy lowcountry region. Examples of this rare breed can still be found on Daufuskie.

In 1684, Spanish soldiers enlisted the help of native warriors to fight Scottish settlers in Port Royal, and thus began the uneasy and difficult history of native entanglement in European settlement history. The inevitable clash of cultures culminated with the so-called Yamasee uprising that consisted of three brutal battles on the southwestern shore of Daufuskie Island between 1715 and 1717 that gave this piece of land the name it still bears today, Bloody Point.

The quest for religious freedom ultimately brought two European families to Daufuskie Island—the great-grandson of French Huguenot David Mongin, and the daughter of Italian Prince Filippo de Martinangelo who escaped the Inquisition. The story of these two founding families is intertwined throughout their long history, and both rose to become powerful island plantation owners.

The American Revolution brought divided loyalties to the lowcountry. Daufuskie received the nickname "Little Bermuda" during the Revolution due to the residents' Loyalist sentiments. After the Revolution, Daufuskie thrived with the introduction of world-famous sea island cotton, a variety prized by European mills. High quality, sea island cotton exceeded all other long-staple cottons in fiber length, as well as fineness and strength. It was during this period of strong economic growth that several large plantation mansions were constructed.

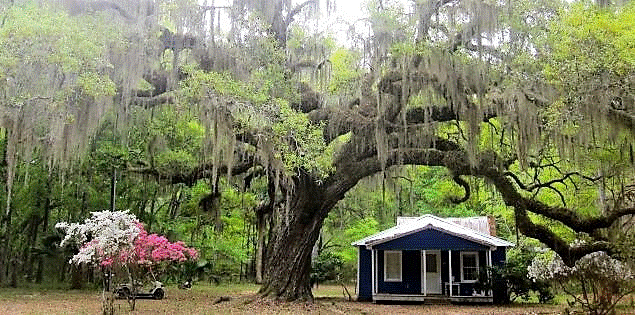
Iconic southern live oak with Spanish moss on Daufuskie

The building of American wooden tall ships triggered the demand for timber from live oak trees abundant on Daufuskie. This hardwood species, unique to the southeastern coast, was prized by shipbuilders for its strength and resistance to rot, as well as its naturally curved limbs. Daufuskie was in the center of the "live oaking" trade crucial to the development of US maritime power. Shipwrights traveled to Daufuskie and the lowcountry to fell the oaks, hew them, and lug the pieces by oxen to coastal landings. The USS Constitution—"Old Ironsides"—was constructed with live oak.

Prior to the Civil War, there were eleven plantations on Daufuskie. Large homes were constructed on several of these tracts – Oakley Hall at Bloody Point, Melrose, and Haig Point. The mansion at Haig Point was unique as it was built of tabby. It was the largest tabby domestic building erected in coastal South Carolina.

Introduced in the southeast by early Spanish settlers, tabby is a type of concrete made by burning oyster shells to create lime, then mixing it with water, sand, ash and broken oyster shells. Three of the best-preserved, tabby-walled single slave dwellings still standing in Beaufort County can be found today at Haig Point.

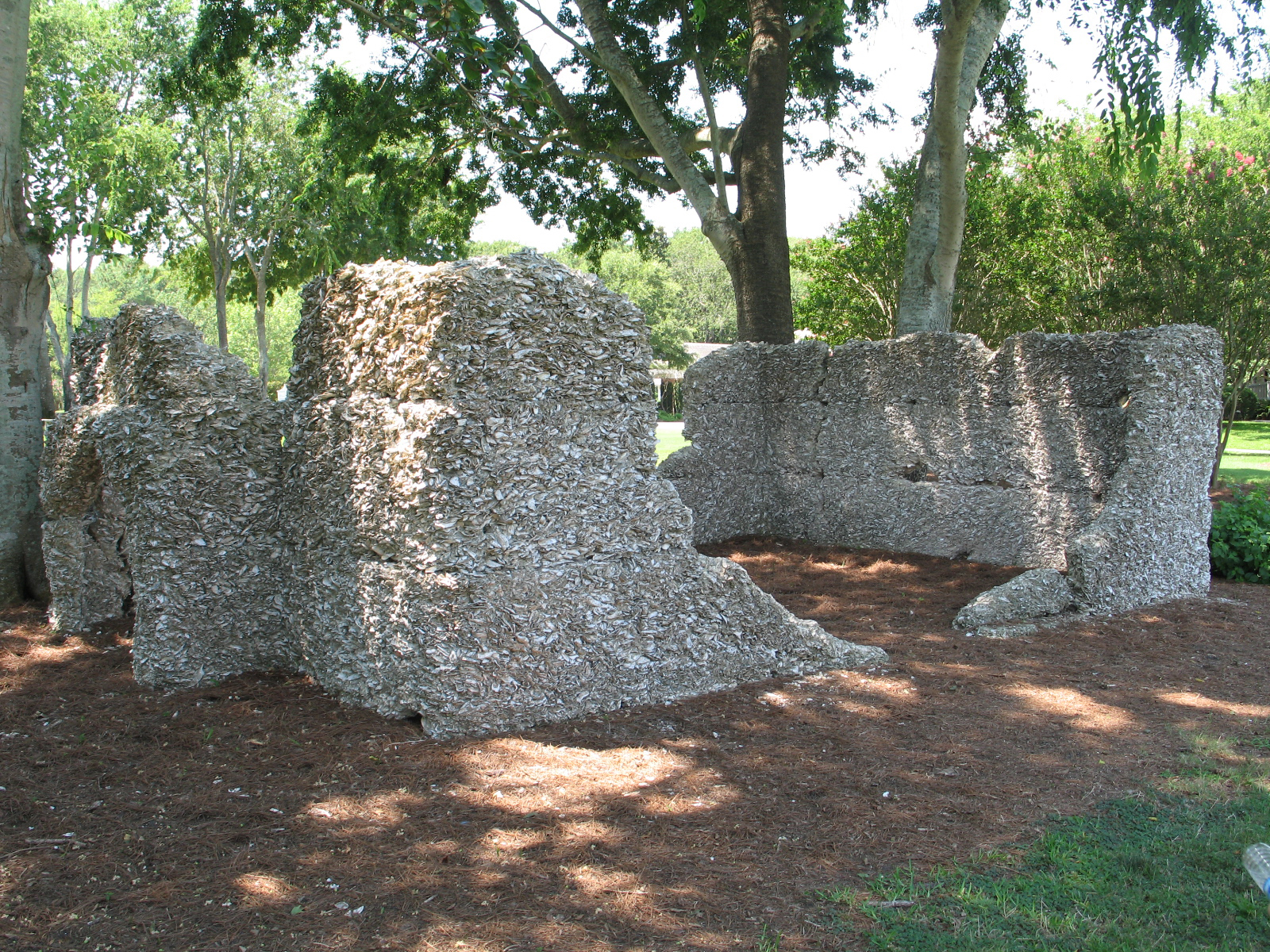
Remains of tabby slave quarters on Daufuskie Island

Early in the Civil War, Union forces occupied the Beaufort-area islands. Union troops on Daufuskie supported the siege and reduction of Fort Pulaski protecting the Savannah River entrance. This Union presence caused white plantation owners to flee, leaving property and slaves behind. After the war, Daufuskie's remoteness allowed Gullah culture to survive and flourish through the generations.

The Gullah language is a legacy of the original slaves and later laborers who remained once the plantations folded. The lowcountry was remote until the mid-20th century, but the isolation of Daufuskie created the perfect climate for the language and manners of the Gullah people to remain remarkably well preserved. The local dialect is heavily influenced by West African languages and rural English. Daufuskie is in the center of the Gullah/Geechee Cultural Heritage Corridor.

Following the Civil War the farming, mining, and timber industries were re-established in Beaufort County and the lowcountry. This activity meant the waterways around Daufuskie, with its critical position between Port Royal and Savannah, became very busy. Navigation aids became necessary to support the increased volume of shipping. In 1873 the Haig Point Range Lights were constructed on the island's northern end. This was followed by the Bloody Point Range Lights in 1883 built to assist ships approaching the Savannah River entrance.

From the 1880s the oyster industry flourished on Daufuskie. By the turn of the century the island had a population of 2,000-3,000, most of whom worked in this lucrative shellfish trade. The flat coastline, saltmarsh estuary, and natural oyster reefs, combined with a lengthy spawning season, make waters surrounding Daufuskie the perfect habitat for growing abundant clusters of meaty, briny oysters. Daufuskie oysters were known as far away as Bar Harbor and New York. It is reported that the Tsar of Russia preferred Daufuskie oysters.

Eventually, in the 1950s, pollution closed the oyster beds and the island's economy declined. Electricity came to the island in 1953 and telephones in 1972; however, with few opportunities for work, the population shrank to less than a hundred people, leaving a legacy of rich Gullah history. In the 1980s developers started making plans to make Daufuskie Island a residential development destination, and the planned developments of Bloody Point, Melrose, Haig Point, and Oakridge were born. Despite this progress and development, the island's historic district has remained untouched to preserve the Gullah culture, and today the entire island is on the National Register of Historic Places.

== Industry ==
The island's shoreline and tidal range are conducive to the lengthy spawning season of oysters. On the island, the oysters grow in clusters rather than individually. The natives of the island valued the natural abundance of oysters. Massive mounds of shucked oyster shells found on the island stand as testament to the extensive use of oysters on the island by its native residents. Native Americans used the meat of the oysters as food and used shells to fashion tools, fertilizers, and tabby. The oyster industry began on Daufuskie Island in the 1880s, when an Italian immigrant named Luigi Paolo Maggioni leased oyster beds and opened a raw shuck oyster house. Later in 1893, he opened the L.P. Maggioni and Company Oyster Factory. The factory harvested, shucked, steamed, and canned oysters to ship to Savannah. The success of the company brought several others to the island. Several shucking shacks and factories remained on the island after the L.P. Maggioni Company moved to Savannah, Georgia. The oyster industry flourished as people as far away as Bar Harbor and New York considered Daufuskie Island oysters a delicacy. “Daufuski” brand oysters with the distinctive Indian chief label were shipped worldwide, reportedly even enjoyed by Tsar Nicolas II of Russia. The 1930s depression and World War II caused the oyster industry to decline as many left the island for better job opportunities. The industry faced more setbacks as pollution from the Savannah River in the 1950s contaminated the island oyster beds. New wage and hour laws increased labor costs, resulting in the cannery closing after the 1986 spring season. Fortunately, mom-and-pop shops continue to sell oysters on the island.

== Locations ==
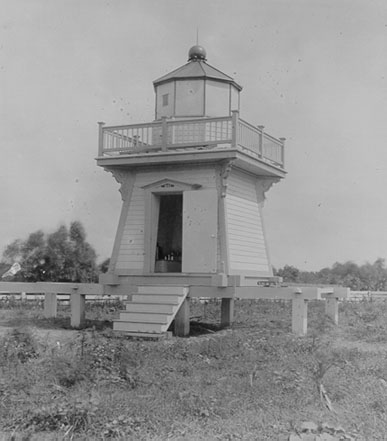
Haig Point Front Range Light Daufuskie Island

The island is now split into five parts.

To the northeast is the Haig Point Club, a private, member-owned residential club with around 150 year-round residents and over 225 homes.

South of Haig Point was the Melrose Resort and residential community. Farther south on the eastern side of the island is Oak Ridge, a small undeveloped oceanfront community, followed by Bloody Point, a semi-private residential community.

Melrose Resort remains in disrepair as of April 2019, and the former owner faces charges for using resort money to pay for his own expenses.

The western part of the island is unincorporated land. About 100 residents live in a variety of accommodations, from cabins and small houses to waterfront homes with private docks. This section of the island received federal designation as a historic district in the early 1980s. According to a study conducted by the Savannah College of Art and Design, the island has excellent examples of Gullah homes that have not been altered. There are descendants of the Gullah people living in this area on land which they have owned since just after the Civil War. The Historic District is also known for its artisan shops, "quirky restaurants" and one coffee shop (located in the Mary Fields School where author Pat Conroy once taught), wildlife and historic church. Most of the Historic District is traversed by historic winding dirt roads lined with Live Oaks, most of them looking very much the same as they did at least a century ago, including School Road, Benjie's Point, Prospect Road, Bryant Road, and Pappy's Landing.

A census in 2007 by the local Daufuskie Island Fire and Rescue Department counted a total of just 429 residents living full-time on the entire island. Rock musician John Mellencamp built a house on the island and uses it as a retreat.

== Demographics ==
Daufuskie Island
- Census-designated place
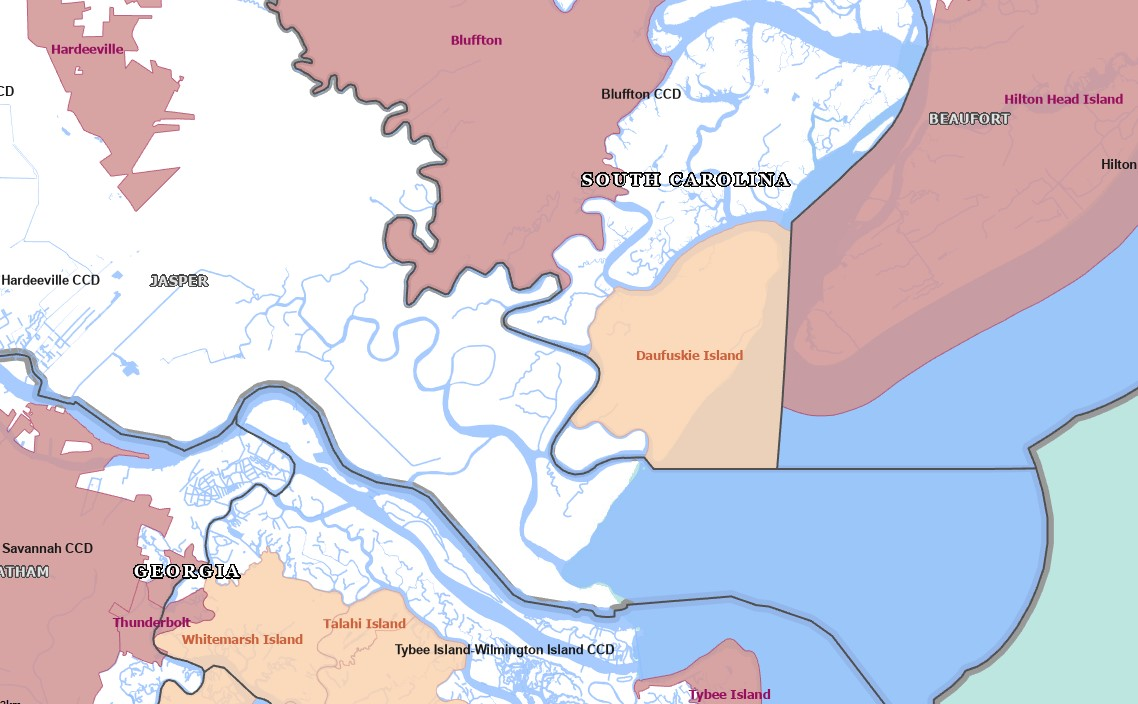
- Interactive map of Daufuskie Island
- Country: United States
- State: South Carolina
- County: Beaufort

Area
  - Total: 15.75 sq mi (40.78 km^{2})
  - Land: 9.81 sq mi (25.41 km^{2})
  - Water: 5.94 sq mi (15.38 km^{2})
- Elevation: 10 ft (3.0 m)

Population (2020)
  - Total: 557
  - Density: 56.8/sq mi (21.92/km^{2})
- Time zone: UTC-5 (Eastern (EST))
  - Summer (DST): UTC-4 (EDT)
- FIPS code: 45-18610
- GNIS feature ID: 2812931
- Website: www.daufuskieisland.com

Daufuskie Island is an unincorporated community and census-designated place in Beaufort County, in the U.S. state of South Carolina. In covers the population of Daufuskie Island, the southernmost inhabited sea island in South Carolina and a historic district on the National Register of Historic Places. It was first listed as a census-designated place (CDP) in the 2020 census with a population of 557.

Historical population
Census	Pop.	Note	%±
2020	557		—
U.S. Decennial Census; 2020

=== 2020 census ===
Daufuskie Island CDP, South Carolina – Racial and ethnic composition Note: the US Census treats Hispanic/Latino as an ethnic category. This table excludes Latinos from the racial categories and assigns them to a separate category. Hispanics/Latinos may be of any race.
Race / Ethnicity (NH = Non-Hispanic)	Pop 2020	% 2020
White alone (NH)	496	88.05%
Black or African American alone (NH)	14	2.51%
Native American or Alaska Native alone (NH)	0	0.00%
Asian alone (NH)	5	0.90%
Pacific Islander alone (NH)	0	0.00%
Other race alone (NH)	2	0.36%
Mixed race or Multiracial (NH)	21	3.77%
Hispanic or Latino (any race)	19	3.41%
Total	557	100.00%

== Culture and governance ==
The island is home to the First Union African Baptist Church, which is Daufuskie's oldest building, and is still in use today as a place of worship.

There are two historic lighthouses on Daufuskie Island: the Bloody Point Lighthouse, built in 1883, and the Haig Point Lighthouse, built ten years earlier.

The island is part of Beaufort County, South Carolina, and has an elected council. The Daufuskie Island Council serves as the official voice between Daufuskie and the county and other stakeholder groups.

Daufuskie had a long-standing tradition of self-governance, with the Beaufort County Sheriff's office responding only to emergencies. Due to an influx of tourism, the island requested a greater police presence to monitor visitors in 2018. The now-consistent police presence is resulting in an increased number of tickets and warnings for residents and visitors alike for golf cart registrations and open containers.

== Education ==
Daufuskie Island School is a Beaufort County public school built in 1997. It is a modern facility with two classrooms, lunchroom and library. The students are in multigrade classrooms: pre-K through 2nd grade and 3rd grade through 5th grade. Generally there are around 15-18 students each year, and the school has significant community support and many volunteers on the island.

Students in grades 6–12 are transported to Hilton Head Island Middle School and Hilton Head High School by a ferry. On Daufuskie, these students take a small school bus to the ferry. Once the students reach Hilton Head, they are picked up by a county school bus and taken to their appropriate school campus. The entire trip is about an hour and ten minutes each morning and afternoon. The students often do their homework or simply nap during the boat ride.

Daufuskie Island Independent School is a private school with grades 7 and 8.

== Transportation ==
No bridges connect Daufuskie Island with mainland South Carolina; therefore all island access must come by boat. A public ferry makes several daily transits between Buckingham Landing in the Bluffton area and Melrose Landing on Daufuskie.

Beaufort County provides a subsidized ferry that transports residents. The Haig Point Club has its own private ferry service. There are also several private companies that provide 25-30 minute water taxi services to the island. Residents of the clubs, as well as some of the other residents on the island, use golf carts and bicycles to travel around the island, although there are also some regular vehicles.

== Flora and fauna ==
The Daufuskie Island Conservancy is one of several local organizations charged with preserving the ecosystem, flora and fauna, and quality of life on Daufuskie Island.

Daufuskie Island boasts a wide variety of nature and animal life. One of the notable animals that inhabit the island is the fox squirrel. The bald eagle is also one of the creatures found on the island.

== Climate ==
Daufuskie Island has a humid subtropical climate with hot, humid summers and cool, refreshing winters.

Climate data for Daufuskie Island, South Carolina
Month	Jan	Feb	Mar	Apr	May	Jun	Jul	Aug	Sep	Oct	Nov	Dec	Year
Mean daily maximum °F (°C)	60 (16)	63 (17)	69 (21)	76 (24)	82 (28)	87 (31)	89 (32)	88 (31)	84 (29)	77 (25)	69 (21)	62 (17)	76 (24)
Mean daily minimum °F (°C)	39 (4)	41 (5)	47 (8)	54 (12)	62 (17)	69 (21)	72 (22)	72 (22)	68 (20)	57 (14)	48 (9)	41 (5)	56 (13)
Average precipitation inches (mm)	3.8 (97)	3.5 (89)	3.9 (99)	3.0 (76)	3.8 (97)	5.1 (130)	6.3 (160)	7.8 (200)	5.9 (150)	3.5 (89)	2.5 (64)	2.9 (74)	52.1 (1,320)
Source: Weatherbase

== Notable natives ==
- Sallie Ann Robinson

== In popular culture ==
The Jimmy Buffett song "Prince of Tides" (from his 1988 album Hot Water) laments the development of Daufuskie and loss of the Gullah culture.

Pat Conroy's 1972 book The Water Is Wide is set on Daufuskie, fictionalized as Yamacraw Island. The book recounts Conroy's experiences teaching on the island in 1969. The book won Conroy a humanitarian award from the National Education Association and an Anisfield-Wolf Book Award. The book was made into a feature film, Conrack, starring Jon Voight in 1974. The novel was also produced as The Water Is Wide in 2006, a Hallmark Hall of Fame TV movie starring Jeff Hephner.

One episode of the National Geographic Channel television series Diggers (S2, E10; 2013) featured professional treasure hunters Tim Saylor and George "KG" Wyant visiting Daufuskie seeking pirates' gold.

The March 2014 issue of Architectural Digest magazine featured the Daufuskie part-time home of singer John Mellencamp.

Travel + Leisure magazine designated restaurant Marshside Mama's, at the County Landing on Daufuskie, as one of the "Ten Best Beach Bars" in America.

The Travel Channel show Bizarre Foods America featured a segment with Daufuskie native Sallie Ann Robinson on a show (S1, E8; 2012) dedicated to Lowcountry and Gullah food and culture.

Bill Gunn's film Personal Problems (1980) centers around a nurse in Harlem who is originally from Daufuskie.
