= Castle Pinckney =

- U.S. National Register of Historic Places
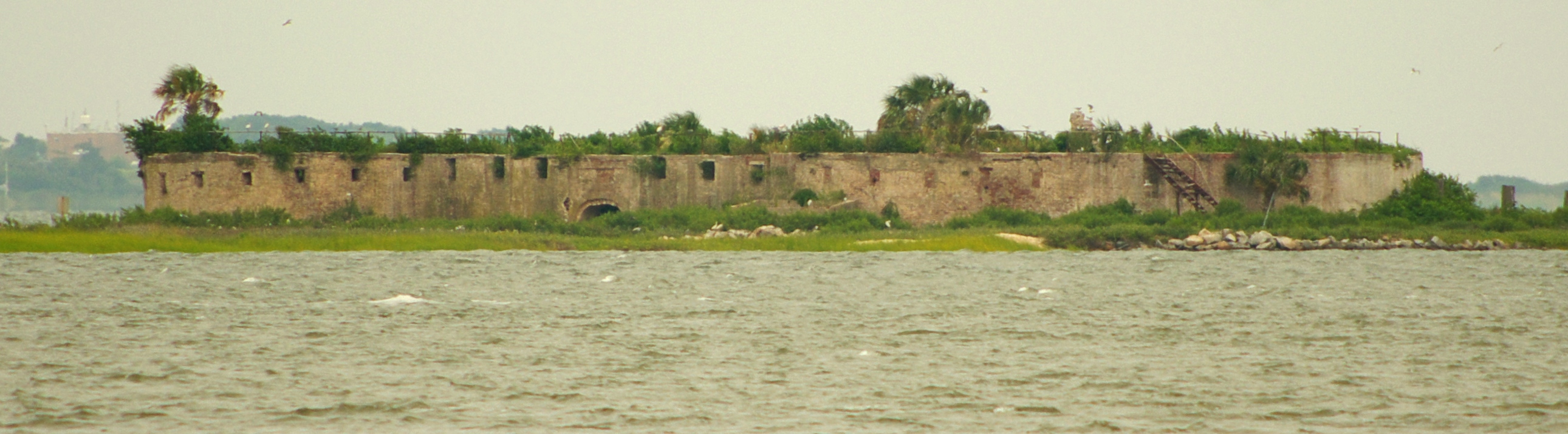
- View of Castle Pinckney, July 2012

- Location within South Carolina Location within the United States
- Nearest city: Charleston, South Carolina
- Coordinates: 32°46′25″N 79°54′41″W
- Built: 1810
- NRHP reference No.: 70000574
- Added to NRHP: July 16, 1970

Castle Pinckney is a small masonry fortification constructed by the United States government, in the harbor of Charleston, South Carolina, in 1810. It was used very briefly as a prisoner-of-war camp (six weeks) and artillery position during the American Civil War. It was named to the National Register of Historic Places in 1970.

== Early history ==
Located on Shutes Folly, a small island about one mile off the Charleston shore in the harbor, the fort was built over the ruins of an older fortification called "Fort Pinckney". The original log and earthen fort, named after the Revolutionary War hero Charles Cotesworth Pinckney, was built beginning in 1797 and was intended to protect the city from a possible naval attack when war with France seemed imminent. Completed in 1804, it saw no hostilities and was virtually destroyed by a severe hurricane in September of that year. A replacement brick-and-mortar structure called "Castle Pinckney" was erected in 1809–1810 and was garrisoned throughout the War of 1812, but it saw no action during the two-and-a-half-year conflict. Afterwards, Castle Pinckney was abandoned and fell into disrepair.

Two decades later, a sea wall was completed and the fort was re-garrisoned during the Nullification Crisis of 1832, when President Andrew Jackson prepared to collect a controversial tariff using military force if necessary. After that brief period of activity, the fort again fell into disuse and was primarily a storehouse for gunpowder and other military supplies.

Castle Pickney plan

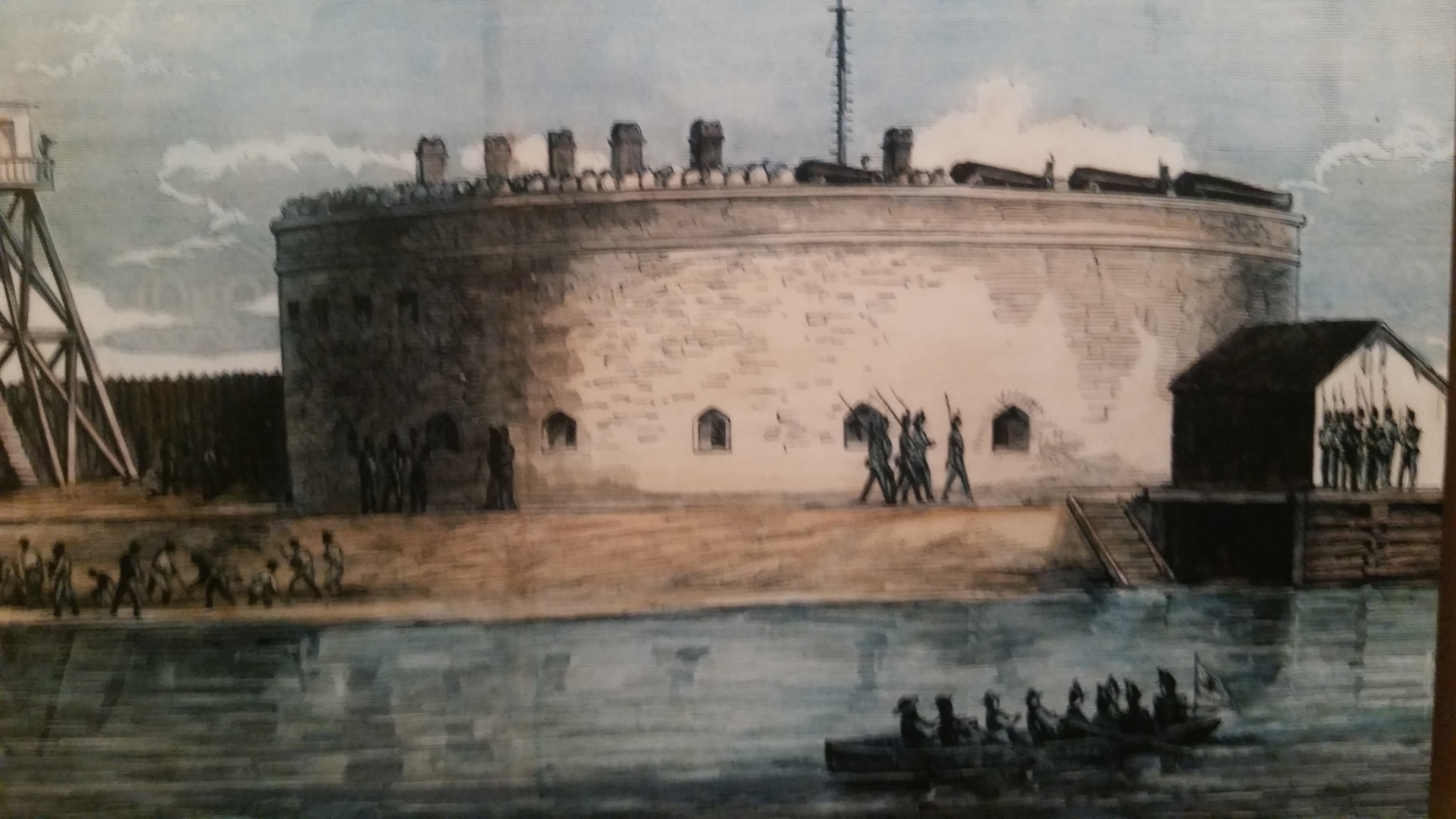
Fort Sumter National Monument marker for Castle Pinckney

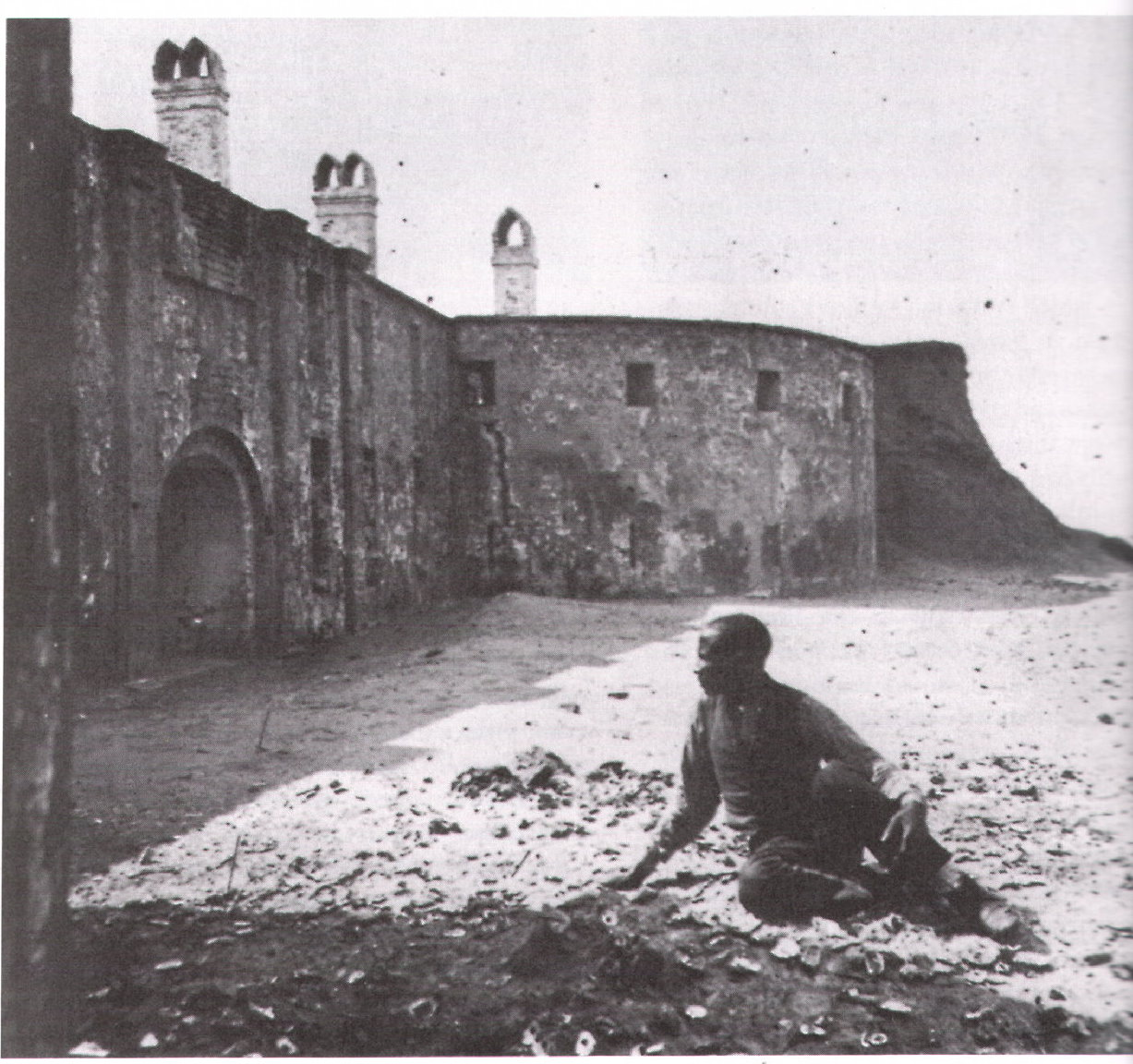
Castle Pinckney in 1861

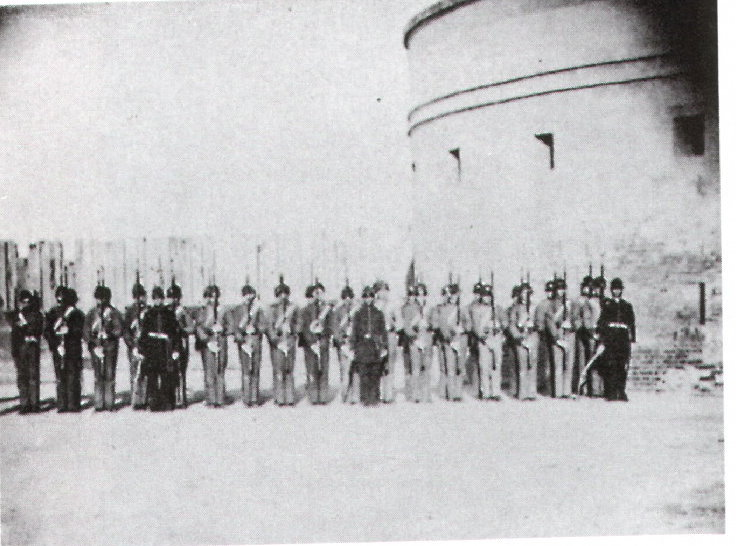
The Charleston Zouave Cadets in Castle Pinckney. For Id see .

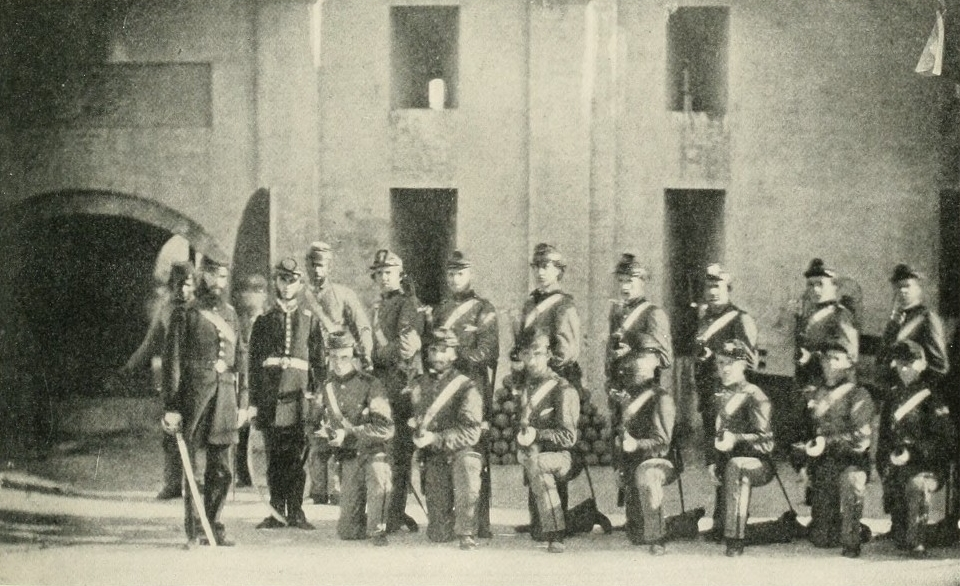
"Charleston's Famous Zouave Cadets drilling at Castle Pinckney."

By the late 1850s, Castle Pinckney was part of a network of defensive positions in the harbor, which included the larger and more strategically placed Forts Sumter and Moultrie, and other, smaller earthworks and fortifications. In 1860, Castle Pinckney's armament consisted of fourteen 24-pounders, four 42-pounders, four 8-inch howitzers, one 10-inch and one 8-inch mortar, and four light field pieces to protect its flanks.

== American Civil War ==
On December 27, 1860, one week after South Carolina seceded from the Union, the fort was surrendered to South Carolina (S.C.) militia by its small U.S. Army garrison, which retired to Fort Sumter to join Major Robert Anderson. Castle Pinckney became the first Federal military installation seized forcefully by a Southern state government. Three days later, the Union's Charleston Arsenal also fell to S.C. forces. After the subsequent Confederate attack on Fort Sumter, the Charleston Zouave Cadets garrisoned Castle Pinckney.

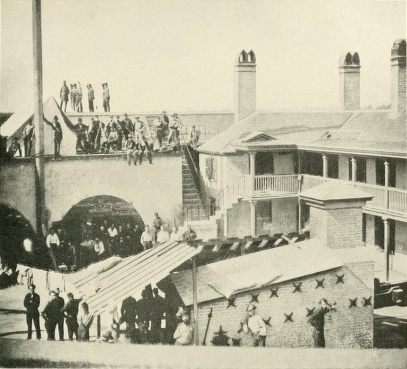
Federal prisoners captured at the First Battle of Bull Run were transported to Charleston S.C. and held inside a makeshift prison at Castle Pinckney. (photo August 1861)

One hundred and fifty-four Union Army prisoners of war (120 enlisted, 34 officers) captured during the First Battle of Bull Run and previously incarcerated at Ligon's Prison arrived at Charleston on September 10, 1861, and were kept at the Charleston City Jail until the lower casemates of Castle Pinckney were converted into cells. According to the Charleston Mercury, Richmond officials had selected "chiefly from among those who have evidenced the most insolent and insubordinate disposition." On September 18, prisoners from the 11th NY Fire Zouaves, 69th NY ("Irish") Regiment, 79th NY Regiment, and 8th Michigan Infantry were transferred to Castle Pinckney. They were allowed to wander during the day and were confined to cells only at night.

The Castle quickly proved to be too small and inadequate, however, for permanent confinement; the prisoners were transferred back to the Charleston City Jail on October 31, 1861, after only six weeks. After the prisoners were removed, the fort was strengthened with earthen embankments and with additional mortars and Columbiads on the barbette tier. On December 12, the prisoners were transferred back to the island, following a fire which had burned a large section of Charleston and damaged the jail. They remained for just over a week with many sleeping on the inner parade ground before being transferred.

== Post Civil War and disuse ==
After the Civil War, the fort was modernized for possible use during the Spanish–American War, but again it was not needed. Some sources suggest that the fort never fired a single hostile shot during its existence. Parts of the old brick walls and casements were dismantled in 1890, to make way for a harbor lighthouse, which operated into the 20th century. There was local opposition to the plans for the lighthouse; a movement had been undertaken to construct a retirement home for servicemen on the island instead. Castle Pinckney was declared a U.S. National Monument in 1924 by Presidential proclamation. In 1951, Congress passed a bill to abolish Castle Pinckney National Monument and transferred it back to the U.S. Army Corps of Engineers. The island became excess property subject to sale by the Federal government in March 1956.

The island was acquired by the State Ports Commission, now called the South Carolina Ports Authority, as a spoil area in 1958 for $12,000, but the Commission investigated improving part of the land and using it as a historic destination. Plans for the use of the island as a spoil area proved impractical, and no successful plans for the use of the island as a tourist destination were created by the Commission. The Commission attempted to return the island to the Federal government, but the government declined, citing the cost of operations as outweighing the historical value of the island. The Commission received offers to buy the island for uses including a private residence, a nightclub, and a restaurant; but the agency refused all of them. A fire on December 22, 1967, destroyed an abandoned house on the island, but a warehouse was saved.

A local Sons of Confederate Veterans (S.C.V.) fraternal post took over management and care of the island in the late 1960s, attempting to preserve it and establish a museum. Castle Pinckney was listed on the National Register of Historic Places in 1970. Eventually, unable to raise the needed funds, the S.C.V. post allowed the fort to revert to state ownership. Castle Pinckney has undergone some limited restoration efforts. With its location on an isolated shoal in the middle of the harbor, access is difficult; maintenance is nearly impossible. It is gradually being reclaimed by nature.

== See also ==
- Castle Pinckney Light
- List of Civil War POW prisons and camps
