= Castle Pinckney Light =

Lighthouse in South Carolina, US

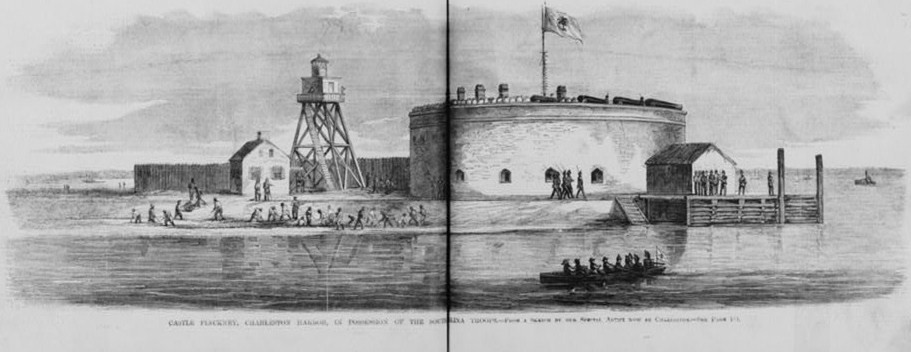
- Castle Pinckney from an 1861 illustration in Frank Leslie's Weekly
- Location: Shutes' Folly Island, Charleston County, South Carolina
- Coordinates: 32°46′25.1″N 79°54′39.6″W

Tower
- Constructed: 1855; 171 years ago

Light
- Deactivated: 1917; 109 years ago
- Focal height: 50 feet (15 m) (1855)
- Lens: 5th order Fresnel lens (1855)

Castle Pinckney Light is a former lighthouse on Shutes' Folly Island in Charleston Harbor, Charleston County, South Carolina.

Castle Pinckney was a c. 1810 U.S. coastal fortification, which was built upon the site of Fort Pinckney, a 1797 fort destroyed during an 1804 hurricane.

Castle Pinckney was occupied by Confederate forces during the Civil War.

== History ==
In 1855, a yellow tower with a focal plane of 50 feet (15 m) was built at Castle Pinckney. It had a 5th order Fresnel lens.

In 1878, Castle Pinckney was transferred to the Lighthouse Board for use as a lighthouse depot for the Sixth District. A new lighthouse was constructed in 1880. A third lighthouse was constructed in 1890, and it was made a lighthouse station.

In 1916, the lighthouse depot was moved to Tradd Street in Charleston. The lighthouse station was deactivated in 1917, and Castle Pinckney was transferred to the War Department for a time.

The lighthouse was probably destroyed in 1938.
