= Sullivan's Island Range Lights =

Lighthouses in South Carolina, US

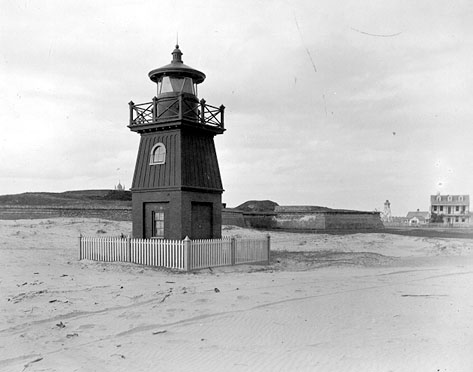
- Front range light in foreground and rear range light in background
- Location: Sullivan's Island, Charleston County, South Carolina
- Coordinates: 32.756°N 79.852°W

Tower
- Constructed: 1848
- Construction: Wooden - Front; Metal skeletal tower - Rear
- Height: 45 feet (14 m) - Front; 132 feet (40 m) - Rear
- Shape: Open-frame square pyramid (rear); frame structure (rear)

Light
- Deactivated: After 1901; No longer in existence
- Focal height: 120 feet (37 m) - Rear
- Lens: 6th order Fresnel lens
- Characteristic: Fixed red (rear); fixed white (front)

The Sullivan's Island Range Lights were range lights on the southern end of Sullivan's Island in Charleston County, South Carolina. The light station was first established in 1848 and was destroyed in 1861 during the Civil War. It was rebuilt after the war and the lights were in existence at least as late as 1901. Neither of the range lights still remains today.

Sullivan's Island is a barrier island at the northern entrance to the Charleston harbor. The entire island is now the Town of Sullivan's Island. It is the location of Fort Moultrie and the current Charleston Light.

== History ==
The station was established in 1848 to guide ships over the Charleston Bar and was destroyed during the war in 1861. After the surrender of Confederate forces in Charleston, a temporary beacon was placed in a skeletal tower on the roof of a private house. This light guided ships through the channel near the wreck of the ironclad USS Weehawken and also a lightship was placed over the wreck.

Range lights were then placed in Fort Moultrie in 1872, with the front beacon rested on the fort's parapet and the lightship was removed. The station also included keeper's quarters.

In 1878 the front beacon was moved from the parapet to the glacis of the fort. In 1879 it was raised 6 feet (1.8 m) and placed upon a brick room that served as an oil room. It was surrounded by a white picket fence.

In 1883, it was painted red. In 1886, the front beacon was moved 12 feet (3.7 m) to the west. In 1899, the rear range light was discontinued and replaced by two front range lights. On May 20, 1899 it was renamed as the "South Channel Range" lights.

In 1901, the Front Light was about 360 feet (110 m) southeast of the southeastern angle of Fort Moultrie, and the other light was about 190 feet (58 m) to the east of the Front light. The lights were eventually removed at an unknown date.
