= Fort Sumter Range Lights =

Lighthouses in South Carolina, US

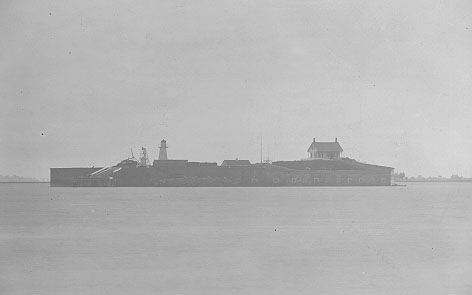
- The lighthouse on Fort Sumter
- Location: Charleston Harbor
- Coordinates: 32°45′8″N 79°52′29″W (Fort Sumter); 32°46′45″N 79°55′45″W (St. Philips)

Tower
- Constructed: 1855 (Fort Sumter); 1893 (St. Philip's)
- Automated: 1950 (Fort Sumter)
- Height: 51 feet (16 m) (Fort Sumter); 140 feet (43 m) (St. Philip's)
- Shape: Hexagonal tower (Fort Sumter); Skeletal tower (Fort Sumter after 1893); Pyramidal church steeple (St. Philip's)
- Fog signal: Bell (Fort Sumter)

Light
- Deactivated: 1915 (St. Philip's) early 1950s (Fort Sumter)
- Lens: 5th order Fresnel lens (Fort Sumter); White lantern (St. Philip's)

The Fort Sumter Range Lights are range lights to guide ships through the main channel of the Charleston Harbor, South Carolina. The original front light was built at Fort Sumter and the original rear light was in the steeple of St. Philip's Church in Charleston, South Carolina. Both lights were lit from 1893 to 1915 to make range lights. Today the Fort Sumter Range is the main approach channel to Charleston Harbor.

Fort Sumter, which was the site of the first battle of the Civil War, is now a National Monument. St. Philip's is a National Historic Landmark that was built in 1836.

== History ==
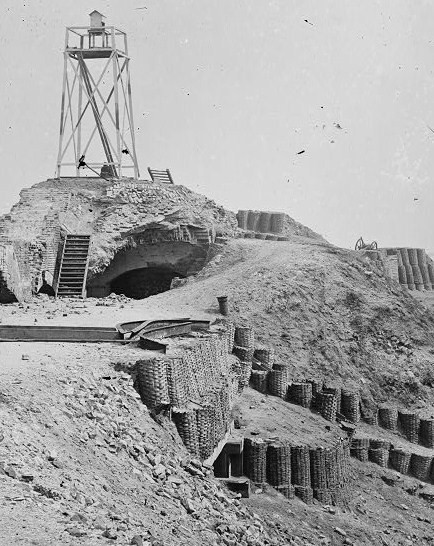
Temporary beacon set up after the Civil War

The front light at Fort Sumter completed in 1857. The front light was a white, fifth order Fresnel lens. The station was destroyed during the Civil War. A temporary light with a steamer lens was in place after the war ended and Fort Sumter was reoccupied by federal troops. Later the light was rebuilt. With little chance of war, this lighthouse was the major activity at Fort Sumter from 1876 to 1898.

In 1893, the front light was destroyed by a hurricane. The tower was replaced with a light green metal skeletal tower. The fog signal was a bell mechanically struck with a double blow every 15 s. After the rear light was extinguished in 1915, a radio beacon was added. The radio beacon was moved to Sullivan's Island lifesaving station in 1950. The light was deactivated in the early 1950s.

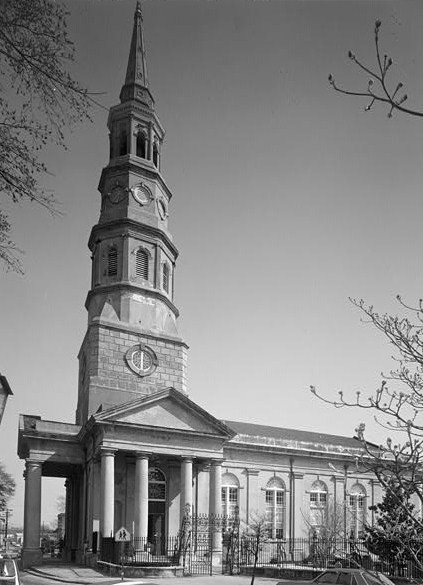
St. Philip's Episcopal Church

The rear range light was a white lantern in the steeple of St. Philip's Church in Charleston that was lit in 1893. The height of the lantern was 140 feet (43 m). The Annual Report of the Light-House Board reported that the electric apparatus for lighting the gas burner in the locomotive headlight was repaired in 1901. This light was removed in 1915.

== Today ==
The Fort Sumter Range is currently the main approach channel to the Charleston Harbor. Its front light is near Fort Sumter and its rear light is a lighted tower near the site of the old Fort Ripley Shoal Light.
