= Haig Point Range Lights =

Lighthouses in South Carolina, US

Haig Point Range rear light
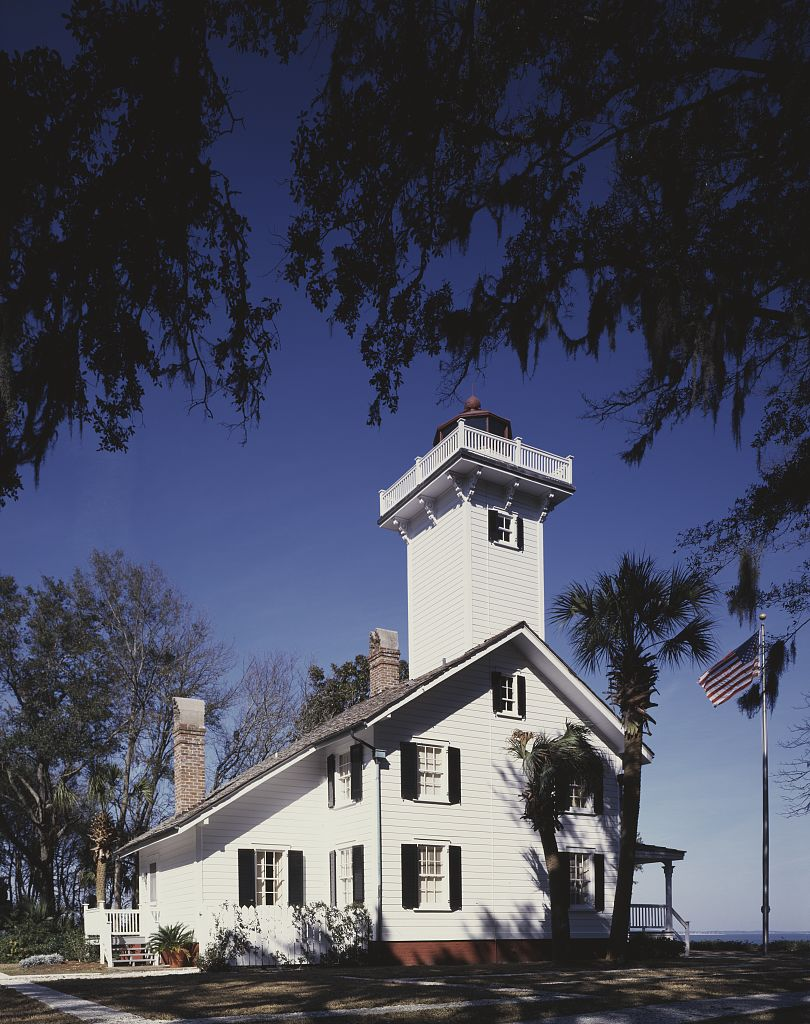
- Location: Daufuskie Island, Beaufort County, United States
- Coordinates: 32°08′42″N 80°50′10″W

Tower
- Constructed: 1873
- Construction: structural wood (house), tabby (foundation)
- Height: 61 ft (19 m)
- Shape: Square tower on roof of house
- Markings: White (house), red (roof), white (tower)
- Heritage: National Register of Historic Places contributing property

Light
- First lit: 1987
- Deactivated: 1924
- Focal height: 70 ft (21 m)
- Lens: fifth order Fresnel lens
- Characteristic: Fl W 14s
- Haig Point Rear Range Light
- U.S. Historic district – Contributing property
- Part of: Daufuskie Island Historic District (ID82003831)
- Added to NRHP: June 2, 1982
- Haig Point Range front light
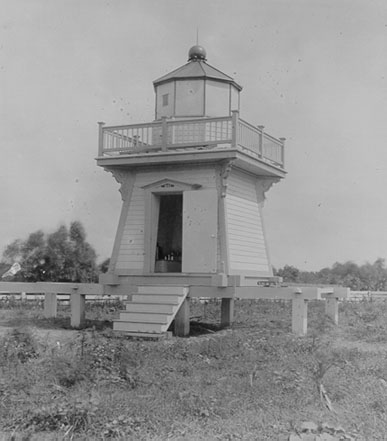
- Haig Point Front Range Light in 1885.
- Constructed: 1873
- Construction: structural wood
- Height: 18 ft (5.5 m)
- Deactivated: 1924
- Focal height: 17 ft (5.2 m)
- Lens: Steamer lens
- Characteristic: Fl W 14s

The Haig Point Range Lights were range lights on Calibogue Sound at the northeastern end of Daufuskie Island in Beaufort County, South Carolina. The Haig Point Range Lights were built in 1873 and were maintained as an official aid to navigation until about 1924. The Rear Range Light house has been restored. It is a guest house for the Haig Point Club and serves as a private aid to navigation.

Calibogue Sound is between Daufuskie and Hilton Head Islands. It connects the Intracoastal Waterway and the Harbour Town Marina with the Atlantic Ocean.

In 1871, the U.S. Congress authorized two sets of range lights on Daufuskie Island. The other range lights were the Bloody Point Range Lights on the south end of the island. Land was procured in 1872 at Haig's Point for the first set. The Haig Point range lights were lit in 1873. Although most sources indicate that the range lights were deactivated in 1924, others indicate that it was as early as 1922, to as late as 1934 or 1938.

== Rear Range Light ==
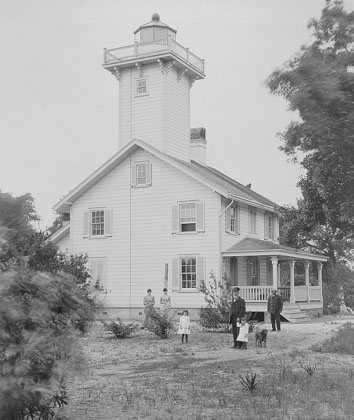
Haig Point Rear Range Light in 1885

The Rear Range light, built by James H. Reed, had a square tower on top of the light keeper's wooden, two-story Victorian house. The foundation for the house rests on the Tabby cement foundation of an old plantation house. The house and tower are painted white. The lantern has a red roof. The light was a 5th order Fresnel lens with a kerosene lamp. Later, an electric light was installed. In addition to the house, an oil house, and a 6,000 US gallon (22,700 L) cistern were built. This light was staffed until about 1924.

In 1925, the house was sold. Over time, it passed through several hands and fell into disrepair. In 1984, the house was purchased by the International Paper Realty Corporation. They began a restoration of the house as a guest house of the Haig Point Club. The oil house and cistern remain near the lighthouse.

In 1986, after about sixty years of darkness, a lamp was again activated in the Haig Point lighthouse. This light has an acrylic lens and is powered by solar cells and batteries. This flashing white light is a private aid to navigation.

The rear range is a contributing property of the National Register of Historic Places' Daufuskie Island Historic District. The nomination form and an additional picture is available from the South Carolina Department of Archives and History. In addition, the Beaufort County Historical Surveys for both the lighthouse and the oil house are available. These have recent photographs.

== Front Range Light ==
The front range light was a wooden structure with a lantern; the lighting apparatus was a steamer lens. The tower was located about 0.5 miles (0.80 km) south of the rear range light. This structure was movable to adjust to shifts in the channel. The fate of the front light after the station was closed is unknown, although some sources list it as having been destroyed.
