= Hilton Head Range Rear Light =

Lighthouse in South Carolina, US

Hilton Head Rear Range Light
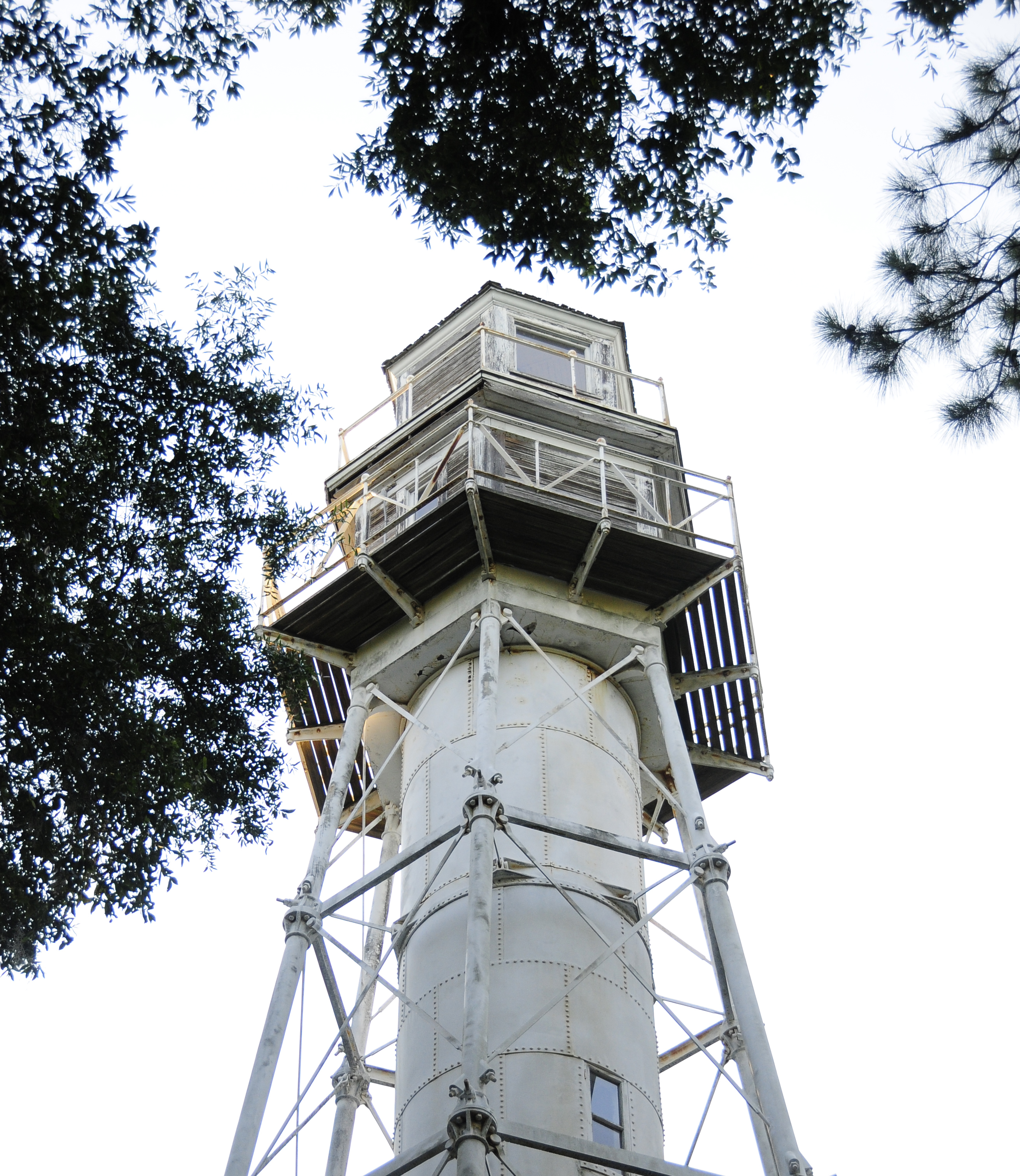
- Location: Hole 15, Arthur Hills Golf Course; Hilton Head Island, South Carolina
- Coordinates: 32°9′51″N 80°44′24″W

Tower
- Constructed: 1879
- Foundation: Concrete Footings
- Construction: Cast Iron
- Height: 87 ft (27 m)
- Shape: Skeleton tower Cylindrical stairs tower
- Markings: White
- Heritage: National Register of Historic Places listed place

Light
- First lit: 1880
- Deactivated: 1932
- Focal height: 92 ft (28 m)
- Lens: Oil lamps
- Rear Lighthouse of Hilton Head Range Light Station
- U.S. National Register of Historic Places
- Area: 1 acre (0.40 ha)
- NRHP reference No.: 85003349
- Added to NRHP: December 12, 1985

The Rear Lighthouse of Hilton Head Range Light Station, which is also called Leamington Lighthouse is an inactive light station on Hilton Head Island in Beaufort County, South Carolina. In 1983, it was named to the National Register of Historic Places.

== Overview ==
The light station was built by the U.S. Lighthouse Board in 1879 to 1880. It is a cast-iron, skeleton tower on six concrete piers. The hexagonal base is 30 ft (9.1 m) in diameter. There is a central, cylindrical stair tower with a spiral staircase. The hexagonal watch room and lantern has a wooden structure. The focal plane of the lantern is 87 ft (27 m) above its base and 92 ft (28 m) above mean sea level. The tower was covered with wooden sheathing, which was later covered with sheet metal. This sheathing has been removed.

The tower originally had Hains oil lamps, which were replaced in 1893 with Funck-Heap lamps. The station was deactivated in 1932. The front range light was moveable to compensate for the shifting channel. It is no longer in existence. The brick oil house standard near the tower. The South Carolina Department of Archives and History has information and pictures of the tower.

The keeper's house was cut in two and moved to Harbour Town in Hilton Head. The tower is located on hole 15 of the Arthur Hills Golf Course.
