= The Water Is Wide (book) =

1972 memoir by Pat Conroy

- First edition (Houghton Mifflin)
- Author: Pat Conroy
- Language: English
- Genre: Memoir
- Published: 1972
- Publisher: Random House
- Publication place: United States

The Water Is Wide is a 1972 memoir by Pat Conroy and is based on his work as a teacher on Daufuskie Island, South Carolina, which is called Yamacraw Island in the book. The book sometimes is identified as nonfiction and other times identified as a novel.

Yamacraw is a poor island lacking bridges and having little infrastructure. The book details Conroy's efforts to communicate with the islanders, who are nearly all directly descended from slaves and who have had little contact with the mainland or its people. He struggles to find ways to reach his students, ages 10 to 13, some of whom are illiterate or innumerate, and all of whom know little of the world beyond Yamacraw. Conroy (called Conrack by most of the students) does battle with the principal Mrs. Brown over his unconventional teaching methods and with the administrators of the school district, whom he accuses of ignoring the problems at the Yamacraw school.

A film adaptation, titled Conrack, was created in 1974, starring Jon Voight. A Hallmark Hall of Fame TV movie titled The Water Is Wide, starring Jeff Hephner and Alfre Woodard, was made in 2006.

== See also ==
- Gullah
