= Bald Rock =

Bald Rock may refer to:

== United States ==
- Bald Rock, California
- Bald Rock, Butte County, California
- Bald Rock Dome
- Bald Rock in Flathead County, Montana
- Bald Rock Heritage Preserve, South Carolina

== Elsewhere ==
- Bald Rock, Nova Scotia, Canada
- Bald Rock National Park, New South Wales, Australia
- Pukepohatu / Bald Rock, Northland, New Zealand
