= List of South Carolina heritage preserves =

This is a list of South Carolina heritage preserves managed by the South Carolina Department of Natural Resources.

- Aiken Gopher Tortoise Heritage Preserve/Wildlife Management Area
- Altamaha Towne Heritage Preserve
- Ashmore Heritage Preserve/WMA
- Bald Rock Heritage Preserve
- Bay Point Shoal Seabird Sanctuary
- Bear Branch Heritage Preserve
- Belvue Springs Heritage Preserve
- Bennett's Bay Heritage Preserve
- Bird Key - Stono Seabird Sanctuary
- Blackwell Heritage Preserve
- Botanty Bay Plantation Heritage Preserve/WMA
- Brasstown Creek Heritage Preserve/WMA
- Bunched Arrowhead Heritage Preserve
- Buzzard Island Heritage Preserve
- Buzzard Roost Heritage Preserve/WMA
- Capers Island Heritage Preserve
- Cartwheel Bay Heritage Preserve/WMA
- Cathedral Bay Heritage Preserve
- Chestnut Ridge Heritage Preserve/WMA
- Childsbury Towne Heritage Preserve
- Clear Creek Heritage Preserve
- Congaree Bluffs Heritage Preserve
- Congaree Creek Heritage Preserve
- Crab Bank Seabird Sanctuary
- Crosby Oxypolis Heritage Preserve
- Daws Island Heritage Preserve
- Deveaux Bank Seabird Sanctuary
- Ditch Pond Heritage Preserve/WMA
- Dungannon Plantation Heritage Preserve/WMA
- Eastatoe Creek Heritage Preserve/WMA
- Eva Russell Chandler Heritage Preserve/WMA
- Fort Frederick Heritage Preserve
- Fort Lamar Heritage Preserve
- Forty Acre Rock Heritage Preserve/WMA
- Glassy Mountain Heritage Preserve
- Gopher Branch Heritage Preserve
- Great Pee Dee River Heritage Preserve/WMA
- Green's Shell Enclosure Heritage Preserve
- Henderson Heritage Preserve/WMA
- Janet Harrison High Pond Heritage Preserve
- Joiner Bank Seabird Sanctuary
- Laurel Fork Heritage Preserve/WMA
- Lewis Ocean Bay Heritage Preserve
- Lighthouse Inlet Heritage Preserve
- Little Pee Dee Heritage Preserve/WMA
- Little Pee Dee State Park Bay Heritage Preserve
- Long Branch Bay Heritage Preserve
- Longleaf Pine Heritage Preserve/WMA
- Lynchburg Savanna Heritage Preserve/WMA
- Nipper Creek Heritage Preserve
- North Santee Bar Seabird Sanctuary
- Old Island Heritage Preserve/WMA
- Pacolet River Heritage Preserve
- Peachtree Rock Heritage Preserve
- Peters Creek Heritage Preserve
- Poinsett Bridge Heritage Preserve
- Rock Hill Blackjacks Heritage Preserve/WMA
- Savage Bay Heritage Preserve
- Savannah River Bluffs Heritage Preserve
- Segars-McKinnon Heritage Preserve
- Shealy's Pond Heritage Preserve
- South Bluff Heritage Preserve
- St. Helena Sound Heritage Preserve
- Stevens Creek Heritage Preserve/WMA
- Stoney Creek Battery Heritage Preserve
- Stumphouse Mountain Heritage Preserve/WMA
- Tillman Sand Ridge Heritage Preserve/WMA
- Tom Yawkey Wildlife Center Heritage Preserve
- Victoria Bluff Heritage Preserve/WMA
- Waccamaw River Heritage Preserve
- Wadakoe Mountain Heritage Preserve/WMA
- Wateree Heritage Preserve/WMA
- Watson-Cooper Heritage Preserve/WMA
- Woods Bay Heritage Preserve
