= Harbour Town Light =

Lighthouse in South Carolina, United States

Harbour Town Lighthouse
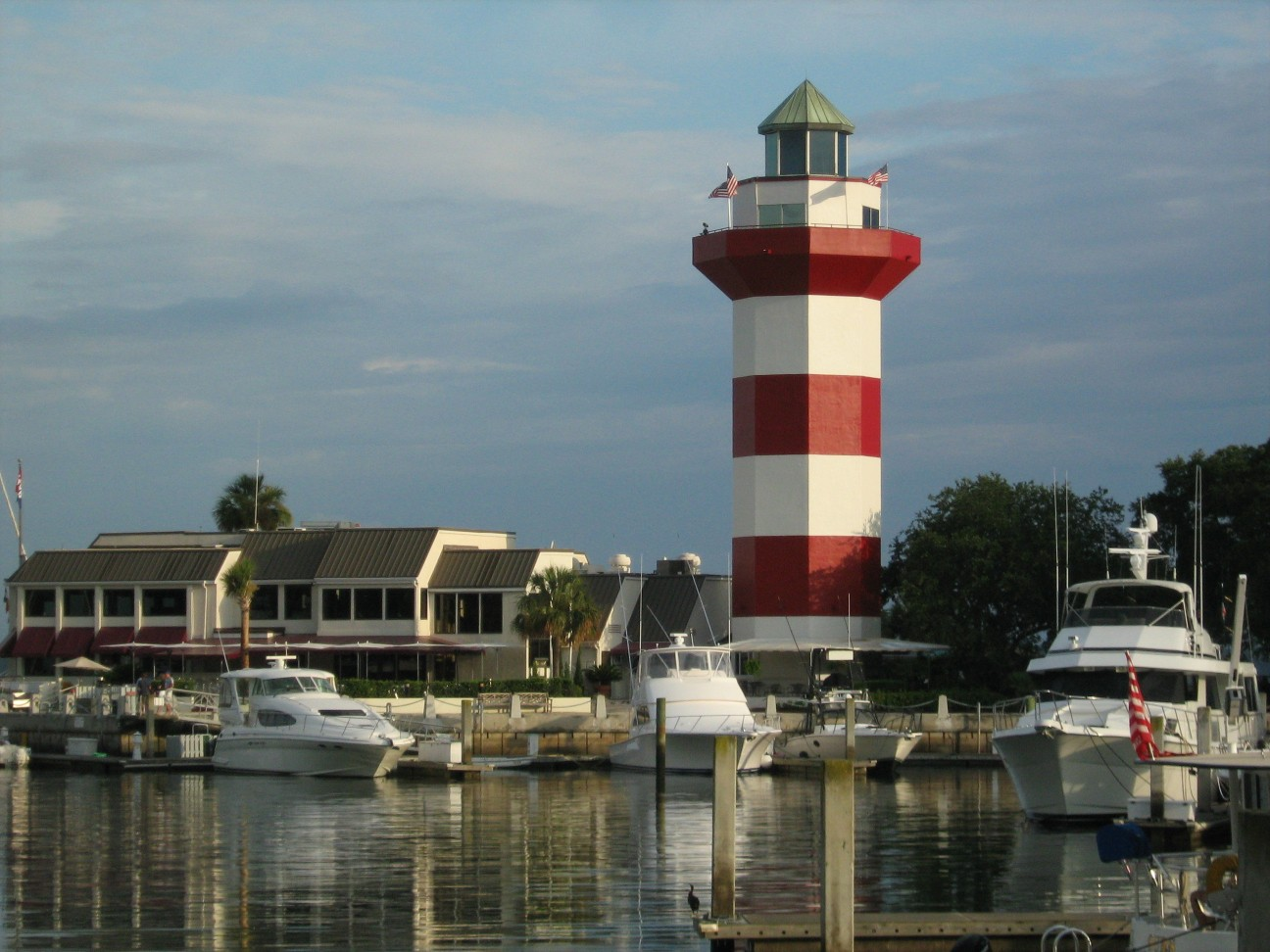
- Harbour Town Lighthouse
- Location: Hilton Head Island, South Carolina
- Coordinates: 32°08′19″N 80°48′46″W

Tower
- Constructed: 1969
- Foundation: Concrete
- Construction: Stucco over metal lath and plywood
- Height: 93 feet (28 m)
- Shape: Octagonal tower
- Markings: Red and white bands

Light
- First lit: 1970
- Focal height: 28 m (92 ft)
- Lens: White
- Characteristic: Fl W 2.5s

The Harbour Town Lighthouse is a lighthouse at the Harbour Town Marina at Hilton Head Island, South Carolina built between 1969 and 1970. It was privately built and is a private aid to navigation. Although initially ridiculed by local residents during the planning and construction phases, the lighthouse became instantly popular and is today the most recognizable symbol of Hilton Head Island and Sea Pines Resort. The annually televised Heritage golf tournament has helped increase the lighthouse's fame to millions of golf fans worldwide, and the 18th hole at the Harbour Town Golf Links has become one of the most popular and recognizable finishing holes in golf.

== History ==
Building of Harbour Town Lighthouse was started in 1969 by Charles Fraser and completed in 1970. It is an octagonal column with a red observation deck or gallery below the lantern. The column is stucco on metal lath over plywood with a height of 93 feet (28 m). Its daymark is alternating red and white bands. It has a white light that flashes every 25 s.

The lighthouse was privately built as part of Harbour Town Marina and Sea Pines Plantation. It is open for the public to climb. There is a small fee for a day pass to the Plantation and another small fee for admission to its lighthouse.

== Current ==
The Harbour Town Lighthouse is now a tourist and wedding destination for Hilton Head Island. The privately owned lighthouse also features a museum with historic photos of Harbour Town, and gift shops at the bottom and top of the light.
