= Hannah Wicklund =

American musician and singer-songwriter

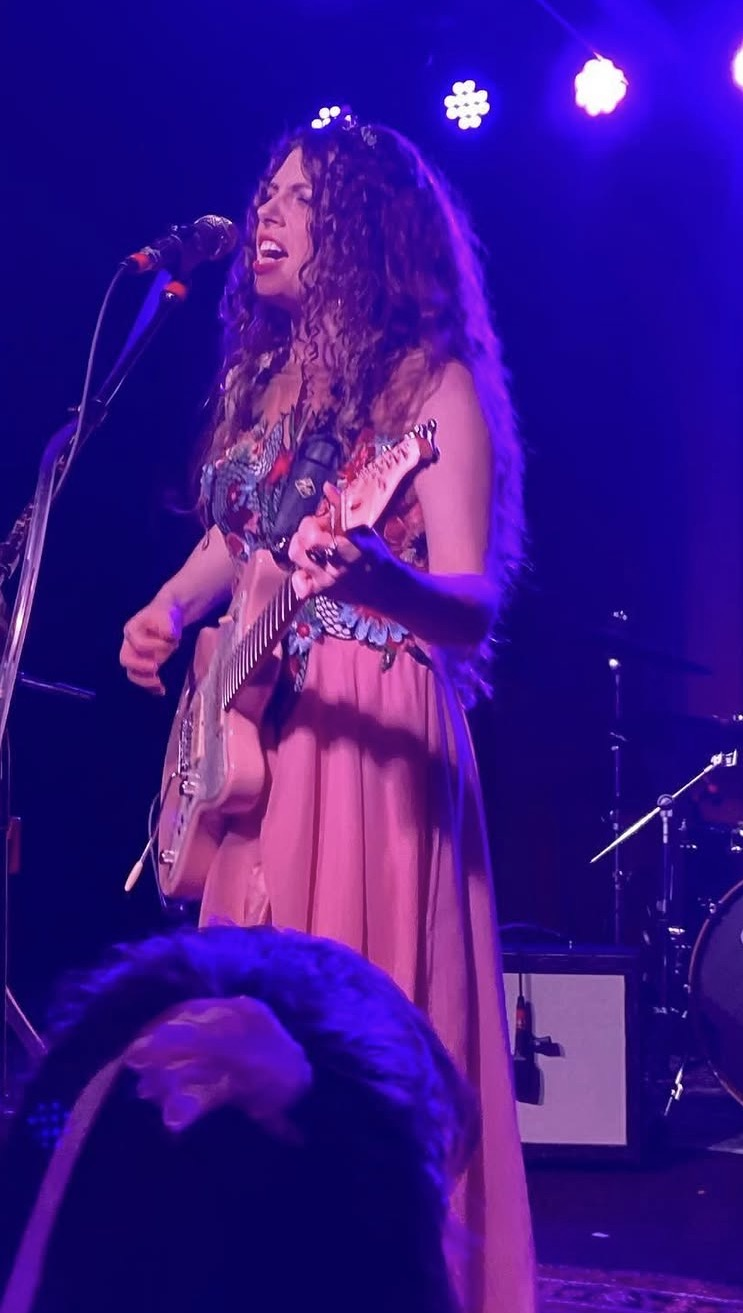
- Wicklund performing in 2024

Background information
- Born: Hannah Jean Wicklund; April 2, 1997 (age 29); Hilton Head Island, South Carolina, United States
- Genre: Blues rock
- Occupation: Singer-songwriter
- Instruments: Guitar; piano; vocals
- Years active: 2006–present
- Label: Strawberry Moon Records
- Formerly of: The Steppin Stones
- Website: Official website

Hannah Jean Wicklund is an American blues rock musician and singer-songwriter from Hilton Head Island, South Carolina. To date, she has released four studio albums through her own record label, Strawberry Moon Records. She released her debut album Hannah Wicklund & The Steppin Stones in 2018 and this was followed by her long-delayed sophomore album, The Prize, released in 2024. Both albums received critical praise from a variety of publications. Two further albums followed in 2026.

== Early life ==
Wicklund was born on Hilton Head Island, South Carolina. Her mother was an artist and her father painted houses and also played as a drummer in a local band. Her older brother, Luke Mitchell, is also a musician and fronts a band called The High Divers. Wicklund started playing piano aged three and guitar aged eight and formed her band, The Steppin Stones, aged nine. Wicklund moved to Nashville in 2016 to further her music career.

== Career ==
Hannah Wicklund & The Steppin Stones released "Bomb Through The Breeze" in 2017, which was followed by the release of their debut album Hannah Wicklund & The Steppin’ Stones in 2018 on Wicklund's own record label, Strawberry Moon Records. The album was produced by Sadler Vaden and received generally positive reviews. The song "Looking Glass" was likened to the music of Tom Petty and "Ghost" was likened to The Black Keys. Gio Pilato from Bluebird Reviews praised Wicklund's vocals, saying "Wicklund delivers the full package about her ability as a singer and as a songwriter", and was positive about the band as a whole, "their power, intensity, passion and all their insane talent, right now, in the current music scene, is second to none".

Her second album, The Prize, was released in 2024. It was completed in early 2020 and due to be released in March 2022 but, due to what was described as 'music business bureaucracy', it was delayed until 2024. It was produced by Sam Kiszka and featured drumming from Danny Wagner, both of Greta Van Fleet. In a mixed review for Kerrang!, Steve Beebee praised "Can't Get Enough" as 'gorgeously melodic' and said the final song, "Sun to Sun", 'keeps the listener on their toes' but was more critical of some of the songs in the middle of the album. Ryan Dillon praised Wicklund's vocals on her second album and was complimentary on the diversity of genres throughout. Casey Ryan Vock, writing for Seven Days, commented that the album has influences from Motown, classic rock and R&B singers and stated that the album 'marks a significant step forward' for her. Callum Crumlish likened her 'unwavering feminine aggression' positively to Stevie Nicks and Alanis Morissette. Wicklund plays both guitar and piano on the album. In a review in Powerplay, she was praised "[not] only is Hannah a truly stunning guitarist, but her piano work and vocals are quite simply breathtaking".

In March 2024, Wicklund played a concert at The Troubadour and this was recorded and released as Live at the Troubadour the following year. It received critical praise. Seay Howell praised the feminist themes in her music and lyrics and described her voice as 'powerhouse'. Most of the songs on her live album are from her first two studio albums.

Her fourth studio album, War On Women; Calling All Good Men, was released on August 28, 2026. The self-produced and self-written album was entirely funded from sales of her own paintings and artwork. Wicklund also launched The Strawberry Moon Tribune, an arts and culture magazine scheduled for release on the occurrence of each new moon. Thomas H. Green, writing for The Arts Desk, gave the album a mixed review, but did liken her music positively to Heart and Blues Pills. According to Joyzine, the album was written after Wicklund broke up with her long-time partner and also a 'full-blown collusion and conspiracy' involving her attorney, manager and record label, culminating in a death threat from her own manager. The album covers many genres such as gospel, soul, pop, rock and blues.

== Discography ==
=== Studio albums ===
- Hannah Wicklund & The Steppin Stones (2018)
- The Prize (2024)
- The Living Vault (2026)
- War On Women; Calling All Good Men (2026)

=== Live albums ===
- Live at the Troubadour (2025)

=== EPs ===
- The Inbetween (2020)
