= Shelter Cove Towne Centre =

- Location: Hilton Head Island, South Carolina, South Carolina, United States
- Coordinates: 32.184707°N 80.721344°W
- Address: 40 Shelter Cove Lane
- Opened: April 1988 (The Mall at Shelter Cove); May 2017 (Shelter Cove Towne Centre)
- Closed: January 13, 2013 (The Mall at Shelter Cove)
- Developer: Southeastern Development Associates
- Manager: Roni Allbritton
- Num. of stores: 25
- Num. of anchor tenants: 2
- Floor area: 290,000 square feet (27,000 m^{2})
- Floors: 1
- Website: Shelter Cove Towne Centre

Shelter Cove Towne Centre, formerly The Mall at Shelter Cove, is a mixed-use lifestyle center located in Hilton Head Island, South Carolina. The center features two anchor stores, which include Belk and Kroger, a park, and two luxury apartment buildings.

== History ==
=== The Mall at Shelter Cove ===
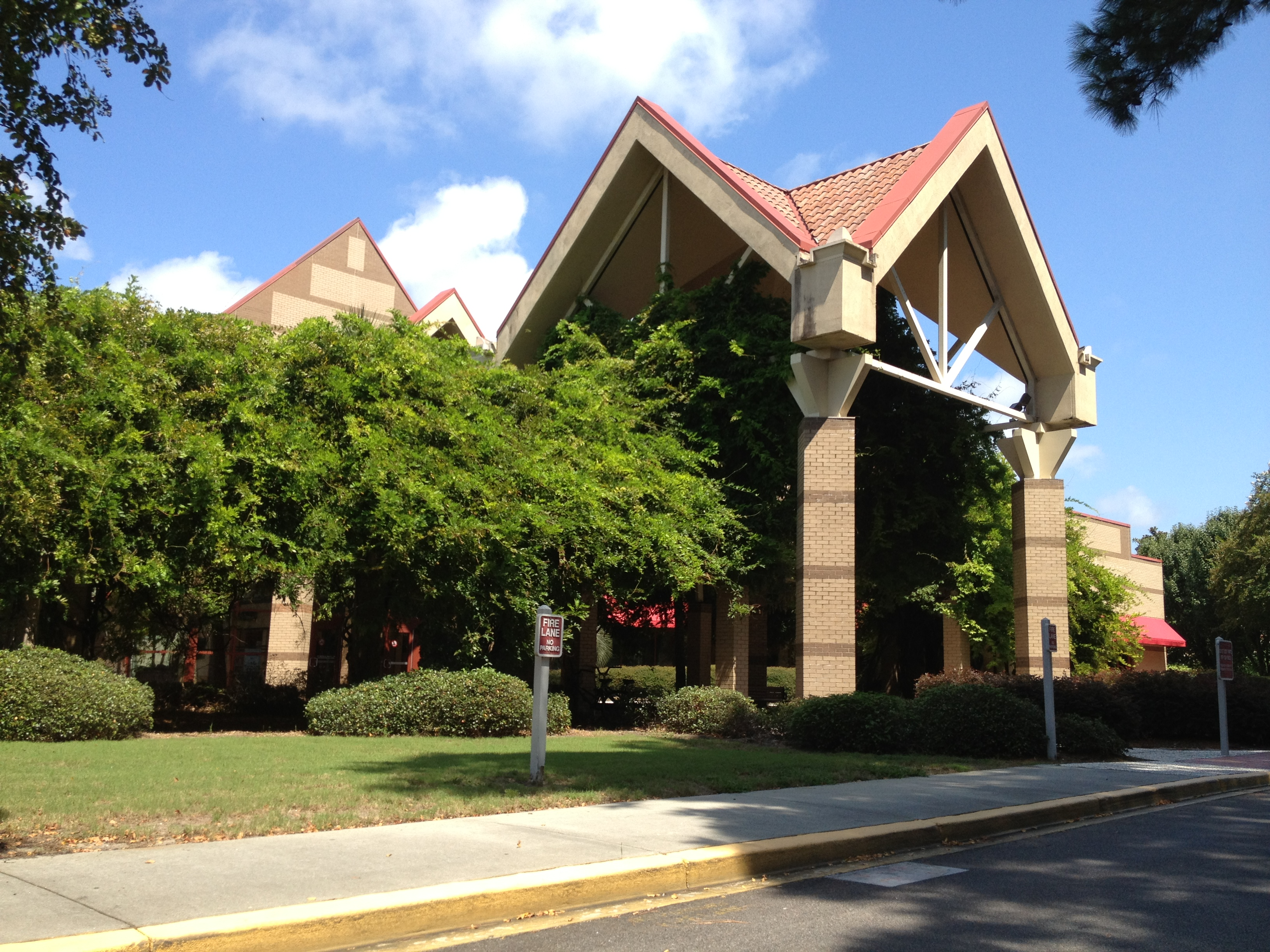
The Mall at Shelter Cove, September 2012

The original mall opened in April 1988 under the development of Jim Wilson & Associates, with Jordan Marsh and Belk as its anchor stores. Over 60 inline tenants included Banana Republic, Victoria's Secret, Express, The Limited and four restaurants.

In 1991, Jordan Marsh closed and JCPenney replaced it. JCPenney, in turn, closed in 1996, and a Saks Fifth Avenue store opened in the space on March 21, 1997. Saks converted the store to a Saks Off Fifth outlet in 2004, and that store too would later move out of Shelter Cove.

Although Belk expanded its store in 2007, Mall at Shelter Cove lost many major tenants throughout the 2000s. Stores like Crabtree & Evelyn, Brooks Brothers, PacSun, Waldenbooks, Ann Taylor, and Williams Sonoma were all lost by the end of the decade. In 2008, representatives of then-owner Petrie Ross announced plans to add a movie theater, but this was canceled because the company could not secure money to build one.

Off Fifth relocated to the Tanger Factory Outlet Centers in nearby Bluffton in February 2011. Shortly afterward, supermarket chain Kroger bought the mall. In early 2012 it was reported that the mall would be demolished (excluding the Belk stores) and turned into a community park development with a Kroger grocery store.

=== New development ===
The Mall at Shelter Cove closed January 2013, with demolition beginning on the 13th. Construction began soon afterward, redeveloping the mall into an outdoor lifestyle center. The new center features 290,000 square feet (27,000 m^{2}) of retail space along with a five-acre park.

In December 2013, Kroger opened their location in the center, adding the second anchor store. Soon after, additional tenants such as JoS. A. Bank, Orange Leaf, and AT&T added locations in the center.

In March 2015, construction began on WaterWalk at Shelter Cove, two apartment buildings along Broad Creek. The two apartment buildings were originally scheduled to be completed in 2016 and include over 200 apartments and a five-story parking garage.

In February 2017, it was announced that site work for the first of two luxury apartment buildings was nearing completion. The first houses 136 apartments and the second holds 104 units. In May 2017, the first of the two buildings opened. The second is scheduled to open by the end of 2018 into early 2019 as construction nears completion.
