= Fish Haul Archaeological Site =

Archaeological site in South Carolina, United States

- Fish Haul Archaeological Site (38BU805)
- U.S. National Register of Historic Places
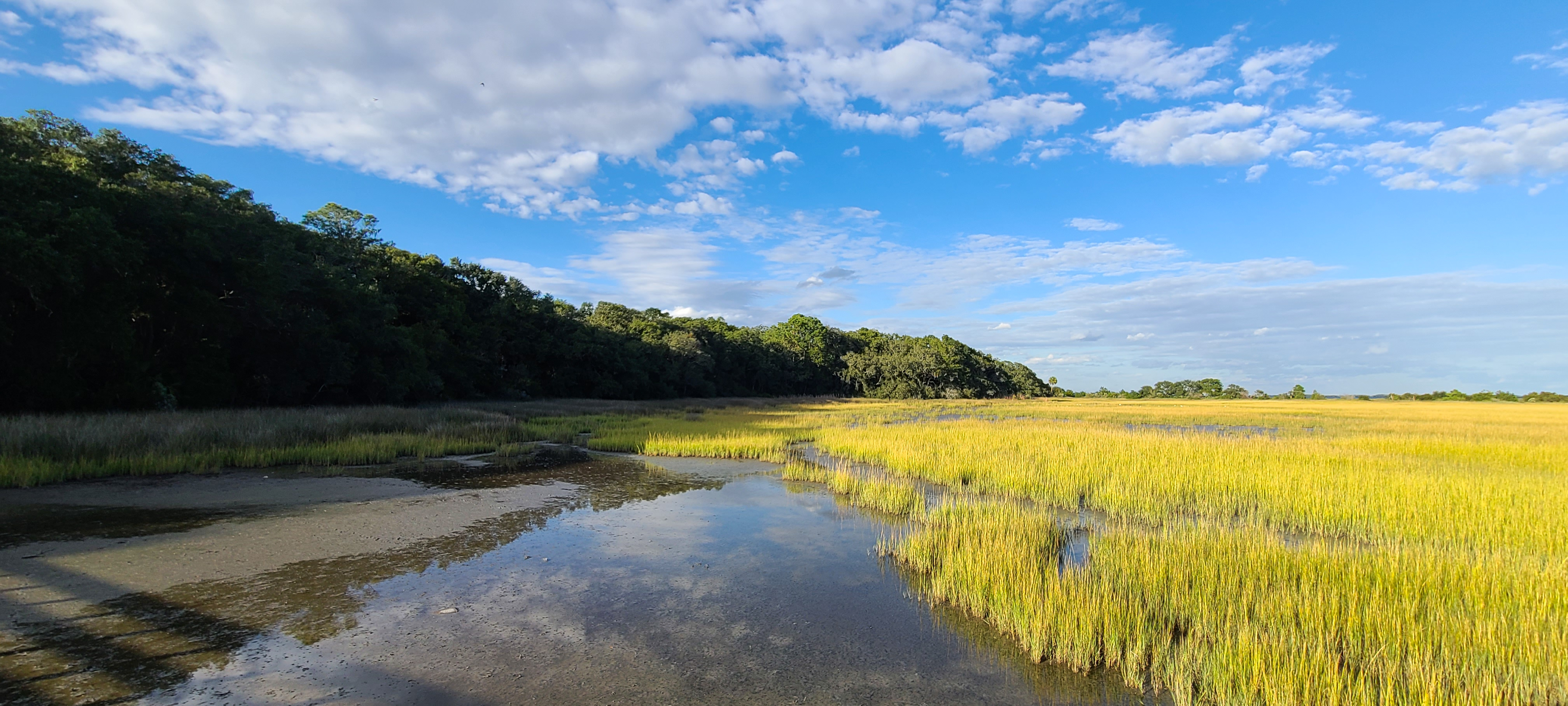
- Salt Marsh at Fish Haul Archaeological Site
- Nearest city: Hilton Head Island, South Carolina
- Area: 33 acres (13 ha)
- NRHP reference No.: 88000976
- Added to NRHP: June 30, 1988

The Fish Haul Archaeological Site, an "address restricted" site located in Beaufort County, South Carolina, is significant because of its archaeological remains from two different eras. The pre-historic findings, which date from 1800 to 1300 BC, offer evidence that small groups of people lived in the area. The historic component represents a freemen's village, Mitchelville, which was occupied during the transition between slavery and freedom by Sea Island blacks. The Fish Haul site represents the only known freedmen village established by occupying Union troops. The site was listed in the National Register of Historic Places on June 30, 1988.
