= Sea Pines (archaeological site) =

Archaeological site in South Carolina, United States

- U.S. National Register of Historic Places
- Nearest city: Hilton Head Island, South Carolina
- Area: 1 acre (0.40 ha)
- MPS: Historic Resources of the Late Archaic-Early Woodland Period Shell Rings of South Carolina, ca. 1,000-2,200 years B.C.
- NRHP reference No.: 70000563
- Added to NRHP: October 15, 1970

Sea Pines is a historic archaeological site located at Sea Pines Resort, Hilton Head Island, Beaufort County, South Carolina. It was listed in the National Register of Historic Places in 1970.

The site is one of 20 or more prehistoric Indian shell middens in a ring shape located from the central coast of South Carolina to the central coast of Georgia. It is believed to date early in the second millennium BC, and to contain some of the earliest pottery known in North America. The Sea Pines ring stands about two feet (60 cm) above a flat central area, which is about five feet (1.5 m) above mean sea level.
