= Stoney-Baynard Plantation =

Archaeological site in South Carolina, United States

- U.S. National Register of Historic Places
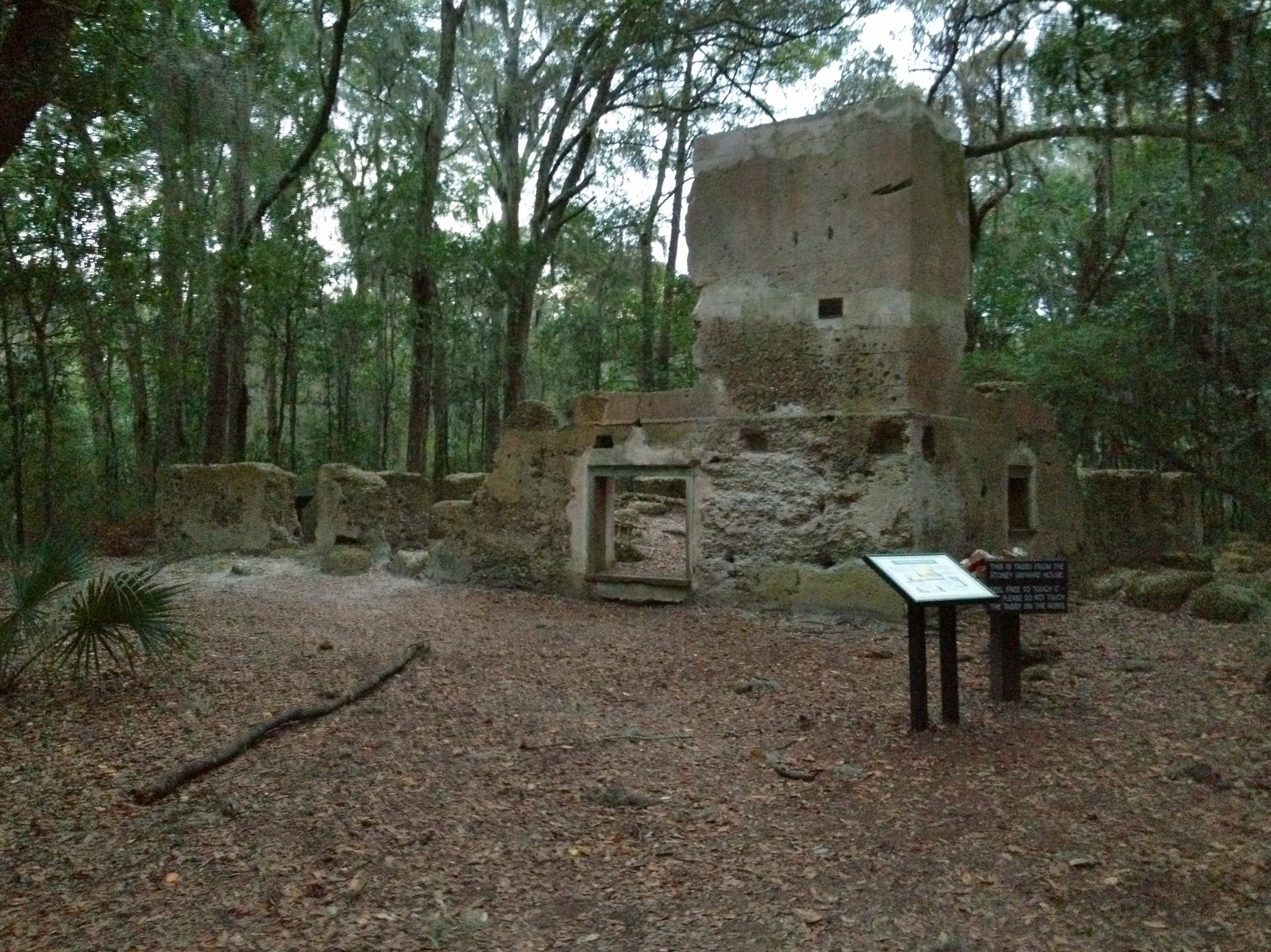

- Location within South Carolina Location within the United States
- Location: Hilton Head Island, South Carolina
- Coordinates: 32°7′44″N 80°48′53″W
- Area: 6 acres (2.4 ha)
- Architectural style: Georgian
- NRHP reference No.: 94000038
- Added to NRHP: February 23, 1994

Stoney-Baynard Plantation on Hilton Head Island, SC was listed on the National Register of Historic Places in 1994. The listing included one contributing site on 6 acres (2.4 ha).

It has also been known as Baynard Ruins and as Braddock's Point Plantation. The historic site and ruins are located in between Baynard Park Road and Plantation Drive within present day Sea Pines Plantation, a private gated community on the south end of Hilton Head Island, South Carolina. The site consists of below ground archaeological remains covering an area just under six acres and a series of four ruins. A main house, an overseer's house, and a slave house are associated with the Stoney-Baynard Plantation, dating from the first decade of the nineteenth century. A fourth structure was associated with the site's occupation by Union pickets after the Battle of Port Royal during the American Civil War.

The archaeological remains are well preserved, with archaeological testing documenting intact sub-surface features and clear horizontal patterning of artifacts. Standing architectural ruins include 2-story portions of the main house, a chimney footing for the overseer's house, and footings for a tent for the Union Troops. The structures were built in the Georgian Architectural style with tabby foundations and exterior walls.

Today the site is incorporated into green spaced land owned by the Sea Pines Community Services Administration Association and is consequently preserved.

== History ==
In 1793, Captain Jack Stoney, a Revolutionary War hero, built the Baynard Plantation as part of Braddock's Point Plantation. Since the Stoney family were the first residents, the home is often referred to as the Stoney-Baynard ruins. It was 1,885 square feet, built of timber and a mixture of oyster shells, lime, and sand, and overlooked the Calibogue Sound.

It is unsure exactly how the plantation home was acquired by the Baynard family in 1837, but there are two most likely ways. It is believed that a Stoney heir bet the home during a late-night poker game and lost, or the Stoneys declared bankruptcy and William Baynard acquired the estate from the bank. William Baynard was a very successful cotton planter who occupied the home from 1840 to 1849. After William Baynard's death, the plantation was raided by Union forces and housed many soldiers during the Civil War. Shortly after the war ended, the home was burned to the ground.
