= William Hilton Jr. =

English explorer (1617–1675)

- Born: 1617 (baptised 22 June 1617); Northwich, Cheshire, England
- Died: 7 September 1675 (aged 57–58); Charlestown, Boston, Massachusetts US
- Known for: Explorer

William Hilton Jr. (1617 – 7 September 1675) was an English explorer who explored the coast of The Carolinas in what is today the United States.

== Biography ==
Hilton was born in 1617, and baptised on June 22, 1617, at Northwich, Cheshire, England. His father came to the New England colonies in 1621, with William Jr and his mother following two years later on the ship Anne. In 1623, the elder Hilton founded the settlement of Dover, New Hampshire with his brother Edward. It is the oldest settlement in the state of New Hampshire as William Jr. was present at the founding as an infant. He traded with the Indians in his father's employment. He became a freeman in 1653 at Newbury, Massachusetts, then from 1654 onwards he resided in Charlestown, Massachusetts.

His expeditions took him all over the east coast of America and to the Caribbean. In August 1662, Hilton sailed from Massachusetts Bay Colony on the ship Adventurer, returning in October of that year with enough information to map the Cape Fear coast. In the British Museum there is a map entitled Discouery made by William Hilton of Charles town In New England Marriner from Cape Hatterask Lat: 35 : 30'. to ye west of Cape Roman in Lat: 32.30' In the year 1662 And layd Down in the forme as you see by Nicholas Shapley of the town aforesaid November 1662.

In 1663, he was commander of the ship Adventure, and his Relation of a Discovery lately made on the Coast of Florida was published in London the following year. On August 10, 1663, he sailed from Barbados and the expedition was "set forth by several Gentlemen and Merchants of the Island of Barbadoes." On this voyage he explored the Carolina coast and gave names to many of the features, including Hilton Head. In 1671 he commanded the Amity and transported several enslaved people from Barbados to Boston.

Hilton died on 7 September 1675, aged 57 or 58, in Charlestown, Boston.
