= Hilton Head Island, South Carolina =

Town in South Carolina, United States

Hilton Head Island
- Town
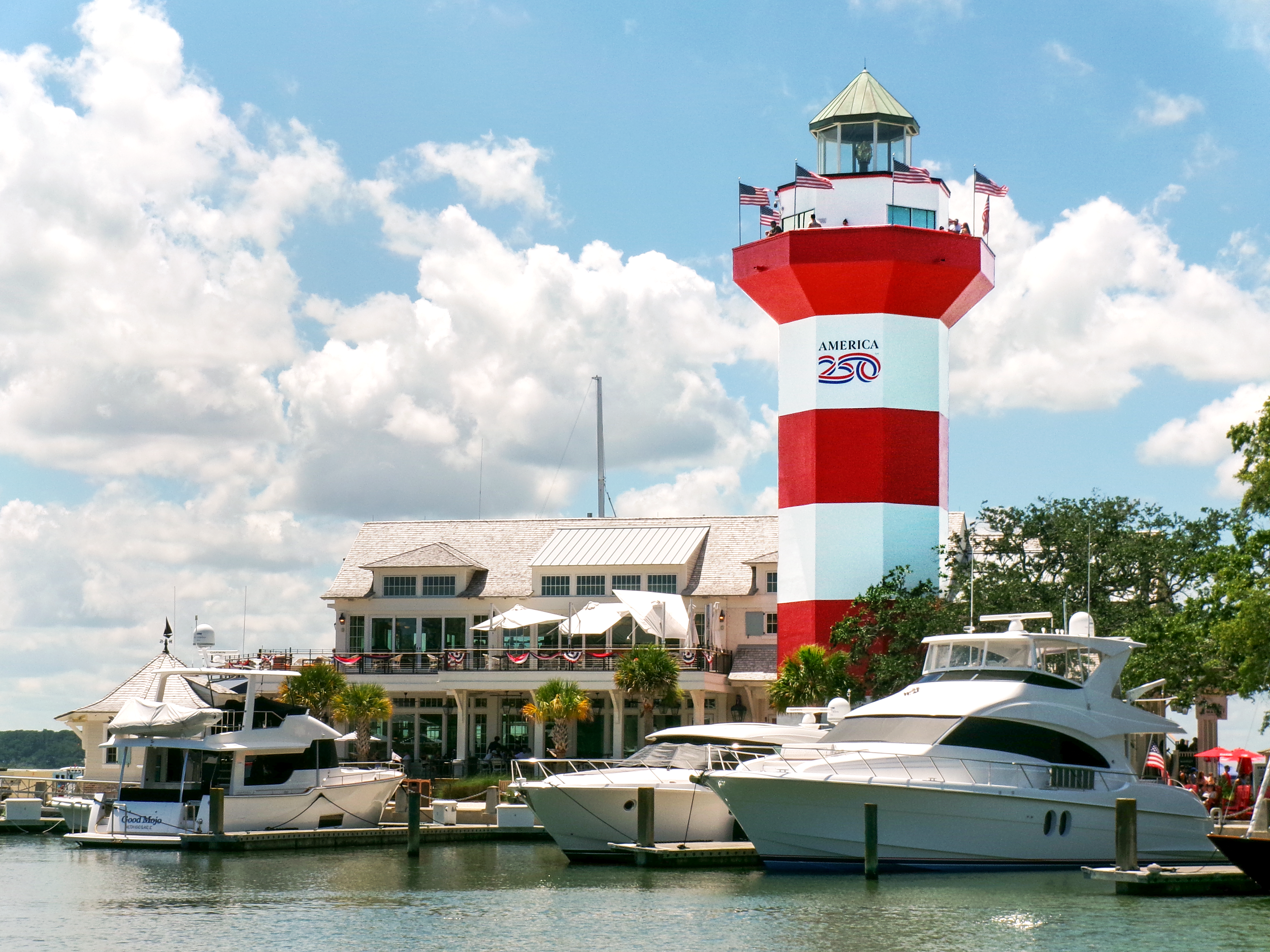
- Harbour Town Marina in Sea Pines Resort with the Harbour Town Lighthouse

- Seal
- Nicknames: Hilton Head, HHI
- Interactive map of Hilton Head Island
- Location within South Carolina Location within the United States
- Coordinates: 32°10′44″N 80°45′25″W
- Country: United States
- State: South Carolina
- County: Beaufort
- Incorporated (town): 1983; 43 years ago
- Named for: Navigational marker left by William Hilton

Government
  - Mayor: Alan Perry

Area
  - Town: 69.13 sq mi (179.05 km^{2})
  - Land: 41.35 sq mi (107.10 km^{2})
  - Water: 27.78 sq mi (71.95 km^{2}) 40.19%
- Elevation: 0 ft (0 m)

Population (2020)
  - Town: 37,661
  - Density: 910.7/sq mi (351.63/km^{2})
  - Urban: 71,824 (US: 395th)
  - Urban density: 1,136/sq mi (438.5/km^{2})
  - Metro: 232,523 (US: 202nd)

GDP
  - Metro: $12.497 billion (2022)
- Time zone: UTC−5 (EST)
  - Summer (DST): UTC−4 (EDT)
- ZIP code: 29925, 29926, 29928
- Area code: 843
- FIPS code: 45-34045
- GNIS feature ID: 2405841
- Website: hiltonheadislandsc.gov

Hilton Head Island (sometimes referred to as simply Hilton Head) is a resort town in Beaufort County, South Carolina, United States. It is a barrier island within the South Carolina Lowcountry, located 20 miles (32 km) northeast of Savannah, Georgia, and 95 miles (153 km) southwest of Charleston. The year-round population was 37,661 at the 2020 census, although during the peak of summer vacation season the population can swell to 150,000. It is the principal city of the Hilton Head Island metropolitan area, which had an estimated population of 232,523 in 2023.

The island is named after Captain William Hilton, who in 1663 identified a headland near the entrance to Port Royal Sound, which mapmakers named "Hilton's Headland." The island has a rich history that started with seasonal occupation by Native Americans thousands of years ago and continued with European exploration and the sea island cotton trade. It became an important base of operations for the Union blockade of the Southern ports during the Civil War. Once the island fell to Union troops, hundreds of ex-slaves flocked to Hilton Head, which is still home to many of their descendants, who are known as the Gullah (or Geechee). They have managed to hold on to much of their ethnic and cultural identity.

The island features 12 miles (19 km) of beachfront on the Atlantic Ocean and is a popular vacation destination for 2.5 million visitors each year. Hilton Head Island offers an unusual number of cultural opportunities for a community its size, including plays at the Arts Center of Coastal Carolina, the 120-member full chorus of the Hilton Head Choral Society, the Hilton Head Symphony Orchestra, an annual outdoor, tented wine tasting event on the east coast, and several other annual community festivals. It also hosts the RBC Heritage, a PGA Tour tournament played on the Harbour Town Golf Links in Sea Pines Resort.

Hilton Head Island was incorporated as a municipality in 1983 and is well known for its eco-friendly development. The town's Natural Resources Division enforces the Land Management Ordinance which minimizes the impact of development and governs the style of buildings and how they are situated amongst existing trees. As a result, Hilton Head Island enjoys an unusual amount of tree cover relative to the amount of development.

Approximately 70% of the island, including most of the tourist areas, is located inside gated communities. However, the town maintains several public beach access points, including one for the exclusive use of town residents, who have approved several multimillion-dollar land-buying bond referendums to control commercial growth.

== History ==
=== New World discovery ===
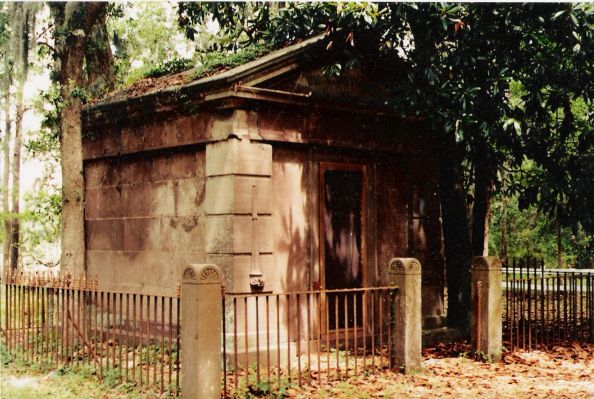
The Baynard Mausoleum, built in 1846, is the oldest intact structure on the island.

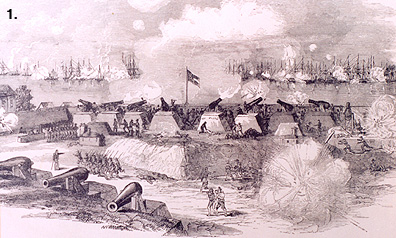
Fort Walker, Battle of Port Royal, November 7, 1861

The Sea Pines shell ring can be seen near the east entrance to the Sea Pines Forest Preserve. The ring, one of at least 50 known to exist, is 150 feet (46 m) in diameter and is believed to be over 4,000 years old. Archeologists believe that the ring was a refuse heap created by Indigenous people who lived in the interior of the ring. It was kept clear and used as a common area. Two other shell rings on Hilton Head were destroyed when the shells were removed and used to make tabby for roads and buildings. The Green's Shell Enclosure, Sea Pines, and Skull Creek shell rings are listed in the National Register of Historic Places and are protected by law.

Since the beginning of recorded history in the New World, the waters around Hilton Head Island have been known, occupied and fought for in turn by the English, Spanish, French, and Scots.

A Spanish expedition led by Francisco Cordillo explored the area in 1521, initiating European contact with local tribes. In 1663, Captain William Hilton sailed on the Adventure from Barbados to explore lands granted by King Charles II of England to the eight Lords Proprietor. In his travels, he identified a headland near the entrance to Port Royal Sound. He named it "Hilton's Head" after himself. He stayed for several days, making note of the trees, crops, "sweet water", and "clear sweet air".

=== 17th to 19th centuries ===
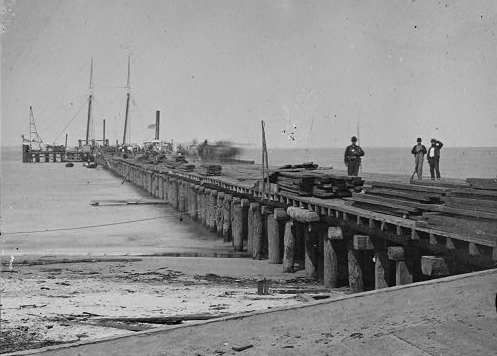
Dock built by Union troops on Hilton Head Island, April 1862

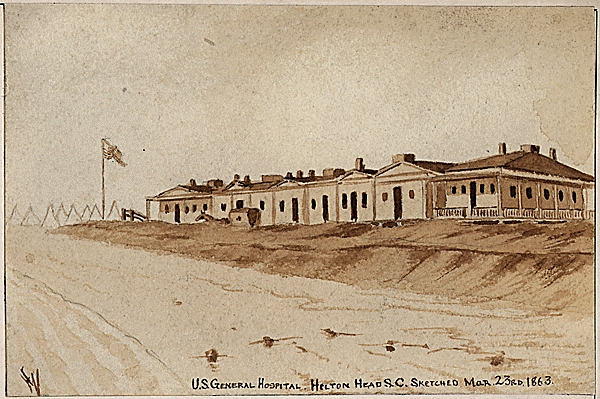
U.S. General Hospital, March 23, 1863

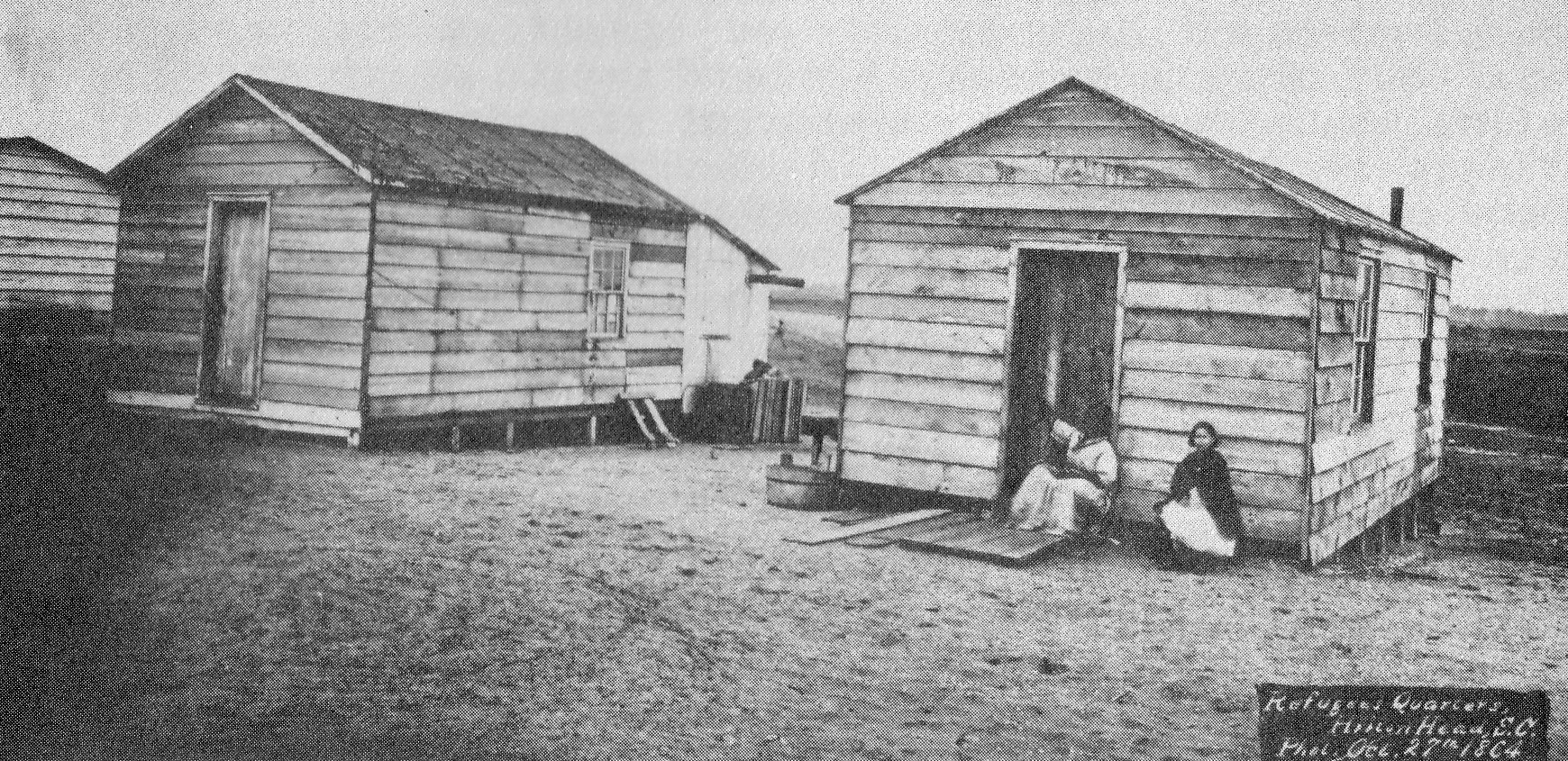
Mitchelville "refugee quarters," 1864

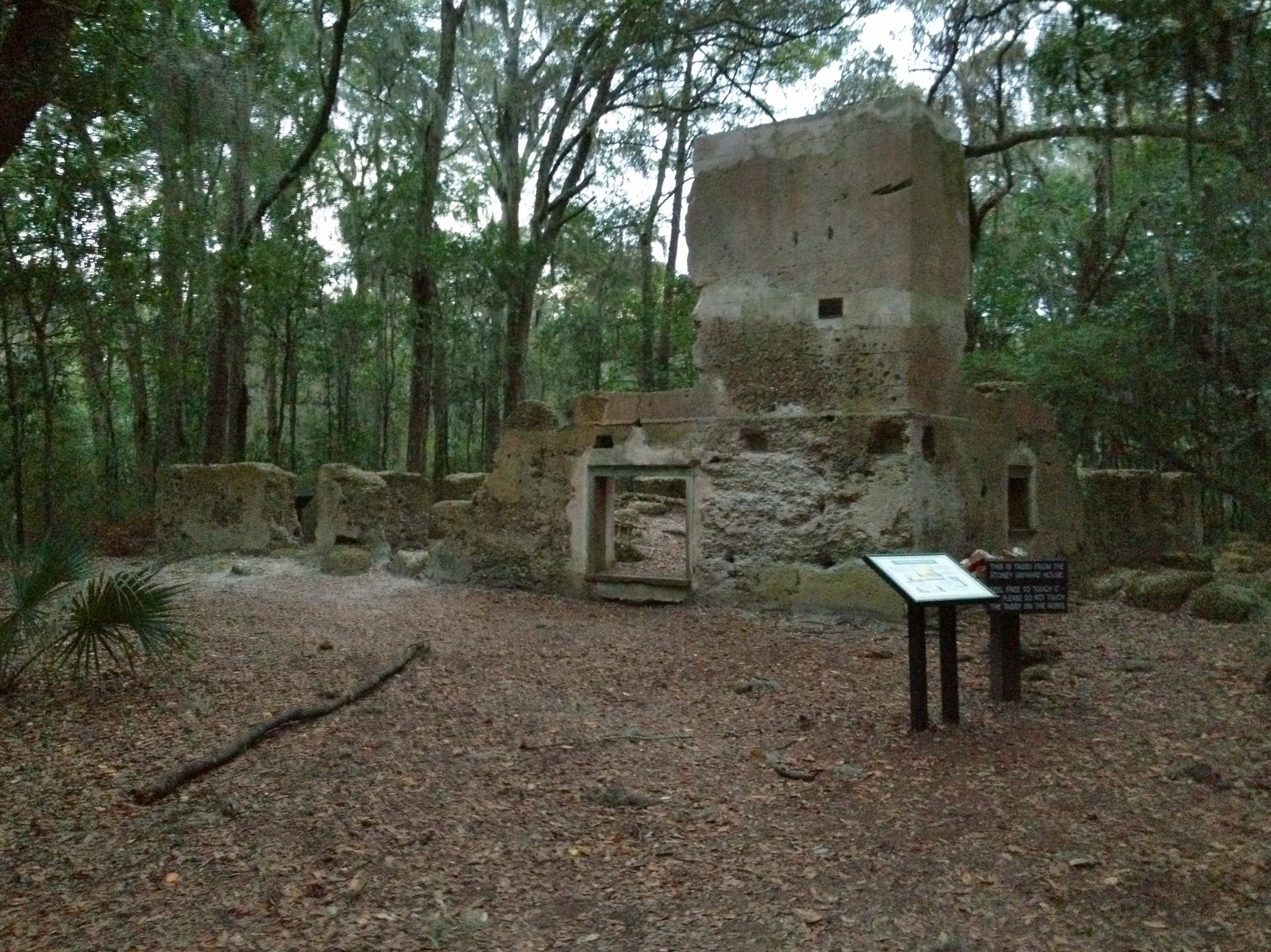
Stoney-Baynard Plantation

In 1698, Hilton Head Island was granted as part of a barony to John Bayley of Ballingclough, County of Tipperary, Kingdom of Ireland. Another John Bayley, son of the first, appointed Alexander Trench as the island's first retail agent. For a time, Hilton Head was known as Trench's Island. In 1729, Trench sold some land to John Gascoine which Gascoine named "John's Island" after himself. The land later came to be known as Jenkin's Island after another owner.

In the mid-1740s, the South Carolina provincial half-galley Beaufort was stationed in a cove at the southern tip of Hilton Head to guard against intrusions by the Spanish of St. Augustine. The point and cove are named after Captain David Cutler Braddock, commander of the Beaufort. Captain Braddock was a mariner and privateer of note in Colonial times. Earlier, he had been placed in command of the Georgia schooner Norfolk by James Oglethorpe, founder of Georgia, and helped chase the Spanish back to St. Augustine after their failed 1742 invasion of St. Simons Island. After relocating to Savannah in 1746, he served two terms in the Georgia Commons House of Assembly while earning a living as a highly active privateer. He drew a well-known chart of the Florida Keys while on a privateering venture in 1756. The chart is in the Library of Congress.

During the revolution there was only a very small population of farmers living on Hilton Head Island. This population was exclusively Loyalist, remaining allied to Parliament and the King throughout the entirety of the revolution. However, after the revolution they chose to simply "stay on" in South Carolina and make the best of living under the new republican form of government. In 1788, a small Episcopal church called the Zion Chapel of Ease was constructed for plantation owners. The chapel's old cemetery, located near the corner of William Hilton Parkway and Mathews Drive (Folly Field), is all that remains. Charles Davant, a prominent island planter during the Revolutionary War, is memorialized there. Davant was shot by Captain Martinangel of Daufuskie Island in 1781. This location is also home to the oldest intact structure on Hilton Head Island, the Baynard Mausoleum, which was built in 1846.

William Elliott II of Myrtle Bank Plantation grew the first crop of Sea Island Cotton in South Carolina on Hilton Head Island in 1790.

During the Civil War, Fort Walker was a Confederate fort in what is now Port Royal Plantation. The fort was a station for Confederate troops, and its guns helped protect the 2-mile-wide (3 km) entrance to Port Royal Sound, which is fed by two slow-moving and navigable rivers, the Broad River and the Beaufort River. It was vital to the Sea Island Cotton trade and the southern economy. On October 29, 1861, the largest fleet ever assembled in North America moved south to seize it. In the Battle of Port Royal, the fort came under attack by the U.S. Navy, and on November 7, 1861, it fell to over 12,000 Union troops. The fort was renamed Fort Welles, in honor of Gideon Welles, the Secretary of the Navy.

Hilton Head Island had tremendous significance in the Civil War and became an important base of operations for the Union blockade of the Southern ports, particularly Savannah and Charleston. The Union also built a military hospital on Hilton Head Island with a 1,200-foot (370 m) frontage and a floor area of 60,000 square feet (6,000 m^{2}).

Hundreds of ex-slaves flocked to Hilton Head Island, where they could buy land, go to school, live in government housing, and serve in what was called the First Regiment of South Carolina Volunteers (although in the beginning, many were "recruited" at the point of a bayonet). A community called Mitchelville (in honor of General Ormsby M. Mitchel) was constructed on the north end of the island to house them.

In an order from May 15, 1865, Major General Quincy Adams Gillmore, who was commanding the Department of the South with headquarters at Hilton Head declared that "the people of the black race are free citizens of the United States," whose rights must be respected accordingly. He issued an additional order while based in Hilton Head saying that any plantation owners who were found to have not informed African-Americans of their new status as free people would be "made liable to the pains and penalties of disloyalty, and their lands subject to confiscation" under the act establishing the Freedmen's Bureau. Martin Delany, the only black officer to reach the rank of major in the United States military during the Civil War, was also stationed at Hilton Head during this time.

The Leamington Lighthouse, also known as the Hilton Head Rear Range Lighthouse, was built in the 1870s on the southern edge of what is now Palmetto Dunes Oceanfront Resort.

In 1890, the wealthy shipping magnate William P. Clyde purchased 9,000 acres on Hilton Head Island for use as a private hunting preserve.

On August 27, 1893, the Sea Islands Hurricane made landfall near Savannah, with a storm surge of 16 feet (5 m), and swept north across South Carolina, killing over 1,000 people and leaving tens of thousands homeless.

=== 20th and 21st centuries ===
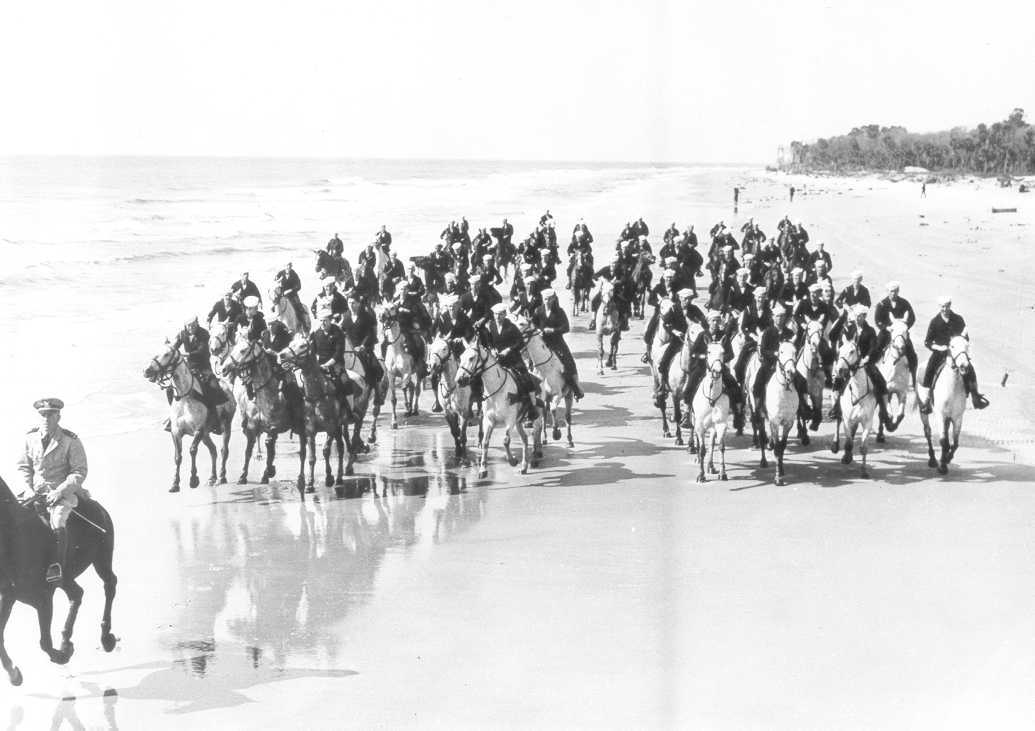
"The Beach Pounders" – U.S. Coast Guard Mounted Beach Patrol training on HHI during World War II.

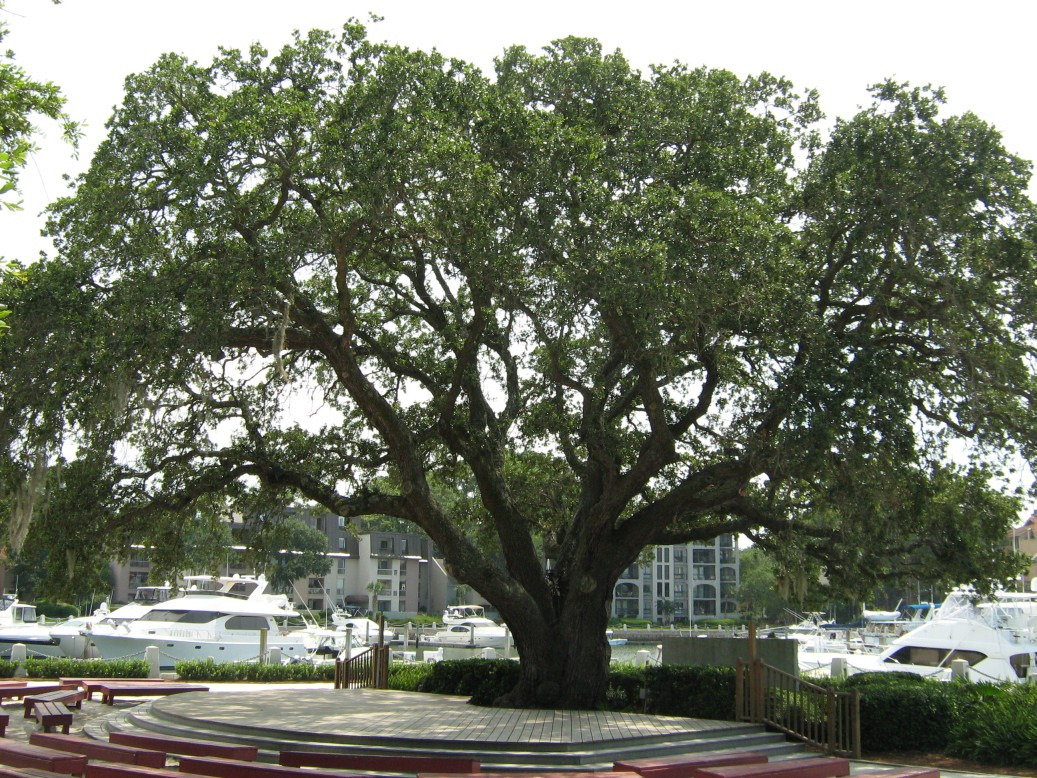
Liberty Oak in Harbour Town

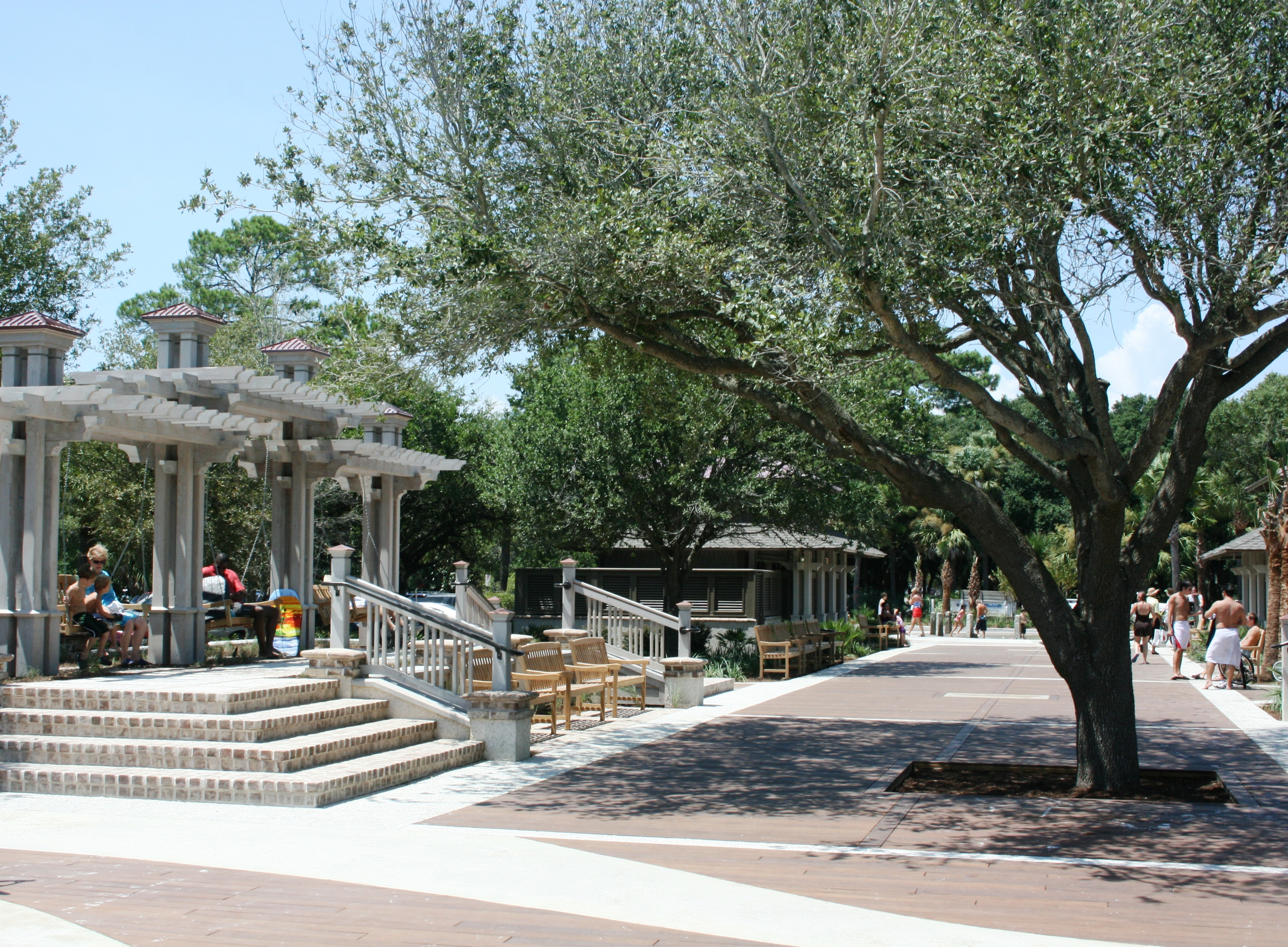
Coligny Circle Plaza. The plaza provides public beach access to island visitors.

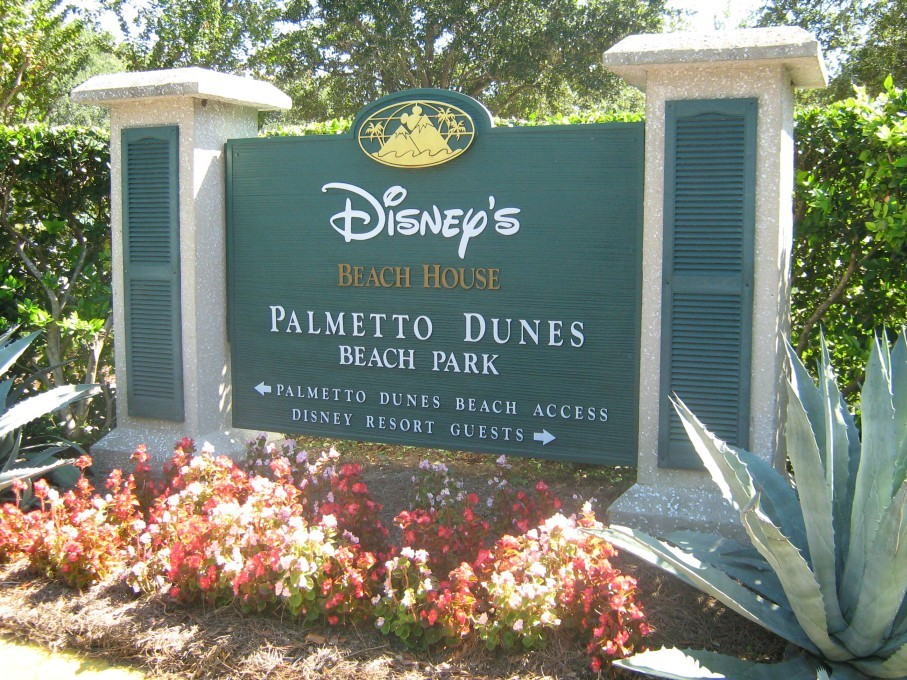
Disney's Hilton Head Island Resort

An experimental steam cannon guarding Port Royal Sound was built around 1900, in what is now Port Royal Plantation. The cannon was fixed but its propulsion system allowed for long-range shots for the time.

In 1931, Wall Street tycoon, physicist, and patron of scientific research Alfred Lee Loomis, along with his brother-in-law and partner Landon K. Thorne, purchased 17,000 acres (69 km^{2}) on the island (over 63% of the total landmass) for about $120,000 to be used as a private game reserve. On the Atlantic coast of the island, large concrete gun platforms were built to defend against a possible invasion by the Axis powers of World War II. Platforms like these can be found all along the Eastern Seaboard. The Mounted Beach Patrol and Dog Training Center on Hilton Head Island trained U.S. Coast Guard Beach Patrol personnel to use horses and dogs to protect the southeastern coastline of the U.S.

In the early 1950s, three lumber mills contributed to the logging of 19,000 acres (77 km^{2}) of the island. The island population was only 300 residents. Before 1956, access to Hilton Head was limited to private boats and a state-operated ferry. The island's economy centered on shipbuilding, cotton, lumbering, and fishing.

The James F. Byrnes Bridge was built in 1956. It was a two-lane toll swing bridge constructed at a cost of $1.5 million that opened the island to automobile traffic from the mainland. The swing bridge was hit by a barge in 1974, which shut down all vehicle traffic to the island until the Army Corps of Engineers built and manned a pontoon bridge while the bridge was being repaired. The swing bridge was replaced by the current four-lane bridge in 1982.

The beginning of Hilton Head as a resort started in 1956 with Charles E. Fraser developing Sea Pines Resort. Soon, other developments followed, such as Hilton Head Plantation, Palmetto Dunes Plantation, Shipyard Plantation, and Port Royal Plantation, imitating Sea Pines' architecture and landscaping. Sea Pines, however, continued to stand out by creating a unique locality within the plantation, called Harbour Town, anchored by a recognizable lighthouse. Fraser was a committed environmentalist who changed the whole configuration of the marina at Harbour Town to save an ancient live oak. It came to be known as the Liberty Oak, known to generations of children who watched singer and songwriter Gregg Russell perform under the tree for over 25 years. Fraser was buried next to the tree when he died in 2002.

The Heritage Golf Classic was first played in Sea Pines Resort in 1969 and has been a regular stop on the PGA Tour ever since. Also in 1969, the Hilton Head Island Community Association successfully fought off the development of a BASF chemical complex on the shores of Victoria Bluff (now Colleton River Plantation). Soon after, the association and other concerned citizens "south of the Broad" fought the development of off-shore oil platforms by Brown & Root (a division of Halliburton) and ten-story tall liquefied natural gas shipping spheres by Chicago Bridge & Iron. These events helped to energize the community, and the Chamber of Commerce started drumming up support for the town to incorporate as a municipality. After the Four Seasons Resort (now Hilton Head Resort) was built along William Hilton Parkway, a referendum of incorporation was passed in May 1983, where Hilton Head Island became a town.

The Land Management Ordinance was passed by the Town Council in 1987. Disney's Hilton Head Island Resort opened on March 1, 1996, and the Cross Island Parkway opened in January 1997. An indoor smoking ban in bars, restaurants, and public places took effect on May 1, 2007. Shelter Cove Towne Centre opened in 2014.

Fort Howell, Fort Mitchel, the Zion Cemetery and Baynard Mausoleum, Cherry Hill School, Daufuskie Island Historic District, Fish Haul Archaeological Site, Green's Shell Enclosure, Hilton Head Range Rear Light, Sea Pines, Skull Creek, SS William Lawrence Shipwreck Site, and Stoney-Baynard Plantation are listed on the National Register of Historic Places.

== Geography ==
=== Topography ===
Hilton Head Island is a shoe-shaped island that lies 20 miles (32 km) by air northeast of Savannah, Georgia, and 90 miles (140 km) south of Charleston.

According to the United States Census Bureau, the town has a total area of 69.13 square miles (179.0 km^{2}), of which 41.35 square miles (107.1 km^{2}) is land and 27.78 square miles (71.9 km^{2}) (40.19%) is water.

=== Barrier island ===
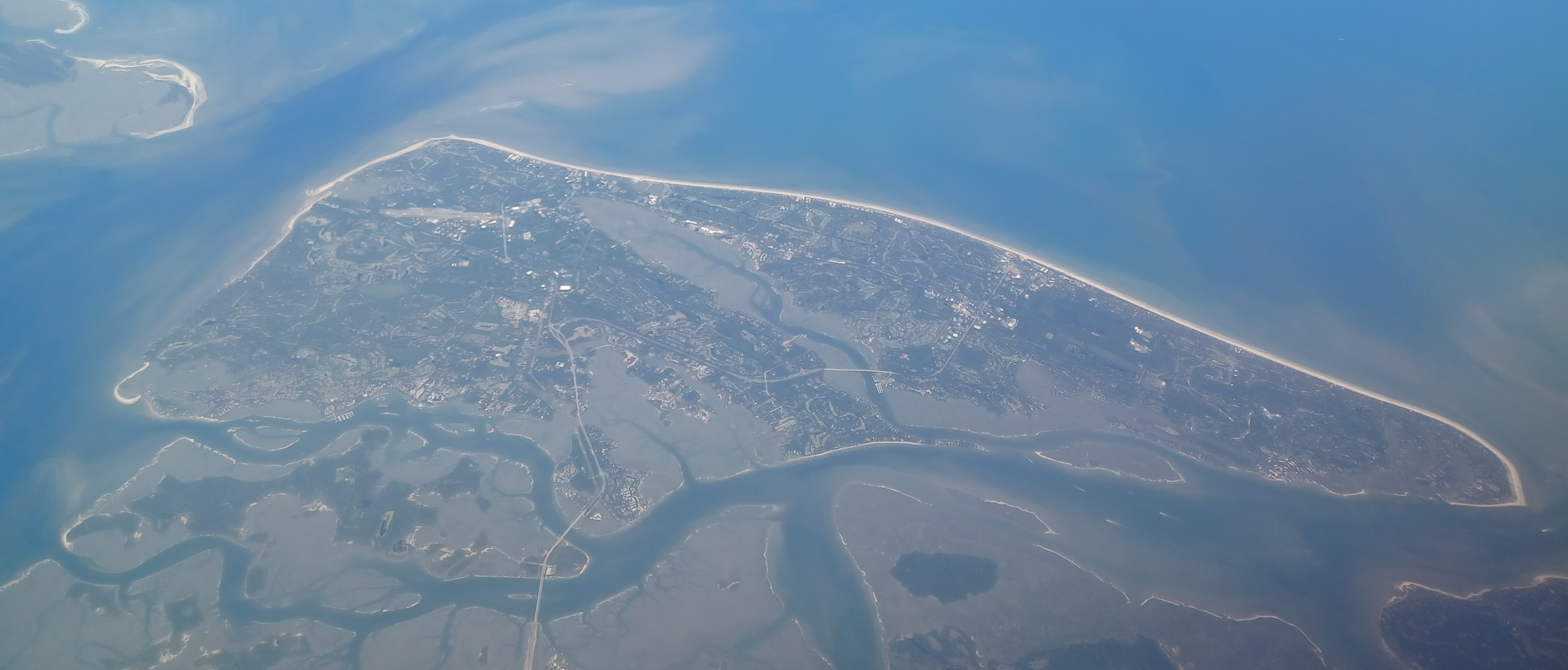
Aerial view of the island from the west in 2023

Hilton Head Island is sometimes referred to as the second largest barrier island on the Eastern Seaboard after Long Island (which is not a barrier island but two glacial moraines). Technically, however, Hilton Head Island is only a half barrier island. The north end of the island is a sea island dating to the Pleistocene epoch, and the south end is a barrier island that appeared as recently as the Holocene epoch. Broad Creek, which is a land-locked tidal marsh, separates the two halves of the island.

The terrain of a barrier island is determined by a dynamic beach system with offshore bars, pounding surf, and shifting beaches; as well as grassy dunes behind the beach, maritime forests with wetlands in the interiors, and salt or tidal marshes on the lee side, facing the mainland. A typical barrier island has a headland, a beach and surf zone, and a sand spit.

All soils of Hilton Head Island outside of tidal marshes are sandy. Their drainage ranges from excessive to somewhat poor.

=== Wildlife ===
The Hilton Head Island area is home to a vast array of wildlife, including alligators, deer, loggerhead sea turtles, West Indian manatee, hundreds of species of birds, and dolphins.

The Coastal Discovery Museum, in conjunction with the South Carolina Department of Natural Resources, patrols the beaches from May through October as part of the Sea Turtle Protection Project. The purpose of the project is to inventory and monitor nesting locations, and if necessary, move them to more suitable locations. During the summer months, the museum sponsors the Turtle Talk & Walk, which is a special tour designed to educate the public about this endangered species. To protect loggerhead sea turtles, a town ordinance stipulates that artificial lighting must be shielded so that it cannot be seen from the beach, or it must be turned off by 10:00 p.m. from May 1 to October 31 each year. The waters around Hilton Head Island are one of the few places on Earth where dolphins routinely use a technique called "strand feeding", whereby schools of fish are herded up onto mud banks, and the dolphins lie on their side while they feed before sliding back down into the water.

Particularly prominent in the ocean waters surrounding Hilton Head Island, the stingray serves as a fascination and painful natural encounter for many beachgoers. Small stingrays inhabit the quieter, shallow region of ocean floor just beyond the break of the surf, typically buried beneath a thin layer of sand. Stingrays are a type of demersal, cartilaginous fish common to the South Carolina coast as well as other areas on the Atlantic shoreline. Typically, stingrays avoid contact with humans unless they are accidentally stepped upon, a situation often ending in a stingray injury, where the stingray punctures the human with its poisonous barb. While these injuries are extremely painful, they are not usually life-threatening as long as they are properly attended to by a medical professional.

The saltmarsh estuaries of Hilton Head Island are the feeding grounds, breeding grounds, and nurseries for many saltwater species of game fish, sport fish, and marine mammals. The dense plankton population gives the coastal water its murky brown-green coloration.

Plankton support marine life including oysters, shrimp and other invertebrates, and bait-fish species including menhaden and mullet, which in turn support larger fish and mammal species that populate the local waterways. Popular sport fish in the Hilton Head Island area include the red drum (or spot tail bass), spotted sea trout, sheepshead, cobia, tarpon, and various shark species.

=== Climate ===
Hilton Head Island has a humid subtropical climate (Köppen climate classification Cfa), represented with humid, hot summers and mild winters. The hardiness zone is 9b on the side facing the ocean and 9a on the remainder of the island.

Climate data for Hilton Head Island
Month	Jan	Feb	Mar	Apr	May	Jun	Jul	Aug	Sep	Oct	Nov	Dec	Year
Mean daily maximum °F (°C)	61 (16)	63 (17)	69 (21)	71 (22)	82 (28)	87 (31)	90 (32)	88 (31)	85 (29)	78 (26)	70 (21)	63 (17)	76 (24)
Mean daily minimum °F (°C)	38 (3)	40 (4)	47 (8)	54 (12)	62 (17)	69 (21)	72 (22)	71 (22)	68 (20)	57 (14)	48 (9)	41 (5)	56 (13)
Average rainfall inches (mm)	3.7 (94)	3.5 (89)	3.9 (99)	3.0 (76)	3.6 (91)	5.3 (130)	6.2 (160)	8.9 (230)	5.1 (130)	2.6 (66)	2.4 (61)	3.2 (81)	51.4 (1,307)
Average rainy days	10	9	9	7	9	11	13	13	10	6	6	8	111
Mean monthly sunshine hours	186	197	248	270	279	270	279	248	210	217	180	186	2,770
Mean daily sunshine hours	6	7	8	9	9	9	9	8	7	7	6	6	8
Percentage possible sunshine	60	64	67	69	64	64	64	62	58	64	55	60	63
Average ultraviolet index	3	5	7	9	10	10	10	10	8	6	4	3	7
Source 1: Weatherbase
Source 2: Weather Atlas

Climate data for Hilton Head Island
Month	Jan	Feb	Mar	Apr	May	Jun	Jul	Aug	Sep	Oct	Nov	Dec	Year
Average sea temperature °F (°C)	57.9 (14.4)	57.4 (14.1)	58.1 (14.5)	65.3 (18.5)	72.3 (22.4)	79.2 (26.2)	82.9 (28.3)	83.5 (28.6)	81.7 (27.6)	77.0 (25.0)	69.1 (20.6)	61.5 (16.4)	70.5 (21.4)
Mean daily daylight hours	10	11	12	13	14	14	14	13	12	11	11	10	12.1
Source: Weather Atlas

== Demographics ==
Historical population
Census	Pop.	Note	%±
1990	23,694		—
2000	33,862		42.9%
2010	37,099		9.6%
2020	37,661		1.5%
2025 (est.)	38,196	▲	1.4%
U.S. Decennial Census

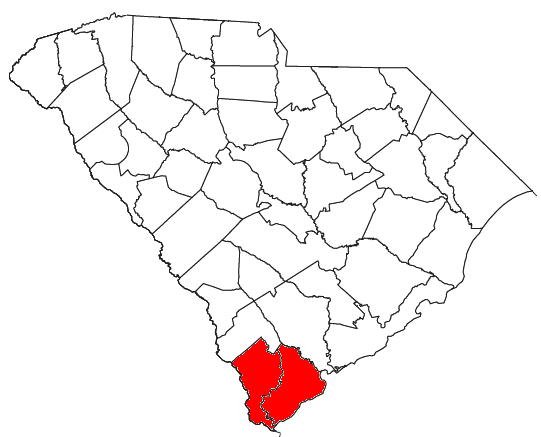
Location of the Hilton Head Island-Bluffton-Port Royal, SC Metropolitan Statistical Area

=== 2020 census ===
Hilton Head Island racial composition
Race	Num.	Perc.
White (non-Hispanic)	29,150	77.4%
Black or African American (non-Hispanic)	2,160	5.74%
Native American	46	0.12%
Asian	286	0.76%
Pacific Islander	5	0.01%
Other/Mixed	969	2.57%
Hispanic or Latino	5,045	13.4%

As of the 2020 census, Hilton Head Island had a population of 37,661. The median age was 59.3 years. 13.4% of residents were under the age of 18 and 39.6% were 65 years of age or older. For every 100 females, there were 90.9 males, and for every 100 females age 18 and over, there were 89.7 males age 18 and over.

98.7% of residents lived in urban areas, while 1.3% lived in rural areas.

There were 17,329 households in Hilton Head Island, including 11,692 families, and 16.3% had children under the age of 18 living in them. Of all households, 56.6% were married-couple households, 13.7% were households with a male householder and no spouse or partner present, and 25.1% were households with a female householder and no spouse or partner present. About 28.0% of all households were made up of individuals and 16.9% had someone living alone who was 65 years of age or older.

There were 29,018 housing units, of which 40.3% were vacant. The homeowner vacancy rate was 2.0% and the rental vacancy rate was 21.2%.

=== 2010 census ===
At the 2010 census, there were 37,099 people, 16,535 households, and 10,700 families residing in the town, occupying a land area of 42.06 square miles (109 km^{2}). The population density was 882.0 inhabitants per square mile (340.5/km^{2}). There were 33,602 housing units at an average density of 798.9 per square mile (308.5/km^{2}).

The racial makeup of the town was 82.9% White, 7.5% African American, 0.2% Native American, 0.9% Asian, 0.1% Pacific Islander, 7.3% from other races, and 1.2% from two or more races. Hispanic or Latino of any race were 15.8% of the population.

Of the 16,535 households, 18.4% had children under the age of 18 living with them, 54.7% were married couples living together, 6.8% had a female householder with no husband present, and 35.3% were non-families. 28.3% of all households were made up of individuals, and 14.0% had someone living alone who was 65 years of age or older. The average household size was 2.23 and the average family size was 2.66.

In the town, the population was spread out, with 18% under the age of 20, 4.4% from 20 to 24, 20.4% from 25 to 44, 28.4% from 45 to 64, and 28.8% who were 65 years of age or older. The median age was 50.9 years. For every 100 females, there were 103.8 males. For every 100 females age 18 and over, there were 105.5 males.

=== Demographic estimates ===
Although the town occupies most of the land area of the island, it is not coterminous with it; there is a small part near the main access road from the mainland, William Hilton Parkway, which is not incorporated into the town. Hilton Head (the island) therefore has a slightly higher population (48,407 in Census 2000, defined as the Hilton Head Island Urban Cluster) and a larger land area (42.65 sq mi or 110.5 km^{2}) than the town. The Hilton Head Island-Bluffton-Port Royal, SC Metropolitan Statistical Area, which includes Beaufort and Jasper counties, had a 2012 estimated year-round population of 193,882.

=== Income and poverty ===
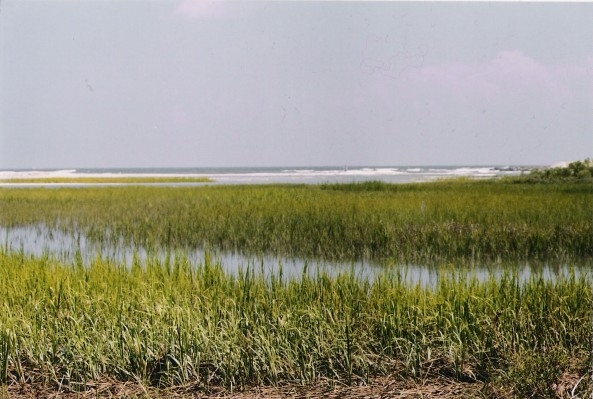
Looking over the tidal marsh to the Folly

According to a 2014 estimate, the median income for a household in the town was $68,437, and the median income for a family was $85,296. Males had a median income of $51,463 versus $36,743 for females. The per capita income for the town was $45,116. About 5.4% of families and 9.3% of the population were below the poverty line, including 16.9% of those under age 18 and 3.9% of those age 65 or over.

=== Ancestry ===
As of 2020, the largest self-reported ancestry groups in Hilton Head Island were:

Ancestry	Percent (2020)
English	47.5%
Irish	10.1%
German	2.2%
Italian	2.1%
American	1.9%
Greek	1.3%
Scotch-Irish	0.9%
French (except Basque)	0.7%

== Economy ==
According to Hilton Head Island's 2025 Annual Comprehensive Financial Report, the top employers in the town are:

#	Employer	# of Employees
1	SERG Group Restaurants	841
2	Coastal Restaurants and Bars	715
3	Sea Pines Resort	687
4	Hilton Head Medical Center & Clinics	533
5	Marriott Vacation Club	514
6	Beaufort County School District	444
7	Greenwood Communities & Resorts	415
8	Cypress of Hilton Head	339
9	Publix Super Markets	328
10	Town of Hilton Head Island	300

== Parks and recreation ==
=== Public beach access ===
- Alder Lane Beach Access – 22 metered spaces
- Burkes Beach Access – 13 metered spaces and additional free spaces located slightly farther from the beach.
- Coligny Beach Park — parking is free — some parking reserved for annual beach passes from 8:00 a.m. to 3:00 p.m.
- Driessen Beach Park – 207 long term parking spaces — some parking reserved for annual beach passes from 8:00 a.m. to 3:00 p.m.
- Fish Haul Park — parking is free
- Folly Field Beach Park – 51 metered spaces
- Islanders Beach Park — annual beach pass parking only
- Mitchelville Beach Park — parking is free

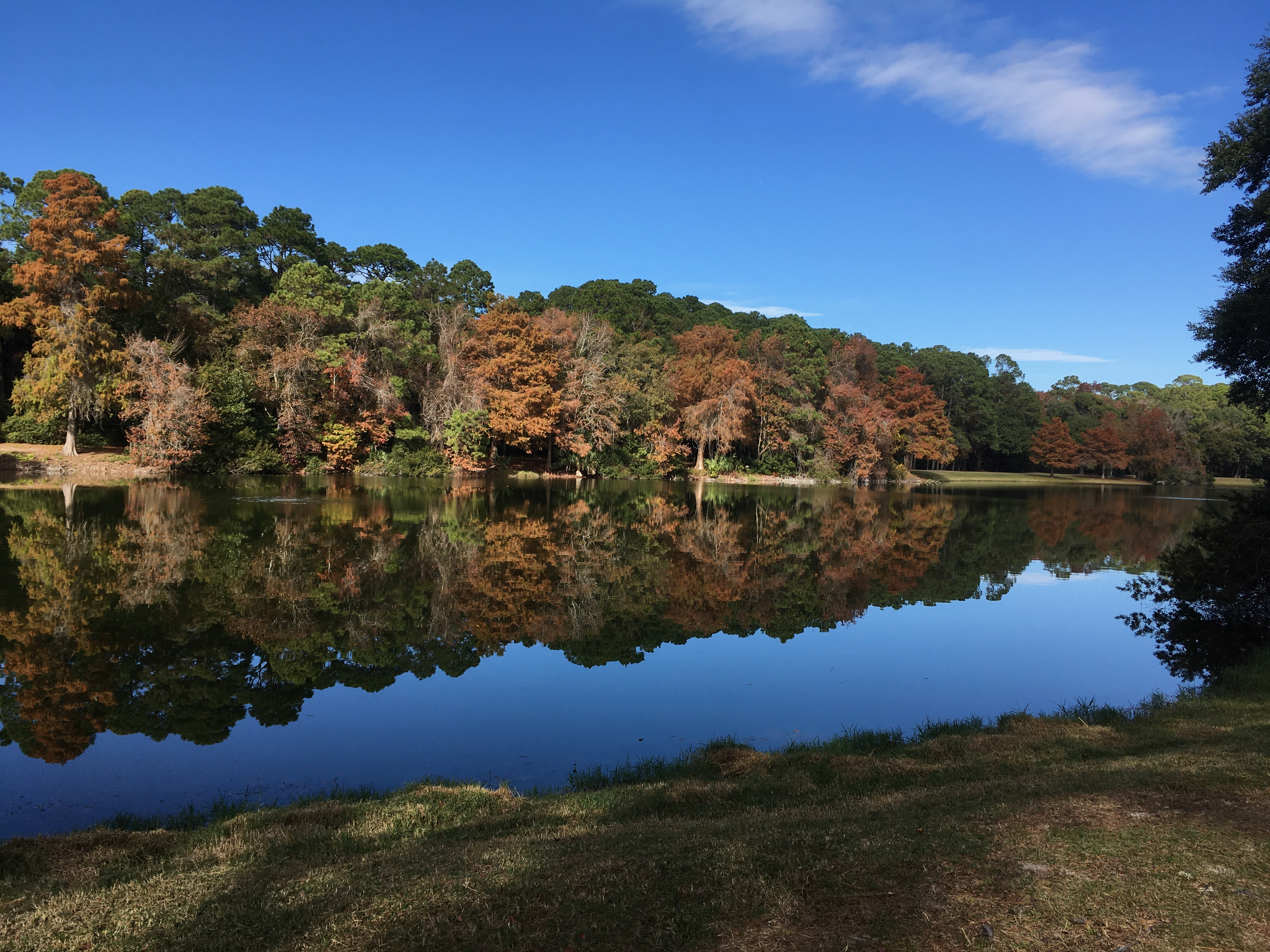
View of Lake Joe, Sea Pines Forest Preserve, Hilton Head Island, SC

=== Island parks ===
- Alder Lane Beach Access
- Audubon Newhall Preserve
- Barker Field
- Burkes Beach Access
- Broad Creek Boat Ramp
- Chaplin Community Park
- Coligny Beach Park
- Compass Rose Park
- Cordillo Tennis Courts
- Crossings Park & Bristol Sports Arena
- Driessen Beach Park
- Fish Haul Creek Park
- Folly Field Beach Park
- Green Shell Park
- Hilton Head Park (Old Schoolhouse Park)
- Islanders Beach Park
- Jarvis Creek Park
- Marshland Road Boat Landing
- Old House Creek Dock
- Sea Pines Forest Preserve
- Shelter Cove Community Park
- Xeriscape Garden

== Government ==
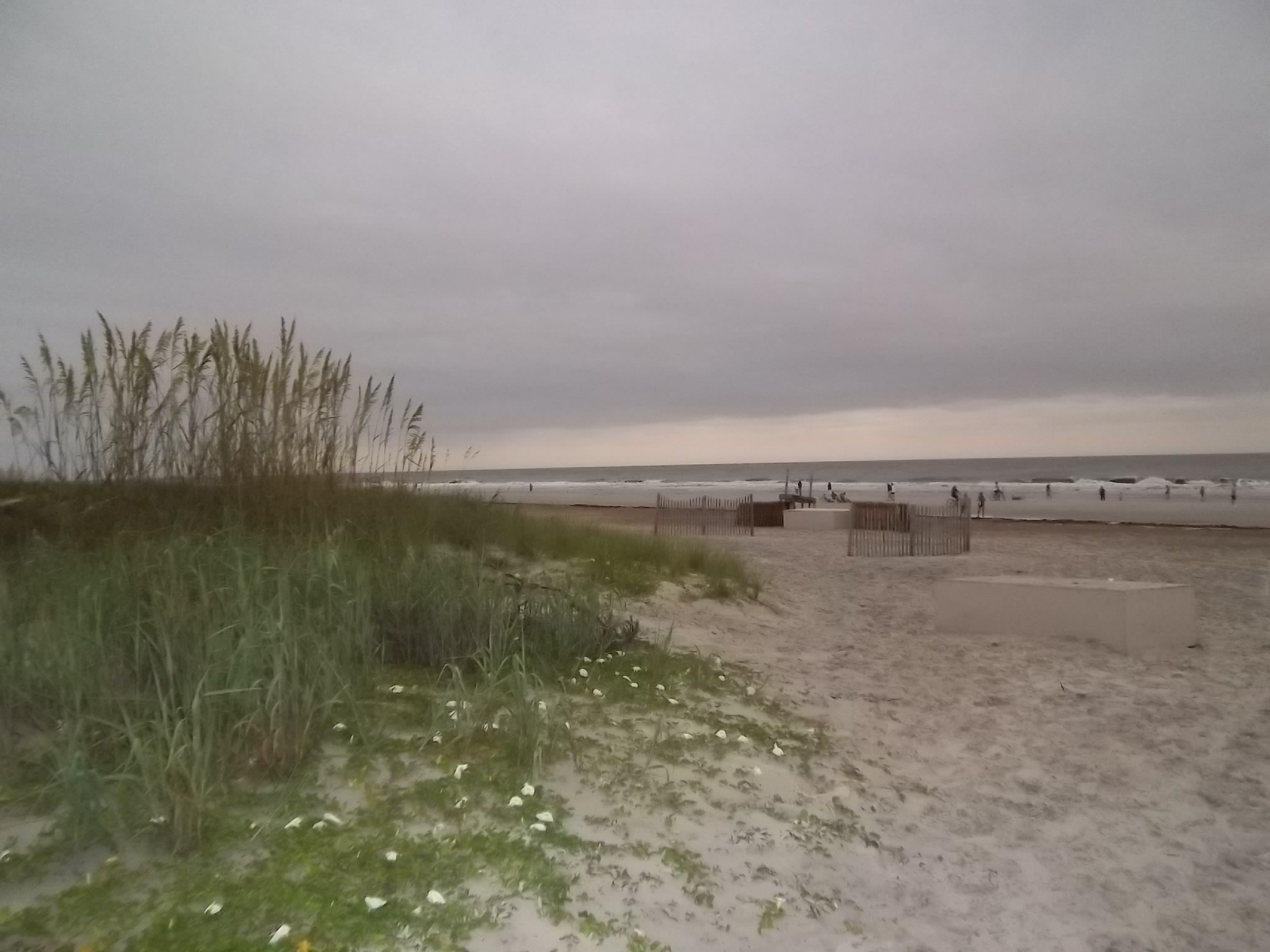
Hilton Head Island in the summer of 2012

Live oaks with Spanish moss on Hilton Head Island

The Town of Hilton Head Island incorporated as a municipality in 1983 and has jurisdiction over the entire island except Mariner's Cove, Blue Heron Point, and Windmill Harbor. The Town of Hilton Head Island has a Council-Manager form of government. The Town Manager is the chief executive officer and head of the administrative branch and is responsible to the municipal council for the proper administration of all the affairs of the town. The Town Council exercises all powers not specifically delegated to the Town Manager. The Mayor has the same powers, duties, and responsibilities as a member of the Town Council. Also, the Mayor establishes the agenda for Town Council meetings, calls special meetings, executes contracts, deeds, resolutions, and proclamations not designated to the Town Manager, and represents the town at ceremonial functions.

The mayor is Alan Perry.

== Education ==
=== Schools ===
==== Public schools ====
Public schools are operated by the Beaufort County School District, which covers the community.

- Hilton Head Island Early Childhood Center (Pre K — K)
- Hilton Head Island School for the Creative Arts (Grades 1–5)
- Hilton Head Island International Baccalaureate Elementary School (Grades 1–5)
- Hilton Head Island Middle School
- Hilton Head Island High School

==== Private schools ====
- Hilton Head Preparatory School
- Hilton Head Christian Academy
- St. Francis Catholic School
- Heritage Academy
- Sea Pines Montessori Academy
- The Island Academy of Hilton Head

=== Library ===
Hilton Head has a public library, a branch of the Beaufort County Library.

== Infrastructure ==
=== Airport ===
Hilton Head Island is served by the Hilton Head Airport which is owned by Beaufort County. American Airlines, Delta Air Lines, and United Airlines serve the airport. In the first half of 2019, the airport saw a 225% increase in passengers arriving and departing, when compared with the same time period one year prior. This was attributed to new air service and added seat capacity, made possible by the airport's 2018 runway expansion.

Savannah/Hilton Head International Airport is in nearby Savannah, Georgia.

=== Emergency services ===
Hilton Head Island Fire & Rescue began operations July 1, 1993, as a consolidation of the former Sea Pines Forest Beach Fire Department, the Hilton Head Island Fire District, and the Hilton Head Island Rescue Squad. There are seven fire stations and one fire warehouse on Hilton Head Island.

Police services are contracted through Beaufort County Sheriff's Office. The island is equipped with an enhanced 9-1-1 system.

=== Public transportation ===
Hilton Head Island is served seasonally by The Breeze public trolley service which is provided by the Lowcountry Regional Transit Authority.

== Notable people ==
- Arthur Blank, owner NFL Atlanta Falcons and Home Depot, has a house in Sea Pines Resort
- William P. Clyde, owner and president of the Clyde Steamship Company
- Patricia Cornwell, crime fiction author of Hornet's Nest (set in Charlotte) and others, a NY Times Best Selling Author
- Bobby Cremins, former NCAA men's basketball coach, currently resides in Charleston, but maintains a home in Hilton Head
- Wilbur Cross, author
- Dan Driessen, former Major League Baseball player; Cincinnati Reds and others
- Jim Ferree, golfer on PGA Tour and Senior PGA Tour
- Poona Ford, NFL football defensive tackle, played for the Texas Longhorns in college
- Sam Gilman, middle- and long-distance runner
- Trevor Hall, reggae/folk rock singer-songwriter on Now 40, was raised in Hilton Head
- Ryan Hartman, NHL player
- Darrell Hedric, former head basketball coach at Miami University (Ohio), former NBA scout
- John Jakes, author of historical fiction like North and South (set in Charleston), resides in Hilton Head, a NY Times Best Selling Author
- Michael Jordan, former NBA basketball player, had a house on Hilton Head from 1988 to 1999
- Sterling Knight, actor, singer, and dancer
- John V. Lindsay, former mayor of New York City, died in Hilton Head on December 19, 2000
- John Mellencamp, Rock and Roll Hall of Fame singer-songwriter from Bloomington, Indiana
- Mark Messier, Canadian former NHL player, part-time resident of Hilton Head
- Carmen Mlodzinski, Major League Baseball pitcher
- Garry Moore, television variety-show and game-show host
- Gaston Moore, football player
- Sean O'Haire, former professional wrestler and mixed martial artist
- Charles W. G. Rich, U.S. Army lieutenant general
- Gregg Russell, children's singer, performed under the old oak tree in Harbour Town since 1976
- Serge Savard, former Montreal Canadiens defenseman and general manager
- Duncan Sheik, singer-songwriter of the 1997 Grammy-nominated song "Barely Breathing", writer of the hit Broadway show Spring Awakening, was raised in Hilton Head
- Stan Smith, tennis pro, 1972 Wimbledon, 1971 US Open and Davis Cup champion
- Jaylen Sneed, college football player for the Notre Dame Fighting Irish
- Col. Benjamin H. Vandervoort, WWII hero, died in his home on Hilton Head in 1990 at the age of 75
- Kathryn R. Wall: author of mystery novels
- Lois Rhame West, First Lady of South Carolina (1971–1975), first woman to chair the Muscular Dystrophy Association
- Jayson Williams: former NBA basketball player, owns a home on Hilton Head
- Hannah Wicklund, blues rock singer-songwriter, born and raised in Hilton Head

== See also ==
- List of municipalities in South Carolina
