= Bald Rock, Nova Scotia =

Community in Nova Scotia, Canada

Coordinates: 44°28′8.5″N 63°34′56.2″W

Bald Rock in Nova Scotia

Bald Rock is a rural community of the Halifax Regional Municipality in the Canadian province of Nova Scotia, located on Cape Sambro on the southeast shore of the Chebucto Peninsula.
