= Bald Rock Dome =

Mountain in California, United States

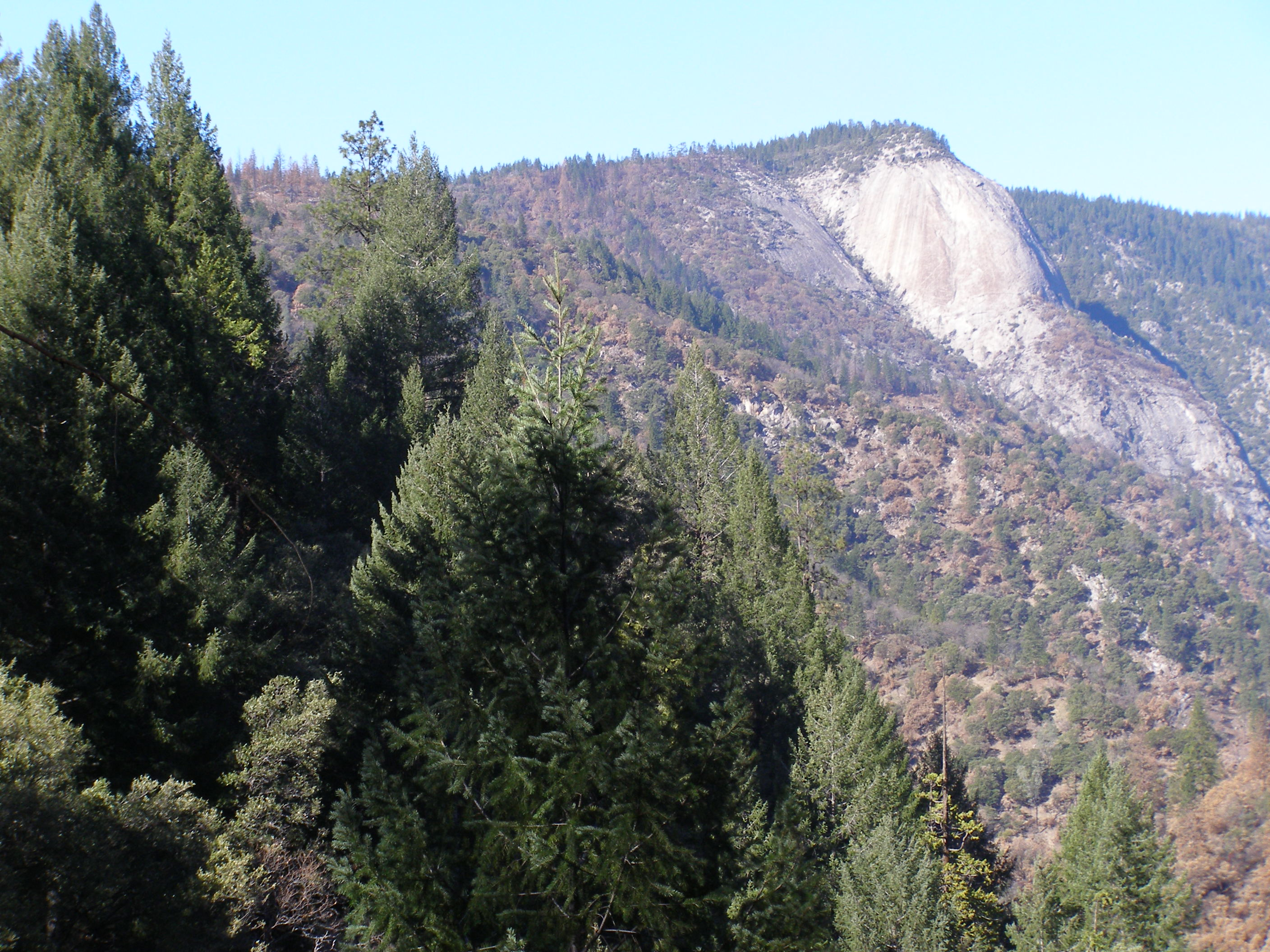

Highest point
- Elevation: 3,509 ft (1,070 m) NGVD 29
- Coordinates: 39°39′16″N 121°18′39″W

Geography
- Location within California
- Location: Butte County, California, U.S.
- Topo map: USGS Brush Creek

Geology
- Mountain type: Granite batholith

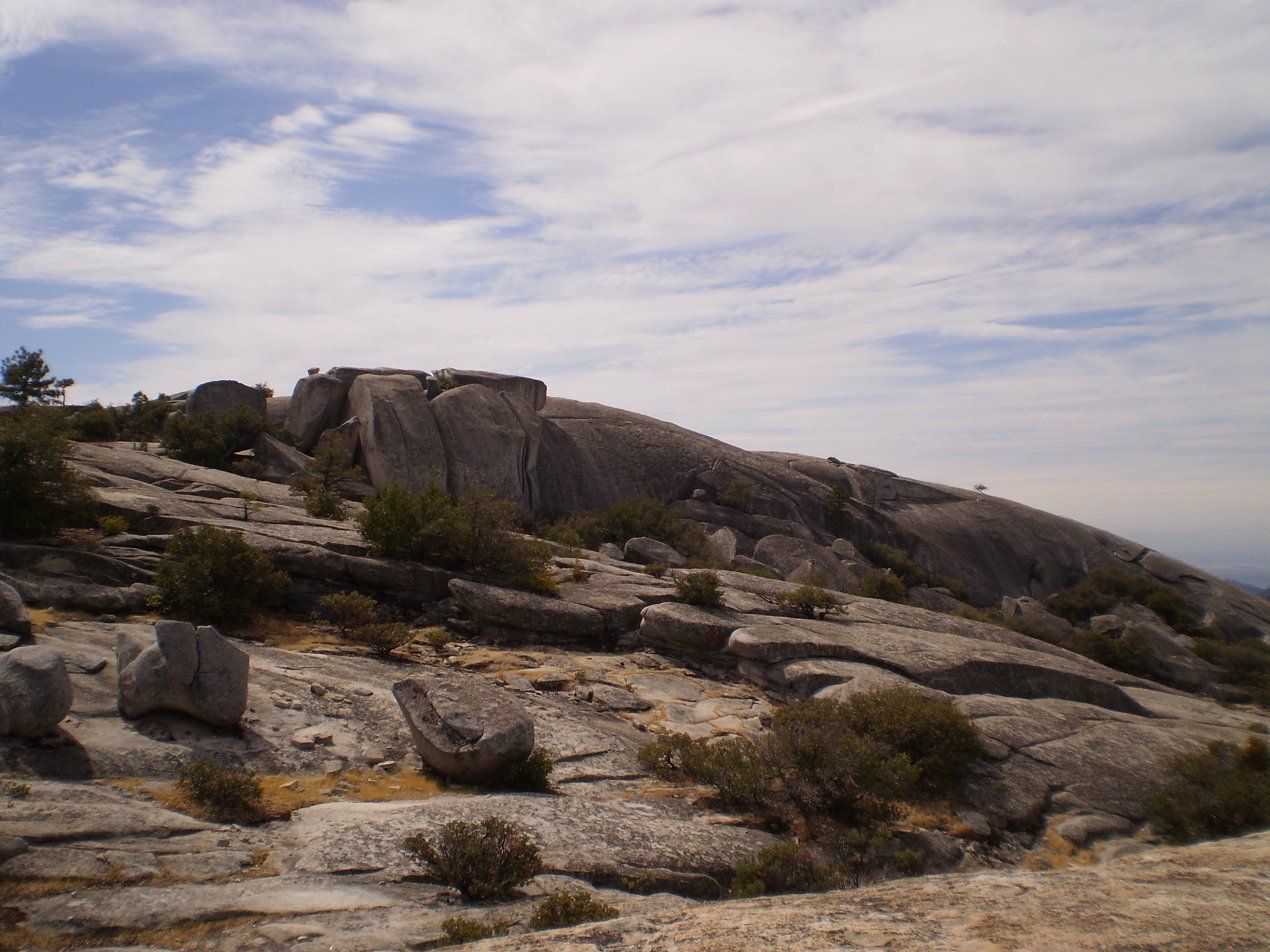
Near the top of the dome

Bald Rock is a granite summit located in Butte County, California, in the Plumas National Forest. Located close to Lake Oroville, the dome peak overlooks Sacramento Valley and coastal mountain ranges.

== History ==
The area was once home to the Maidu, a tribe of indigenous people. They left the rock with many unique features, such as, metate, grinding holes used to prepare acorns and grains.

== Recreation ==
A short trail leads through the woods to the rock, which includes several crevasses and peculiar rock formations. The area is used for hiking, climbing, and rappeling. Camping is allowed but not closer than 300 yards from running water. The site also includes the ruin of a small shelter made from stacked rocks.

== Fauna ==
The area is home to several animal species, including snakes, deer, mountain lion, and black bear.

== See also ==
- Brush Creek, California, the nearest town
