= Green's Shell Enclosure =

Archaeological site in South Carolina, United States

- U.S. National Register of Historic Places
- Nearest city: Hilton Head Island, South Carolina
- Area: 2 acres (0.81 ha)
- MPS: Historic Resources of the Late Archaic-Early Woodland Period Shell Rings of South Carolina, ca. 1,000-2,200 years B.C.
- NRHP reference No.: 74001825
- Added to NRHP: August 7, 1974

Green's Shell Enclosure is a historic archeological site located at Hilton Head Island, Beaufort County, South Carolina. The site includes one of 20 or more prehistoric Indian shell middens in a ring shape located from the central coast of South Carolina to the central coast of Georgia. They are believed to date early in the second millennium BC, and they contain some of the earliest pottery known in North America.

It was listed in the National Register of Historic Places in 1974.

== Work at Green’s Shell Enclosure ==
Green's Shell Enclosure was first documented by Alan Calmes in 1967 (site number 38BU63). Calmes founded that the shell ring was constructed of oyster shells and was created in a relatively short period of time, suggesting that the peoples whom constructed it did not live within or around the shell ring. The pattern of the arrangement of the oyster shells, which were loosely packed rather than in strategic bands gives the evidence of the fast building process. The other evidence suggesting that the ring was built relatively quickly is that nearly all of the pottery and stone remains were of Irene types. The Irene phase was a period between approximately A.D. 1200 and A.D. 1550. The artifacts found at Green's Shell Enclosure were created near this time period, which is also suggested from the radiocarbon-14 date of A.D. 1335, of the charcoal and Irene sherd samples from six to eight inches below the surface.

Green's Shell Enclosure was revisited in 1987 by Michael Trinkley. Trinkley suggests that the Green Shell Enclosure may have been occupied in the South Carolina Late Woodland Period (ca. A.D. 1000 to 1650). Trinkley suggests this because during this time, outside of the Carolinas, there was a period of widespread cultural change including the progressive practices of agriculture, however it appears that the peoples in the Carolinas continued a mobile lifestyle pattern with short-term occupation of sites. This supports Calmes original theory that Green's Shell Enclosure was built in a short period of time, because the people creating it were still living a partially nomadic lifestyle.

== Native Occupation ==
Documented by Calmes, “The Indians believed to be associated with the site can be identified by documentary evidence as Orista, Escumacu, or Cusabo Indians, all of the same group.” Trinkely suggests that the possibility of the Orista or Escumacu within South Carolina were chiefdoms of the Georgia Guale Indians. There is evidence to suggest the occupation of the Escumacu Indians within Beaufort County, however it is also known that many of the coastal tribes of the Carolinas were wiped out by war, slavery and European expansion before any documentation of them was ever taken.
