= Bald Rock Heritage Preserve =

State preserve in South Carolina, US

Coordinates: 35.083°N 82.617°W

Bald Rock Heritage Preserve is a state preserve in Cleveland, South Carolina, within the Mountain Bridge Wilderness Area and managed by the South Carolina Department of Natural Resources. It is near Caesars Head State Park and overlooks Table Rock. Bald Rock is accessible via footbridge from a parking area off of U.S. Route 276. The property is closed at night (sunset to sunrise). No graffiti, alcohol, drugs, fires (or fireworks), camping, or littering is allowed on the property.
