= Deveaux Bank, South Carolina =

Island in the United States of America

Deveaux Bank
- Location within South Carolina

Geography
- Location: Atlantic Ocean
- Coordinates: 32.549°N 80.181°W
- Area: .33 sq mi (0.85 km^{2})
- Length: 1 mi (2 km)
- Width: 1.2 mi (1.9 km)
- Highest elevation: 3 ft (0.9 m)

Administration
- United States
- State: South Carolina
- County: Charleston County

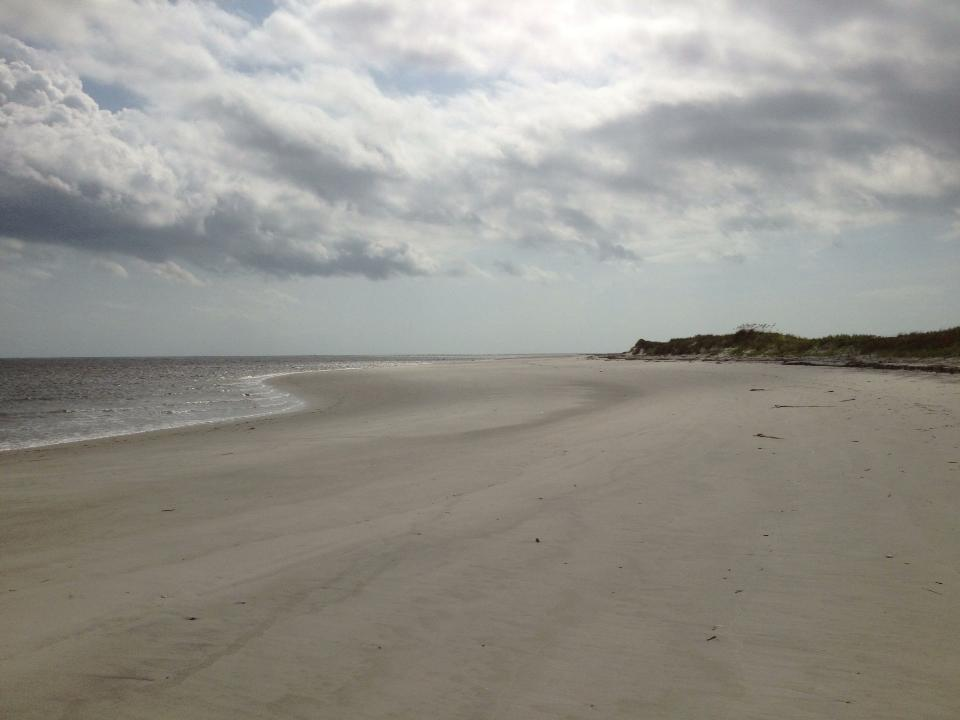
North shore of Deveaux Bank beach looking east

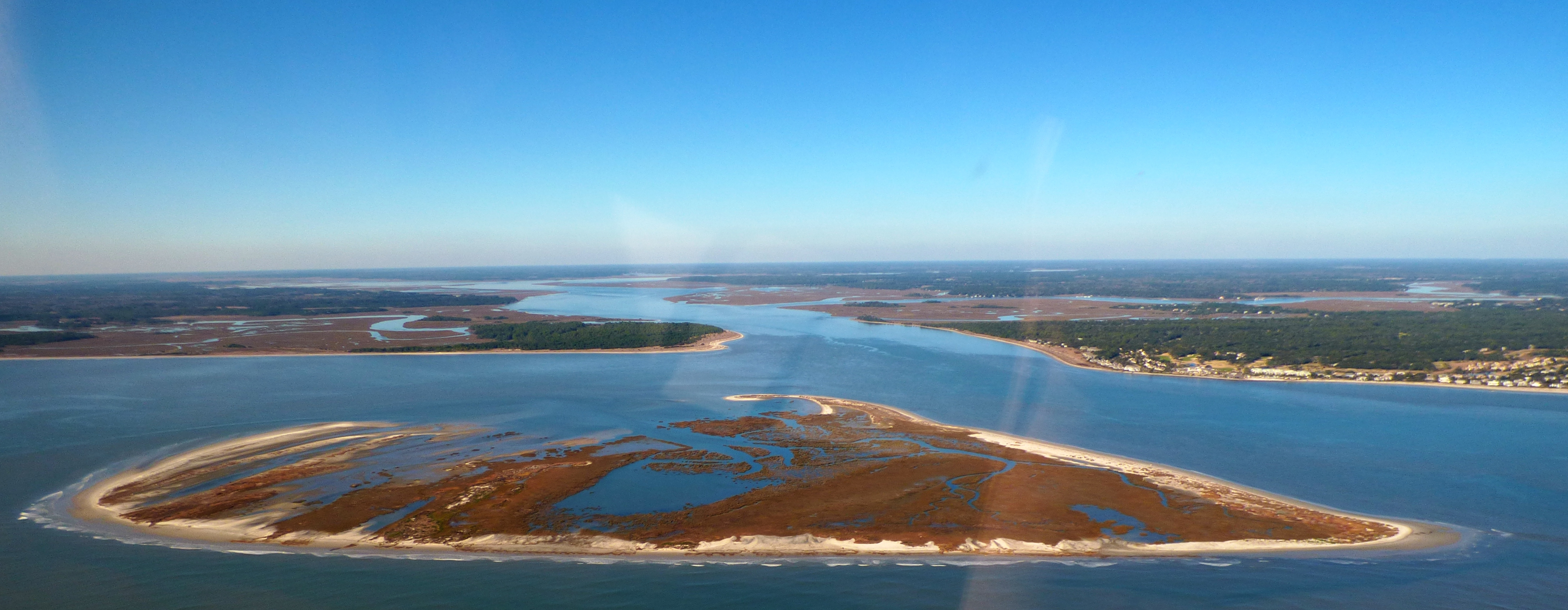
An aerial shot of Deveaux Bank looking back towards the mainland with Botany Bay to the left and Seabrook Island to the right.

Deveaux Bank is a horseshoe-shaped sand spit island encompassing a 215-acre (87-hectare) bird sanctuary at the mouth of the North Edisto River in Charleston County, South Carolina. It is located on the Atlantic Coast between Edisto Island, South Carolina and Seabrook Island, South Carolina. Its average elevation is three feet. It has approximately 2.75 miles (4.43 kilometres) of sandy beaches on four sides (some of which are completely submerged at high tides) and a tidal lagoon on the side facing the mainland.

== History ==
Deveaux bank was first documented in 1921 and by the 1930s was an established seabird rookery. During World War II, Deveaux Bank was used as a bombing range. The bank was completely submerged by Hurricane David in 1979 and tidal shifts that followed the next spring. Over the next several years the island continued to rebuild as sand was deposited by currents.

== Today ==
Currents cause the shape of the island to constantly shift. Due to a lack of land predators, the island has become a heavily utilized bird nesting area. It is protected by the South Carolina Department of Natural Resources. Landings may only be done below the high-water line. Dogs are prohibited and overnight camping is also prohibited.

=== Flora ===
Plant species on the island include:

- Russian thistle, Echinops exaltatus
- marsh hay
- camphorweed
- beach elder
- beach tea
- dog fennel

=== Fauna ===
Observed species vary from year-to-year but include:

- Brown pelican
- Royal tern
- Least tern
- Wilson's plover
- Sandwich tern
- Black skimmer
- Tricolored heron
- Snowy egret
- Great egret
- Gull-billed tern
- Willet
- American oystercatcher
- Laughing gull
- Ibis
- Hudsonian whimbrel
