= Nipper Creek (38RD18) =

Archaeological site in South Carolina, United States

- U.S. National Register of Historic Places
- Nearest city: Columbia, South Carolina
- Area: 55 acres (22 ha)
- NRHP reference No.: 86003474
- Added to NRHP: December 24, 1986

Nipper Creek (38RD18) is a historic archaeological site located at Columbia, South Carolina. The site includes archaeological evidence that documents 11,000 years of human activity, from the first Paleo-Indian occupants of the region to historic times.

It was added to the National Register of Historic Places in 1986.
