= History of Beaufort, South Carolina =

The history of Beaufort, South Carolina, is one of the most comprehensive and diverse of any community of its size in the United States.

== Overview ==
The area had been subject to numerous European explorations and several aborted attempts at colonization. Scottish immigrants founded the short-lived "Stuart Town" in 1684, and the British successfully founded the city of Beaufort in 1711, the second-oldest in South Carolina (behind Charleston). The city initially grew slowly, subject to numerous attacks from Native Americans before flourishing as a regional center for the Lowcountry plantation economy up through the Civil War. The community rebounded in the later half of the 20th century and is today recognized as one of the most livable small towns in the country. Beaufort has retained much of its historic character through its renowned architecture and historic preservation efforts.

== Colonial period: 1711–1783 ==
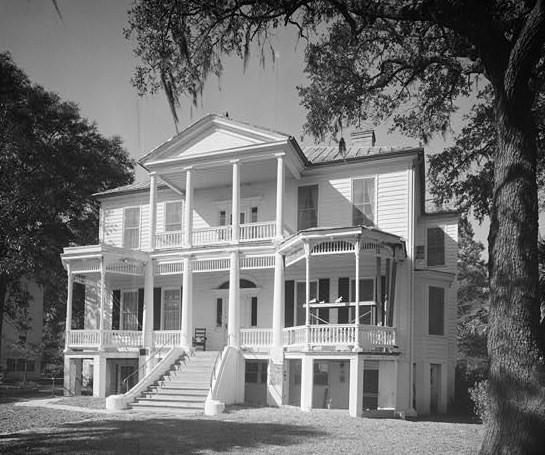
The John A. Cuthbert House is an example of antebellum architecture in Beaufort

Written history began 500 years ago with the exploration of the area by Spanish Captain Pedro de Salazar between 1514 and 1516. Thus, Beaufort County was the site of the second landing on the North American continent by Europeans; the first landing—Ponce de Leon at or near modern St. Augustine, Florida—was only a year or so earlier in 1513.

Beaufort was chartered in 1711 as the second major settlement in South Carolina and named after Henry Somerset, 2nd Duke of Beaufort. The settlement grew very slowly, due to a major attack by the Yemassee in 1717 and the threat of Spanish invasion. It was not until 1733 and the founding of Georgia as a buffer colony did Beaufort truly grow in population and prestige. Though most administrative powers during the early Carolina colony was focused in Charleston, the city gained a reputation for its excellent harbor and the establishment of several church congregations, most notable being St. Helena's Episcopal. By 1776, the city became well known for its shipbuilding enterprises, its rice and indigo trade, and was home to a new circuit court for the colony.

The American Revolution split loyalties in the community, with several families supporting the Tories while others favored independence. Many men fought in battles elsewhere in the state, though little warfare was conducted in and around Beaufort. Following the 1778 capture of nearby Savannah, Georgia, British forces moved to occupy Port Royal Island in late January 1779, but were repulsed by militia under the command of William Moultrie in the Battle of Beaufort. The area was successfully occupied by the British later in 1779, but they withdrew when Savannah came under siege. Most of coastal South Carolina was dominated by British forces after the 1780 Siege of Charleston. After the American victory in the 1781 Siege of Yorktown, the British Army began moving out of the Lowcountry in the summer of 1782. Unlike other regions such as Massachusetts and St. Augustine, Florida, virtually all of the Loyalists in Beaufort decided to stay. South Carolina's leading patriots including the "Swamp Fox" Francis Marion and the "Game Cock" Thomas Sumter were all instrumental in convincing South Carolina's Loyalist community not to leave, and in ensuring that their property and they themselves would be respected in the new country. This effort was successful, and in Beaufort virtually no Loyalists ended up leaving after the war. The Treaty of Beaufort fixing the boundary between South Carolina and Georgia was signed in the city in 1787.

== Antebellum period: 1783–1861 ==
In the mid to late antebellum period, the rise of Carolina Gold rice and Sea Island Cotton brought enormous wealth to Beaufort and the surrounding plantations. Beaufort was one of the wealthiest cities in the United States prior to the Civil War and was often considered to be the "Newport" of the South. Although Charleston and Columbia were the leading cities in the state, much economic and political influence was reared by Beaufort. Lowcountry planters in the city and the surrounding islands were among the most ardent supporters of state secession, first during the Nullification Crisis in the 1830s and then in the 1850s. At the eve of secession, Beaufort was arguably at its cultural, economic, and political zenith, with a population of about 4,000, excluding slaves. Like modern-day Beaufort, the city attracted many residents from beyond the state, with many Northerners and Europeans residing in town and operating successful businesses.

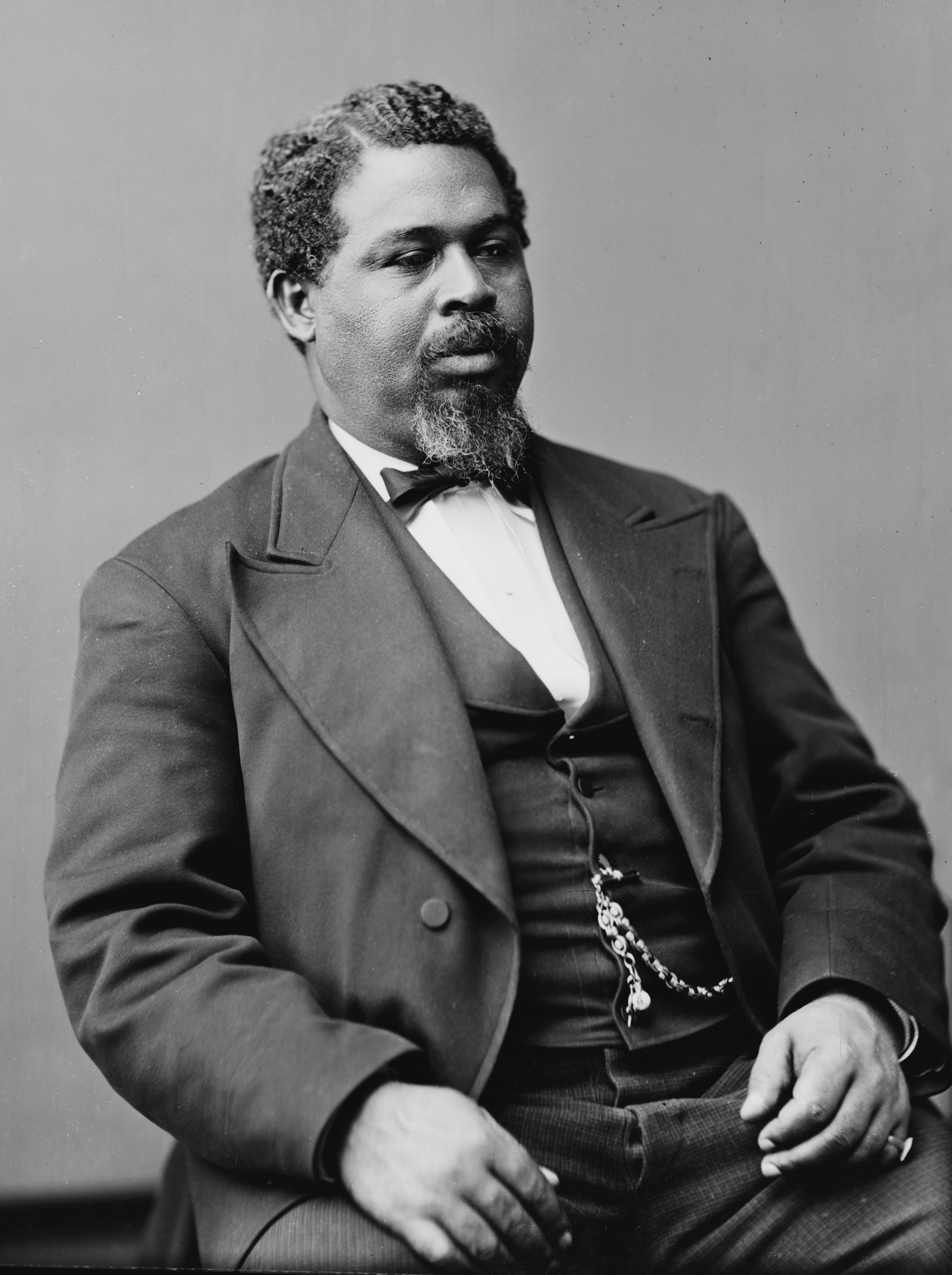
Native Beaufortonian Robert Smalls

== Civil War and Reconstruction: 1861–1893 ==
The Civil War had a dramatic effect on Beaufort, as an amphibious attack and subsequent occupation of the city in November 1861 made it one of the first communities in the Deep South to be held in Union hands. Though much of the town was spared from physical destruction, there were many incidents of arson and looting. In a historic effort that pre-dated American Reconstruction, the Port Royal Experiment provided a test case for the education of freedmen. In addition to educational advancements, the city made some political ones as well. Robert Smalls, a native son and leading figure in post-war Beaufort would later become one of South Carolina's first elected African Americans to the United States Congress and remained a prominent civic leader in the state and in Beaufort until his death in 1915. Due in part to the large African-American population and also Smalls's leading role, Beaufort remained one of the last outposts of Republican Party power in the Solid South.

Some of Beaufort's most prominent families returned to the area but never regained the enormous wealth that slave-based agriculture provided. Most of the original antebellum power brokers never returned to the area. As the influence of cotton declined, the lure of aqua phosphate mining increased. By 1890, Beaufort had regained some of its wealth and prosperity from that industry. It had also retained its position as county seat during that time, having previously lost it to railroad community of Coosawhatchie. However, a series of events would bring Beaufort into a steady economic decline for over half-century.

== Decline: 1893–1945 ==
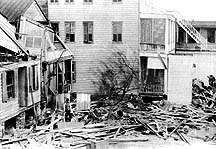
The 1893 Sea Islands Hurricane caused extensive structural damage

On August 27, 1893, a Category 3 hurricane slammed into the Lowcountry, killing over 2,000 area residents and causing immeasurable damage. Although only four individuals died in the city itself, Beaufort was heavily damaged and its phosphate industry was ruined. A fire that damaged much of the downtown area in 1907 continued to inflict economic and psychological harm to the city. A final blow to the area was gradual; the boll weevil decimated most of the cotton crop, which had for over a century been the major commodity of the community. By 1910, Beaufort had lost almost 40% of its population from ten years earlier. Though the city retained its political status as county seat, Beaufort became one of the poorest communities in the state through the 1940s. The growth of lettuce and tomato farming, in addition to shrimping, became the major facets of the economy during this time.

== Recovery: 1945 – present ==
Beaufort's economic recovery in the latter half of the 20th century can be contributed to three major influences: military investment, resort development, and downtown revitalization. Although Parris Island was continuously occupied after the Civil War, it retained a limited role in military affairs until 1917, when it was selected as a permanent home for the U.S. Marine Corps recruiting station. The onslaught of World War I, World War II and especially the Cold War brought new people and income to the area. A naval air station was established during World War II and transferred to the Marine Corps in the 1950s, thus cementing a major military legacy for the region. A U.S. Naval Hospital located in neighboring Port Royal was also constructed during the war.

New investment in the form of resort and lifestyle development on nearby Hilton Head Island and Fripp Island also contributed to the economy of Beaufort and the Lowcountry starting in the 1960s. Significant economic improvement came upon the completion of a downtown waterfront park in place of abandoned docks, championed by then-mayor Henry Chambers. The park (now named after Chambers) spurred the redevelopment and reinvestment of adjacent Bay Street and downtown Beaufort, propelling land values and commanding the attention of real estate investors, national media, and Hollywood. In recent years, renovations to the park, countless renovations to private homes and businesses, and several streetscape projects have continued to improve the overall quality of life in Beaufort.

Unlike most communities of its size in the south, Beaufort escaped much of the turbulence of the Civil Rights Movement. Jim Crow laws were gradually eased during the 1960s. Schools began the process of desegregation in 1964 and became fully integrated by 1970. Beaufort also elected its first African-American to city council (since 1910) in 1967. The city has experienced other demographic shifts, thanks in part to the city's military presence, its status as a retirement destination for residents from the northern United States and Canada, and a demand for migrant workers, primarily from Latin American nations and mostly for seasonal agriculture.

== See also ==
Places

- Beaufort, South Carolina
- Beaufort County, South Carolina
- Beaufort Historic District
- Parris Island

People

- Robert Smalls

Historic events

- Battle of Beaufort
- Treaty of Beaufort
- Battle of Port Royal
- Port Royal Experiment
- Sea Islands Hurricane
