= Tabby Manse =

Historic house in South Carolina, United States

- U.S. National Register of Historic Places
- U.S. National Historic Landmark District – Contributing property
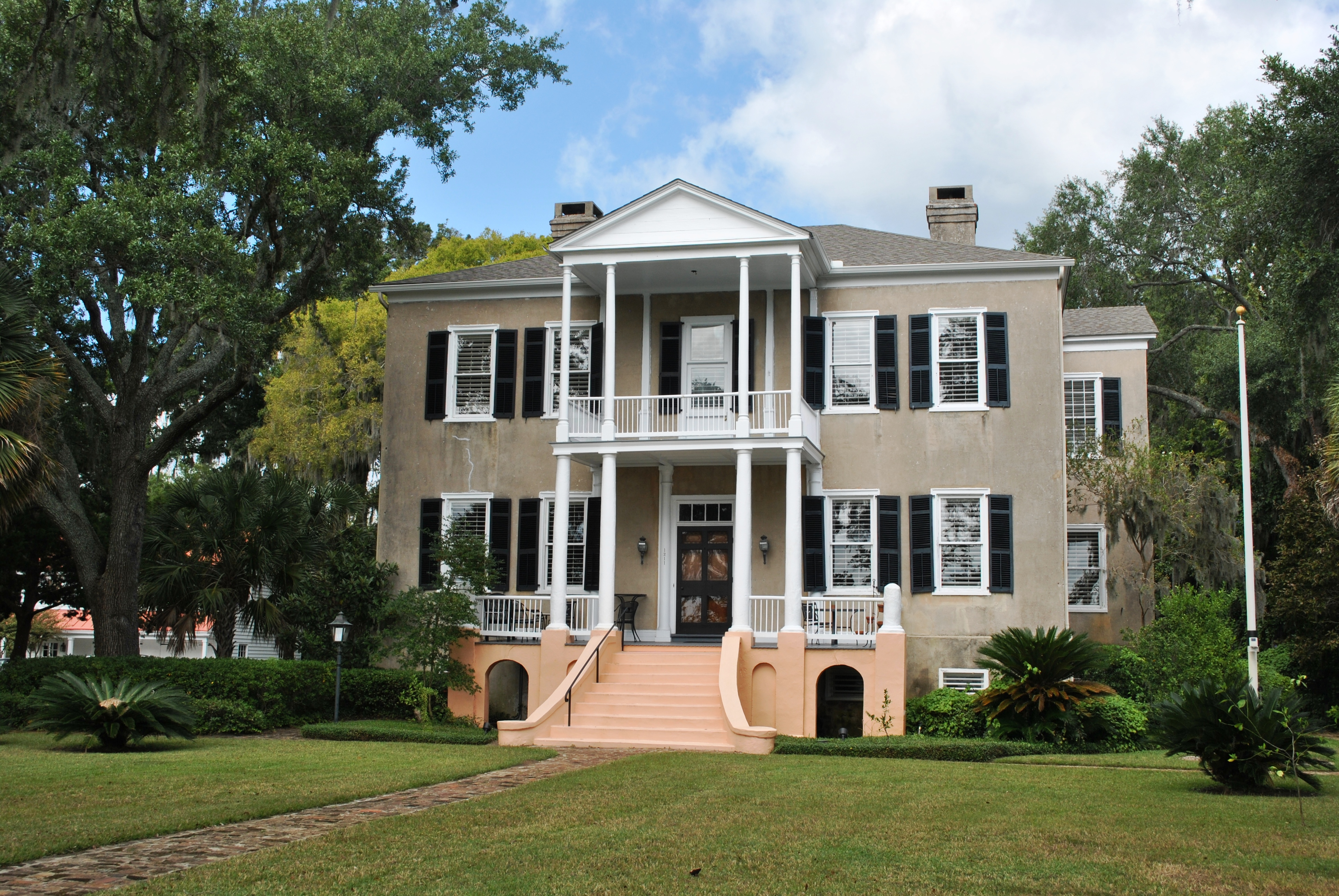
- Tabby Manse - Thomas Fuller House

- Location within South Carolina Location within the United States
- Location: 1211 Bay St., Beaufort, South Carolina
- Coordinates: 32°25′57.5″N 80°40′35.1″W
- Built: 1786
- Part of: Beaufort Historic District (ID69000159)
- NRHP reference No.: 71000745

Significant dates
- Added to NRHP: May 14, 1971
- Designated NHLDCP: November 7, 1973

Tabby Manse, also known as Thomas Fuller House, is a building in Beaufort, South Carolina.

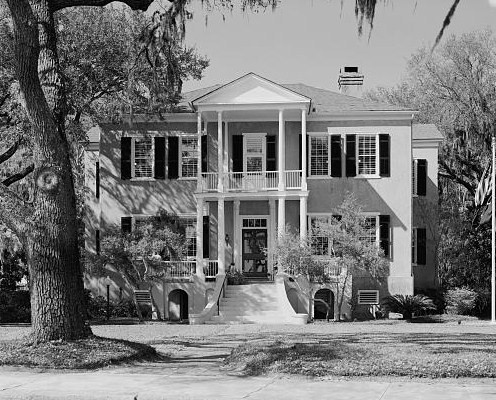
Tabby Manse

== Significance ==
The house is one of the few remaining early buildings on the South Carolina coast whose exterior walls are built of tabby, a material composed of whole oysters shells and lime from crushed oyster shells. The walls are more than two-feet thick and covered with stucco scored to look like stone blocks. It was built around 1786 by Thomas Fuller, a prominent local planter. Tabby Manse is noted for its classical proportions and superb construction. It is one of only a handful of remaining early American residences whose exterior walls are made entirely of tabby.

== History ==
Thomas Fuller, a rice and cotton planter built this house, first known as the Fuller mansion as a wedding gift to his bride, Elizabeth Middleton. Descended from Henry Woodward, the first English settler in South Carolina, Elizabeth was a member of three of the most prominent colonial South Carolina families—the Barnwells, the Bulls, and the Middletons. Her great-grandfather, John "Tuscarora Jack" Barnwell, subdued the Indians in the Carolinas, and her first cousin, Arthur Middleton, signed the United States Declaration of Independence.

Upon settling in Sheldon and Beaufort, Thomas Fuller made a fortune as a planter. He and Elizabeth reared their twelve children here, the most prominent being two Harvard-educated sons---Dr. Thomas Fuller, Jr., physician, and Dr. Richard Fuller, lawyer turned Baptist minister, who became a nationally famous preacher and spearheaded the founding of the Southern Baptist Convention.

The Federal occupation of Beaufort immediately following the Battle of Port Royal on November 7, 1861, early in the American Civil War, swept away the Fullers, their friends, and their way of life. In early 1862 the Reverend Mansfield French, a Methodist minister sponsored by the American Missionary Association, headed an expedition to Beaufort to care for abandoned slaves and occupied this house. When in 1864 the house was auctioned to pay Federal real estate taxes, French purchased it. Active in Republican politics, he sought unsuccessfully to become the first United States senator of the Reconstruction era from South Carolina. His son, Winchell, founded a Republican newspaper here, The Beaufort Tribune.

In the 1870s when Winchell went bankrupt and moved to Florida, the French family transferred title to Winchell's wife, Emmeline Morrill, a native of Quebec. Her sister, Almira Morrill Onthank, and Almira's nieces, Emma Onthank and Alma and Clara Greenwood, opened a guest house here, which they named Tabby Manse and operated for almost 100 years.

Francis Griswold wrote A Sea Island Lady while staying here in the 1930s, vividly describing the interior as the heart of the house he called Marshlands in his famous novel of the Civil War, patterned after Gone With the Wind by Margaret Mitchell.

In 1969 a Beaufort native, George Graham Trask, and his wife, Constance Claire Bowen, purchased Tabby Manse from the Greenwood heirs, marking only the third time in almost 200 years the house has changed hands from one family group to another. They restored the dwelling, added a modern kitchen, and created the gardens. Their children---Graham, Christian, and Claire---were the first to grow up here in more than a century.

== Architecture ==
Tabby Manse gathers its essential architectural features from the inspiration of Andrea Palladio, the 16th-century Vicentine architect of country villas, and from the style of English country houses. These twin influences also inspired Thomas Jefferson in his contemporaneous design of Monticello, the most famous Palladian-style house in America.

The floor plan of Tabby Manse is symmetrical, each room having its twin on the opposite side. The two drawing rooms on the first floor and the one upstairs, called the "ballroom", are paneled in native longleaf pine and cypress. Elegant mantels, contrasting with simple woodwork, are in the high style of the 18th-century English designer Robert Adam. Projecting rear wings give the back rooms direct southern exposure to waterfront views and fresh sea breezes. Except for the 20th-century kitchen addition, the structure remains unchanged from 1786.

== Recognition ==
Tabby Manse is individually listed in the Historic American Buildings Survey and the National Register of Historic Places. It was listed on the National Register of Historic Places in 1971. It is also a contributing property in the Beaufort Historic District, which is a National Historic Landmark.
