= Beaufort Historic District (Beaufort, South Carolina) =

Historic district in South Carolina, United States

- U.S. National Register of Historic Places
- U.S. National Historic Landmark District
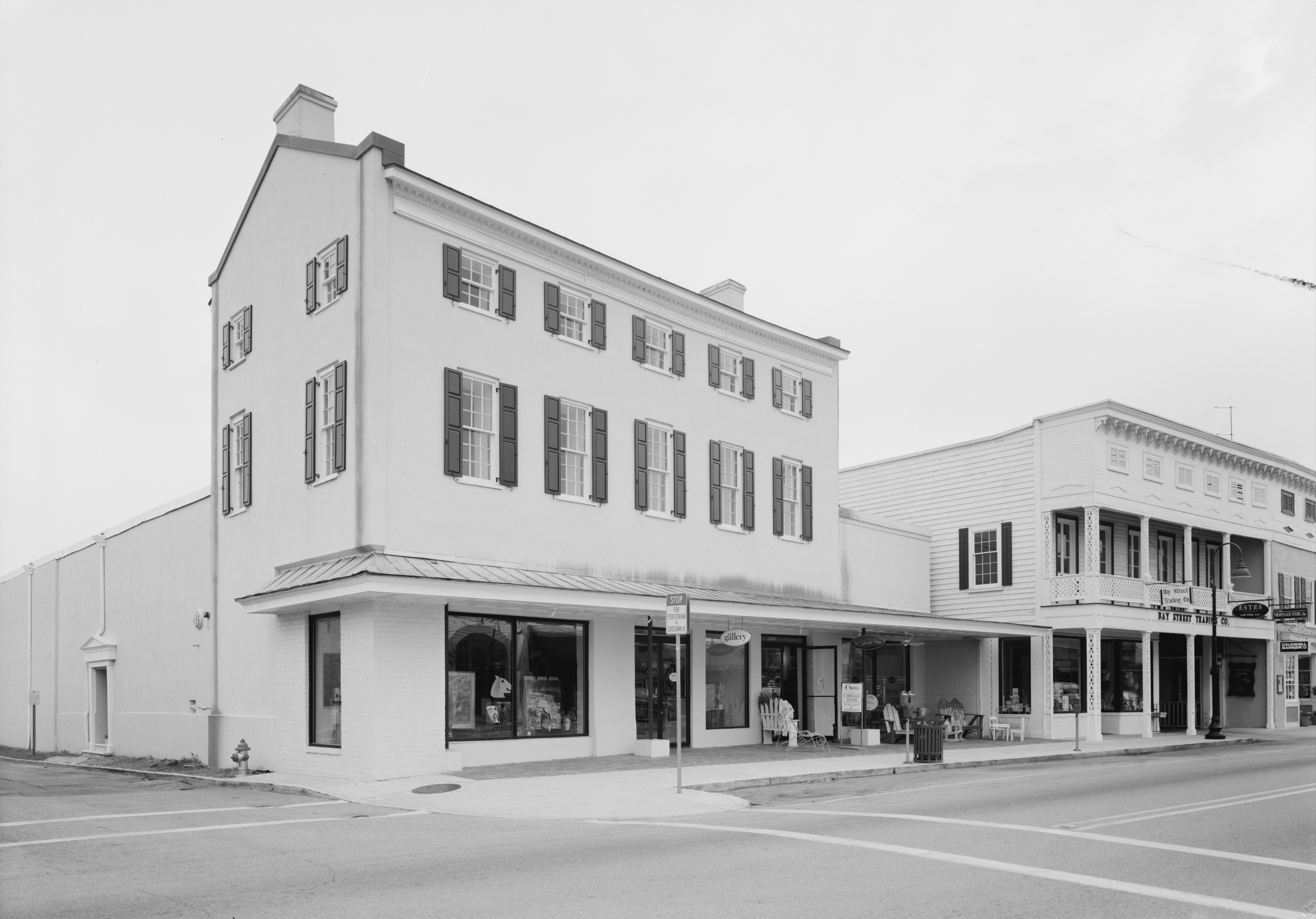
- Saltus-Habersham House, 802 Bay Street

- Location within South Carolina Location within the United States
- Location: Bounded by the Beaufort River, Bladen, Hamar, and Boundary Sts., Beaufort, South Carolina
- Coordinates: 32°26′8″N 80°40′4″W
- Area: 304 acres (123 ha)
- Built: 1521
- Architectural style: Federal, Greek Revival
- NRHP reference No.: 69000159

Significant dates
- Added to NRHP: December 17, 1969
- Designated NHLD: November 7, 1973

Beaufort Historic District is a historic district in Beaufort, South Carolina. It was listed on the National Register of Historic Places in 1969, and was declared a National Historic Landmark in 1973.

The historic district is renowned for its impressive collection of antebellum architecture that reflect the Federal, neoclassical, and Greek revival styles that were popular during the interwar period, along with the widespread use of tabby. A variety of homes, gardens, commercial buildings, houses of worship and graveyards are featured in the district, with some sites open for public inspection. Continuous efforts at rehabilitation and conservation underline the community's commitment to maintaining the historic nature of the district, which has attracted much acclaim and garnered popularity from visitors and media outlets.

The district's condition has been assessed several times since it was listed in 1969, and in 1998 the National Park Service proposed listing the district as "threatened" due to an ongoing gradual loss of historic integrity. Partly in reaction to this, the district's significance was broadened to include a distinctive historical element of post-Civil War history. The Port Royal Experiment, centered in Beaufort, involved a large-scale redistribution of land from large landowners to former African-American slaves in an effort to assimilate the freed slaves into a modern post-war society. This Reconstruction-era effort had a marked impact on Beaufort's built environment, and is still evident in the surviving buildings.

== Neighborhoods ==
The district can be further divided into five unique and distinct neighborhoods. For some purposes, the Northwest Quadrant neighborhood is not considered to be in the historic district, however it is often grouped in together with the other neighborhoods.

Downtown is centered along Bay Street, Beaufort's historic commercial street. It includes other nearby streets and is mainly commercial in character. Located between the Beaufort River and Bay Street is the newly renovated Henry Chambers Waterfront Park, which overlooks the Beaufort River and is home to many of the city's festivals and events. Most non-tourist commercial services have since relocated to other areas in the city, leaving mostly restaurants and shops that showcase various art, handicrafts, and antiques.

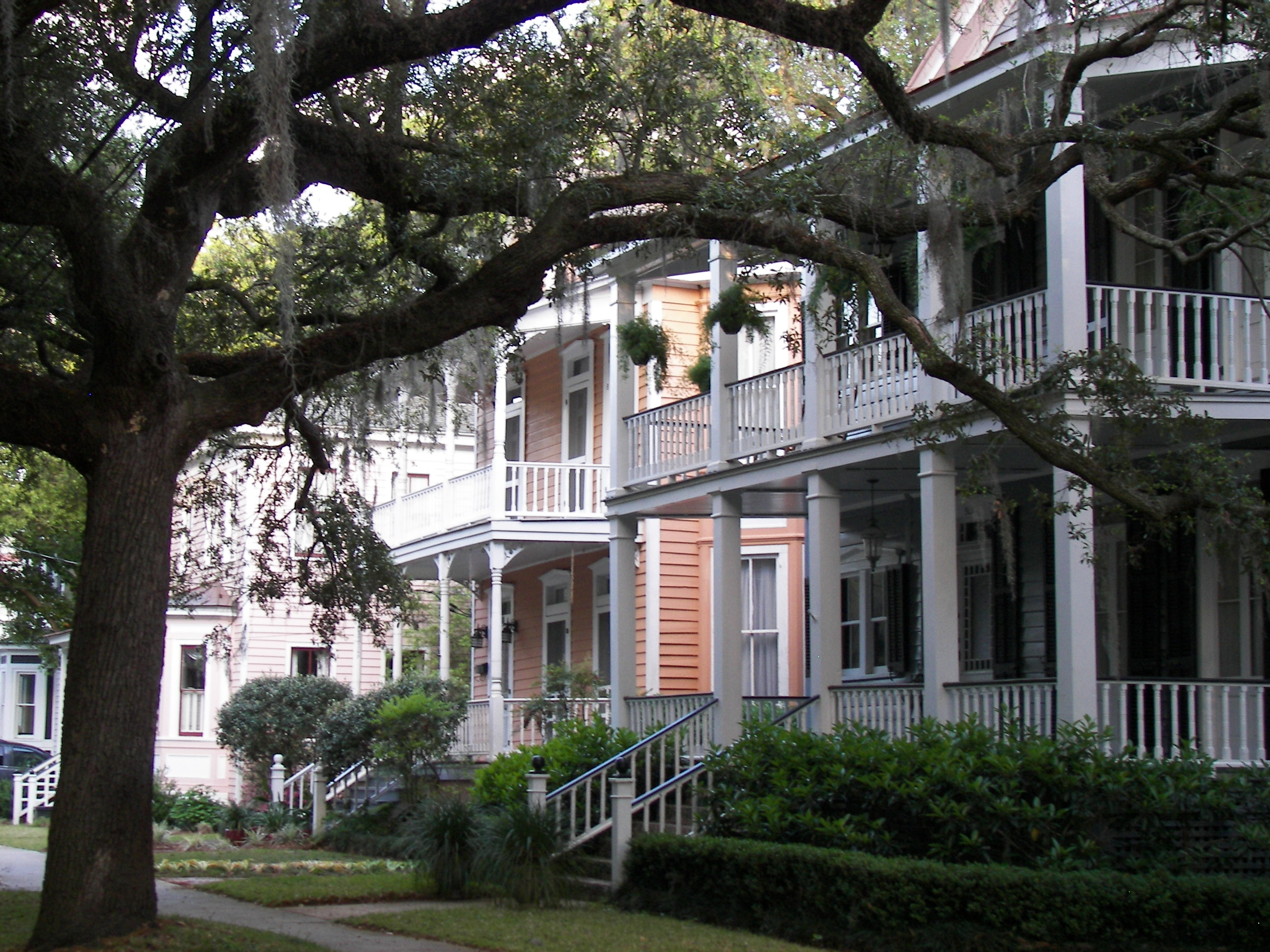
Homes in the Old Point neighborhood

The Point neighborhood (also known as the Old Point) is home to some of Beaufort's largest, oldest, and most expensive homes. Defined as the land between Carteret Street and the Beaufort River, this portion of downtown does not follow the major street grid and was once an area where a timber mill operated. Homes in this area range from the impressive mansions that overlook the Beaufort river to Victorian and Queen Anne style homes along Craven Street. Streetscapes are typically dominated by an impressive live oak canopy, often accompanied by Spanish moss. The Rhett House Inn is at 1009 Craven Street.

The Bluff area is located along Bay Street and North Street, immediately west of downtown. The large homes in the area are some of the most recognizable in the city, and have a scenic overlook of the Beaufort River. The art deco U.S. District Courthouse is located at the western end of the Bluff.

The Old Commons neighborhood (also known as the Northeast Quadrant) is located in the northeastern portion of Beaufort's original street grid, and is defined as the area among Carteret Street on the east, North Street on the south, Charles Street on the west, and Boundary Street to the north. Originally home to a hodgepodge of medium-sized homes, graveyards, and chapels, this section of downtown is undergoing reinvestment and redevelopment, yet retains a southern style of architecture. Nearly all homes in this neighborhood employ front or side porches.

The Northwest Quadrant neighborhood is loosely defined as the area between Charles Street on the east, Prince Street to the south, Ribaut Road on the west, and Boundary Street to the north. This area has for generations been the center of Beaufort's African-American community and is composed of late 19th and early 20th century homes, many in a shotgun architectural style. Bladen Street serves as the principal street through the community, and was recently renovated with improved landscaping and pedestrian access. There have been increased efforts at rehabilitation of several properties in the Quadrant, though significant financial and social obstacles often hinder these efforts.

== Historic sites ==
Several sites individually listed on the National Register are in Beaufort and are contributing properties in this district. These include:

- The Anchorage
- William Barnwell House
- Barnwell-Gough House
- John A. Cuthbert House
- Marshlands (NHL)
- Robert Smalls House (NHL)
- Tabby Manse
- John Mark Verdier House
- The Cobbler's Cottage

The William Johnson House and the Parish Church of St. Helena are contributing properties.

== Gallery ==
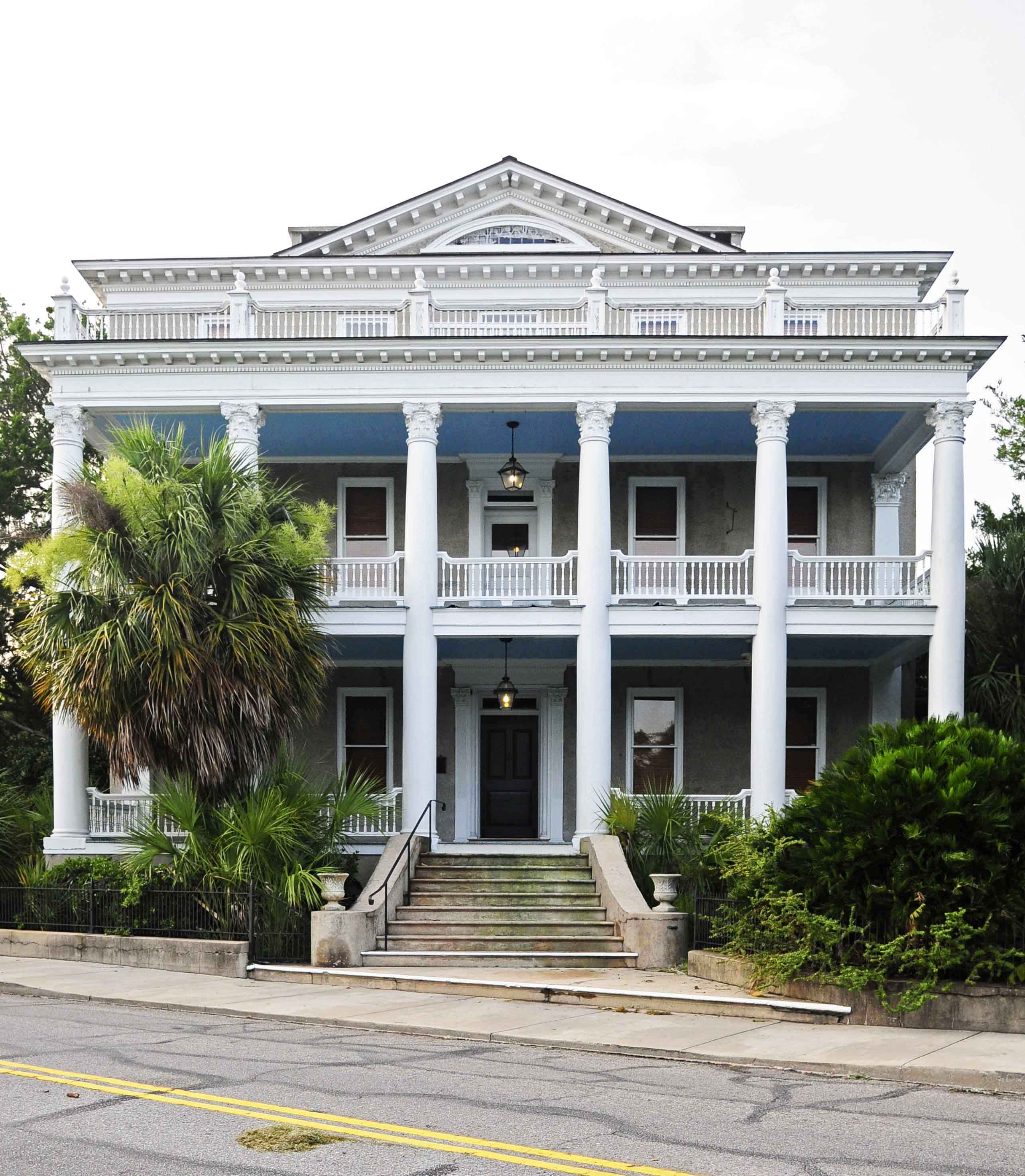
The Anchorage

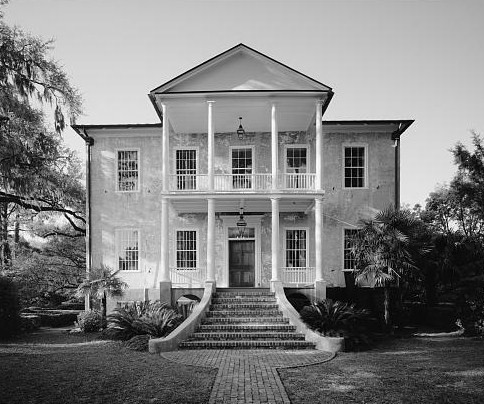
Barnwell-Gough House

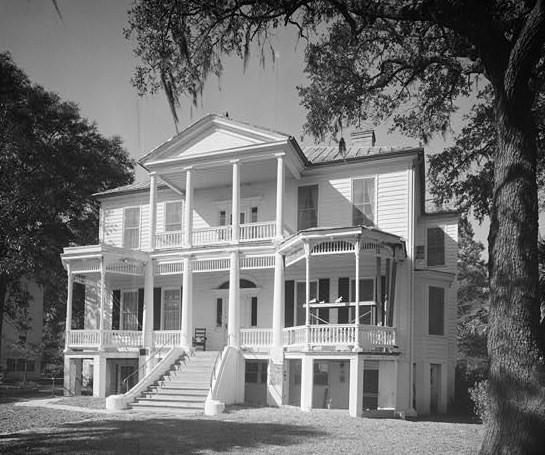
John A. Cuthbert House

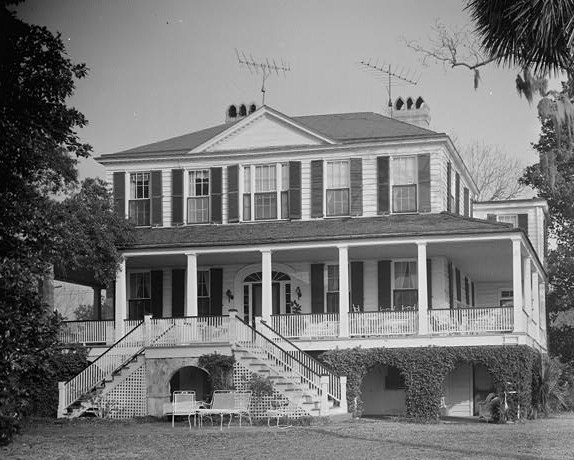
Marshlands

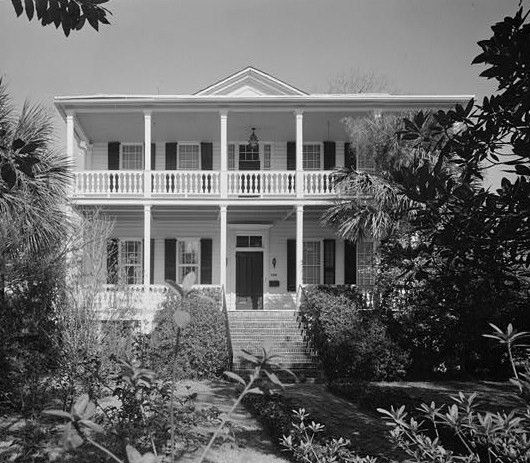
Robert Smalls House

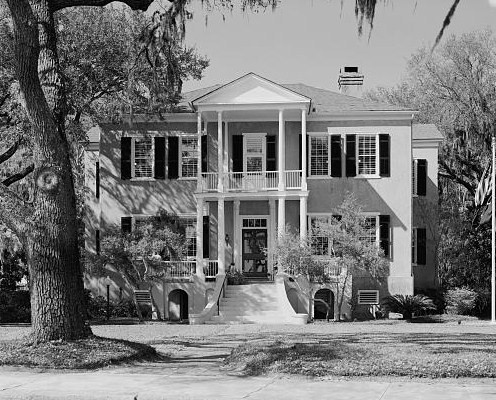
Tabby Manse

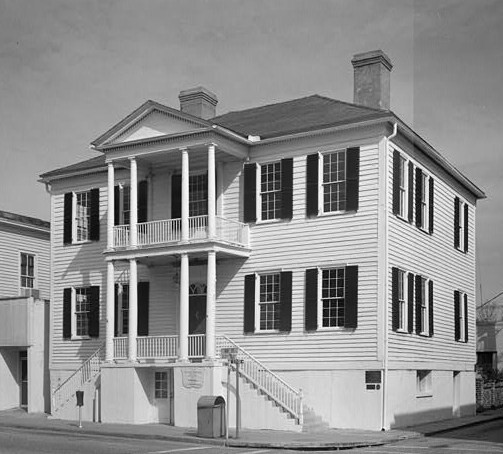
John Mark Verdier House

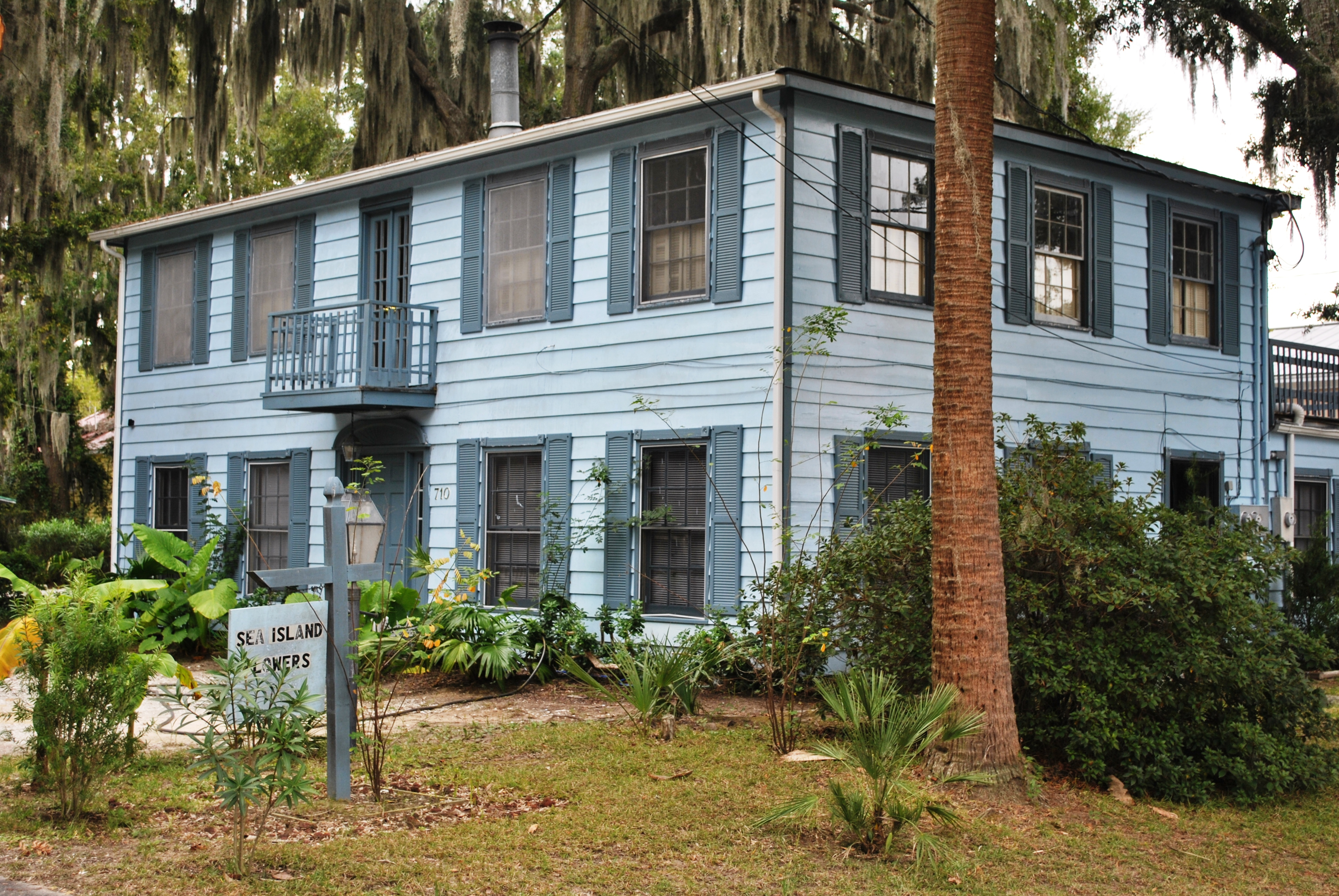
710 Prince Street

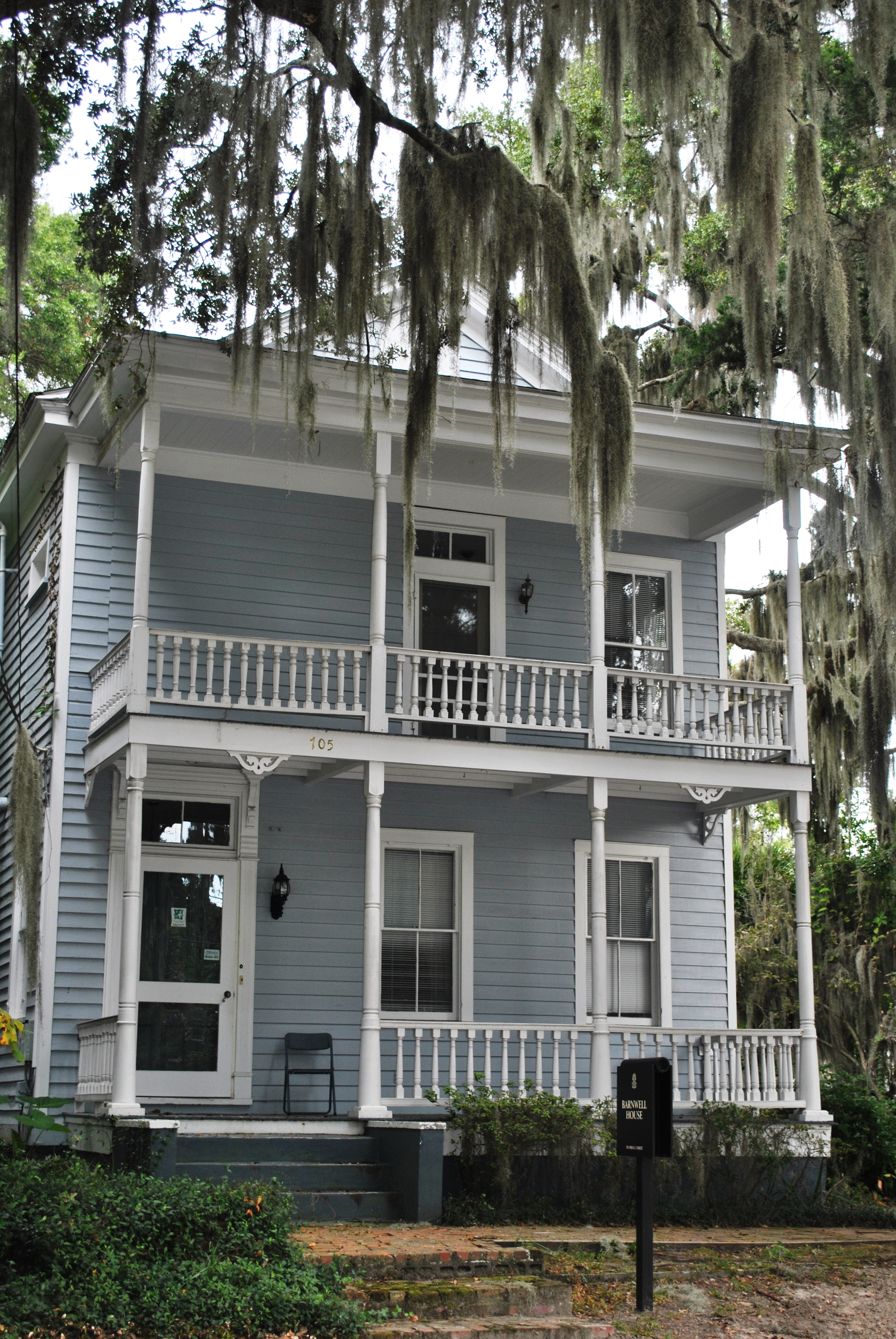
Barnwell House, 705 Prince Street

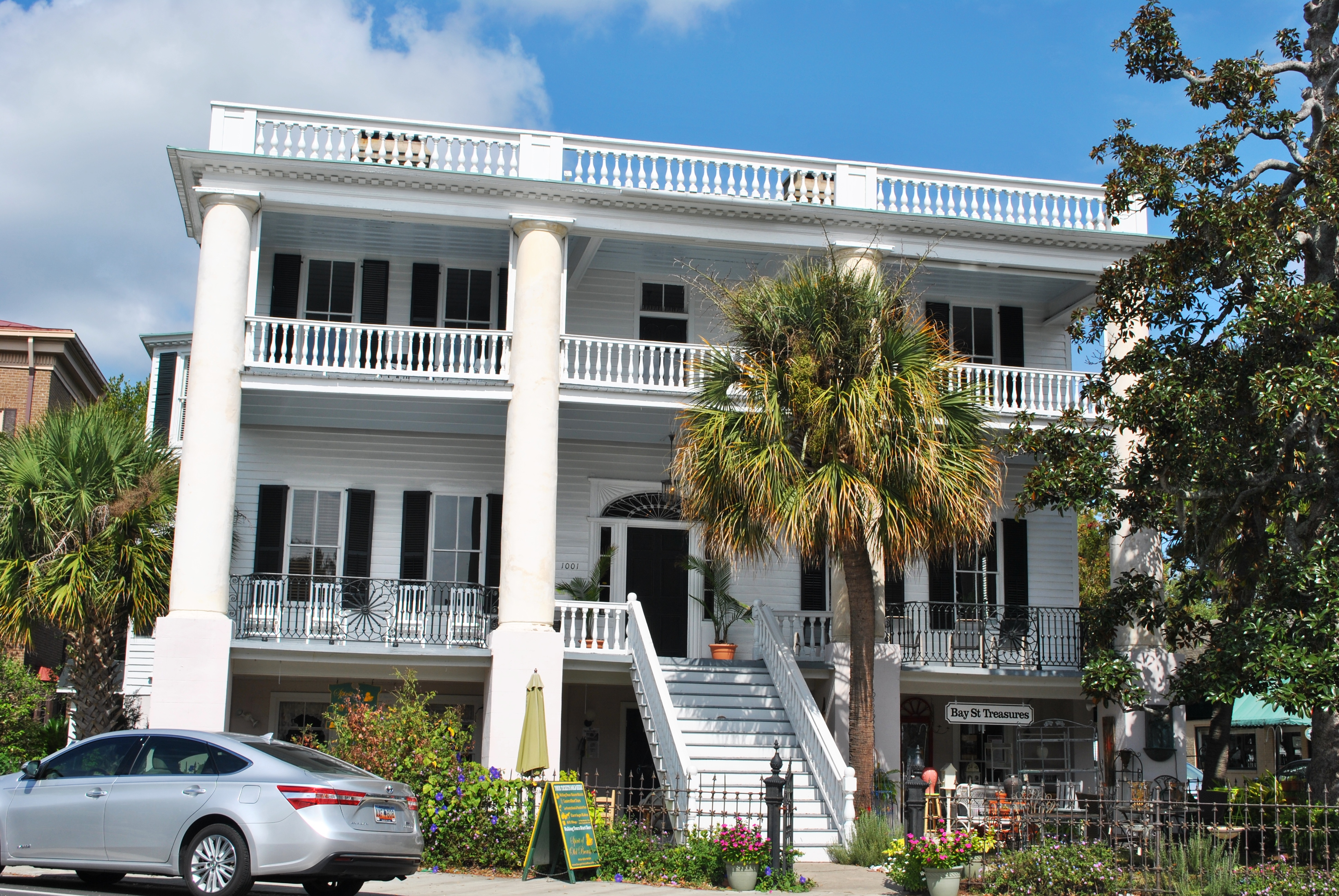
George Parsons Elliott House

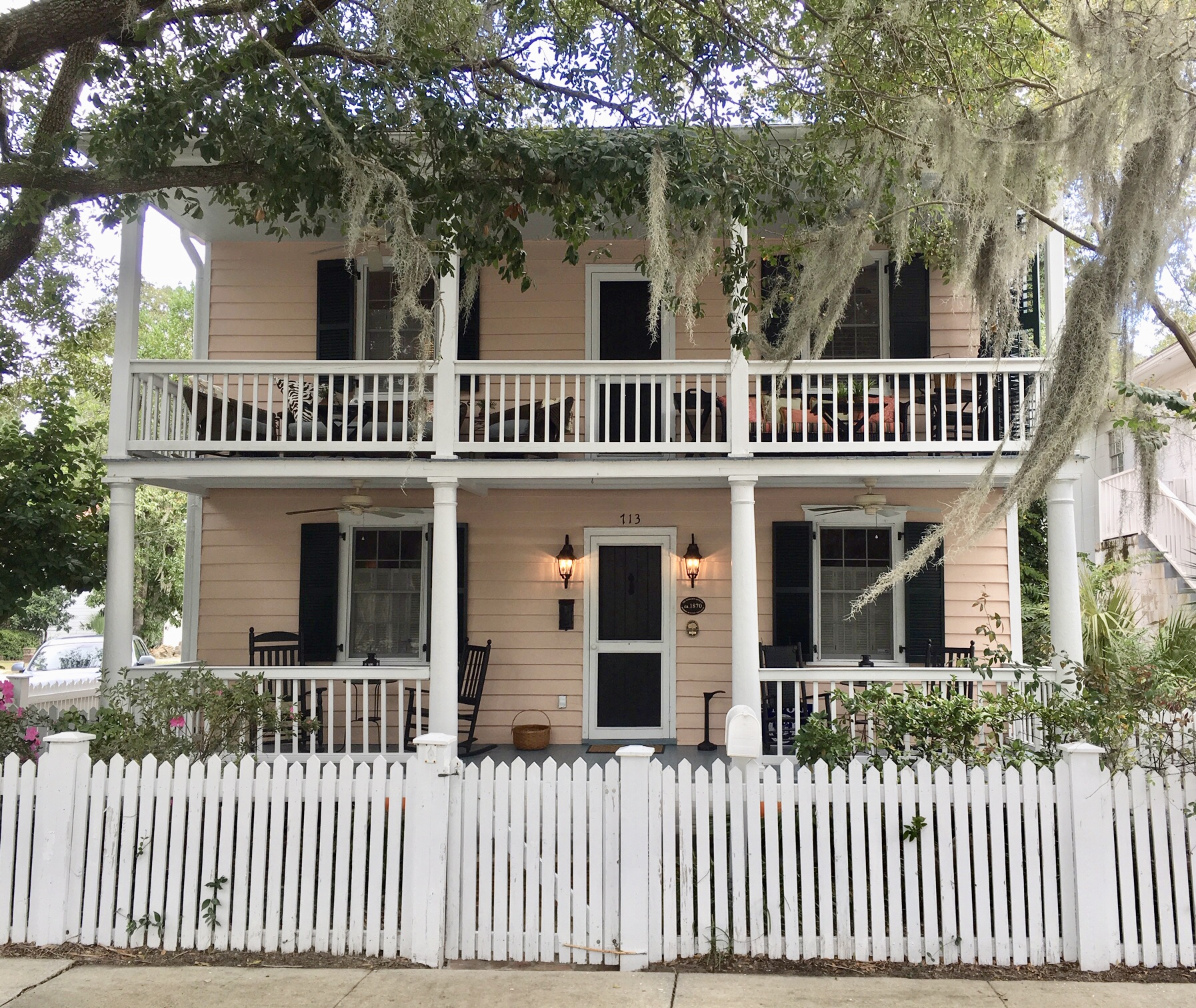
The Cobbler's Cottage

== See also ==
- History of Beaufort, South Carolina
- List of National Historic Landmarks in South Carolina
- National Register of Historic Places listings in Beaufort County, South Carolina
