= Robert Smalls House =

Historic house in Beaufort, South Carolina

- U.S. National Register of Historic Places
- U.S. National Historic Landmark
- U.S. National Historic Landmark District – Contributing property
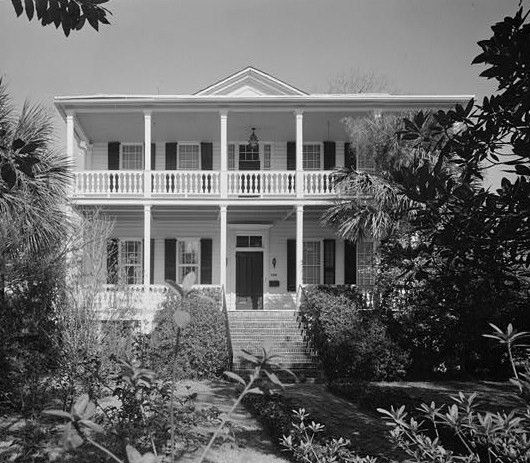
- HABS photo, c. 1980

- Location within South Carolina Location within the United States
- Location: 511 Prince St., Beaufort, South Carolina
- Coordinates: 32°26′7″N 80°40′6″W
- Built: 1839
- Part of: Beaufort Historic District (ID69000159)
- NRHP reference No.: 74001823

Significant dates
- Added to NRHP: May 30, 1974
- Designated NHL: May 30, 1974
- Designated NHLDCP: November 7, 1973

The Robert Smalls House is a historic house at 511 Prince Street in Beaufort, South Carolina. Built in 1843 and altered several times, the house was designated a National Historic Landmark in 1974 for its association with Robert Smalls (1839-1915). Smalls, born into slavery, achieved notice for commandeering the CSS Planter and sailing her to freedom during the American Civil War. After the war he represented South Carolina in the United States House of Representatives during Reconstruction.

== Description and history ==
The Robert Smalls House is located in central Beaufort, at the northeast corner of Prince and New Streets. It is a two-story wood-frame structure, with a side gable roof and a two-story porch extending across its (south-facing) front facade. A two-story ell extends to the rear, giving the house a basic T shape. The house was built in 1843, originally with a single-story porch and ell, which were expanded to two stories in 1850 and 1870.

Robert Smalls was born into slavery in 1839, and spent most of his early years in this house, where his master (and father) was Henry McKee (Son of John McKee). Around 1851 he was hired out by McKee to work in Charleston, where he worked on the docks, and eventually learned to sail. In 1862, during the American Civil War, he successfully commandeered the Planter, sailing her to the blockading Union fleet. He later served in the Union Navy, and became involved in South Carolina politics after the war. His bravery was made a key argument in favor of the Union Army's enlistment of African-American soldiers.

== See also ==
- List of National Historic Landmarks in South Carolina
- National Register of Historic Places listings in Beaufort County, South Carolina
