= John Mark Verdier House =

Historic house in South Carolina, United States

- U.S. National Register of Historic Places
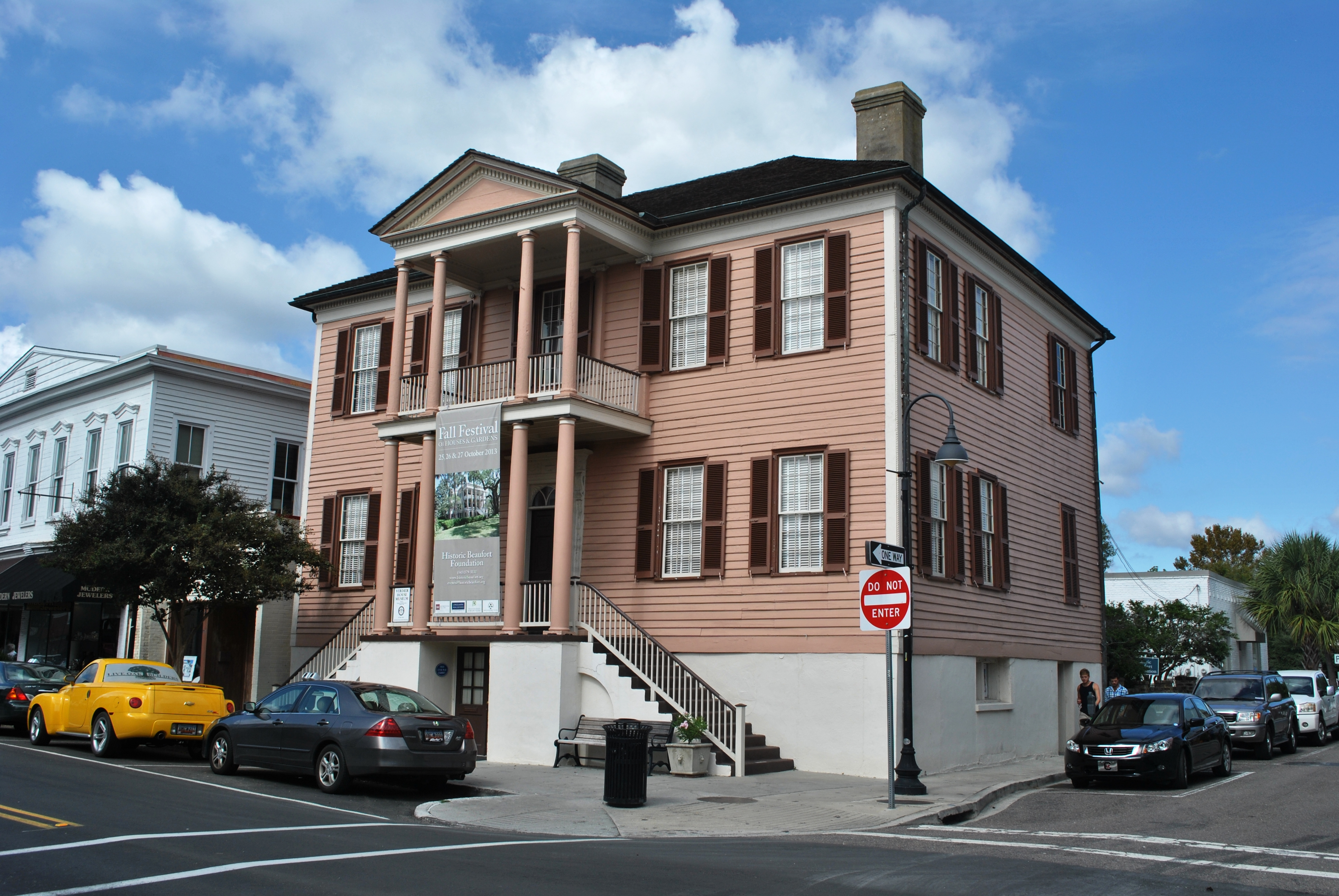
- John Mark Verdier House

- Location within South Carolina Location within the United States
- Location: 801 Bay St., Beaufort, South Carolina
- Coordinates: 32°25′50.3″N 80°40′15.6″W
- Area: 0.3 acres (0.12 ha)
- Built: 1795
- Architectural style: Federal
- NRHP reference No.: 71000746
- Added to NRHP: August 19, 1971

John Mark Verdier House, also known as Lafayette Building, is a building in Beaufort, South Carolina. It was built by John Mark Verdier, a French Huguenot, in 1804. The house typified Beaufort's gracious antebellum architectural style. It was a focal point of the town, a visible statement reflecting Verdier's significant wealth from trading indigo and growing sea island cotton.

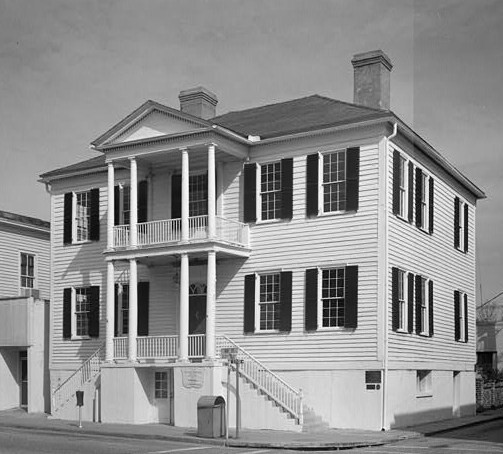
John Mark Verdier House

House approximately 1910s, showing signs for yarn shop and art school in basement, apartments for rent, history of Lafayette, and barbershop next door

It was listed on the National Register of Historic Places in 1971.

It is a contributing property in the Beaufort Historic District, which is a National Historic Landmark. It is the only house museum in Beaufort and provides tours Monday through Saturday from 10:00 to 4:00. Admission is $10.00 per person; children and military are free.

The house is owned and operated by the Historic Beaufort Foundation as a historic house museum.
