= The Cobbler's Cottage =

- U.S. National Register of Historic Places
- U.S. National Historic Landmark District – Contributing property
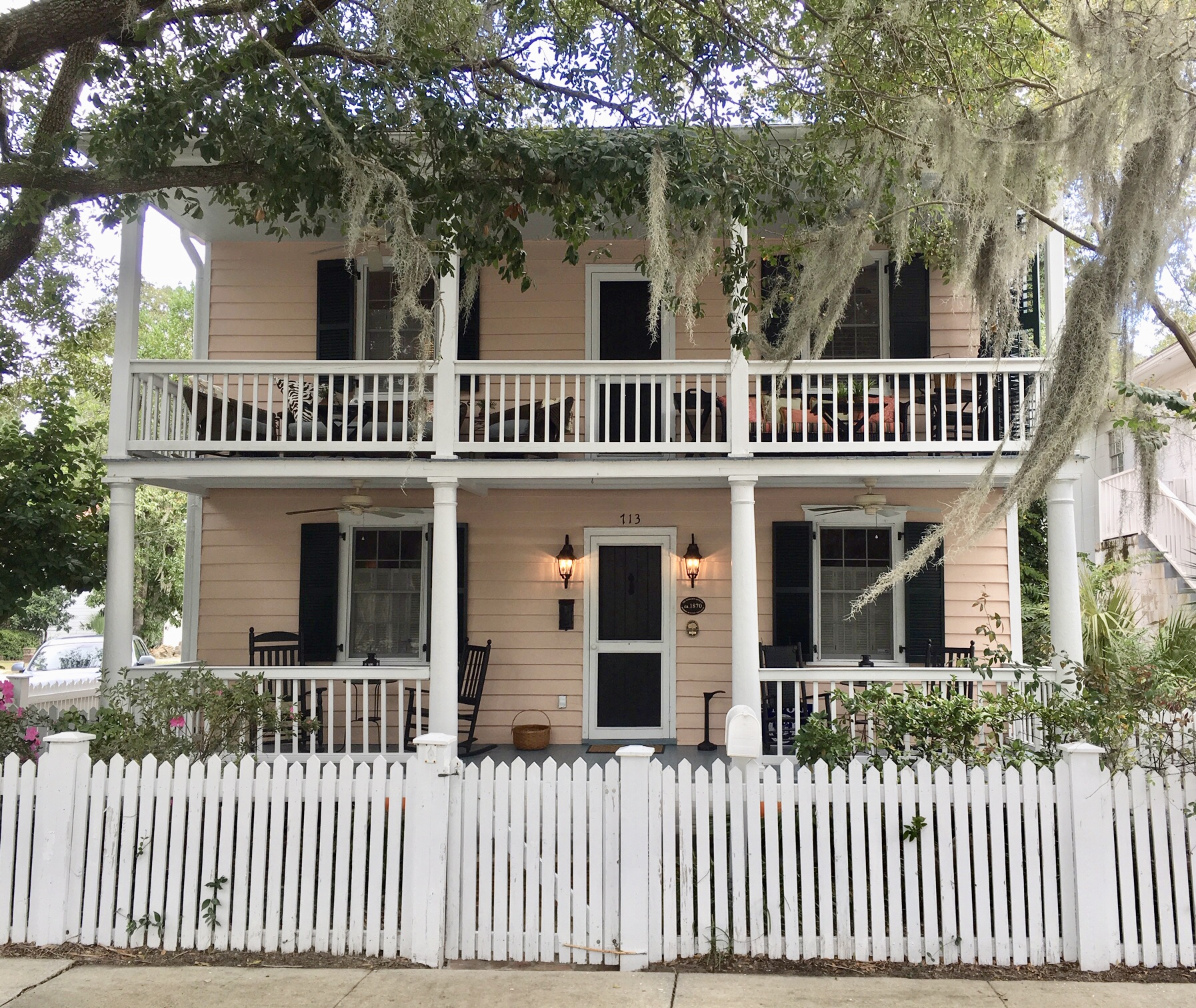
- The Cobbler's Cottage

- Location within South Carolina Location within the United States
- Location: 713 Charles St., Beaufort, South Carolina
- Coordinates: 32°26′9.48″N 80°40′21.87″W
- Built: ca 1870
- Architectural style: Cottage
- Part of: Beaufort Historic District (ID69000159)
- NRHP reference No.: 69000159

Significant dates
- Added to NRHP: December 17, 1969
- Designated NHLDCP: November 7, 1973

The Cobbler's Cottage is a ca-1870 historic cottage in the United States National Historic Landmark District – Beaufort Historic District. The Cobbler's Cottage is a contributing property of the Beaufort Historic District making the cottage a recognized member of the "National Register of Historic Places". The Cobbler's Cottage is located at Block 66, Lot C, 713 Charles Street, Beaufort, South Carolina.

== Description and history ==
Chartered in 1711, the city of Beaufort, South Carolina, was thoughtfully laid out along the bluff of the Beaufort River. Streets and blocks were designed to allow homes to face south, capturing the cooling southern breezes. Among the architectural hallmarks of the era were stately homes built in a distinctive T-shape known as Beaufort Style Architecture, specifically designed to take advantage of the river breezes.

Unlike these grand plantation homes, The Cobbler’s Cottage represents the modest dwellings of Beaufort’s working class—those who provided essential services to the wealthy planters. Located in the area historically known as The Old Commons, this cottage is a rare surviving example of early working-class housing.

Originally constructed as a “2 over 2” cottage, the home featured double-tiered front piazzas, wood clapboard siding, and a wooden shingle roof. Interior walls were crafted from plaster and horsehair, and the home was heated by four fireplaces connected to two chimneys. The exterior was painted a warm salmon hue known locally as “Beaufort Red,” reminiscent of the traditional paint used on Barbados Chattel Houses. Over time, the cottage was modified to include modern amenities such as a kitchen, bathrooms, a dining room, a modern roof and faux chimneys.

The cottage sits on Block 66, Lot C in the northwest corner of Beaufort. Before the Civil War, this lot was owned by planter Henrietta Seraphina Fripp Cunningham, who was estimated to be worth $4,000 at the time. During the war, the property was sold for taxes to Lt. Frank D. Saupp of the 55th Pennsylvania Volunteers. Mrs. Cunningham, along with her sons -Henry, Samuel, and John - and her brother Hamilton Fripp Jr., retreated to the family’s Belvedere Plantation (formerly Fripp Plantation) in Sheldon, SC. This estate was located on Scott’s Neck peninsula between Huspa Creek, Whale Branch, and the Pocotaligo River.

It was customary for planters to maintain elegant homes in Beaufort, and it appears the Cunninghams had similar intentions. Mrs. Cunningham owned Lot C, her brother owned adjacent Lot B, and Frederick Fraser—owner of the nearby Scott’s Neck Fraser Plantation - owned Lot A. Fraser had already built a stately home on Lot A before the Civil War. However, plans for a grand residence on Lot C were likely abandoned after the death of Mrs. Cunningham’s husband, Dr. Andrew McNair Cunningham, a shipper involved in the transatlantic slave trade, who died in Florida prior to the war.

The property earned the name The Cobbler’s Cottage due to the cobbler’s shop that operated on-site from 1899 until at least 1958. The shop was located in a separate structure on Charles Street, in front of the cottage. In 2014, the Historic Beaufort Foundation officially recognized and approved the name “The Cobbler’s Cottage” for 713 Charles Street. In 2017, the South Carolina Department of Archives and History approved the name based on extensive historical research. The home is part of the Historic Beaufort District, which was entered into the National Register of Historic Places on December 17, 1969, under the U.S. Department of the Interior’s National Historic Preservation Act of 1966.

Further documentation of the cottage and its associated buildings appears on the 1899 Sanborn Fire Insurance Map of Beaufort (Page 5), which details structures at the corner of Charles and Duke Streets (then listed as 418, 418½, and 420 Charles Street). These maps indicate building materials, heights, roof types, and usage—vital for assessing fire risk at the time. The maps show: • The Cobbler’s Cottage (418 Charles St): A two-story wooden dwelling, marked as “D”, with piazzas on both levels and a wooden shingle roof. A one-story tin-roofed addition was located at the rear. • The Cobbler’s Shop (420 Charles St): A one-story wooden structure with a tar paper roof, labeled “Cobbler.” • The Stable (418½ Charles St): A one-story wooden building with a tin roof, marked with a large “X” to denote its use as a stable.

These details provide a snapshot of Beaufort’s architectural history and the everyday lives of those who lived and worked in the town. The Cobbler’s Cottage is a testament to the lives of working-class families in 19th-century Beaufort.

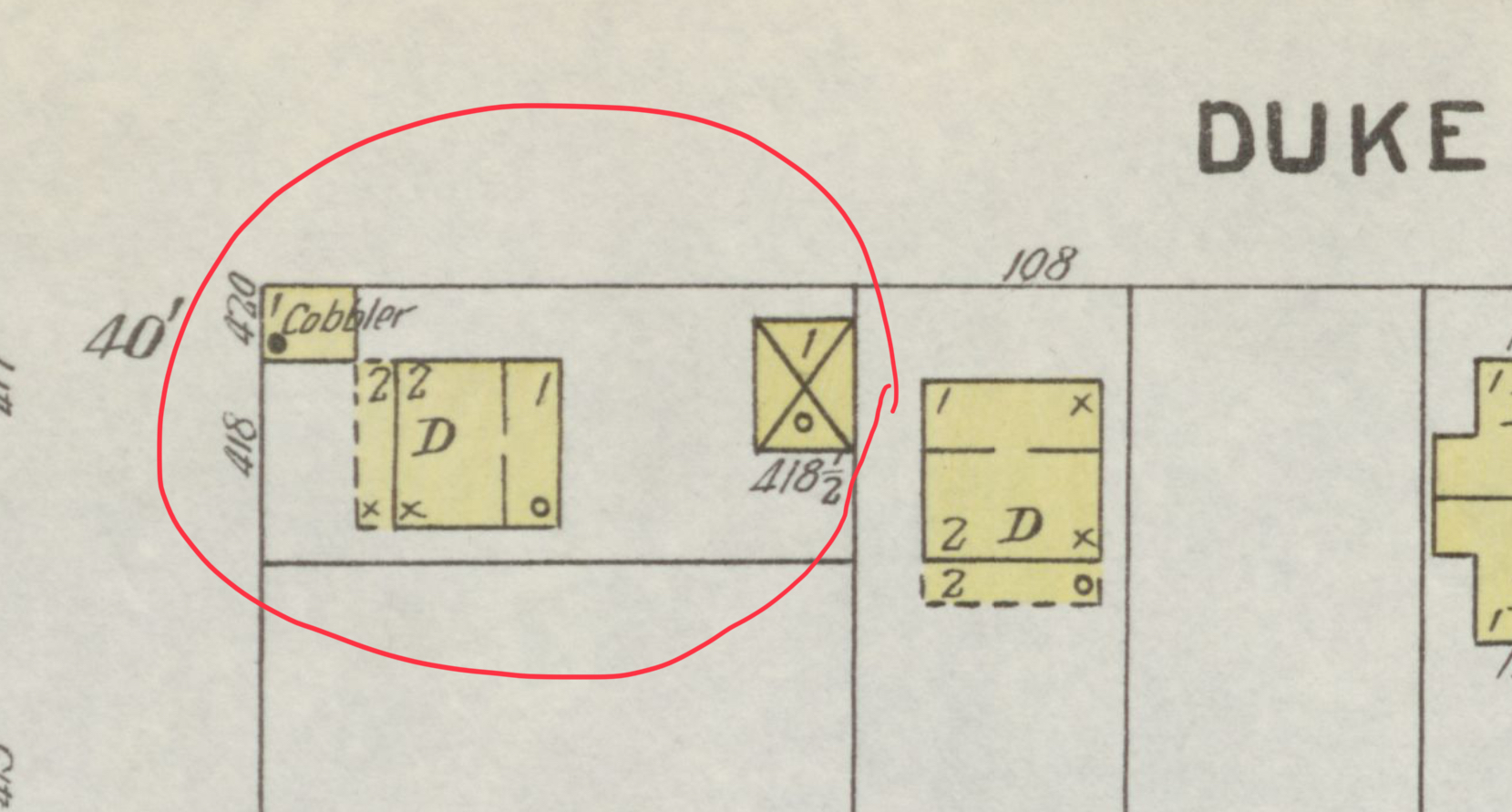
Cobbler's Shop in front of "The Cobbler's Cottage" on an insurance map, 1899

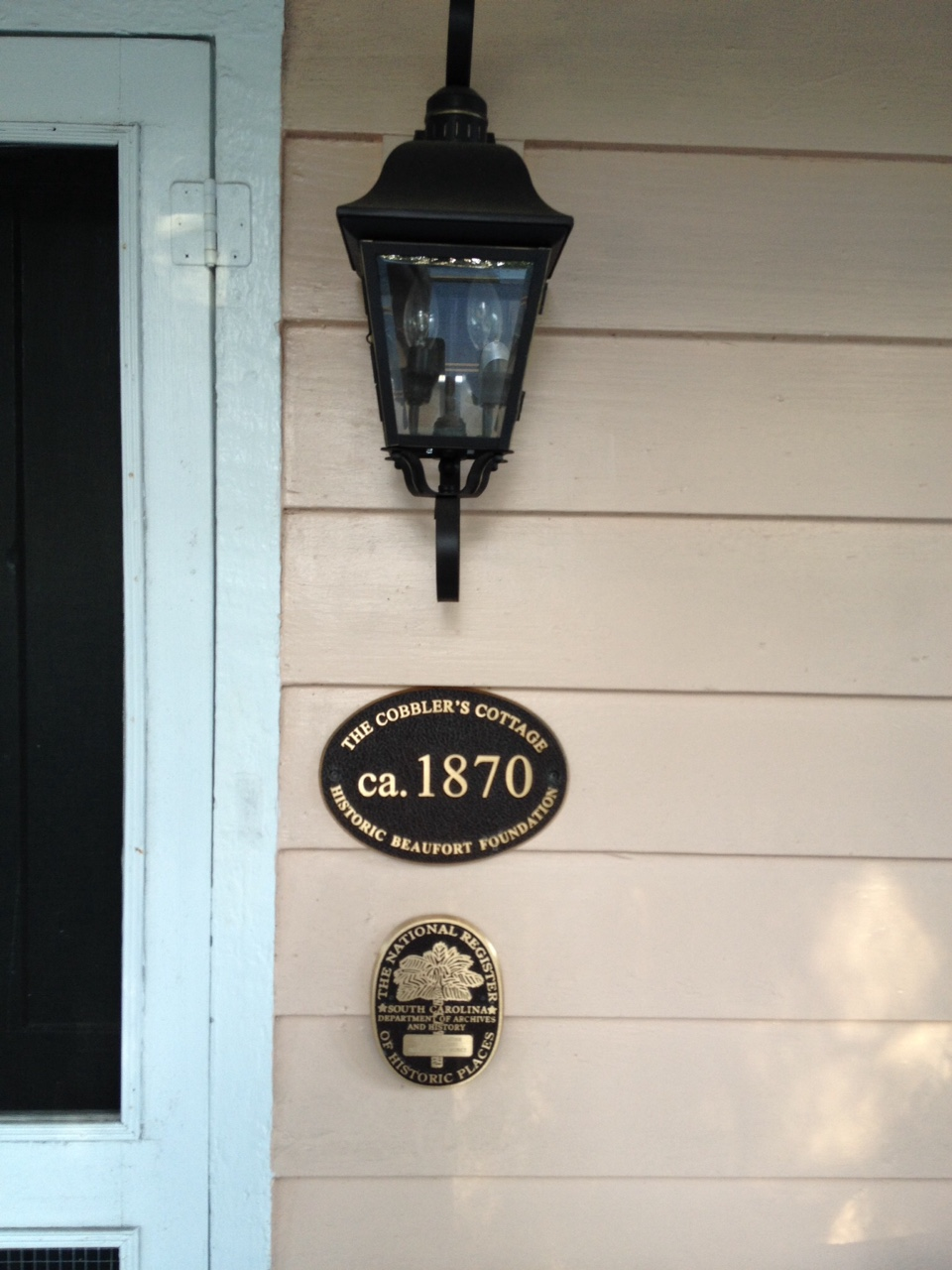
Historical plaques mounted by front door of The Cobbler's Cottage

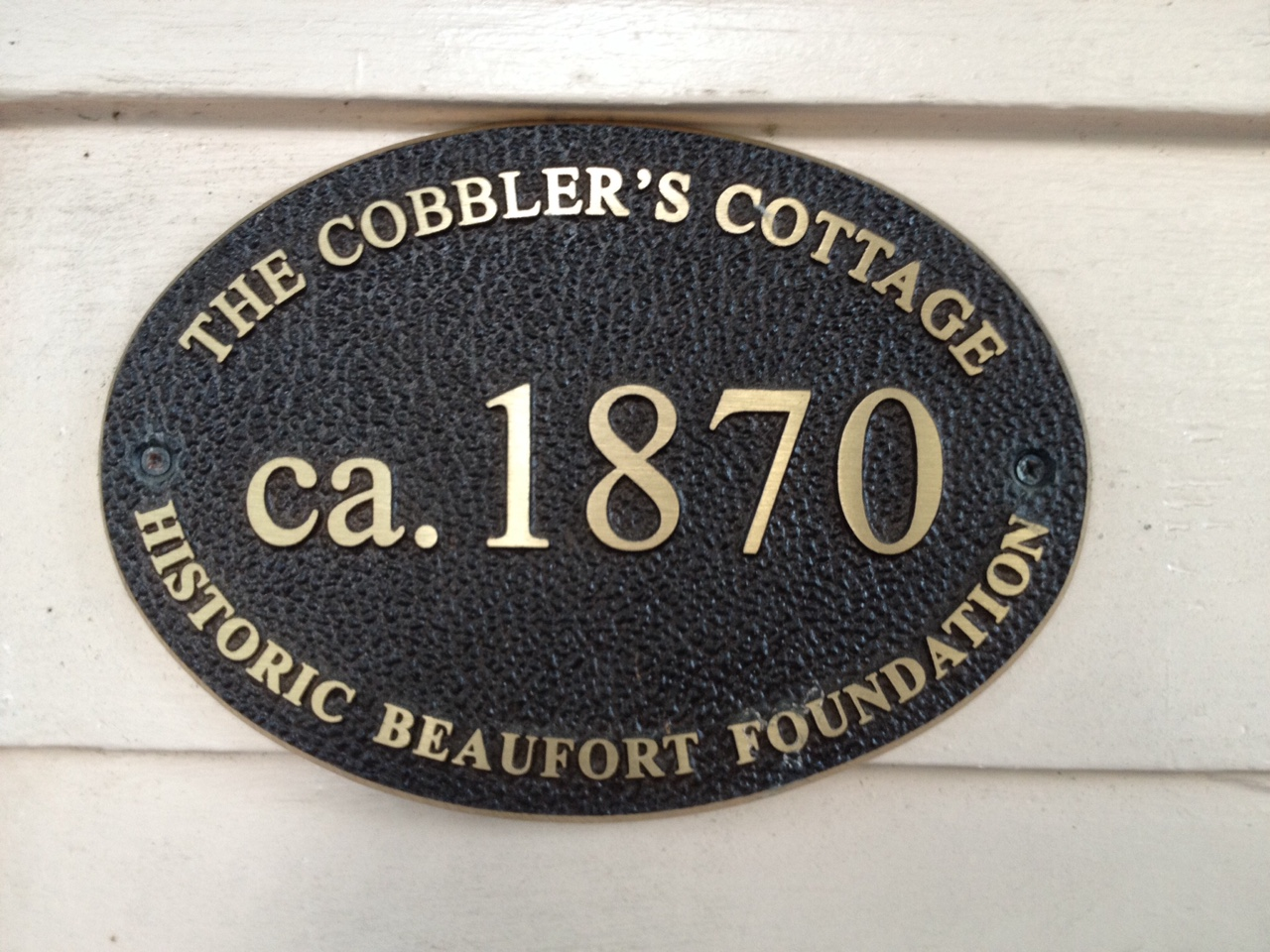
ca 1870 Historic Beaufort Foundation plaque for The Cobbler's Cottage

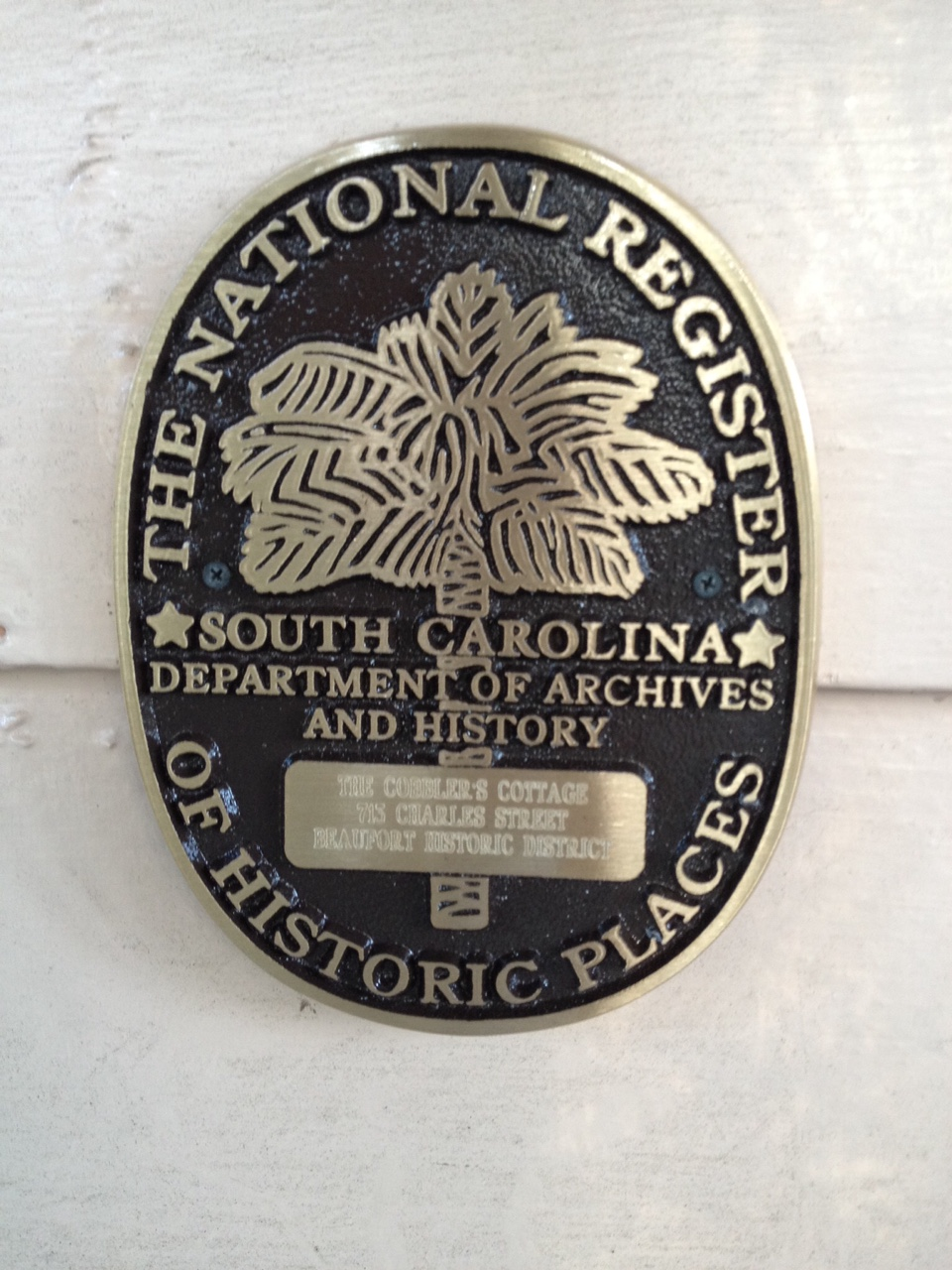
National Register of Historic Places plaque for The Cobbler's Cottage
