= William Barnwell House =

Historic house in South Carolina, United States

- U.S. National Register of Historic Places
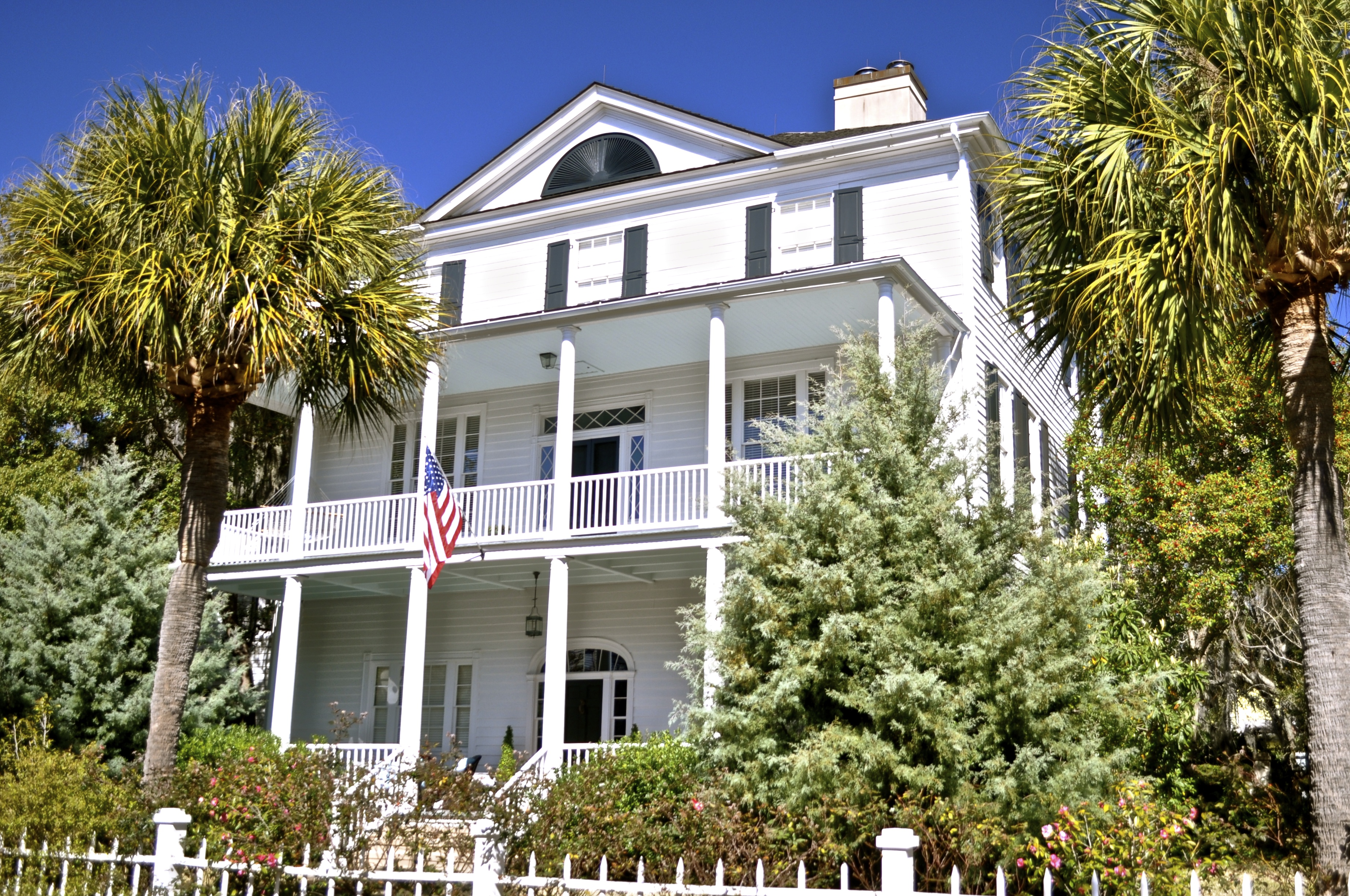

- Location within South Carolina Location within the United States
- Location: 800 Prince St., Beaufort, South Carolina
- Coordinates: 32°26′6.3″N 80°40′20.5″W
- Area: 4 acres (1.6 ha)
- Built: 1816
- Architect: Gibbes Bros.
- NRHP reference No.: 71000744
- Added to NRHP: March 24, 1971

William Barnwell House is a house in Beaufort, South Carolina. It may be included in the Beaufort Historic District, a National Historic Landmark.

It was individually listed on the National Register of Historic Places in 1971.
