= Barnwell-Gough House =

Historic house in South Carolina, United States

- U.S. National Register of Historic Places
- U.S. National Historic Landmark District – Contributing property
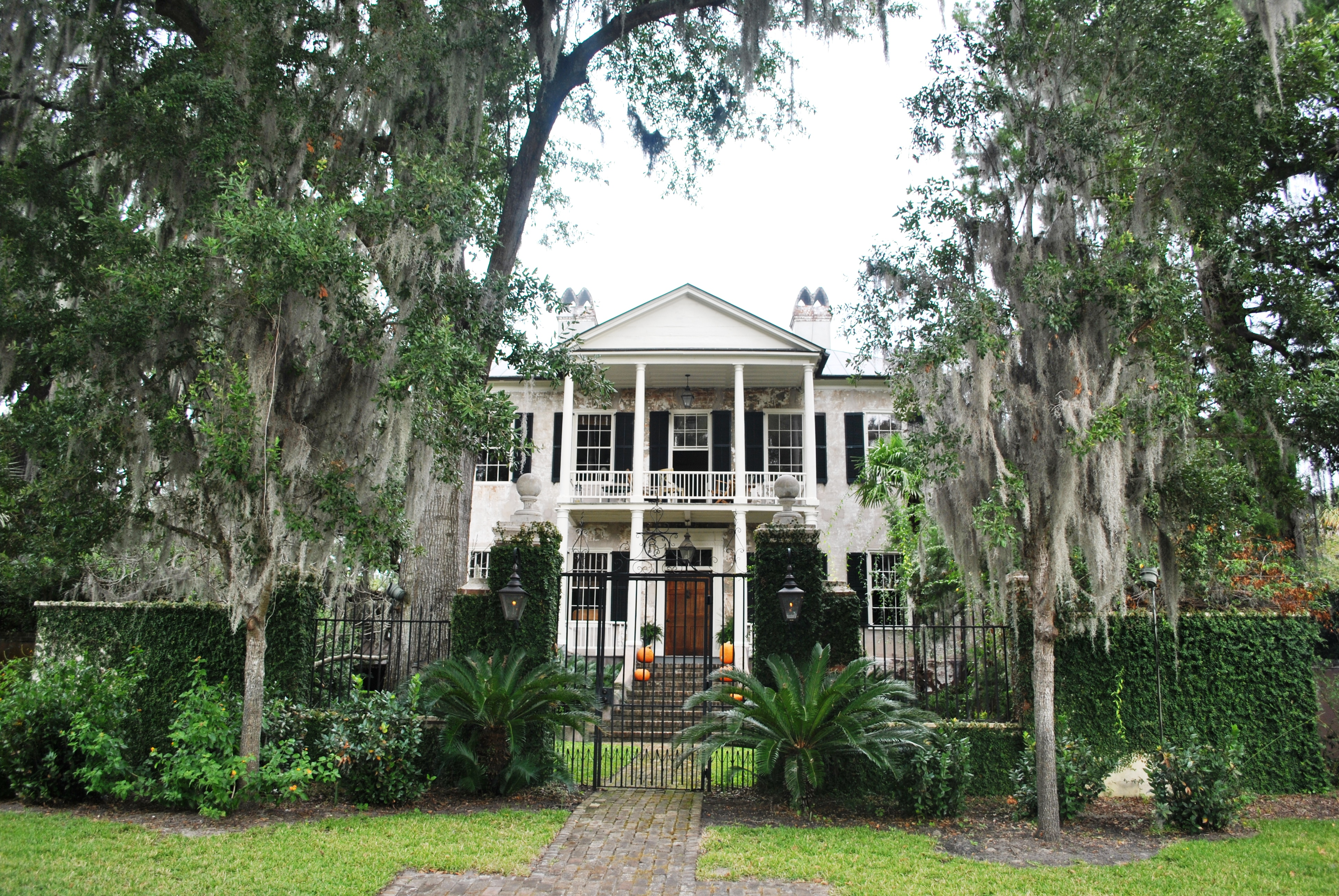
- Barnwell-Gough House

- Location within South Carolina Location within the United States
- Location: 705 Washington St., Beaufort, South Carolina
- Coordinates: 32°26′13″N 80°40′21″W
- Area: 9.9 acres (4.0 ha)
- Built: 1789
- Architectural style: Federal
- Part of: Beaufort Historic District (ID69000159)
- NRHP reference No.: 72001191

Significant dates
- Added to NRHP: November 15, 1972
- Designated NHLDCP: November 7, 1973

The Barnwell-Gough House, also known as Old Barnwell House, is a house built in Beaufort, South Carolina in 1789.

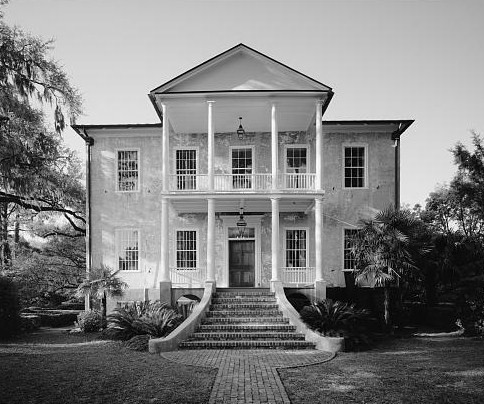
Barnwell-Gough House

It was listed on the National Register of Historic Places in 1972. It is included in Beaufort Historic District, which is a National Historic Landmark District.
