= Marshlands (Beaufort, South Carolina) =

Historic house in Beaufort, South Carolina

- Marshlands (Dr. James Robert Verdier House)
- U.S. National Register of Historic Places
- U.S. National Historic Landmark
- U.S. National Historic Landmark District – Contributing property
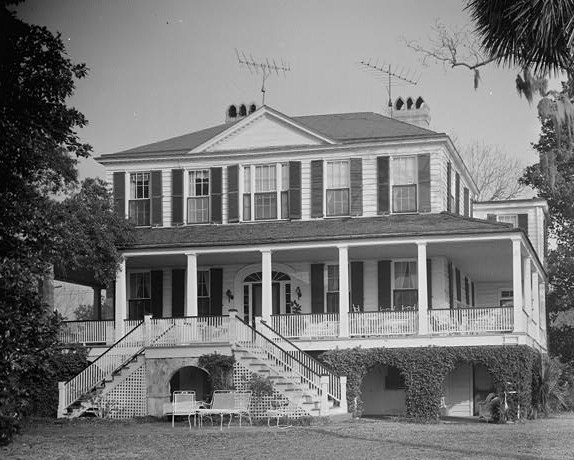
- James Robert Verdier House - Marshlands

- Location within South Carolina Location within the United States
- Location: 501 Pinckney St., Beaufort, South Carolina
- Coordinates: 32°25′59.4″N 80°39′56″W
- Built: 1814
- Architectural style: Federal
- Part of: Beaufort Historic District (ID69000159)
- NRHP reference No.: 73001674

Significant dates
- Added to NRHP: November 7, 1973
- Designated NHL: November 7, 1973
- Designated NHLDCP: November 7, 1973

Marshlands, also known as the James Robert Verdier House, is a historic house at 501 Pinckney Street in Beaufort, South Carolina. Built about 1814, it is a high quality and well-preserved example of early Beaufort architecture, showing both Adamesque and West Indian stylistic influences. It is also notable as a home of Dr. James Robert Verdier, who discovered a treatment for yellow fever. It was designated a National Historic Landmark in 1973 for its architectural significance.

== Description and history ==
Marshlands is located in Beaufort's historic downtown, on a parcel east of the junction of Pinckney and Federal Streets, overlooking the Beaufort River. It is a two-story wood-frame structure, set on a tall foundation of pink tabby cement with an arcade of arches. It is topped by a hip roof and its exterior is sheathed in wooden clapboards. A single-story porch extends around three sides of the house, supported by square columns. The main entrance is framed by sidelight windows and topped by a fanlight. The interior retains high quality original Adamesque woodwork.

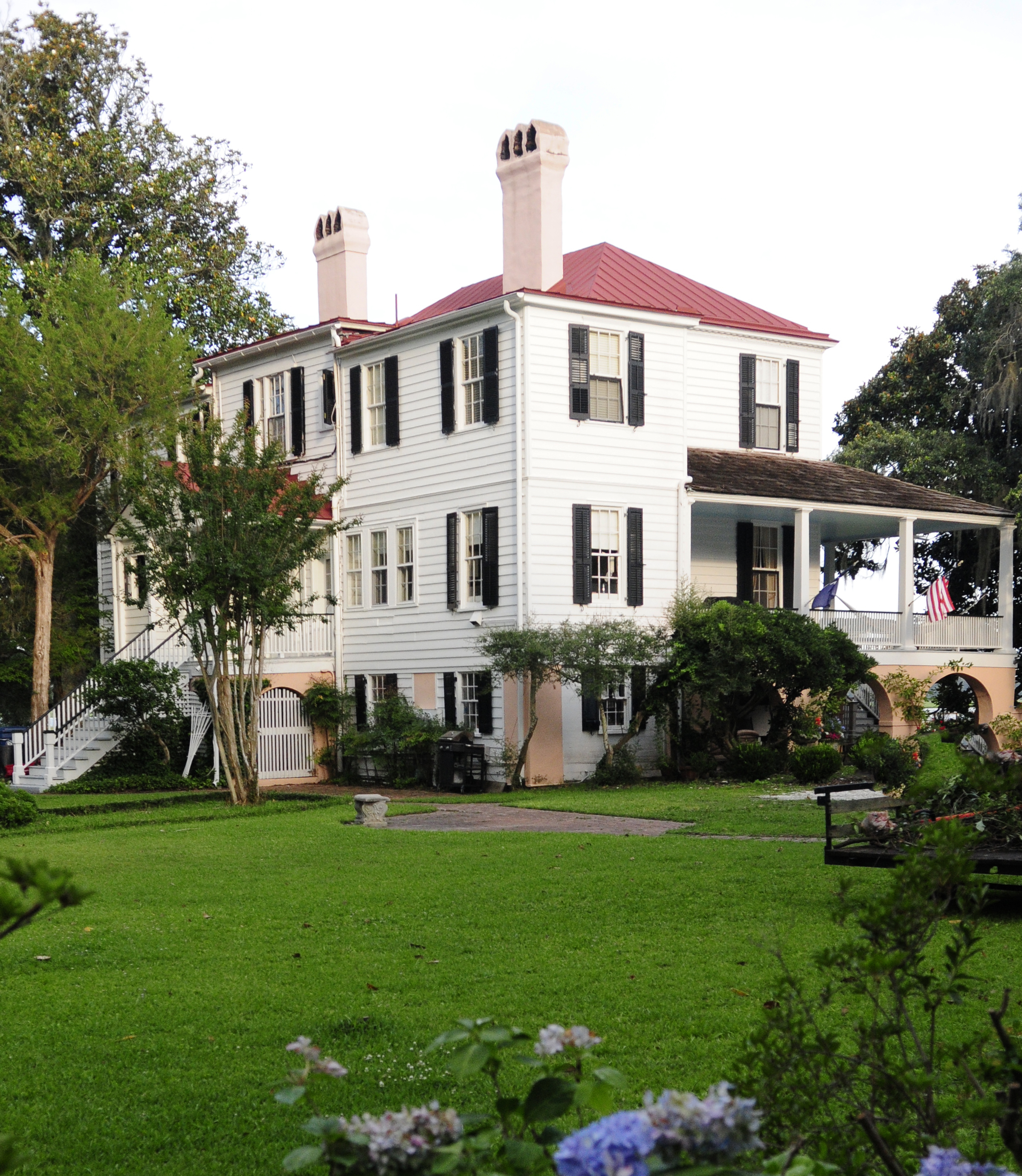
Marshlands

The house was built about 1814 for Dr. James Robert Verdier, and is noted among Beaufort's houses for its distinctive blend of Adam style elements with those from the West Indies, the latter including the arcaded basement and the single-story porch (when typical Beaufort houses have two-story porches). Dr. Verdier was noted for discovering early treatments for yellow fever; his house was used during the American Civil War as the headquarters for the United States Sanitary Commission. The house is privately owned, and is not open to the public.

== See also ==
- List of National Historic Landmarks in South Carolina
- National Register of Historic Places listings in Beaufort County, South Carolina
