= The Anchorage (Beaufort, South Carolina) =

Historic house in South Carolina, United States

- U.S. National Register of Historic Places
- U.S. National Historic Landmark District – Contributing property
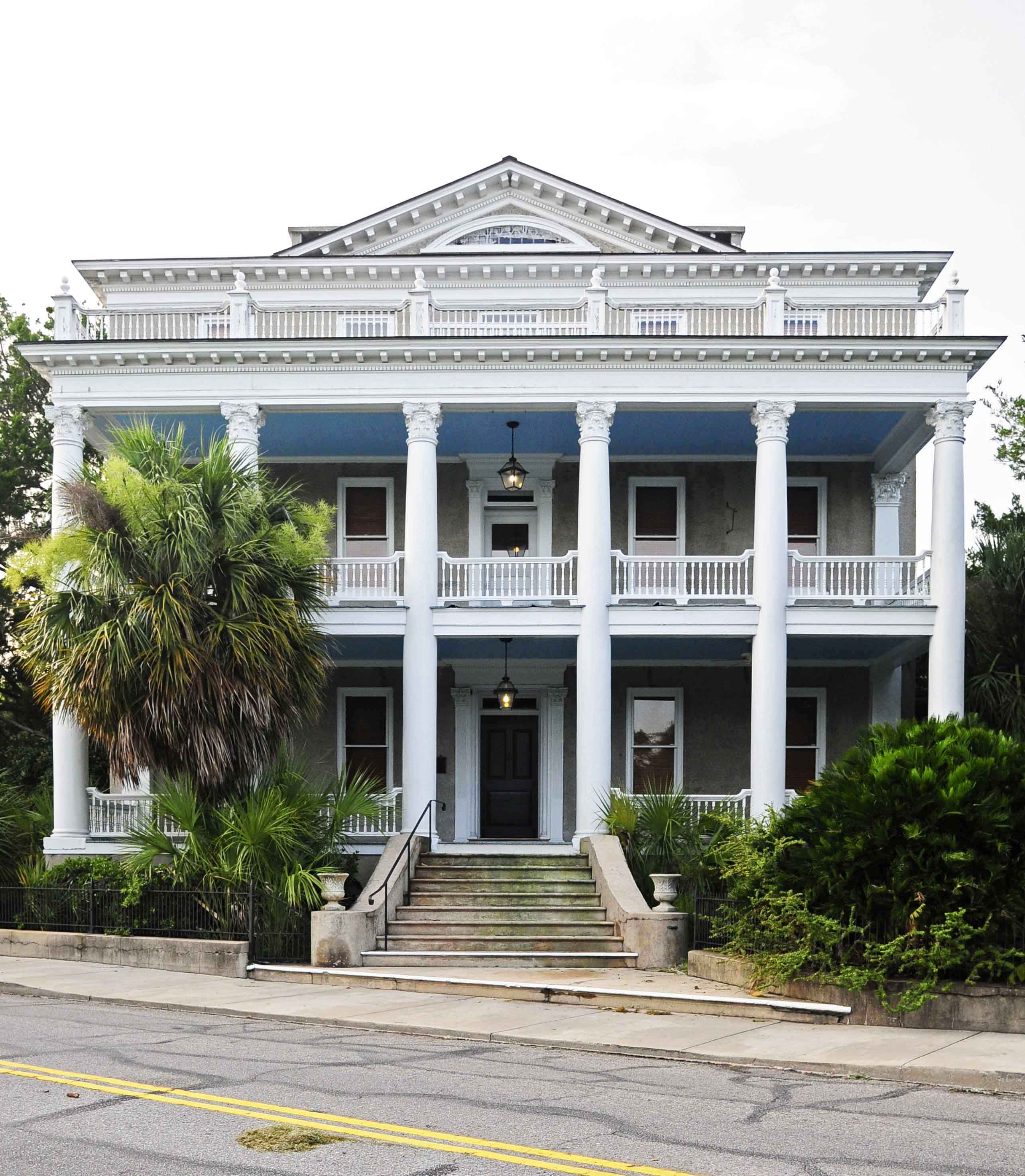

- Location within South Carolina Location within the United States
- Location: 1103 Bay St., Beaufort, South Carolina
- Coordinates: 32°25′55.6″N 80°40′27.5″W
- Area: 0.3 acres (0.12 ha)
- Built: 1776
- Part of: Beaufort Historic District (ID69000159)
- NRHP reference No.: 71000743

Significant dates
- Added to NRHP: November 23, 1971
- Designated NHLDCP: November 7, 1973

The Anchorage, also known as William Elliott House, in Beaufort, South Carolina, is a house built in 1776. It was listed on the National Register of Historic Places in 1971.

It is included in the Beaufort Historic District, which is a National Historic Landmark District.

In 2014 the house was purchased by Frank and Amy Lesesne.
