= John A. Cuthbert House =

Historic house in South Carolina, United States

- U.S. National Register of Historic Places
- U.S. National Historic Landmark District – Contributing property
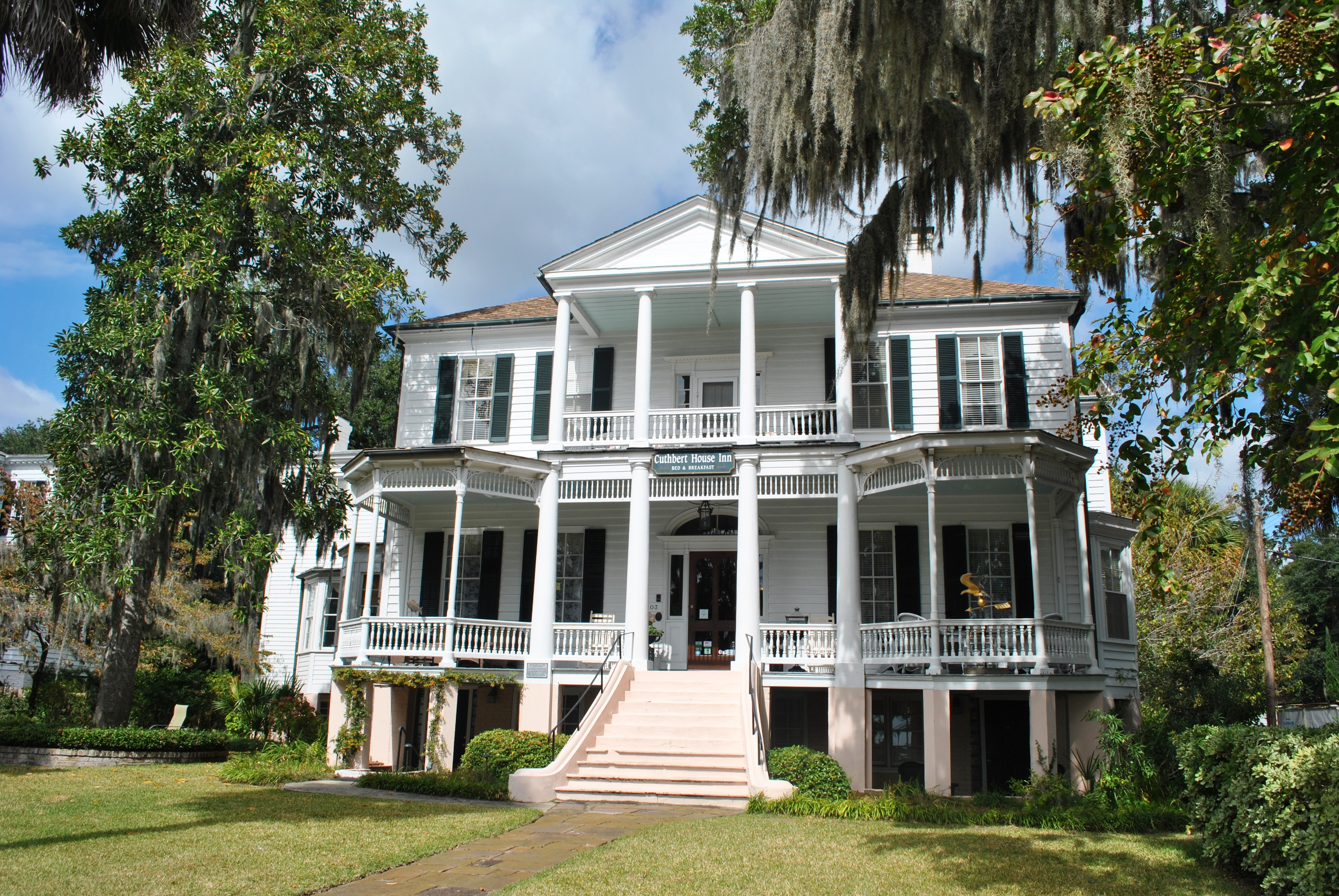
- John Cuthbert House

- Location within South Carolina Location within the United States
- Location: 1203 Bay St., Beaufort, South Carolina
- Coordinates: 32°25′57.2″N 80°40′31.7″W
- Area: 0.5 acres (0.20 ha)
- Built: 1811
- Part of: Beaufort Historic District (ID69000159)
- NRHP reference No.: 72001192

Significant dates
- Added to NRHP: June 13, 1972
- Designated NHLDCP: November 7, 1973

John A. Cuthbert House is a house built in 1811 in Beaufort. It was listed on the National Register of Historic Places in 1972.

It is included in the Beaufort Historic District, which is a National Historic Landmark.
